= Ballot (disambiguation) =

A ballot is a device used to record choices made by voters.

Ballot may also refer to:

- Ballot (automobile), a defunct French automobile manufacturer
- Ballot (horse), an American two-time Champion Thoroughbred racehorse
- Ballots, Mayenne, a commune in northwestern France
