= Athée =

Athée may refer to the following places in France:

- Athée, a commune in the department of Côte-d'Or
- Athée, a commune in the department of Mayenne
- Athée-sur-Cher, a commune in the department of Indre-et-Loire
