= Arrondissement of Château-Gontier =

Coordinates: 47.83°N 0.70°W

Château-Gontier
- Arrondissement
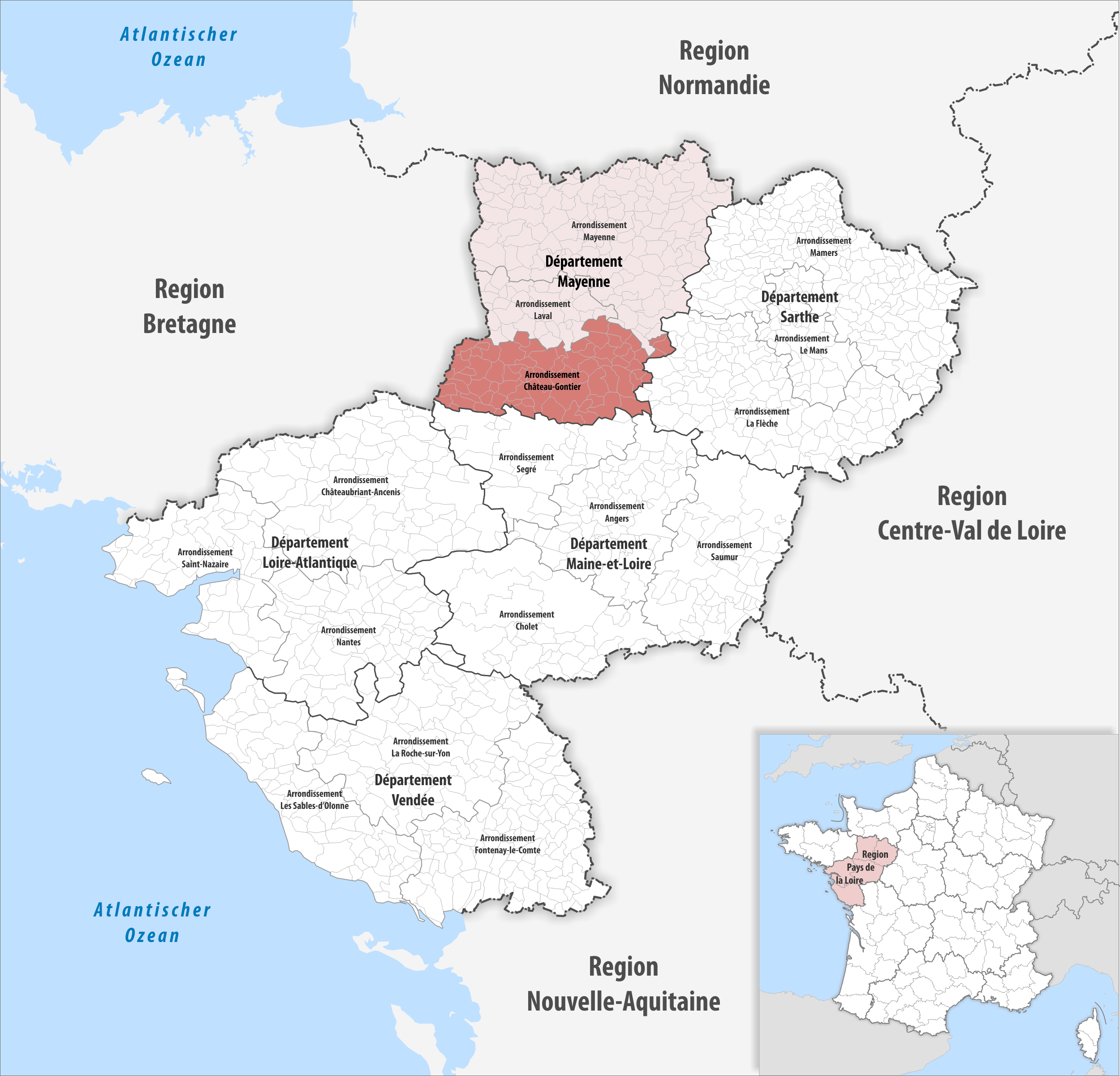
- Location within the region Pays de la Loire
- Country: France
- Region: Pays de la Loire
- Department: Mayenne
- No. of communes: {{{nbcomm}}}
- Area: 1,527.4 km^{2} (589.7 sq mi)
- Population (2023): 73,131
  - Density: 47.879/km^{2} (124.01/sq mi)
- INSEE code: 531

The arrondissement of Château-Gontier is an arrondissement of France in the Mayenne department in the Pays de la Loire region. It has 76 communes. Its population is 73,211 (2021), and its area is 1,527.4 km^{2} (589.7 sq mi).

== Composition ==
The communes of the arrondissement of Château-Gontier, and their INSEE codes, are:

1. Arquenay (53009)
2. Astillé (53011)
3. Athée (53012)
4. Ballots (53018)
5. Bannes (53019)
6. La Bazouge-de-Chemeré (53022)
7. Bazougers (53025)
8. Beaumont-Pied-de-Bœuf (53027)
9. Bierné-les-Villages (53029)
10. Le Bignon-du-Maine (53030)
11. La Boissière (53033)
12. Bouchamps-lès-Craon (53035)
13. Bouère (53036)
14. Bouessay (53037)
15. Brains-sur-les-Marches (53041)
16. Le Buret (53046)
17. La Chapelle-Craonnaise (53058)
18. Château-Gontier-sur-Mayenne (53062)
19. Châtelain (53063)
20. Chemazé (53066)
21. Chémeré-le-Roi (53067)
22. Chérancé (53068)
23. Congrier (53073)
24. Cosmes (53075)
25. Cossé-en-Champagne (53076)
26. Cossé-le-Vivien (53077)
27. Coudray (53078)
28. Courbeveille (53082)
29. Craon (53084)
30. La Cropte (53087)
31. Cuillé (53088)
32. Daon (53089)
33. Denazé (53090)
34. Fontaine-Couverte (53098)
35. Fromentières (53101)
36. Gastines (53102)
37. Gennes-Longuefuye (53104)
38. Grez-en-Bouère (53110)
39. Houssay (53117)
40. Laubrières (53128)
41. Livré-la-Touche (53135)
42. Maisoncelles-du-Maine (53143)
43. Marigné-Peuton (53145)
44. Mée (53148)
45. Ménil (53150)
46. Méral (53151)
47. Meslay-du-Maine (53152)
48. Niafles (53165)
49. Origné (53172)
50. Peuton (53178)
51. Pommerieux (53180)
52. Préaux (53184)
53. Prée-d'Anjou (53124)
54. Quelaines-Saint-Gault (53186)
55. Renazé (53188)
56. La Roche-Neuville (53136)
57. La Roë (53191)
58. La Rouaudière (53192)
59. Ruillé-Froid-Fonds (53193)
60. Saint-Aignan-sur-Roë (53197)
61. Saint-Brice (53203)
62. Saint-Charles-la-Forêt (53206)
63. Saint-Denis-d'Anjou (53210)
64. Saint-Denis-du-Maine (53212)
65. Saint-Erblon (53214)
66. Saint-Loup-du-Dorat (53233)
67. Saint-Martin-du-Limet (53240)
68. Saint-Michel-de-la-Roë (53242)
69. Saint-Poix (53250)
70. Saint-Quentin-les-Anges (53251)
71. Saint-Saturnin-du-Limet (53253)
72. La Selle-Craonnaise (53258)
73. Senonnes (53259)
74. Simplé (53260)
75. Val-du-Maine (53017)
76. Villiers-Charlemagne (53273)

== History ==
The arrondissement of Château-Gontier was created in 1800, disbanded in 1926 and restored in 1942. At the March 2016 reorganisation of the arrondissements of Mayenne, it gained 14 communes from the arrondissement of Laval.

As a result of the reorganisation of the cantons of France which came into effect in 2015, the borders of the cantons are no longer related to the borders of the arrondissements. The cantons of the arrondissement of Château-Gontier were, as of January 2015:

1. Bierné
2. Château-Gontier-Est
3. Château-Gontier-Ouest
4. Cossé-le-Vivien
5. Craon
6. Grez-en-Bouère
7. Saint-Aignan-sur-Roë
