= Boissières =

Boissières is the name or part of the name of several communes in France:

- Boissières, in the Gard
- Boissières, in the Lot

== See also ==
- La Boissière, in the Calvados department
- La Boissière, in the Eure department
- La Boissière, in the Hérault department
- La Boissière, in the Jura department
- La Boissière, in the Mayenne department
- La Boissière-d'Ans, in the Dordogne department
- La Boissière-de-Montaigu, in the Vendée department
- La Boissière-des-Landes, in the Vendée department
- La Boissière-du-Doré, in the Loire-Atlantique department
- La Boissière-École, in the Yvelines department
- La Boissière-en-Gâtine, in the Deux-Sèvres department
- La Boissière-sur-Èvre, in the Maine-et-Loire department
