= Saint-Michel-de-la-Roë =

- Commune
- Location of Saint-Michel-de-la-Roë
- Location within France Location within Pays de la Loire
- Coordinates: 47°52′48″N 1°07′38″W
- Country: France
- Region: Pays de la Loire
- Department: Mayenne
- Arrondissement: Château-Gontier
- Canton: Cossé-le-Vivien
- Intercommunality: CC du Pays de Craon

Government
  - Mayor (2020–2026): Pierrick Gilles
- Area^{1}: 13.22 km^{2} (5.10 sq mi)
- Elevation: 72 m (236 ft)
- Highest elevation: 107 m (351 ft)
- Lowest elevation: 57 m (187 ft)
- Population (2023): 252
  - Density: 19.1/km^{2} (49.4/sq mi)
- Time zone: UTC+01:00 (CET)
  - Summer (DST): UTC+02:00 (CEST)
- INSEE/Postal code: 53242 /53350
- ^{1} French Land Register data, which excludes lakes, ponds, glaciers > 1 km^{2} (0.386 sq mi or 247 acres) and river estuaries.

Saint-Michel-de-la-Roë (French pronunciation: [sɛ̃ miʃɛl də la ʁo], literally Saint-Michel of La Roë) is a commune in the Mayenne department in north-western France.

== See also ==
- Communes of the Mayenne department
