= Saint-Aignan-sur-Roë =

- Commune
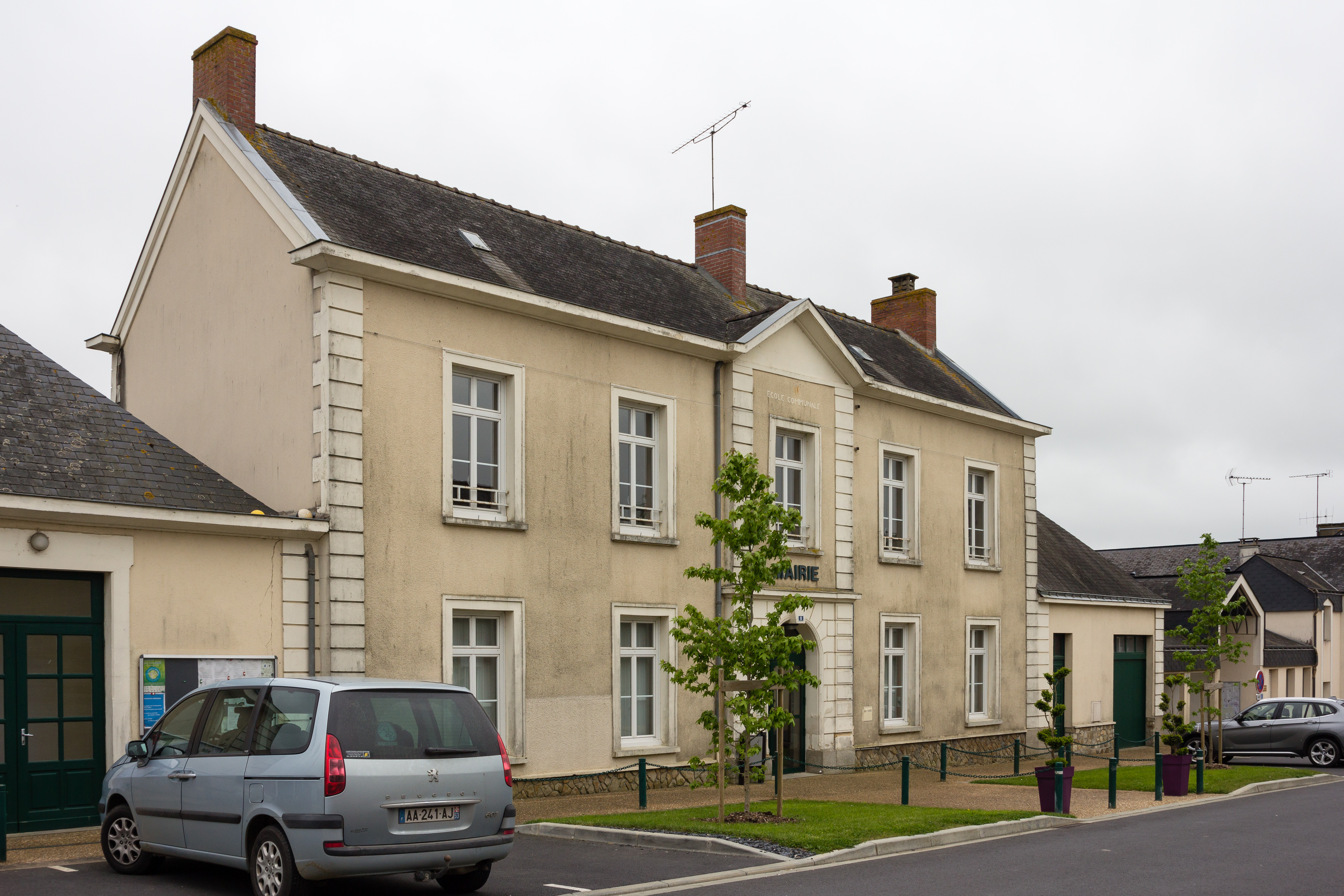
- Saint-Aignan-sur-Roë Town hall

- Coat of arms
- Location of Saint-Aignan-sur-Roë
- Location within France Location within Pays de la Loire
- Coordinates: 47°50′28″N 1°08′10″W
- Country: France
- Region: Pays de la Loire
- Department: Mayenne
- Arrondissement: Château-Gontier
- Canton: Cossé-le-Vivien

Government
  - Mayor (2020–2026): Loïc Pène
- Area^{1}: 18.19 km^{2} (7.02 sq mi)
- Elevation: 124 m (407 ft)
- Highest elevation: 112 m (367 ft)
- Lowest elevation: 69 m (226 ft)
- Population (2023): 949
  - Density: 52.2/km^{2} (135/sq mi)
- Time zone: UTC+01:00 (CET)
  - Summer (DST): UTC+02:00 (CEST)
- INSEE/Postal code: 53197 /53390
- ^{1} French Land Register data, which excludes lakes, ponds, glaciers > 1 km^{2} (0.386 sq mi or 247 acres) and river estuaries.

Saint-Aignan-sur-Roë (French pronunciation: [sɛ̃t‿ɛɲɑ̃ syʁ ʁo], literally Saint-Aignan on Roë) is a commune in the Mayenne department in north-western France.

== See also ==
- Communes of Mayenne
