= Châtelain, Mayenne =

Châtelain
- Commune
- Coat of arms
- Location of Châtelain
- Location within France Location within Pays de la Loire
- Coordinates: 47°48′33″N 0°35′40″W
- Country: France
- Region: Pays de la Loire
- Department: Mayenne
- Arrondissement: Château-Gontier
- Canton: Château-Gontier-sur-Mayenne-1

Government
  - Mayor (2020–2026): Rachel Français
- Area^{1}: 13.91 km^{2} (5.37 sq mi)
- Elevation: 84 m (276 ft)
- Highest elevation: 91 m (299 ft)
- Lowest elevation: 34 m (112 ft)
- Population (2023): 470
  - Density: 34/km^{2} (88/sq mi)
- Time zone: UTC+01:00 (CET)
  - Summer (DST): UTC+02:00 (CEST)
- INSEE/Postal code: 53063 /53200
- ^{1} French Land Register data, which excludes lakes, ponds, glaciers > 1 km^{2} (0.386 sq mi or 247 acres) and river estuaries.

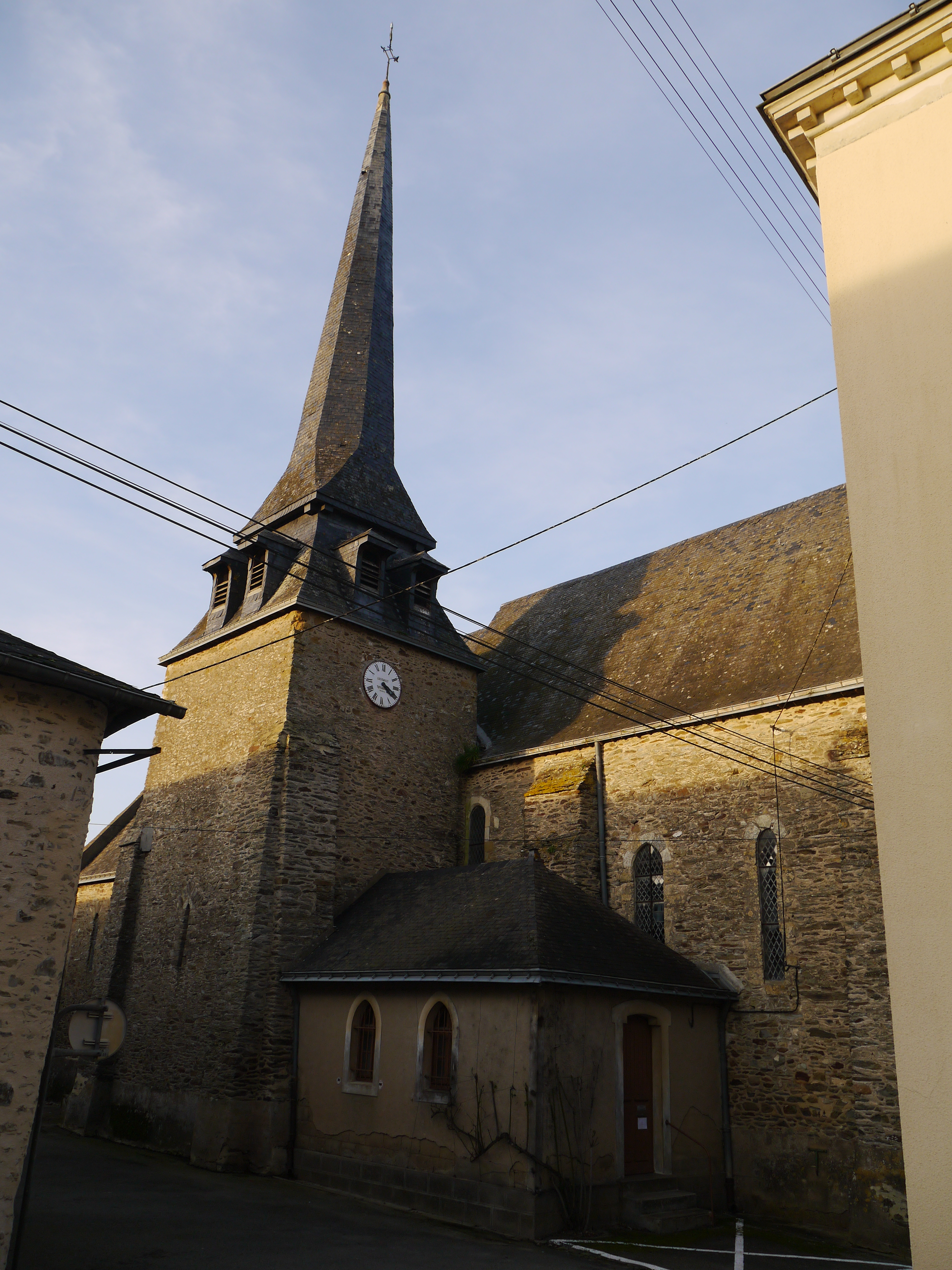
Châtelain

Châtelain (French pronunciation: [ʃatlɛ̃]) is a commune in the Mayenne department in north-western France.

== See also ==
- Communes of the Mayenne department
