= Saint-Martin-du-Limet =

- Commune
- Location of Saint-Martin-du-Limet
- Location within France Location within Pays de la Loire
- Coordinates: 47°48′57″N 1°01′11″W
- Country: France
- Region: Pays de la Loire
- Department: Mayenne
- Arrondissement: Château-Gontier
- Canton: Cossé-le-Vivien
- Intercommunality: CC du Pays de Craon

Government
  - Mayor (2020–2026): Aristide Bourbon
- Area^{1}: 12.36 km^{2} (4.77 sq mi)
- Elevation: 84 m (276 ft)
- Highest elevation: 106 m (348 ft)
- Lowest elevation: 43 m (141 ft)
- Population (2023): 420
  - Density: 34/km^{2} (88/sq mi)
- Time zone: UTC+01:00 (CET)
  - Summer (DST): UTC+02:00 (CEST)
- INSEE/Postal code: 53240 /53800
- ^{1} French Land Register data, which excludes lakes, ponds, glaciers > 1 km^{2} (0.386 sq mi or 247 acres) and river estuaries.

Saint-Martin-du-Limet (French pronunciation: [sɛ̃ maʁtɛ̃ dy limɛ]) is a commune in the Mayenne department in north-western France.

== See also ==
- Communes of the Mayenne department
