= Marigné-Peuton =

- Commune
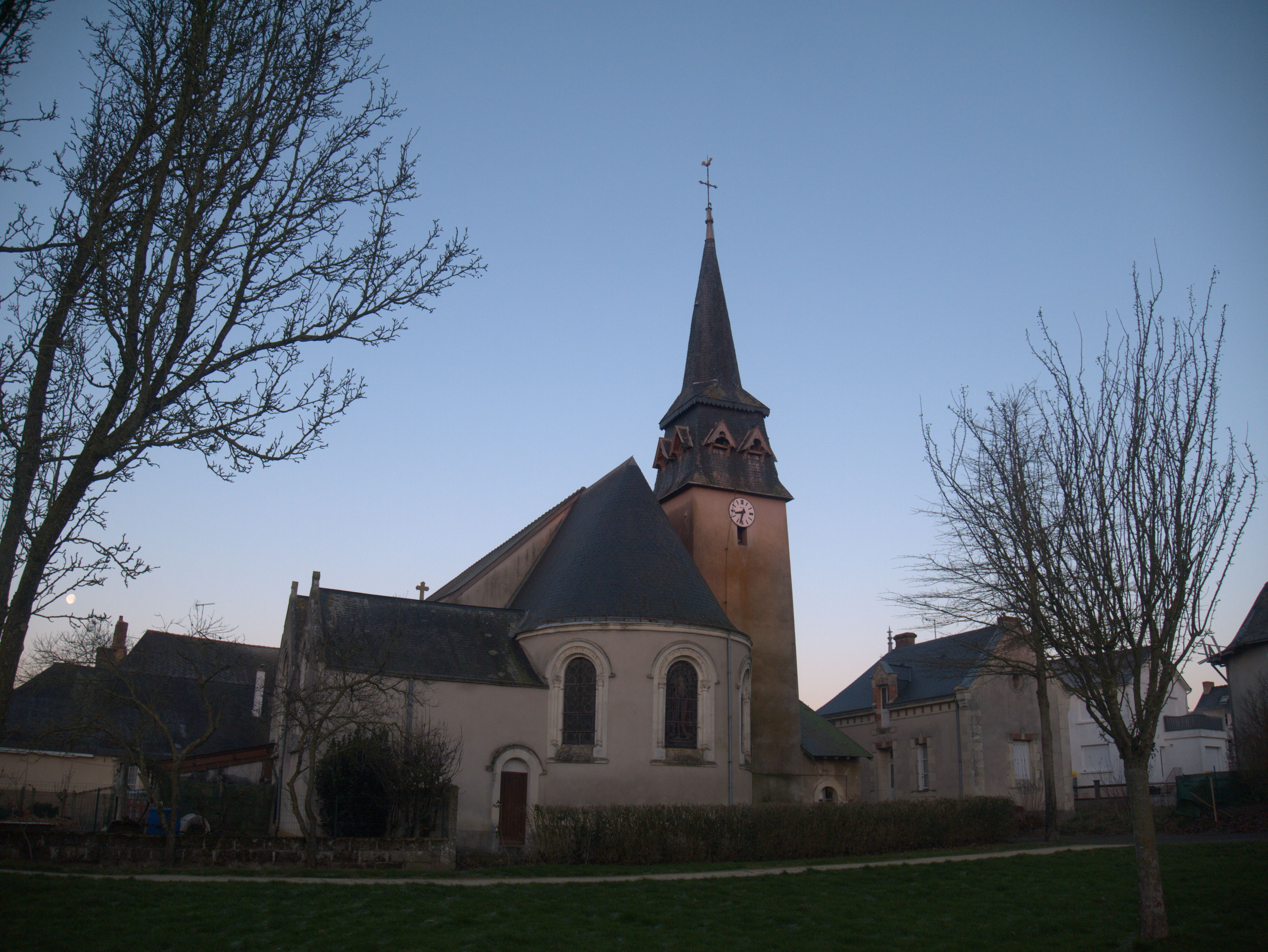
- The church in Marigné-Peuton
- Location of Marigné-Peuton
- Location within France Location within Pays de la Loire
- Coordinates: 47°52′12″N 0°48′42″W
- Country: France
- Region: Pays de la Loire
- Department: Mayenne
- Arrondissement: Château-Gontier
- Canton: Château-Gontier-sur-Mayenne-2

Government
  - Mayor (2020–2026): Jérémy Pele
- Area^{1}: 16.61 km^{2} (6.41 sq mi)
- Elevation: 90 m (300 ft)
- Highest elevation: 101 m (331 ft)
- Lowest elevation: 57 m (187 ft)
- Population (2023): 543
  - Density: 32.7/km^{2} (84.7/sq mi)
- Time zone: UTC+01:00 (CET)
  - Summer (DST): UTC+02:00 (CEST)
- INSEE/Postal code: 53145 /53200
- ^{1} French Land Register data, which excludes lakes, ponds, glaciers > 1 km^{2} (0.386 sq mi or 247 acres) and river estuaries.

Marigné-Peuton (French pronunciation: [maʁiɲe pøtɔ̃]) is a commune in the Mayenne department in north-western France.

== See also ==
- Communes of Mayenne
