= La Chapelle-Craonnaise =

- Commune
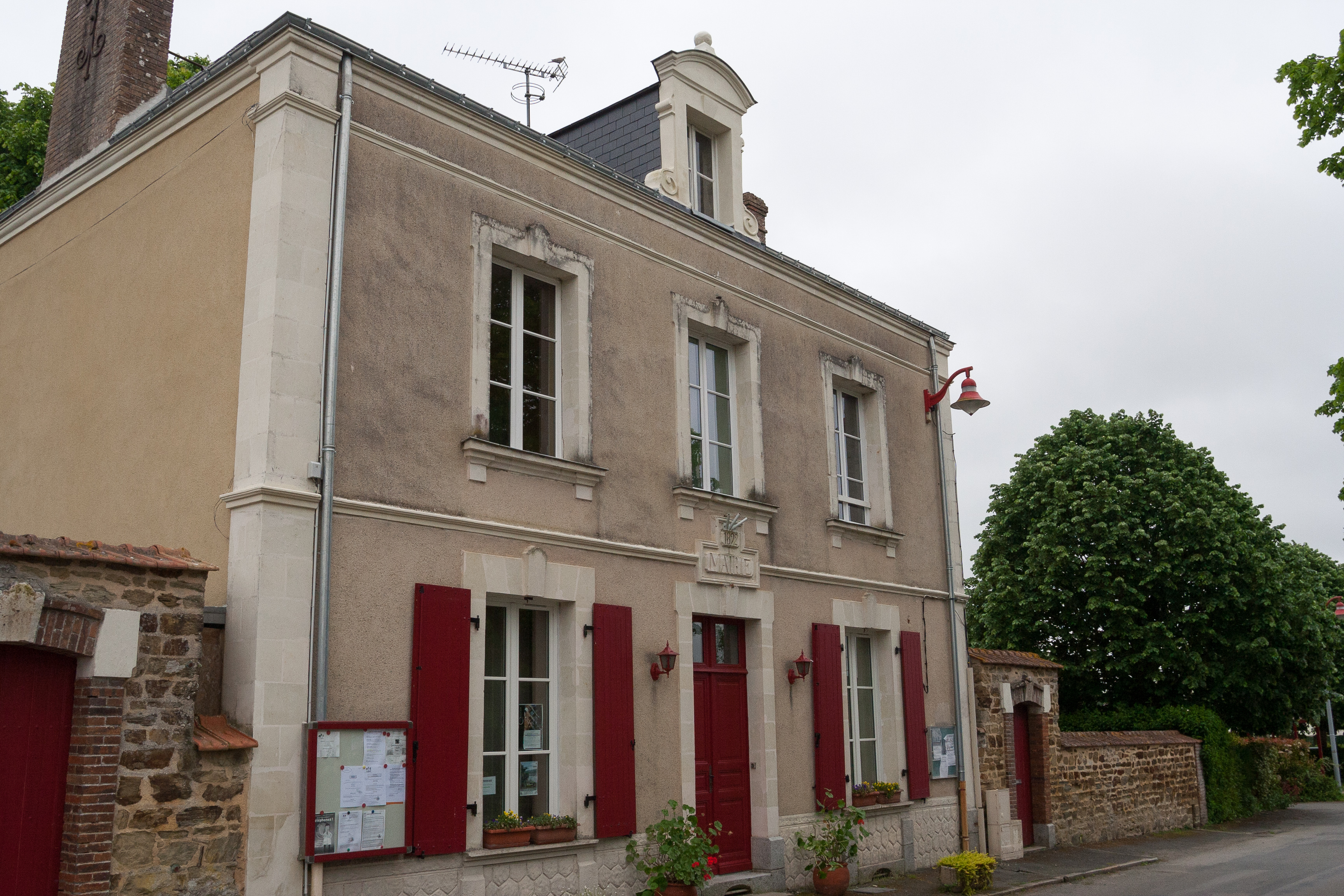
- The town hall.
- Location of La Chapelle-Craonnaise
- Location within France Location within Pays de la Loire
- Coordinates: 47°53′59″N 0°54′52″W
- Country: France
- Region: Pays de la Loire
- Department: Mayenne
- Arrondissement: Château-Gontier
- Canton: Cossé-le-Vivien

Government
  - Mayor (2020–2026): Gérard Lecot
- Area^{1}: 10.32 km^{2} (3.98 sq mi)
- Elevation: 200 m (660 ft)
- Highest elevation: 96 m (315 ft)
- Lowest elevation: 47 m (154 ft)
- Population (2023): 308
  - Density: 29.8/km^{2} (77.3/sq mi)
- Time zone: UTC+01:00 (CET)
  - Summer (DST): UTC+02:00 (CEST)
- INSEE/Postal code: 53058 /53230
- ^{1} French Land Register data, which excludes lakes, ponds, glaciers > 1 km^{2} (0.386 sq mi or 247 acres) and river estuaries.

La Chapelle-Craonnaise (French pronunciation: [la ʃapɛl kʁanɛz]) is a commune in the Mayenne department in north-western France.

== Geography ==
The river Oudon forms most of the commune's north-western border.

== See also ==
- Communes of the Mayenne department
