= Communes of the Mayenne department =

List of French comunes

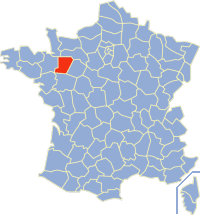

The following is a list of the 240 communes of the Mayenne department of France.

The communes cooperate in the following intercommunalities (as of 2025):

- Communauté d'agglomération Laval Agglomération
- Communauté de communes du Bocage Mayennais
- Communauté de communes des Coëvrons
- Communauté de communes de l'Ernée
- Communauté de communes Mayenne Communauté
- Communauté de communes du Mont des Avaloirs
- Communauté de communes du Pays de Château-Gontier
- Communauté de communes du Pays de Craon
- Communauté de communes du Pays de Meslay-Grez
- Communauté de communes du Pays Sabolien (partly)

INSEE code	Postal code	Commune
53001	53940	Ahuillé
53002	53240	Alexain
53003	53300	Ambrières-les-Vallées
53005	53240	Andouillé
53007	53210	Argentré
53008	53440	Aron
53009	53170	Arquenay
53010	53600	Assé-le-Bérenger
53011	53230	Astillé
53012	53400	Athée
53013	53700	Averton
53015	53240	La Baconnière
53016	53160	Bais
53018	53350	Ballots
53019	53340	Bannes
53021	53440	La Bazoge-Montpinçon
53022	53170	La Bazouge-de-Chemeré
53023	53470	La Bazouge-des-Alleux
53025	53170	Bazougers
53026	53320	Beaulieu-sur-Oudon
53027	53290	Beaumont-Pied-de-Bœuf
53028	53440	Belgeard
53029	53290	Bierné-les-Villages
53030	53170	Le Bignon-du-Maine
53031	53240	La Bigottière
53228	53270	Blandouet-Saint Jean
53033	53800	La Boissière
53034	53960	Bonchamp-lès-Laval
53035	53800	Bouchamps-lès-Craon
53036	53290	Bouère
53037	53290	Bouessay
53038	53370	Boulay-les-Ifs
53039	53410	Le Bourgneuf-la-Forêt
53040	53410	Bourgon
53041	53350	Brains-sur-les-Marches
53042	53120	Brecé
53043	53150	Brée
53045	53410	La Brûlatte
53046	53170	Le Buret
53047	53120	Carelles
53048	53420	Chailland
53049	53470	Châlons-du-Maine
53051	53640	Champéon
53052	53370	Champfrémont
53053	53160	Champgenéteux
53054	53810	Changé
53055	53300	Chantrigné
53056	53950	La Chapelle-Anthenaise
53057	53440	La Chapelle-au-Riboul
53058	53230	La Chapelle-Craonnaise
53059	53150	La Chapelle-Rainsouin
53061	53250	Charchigné
53062	53200	Château-Gontier-sur-Mayenne
53063	53200	Châtelain
53064	53100	Châtillon-sur-Colmont
53066	53200	Chemazé
53067	53340	Chémeré-le-Roi
53068	53400	Chérancé
53069	53250	Chevaigné-du-Maine
53071	53120	Colombiers-du-Plessis
53072	53470	Commer
53073	53800	Congrier
53074	53100	Contest
53075	53230	Cosmes
53076	53340	Cossé-en-Champagne
53077	53230	Cossé-le-Vivien
53078	53200	Coudray
53079	53300	Couesmes-Vaucé
53080	53250	Couptrain
53082	53230	Courbeveille
53083	53700	Courcité
53084	53400	Craon
53085	53700	Crennes-sur-Fraubée
53086	53380	La Croixille
53087	53170	La Cropte
53088	53540	Cuillé
53089	53200	Daon
53090	53400	Denazé
53091	53190	Désertines
53093	53190	La Dorée
53094	53260	Entrammes
53096	53500	Ernée
53097	53600	Évron
53098	53350	Fontaine-Couverte
53099	53260	Forcé
53100	53190	Fougerolles-du-Plessis
53101	53200	Fromentières
53102	53540	Gastines
53103	53940	Le Genest-Saint-Isle
53104	53200	Gennes-Longuefuye
53105	53150	Gesnes
53106	53370	Gesvres
53107	53120	Gorron
53108	53410	La Gravelle
53109	53440	Grazay
53110	53290	Grez-en-Bouère
53111	53300	La Haie-Traversaine
53112	53250	Le Ham
53113	53160	Hambers
53114	53640	Hardanges
53115	53120	Hercé
53116	53640	Le Horps
53117	53360	Houssay
53118	53110	Le Housseau-Brétignolles
53119	53970	L'Huisserie
53120	53160	Izé
53121	53250	Javron-les-Chapelles
53122	53160	Jublains
53123	53380	Juvigné
53125	53190	Landivy
53126	53220	Larchamp
53127	53110	Lassay-les-Châteaux
53128	53540	Laubrières
53129	53410	Launay-Villiers
53130	53000	Laval
53131	53120	Lesbois
53132	53120	Levaré
53133	53140	Lignières-Orgères
53134	53150	Livet
53135	53400	Livré-la-Touche
53137	53320	Loiron-Ruillé

INSEE code	Postal code	Commune
53139	53700	Loupfougères
53140	53950	Louverné
53141	53210	Louvigné
53142	53250	Madré
53143	53170	Maisoncelles-du-Maine
53144	53440	Marcillé-la-Ville
53145	53200	Marigné-Peuton
53146	53470	Martigné-sur-Mayenne
53147	53100	Mayenne
53148	53400	Mée
53150	53200	Ménil
53151	53230	Méral
53152	53170	Meslay-du-Maine
53153	53600	Mézangers
53154	53220	Montaudin
53155	53500	Montenay
53156	53240	Montflours
53157	53970	Montigné-le-Brillant
53158	53320	Montjean
53160	53640	Montreuil-Poulay
53161	53150	Montsûrs
53162	53100	Moulay
53163	53150	Neau
53164	53250	Neuilly-le-Vendin
53165	53400	Niafles
53168	53970	Nuillé-sur-Vicoin
53170	53300	Oisseau
53169	53410	Olivet
53172	53360	Origné
53173	53140	La Pallu
53174	53100	Parigné-sur-Braye
53175	53260	Parné-sur-Roc
53176	53300	Le Pas
53177	53220	La Pellerine
53178	53360	Peuton
53179	53240	Placé
53180	53400	Pommerieux
53181	53220	Pontmain
53182	53410	Port-Brillet
53184	53340	Préaux
53124	53200	Prée-d'Anjou
53185	53140	Pré-en-Pail-Saint-Samson
53186	53360	Quelaines-Saint-Gault
53187	61420	Ravigny
53188	53800	Renazé
53189	53110	Rennes-en-Grenouilles
53190	53640	Le Ribay
53136	53200	La Roche-Neuville
53191	53350	La Roë
53192	53390	La Rouaudière
53193	53170	Ruillé-Froid-Fonds
53195	53470	Sacé
53196	53250	Saint-Aignan-de-Couptrain
53197	53390	Saint-Aignan-sur-Roë
53198	53700	Saint-Aubin-du-Désert
53199	53120	Saint-Aubin-Fosse-Louvain
53200	53100	Saint-Baudelle
53201	53940	Saint-Berthevin
53202	53220	Saint-Berthevin-la-Tannière
53203	53290	Saint-Brice
53204	53140	Saint-Calais-du-Désert
53206	53170	Saint-Charles-la-Forêt
53208	53140	Saint-Cyr-en-Pail
53209	53320	Saint-Cyr-le-Gravelais
53210	53290	Saint-Denis-d'Anjou
53211	53500	Saint-Denis-de-Gastines
53212	53170	Saint-Denis-du-Maine
53218	53600	Sainte-Gemmes-le-Robert
53213	53220	Saint-Ellier-du-Maine
53235	53110	Sainte-Marie-du-Bois
53214	53390	Saint-Erblon
53255	53270	Sainte-Suzanne-et-Chammes
53216	53300	Saint-Fraimbault-de-Prières
53219	53100	Saint-Georges-Buttavent
53220	53480	Saint-Georges-le-Fléchard
53221	53600	Saint-Georges-sur-Erve
53222	53240	Saint-Germain-d'Anxure
53223	53700	Saint-Germain-de-Coulamer
53224	53240	Saint-Germain-le-Fouilloux
53225	53240	Saint-Germain-le-Guillaume
53226	53380	Saint-Hilaire-du-Maine
53229	53240	Saint-Jean-sur-Mayenne
53230	53110	Saint-Julien-du-Terroux
53232	53480	Saint-Léger
53233	53290	Saint-Loup-du-Dorat
53234	53300	Saint-Loup-du-Gast
53236	53700	Saint-Mars-du-Désert
53237	53300	Saint-Mars-sur-Colmont
53238	53220	Saint-Mars-sur-la-Futaie
53240	53800	Saint-Martin-du-Limet
53242	53350	Saint-Michel-de-la-Roë
53243	53410	Saint-Ouën-des-Toits
53245	53500	Saint-Pierre-des-Landes
53246	53370	Saint-Pierre-des-Nids
53247	53410	Saint-Pierre-la-Cour
53248	53270	Saint-Pierre-sur-Erve
53250	53540	Saint-Poix
53251	53400	Saint-Quentin-les-Anges
53253	53800	Saint-Saturnin-du-Limet
53256	53160	Saint-Thomas-de-Courceriers
53257	53340	Saulges
53258	53800	La Selle-Craonnaise
53259	53390	Senonnes
53260	53360	Simplé
53261	53300	Soucé
53262	53210	Soulgé-sur-Ouette
53264	53270	Thorigné-en-Charnie
53263	53110	Thubœuf
53265	53270	Torcé-Viviers-en-Charnie
53266	53160	Trans
53267	53480	Vaiges
53017	53340	Val-du-Maine
53269	53500	Vautorte
53270	53120	Vieuvy
53271	53700	Villaines-la-Juhel
53272	53250	Villepail
53273	53170	Villiers-Charlemagne
53239	53160	Vimartin-sur-Orthe
53276	53600	Voutré
