= Peuton =

- Commune
- Location of Peuton
- Location within France Location within Pays de la Loire
- Coordinates: 47°53′09″N 0°49′15″W
- Country: France
- Region: Pays de la Loire
- Department: Mayenne
- Arrondissement: Château-Gontier
- Canton: Château-Gontier-sur-Mayenne-2

Government
  - Mayor (2020–2026): Serge Pointeau
- Area^{1}: 10.58 km^{2} (4.08 sq mi)
- Elevation: 85 m (279 ft)
- Highest elevation: 103 m (338 ft)
- Lowest elevation: 57 m (187 ft)
- Population (2023): 222
  - Density: 21.0/km^{2} (54.3/sq mi)
- Time zone: UTC+01:00 (CET)
  - Summer (DST): UTC+02:00 (CEST)
- INSEE/Postal code: 53178 /53360
- ^{1} French Land Register data, which excludes lakes, ponds, glaciers > 1 km^{2} (0.386 sq mi or 247 acres) and river estuaries.

Peuton (French pronunciation: [pøtɔ̃]) is a commune in the Mayenne department in north-western France.

== See also ==
- Communes of Mayenne
