= Saint-Charles-la-Forêt =

- Commune
- Coat of arms
- Location of Saint-Charles-la-Forêt
- Location within France Location within Pays de la Loire
- Coordinates: 47°55′01″N 0°33′16″W
- Country: France
- Region: Pays de la Loire
- Department: Mayenne
- Arrondissement: Château-Gontier
- Canton: Meslay-du-Maine

Government
  - Mayor (2025–2026): Marie-Pierre Colin
- Area^{1}: 10.61 km^{2} (4.10 sq mi)
- Elevation: 107 m (351 ft)
- Highest elevation: 121 m (397 ft)
- Lowest elevation: 89 m (292 ft)
- Population (2023): 231
  - Density: 21.8/km^{2} (56.4/sq mi)
- Time zone: UTC+01:00 (CET)
  - Summer (DST): UTC+02:00 (CEST)
- INSEE/Postal code: 53206 /53170
- ^{1} French Land Register data, which excludes lakes, ponds, glaciers > 1 km^{2} (0.386 sq mi or 247 acres) and river estuaries.

Saint-Charles-la-Forêt (French pronunciation: [sɛ̃ ʃaʁl la fɔʁɛ]) is a commune in the Mayenne department in north-western France.

== See also ==
- Communes of Mayenne
