= Laubrières =

- Commune
- Coat of arms
- Location of Laubrières
- Location within France Location within Pays de la Loire
- Coordinates: 47°56′33″N 1°04′59″W
- Country: France
- Region: Pays de la Loire
- Department: Mayenne
- Arrondissement: Château-Gontier
- Canton: Cossé-le-Vivien

Government
  - Mayor (2020–2026): Colette Bréhin
- Area^{1}: 8.31 km^{2} (3.21 sq mi)
- Elevation: 85 m (279 ft)
- Highest elevation: 96 m (315 ft)
- Lowest elevation: 59 m (194 ft)
- Population (2023): 324
  - Density: 39.0/km^{2} (101/sq mi)
- Time zone: UTC+01:00 (CET)
  - Summer (DST): UTC+02:00 (CEST)
- INSEE/Postal code: 53128 /53540
- ^{1} French Land Register data, which excludes lakes, ponds, glaciers > 1 km^{2} (0.386 sq mi or 247 acres) and river estuaries.

Laubrières (French pronunciation: [lobʁijɛʁ]) is a commune in the Mayenne department in north-western France.

== See also ==
- Communes of the Mayenne department
