= Niafles =

- Commune
- Location of Niafles
- Location within France Location within Pays de la Loire
- Coordinates: 47°50′50″N 1°00′02″W
- Country: France
- Region: Pays de la Loire
- Department: Mayenne
- Arrondissement: Château-Gontier
- Canton: Château-Gontier-sur-Mayenne-2

Government
  - Mayor (2020–2026): Daniel Gendry
- Area^{1}: 8 km^{2} (3.1 sq mi)
- Highest elevation: 89 m (292 ft)
- Lowest elevation: 37 m (121 ft)
- Population (2023): 344
  - Density: 43/km^{2} (110/sq mi)
- Time zone: UTC+01:00 (CET)
  - Summer (DST): UTC+02:00 (CEST)
- INSEE/Postal code: 53165 /53400
- ^{1} French Land Register data, which excludes lakes, ponds, glaciers > 1 km^{2} (0.386 sq mi or 247 acres) and river estuaries.

Niafles (French pronunciation: [njafl]) is a commune in the Mayenne department in north-western France.

== See also ==
- Communes of Mayenne
