= Bouessay =

- Commune
- Location of Bouessay
- Location within France Location within Pays de la Loire
- Coordinates: 47°52′37″N 0°23′30″W
- Country: France
- Region: Pays de la Loire
- Department: Mayenne
- Arrondissement: Château-Gontier
- Canton: Meslay-du-Maine
- Intercommunality: CC Pays Sabolien

Government
  - Mayor (2020–2026): Pierre Paterne
- Area^{1}: 9.34 km^{2} (3.61 sq mi)
- Elevation: 67 m (220 ft)
- Highest elevation: 70 m (230 ft)
- Lowest elevation: 27 m (89 ft)
- Population (2023): 714
  - Density: 76.4/km^{2} (198/sq mi)
- Time zone: UTC+01:00 (CET)
  - Summer (DST): UTC+02:00 (CEST)
- INSEE/Postal code: 53037 /53290
- ^{1} French Land Register data, which excludes lakes, ponds, glaciers > 1 km^{2} (0.386 sq mi or 247 acres) and river estuaries.

Bouessay (French pronunciation: [bwesɛ]) is a commune in the Mayenne department in northwestern France.

== Geography ==
The Vaige forms part of the commune's northwestern border, flows southeast through the middle of the commune, then forms most part of the commune's southeastern border.

== Population ==
Historical population
Year	Pop.	±% p.a.
1968	324	—
1975	324	+0.00%
1982	540	+7.57%
1990	568	+0.63%
1999	563	−0.10%
2007	770	+3.99%
2012	774	+0.10%
2017	736	−1.00%
2023	714	−0.50%
Source: INSEE

== See also ==
- Communes of Mayenne
