= Brains-sur-les-Marches =

- Commune
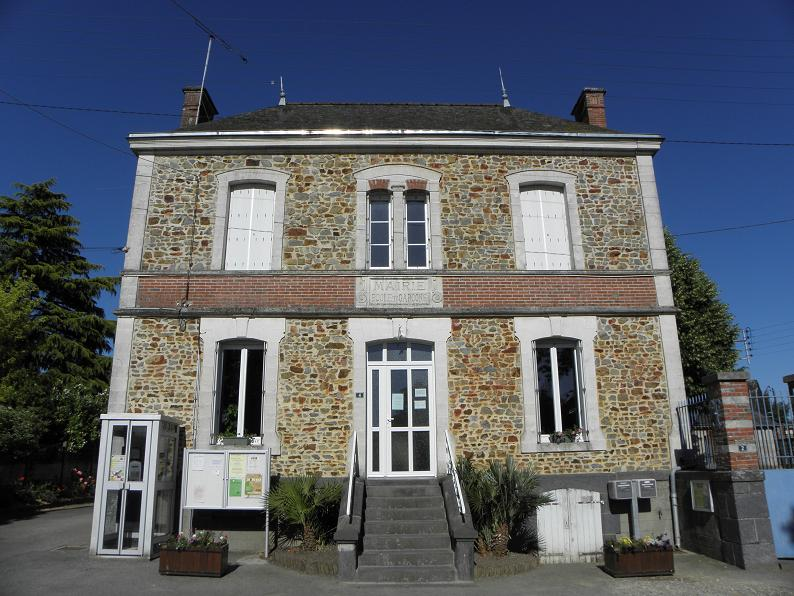
- The town hall in Brains-sur-les-Marches
- Location of Brains-sur-les-Marches
- Location within France Location within Pays de la Loire
- Coordinates: 47°53′14″N 1°10′49″W
- Country: France
- Region: Pays de la Loire
- Department: Mayenne
- Arrondissement: Château-Gontier
- Canton: Cossé-le-Vivien

Government
  - Mayor (2020–2026): Vanessa Sorieux
- Area^{1}: 7.68 km^{2} (2.97 sq mi)
- Highest elevation: 109 m (358 ft)
- Lowest elevation: 72 m (236 ft)
- Population (2023): 279
  - Density: 36.3/km^{2} (94.1/sq mi)
- Time zone: UTC+01:00 (CET)
  - Summer (DST): UTC+02:00 (CEST)
- INSEE/Postal code: 53041 /53350
- ^{1} French Land Register data, which excludes lakes, ponds, glaciers > 1 km^{2} (0.386 sq mi or 247 acres) and river estuaries.

Brains-sur-les-Marches (French pronunciation: [bʁɛ̃ syʁ le maʁʃ]) is a commune in the Mayenne department in northwestern France.

== Population ==
Historical population
Year	Pop.	±% p.a.
1968	353	—
1975	293	−2.63%
1982	220	−4.01%
1990	224	+0.23%
1999	229	+0.25%
2007	233	+0.22%
2012	237	+0.34%
2017	269	+2.57%
2023	279	+0.61%
Source: INSEE

== See also ==
- Communes of Mayenne
