= Renazé =

- Commune
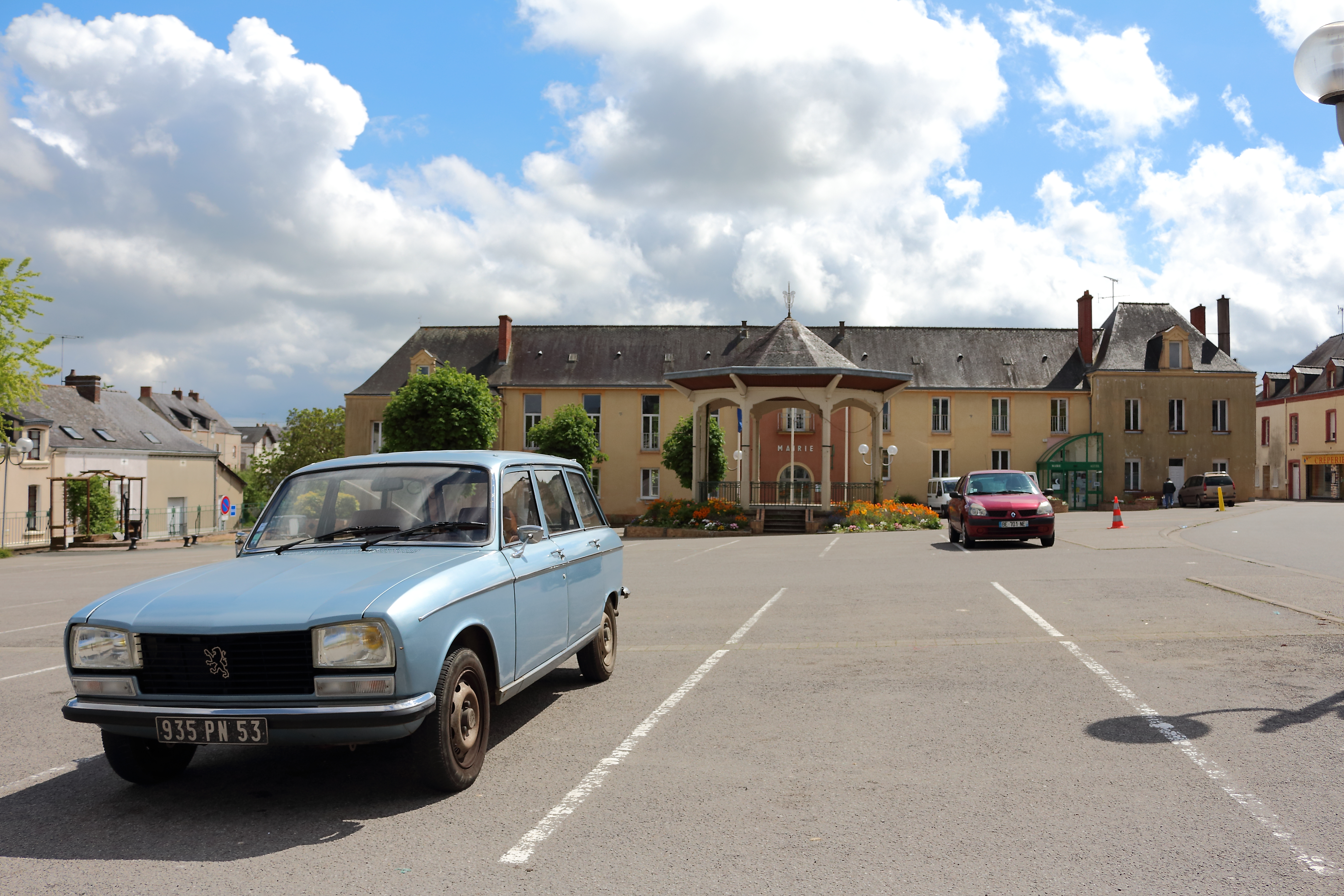
- Town hall

- Coat of arms
- Location of Renazé
- Location within France Location within Pays de la Loire
- Coordinates: 47°47′39″N 1°03′25″W
- Country: France
- Region: Pays de la Loire
- Department: Mayenne
- Arrondissement: Château-Gontier
- Canton: Cossé-le-Vivien

Government
  - Mayor (2020–2026): Patrick Gaultier
- Area^{1}: 16.72 km^{2} (6.46 sq mi)
- Elevation: 80 m (260 ft)
- Highest elevation: 108 m (354 ft)
- Lowest elevation: 20 m (66 ft)
- Population (2023): 2,504
  - Density: 149.8/km^{2} (387.9/sq mi)
- Time zone: UTC+01:00 (CET)
  - Summer (DST): UTC+02:00 (CEST)
- INSEE/Postal code: 53188 /53800
- ^{1} French Land Register data, which excludes lakes, ponds, glaciers > 1 km^{2} (0.386 sq mi or 247 acres) and river estuaries.

Renazé (French pronunciation: [ʁənaze]) is a commune in the Mayenne department in north-western France.

== Population ==
Historical population
Year	Pop.	±% p.a.
1968	3,007	—
1975	2,913	−0.45%
1982	2,881	−0.16%
1990	2,860	−0.09%
1999	2,791	−0.27%
2007	2,731	−0.27%
2012	2,683	−0.35%
2017	2,541	−1.08%
2023	2,504	−0.24%
Source: INSEE

== See also ==
- Communes of Mayenne
