= Saint-Poix =

- Commune
- Location of Saint-Poix
- Location within France Location within Pays de la Loire
- Coordinates: 47°57′58″N 1°02′32″W
- Country: France
- Region: Pays de la Loire
- Department: Mayenne
- Arrondissement: Château-Gontier
- Canton: Cossé-le-Vivien
- Intercommunality: CC du Pays de Craon

Government
  - Mayor (2020–2026): Clément Beucher
- Area^{1}: 7.38 km^{2} (2.85 sq mi)
- Elevation: 80 m (260 ft)
- Highest elevation: 102 m (335 ft)
- Lowest elevation: 72 m (236 ft)
- Population (2023): 383
  - Density: 51.9/km^{2} (134/sq mi)
- Time zone: UTC+01:00 (CET)
  - Summer (DST): UTC+02:00 (CEST)
- INSEE/Postal code: 53250 /53540
- ^{1} French Land Register data, which excludes lakes, ponds, glaciers > 1 km^{2} (0.386 sq mi or 247 acres) and river estuaries.

Saint-Poix (French pronunciation: [sɛ̃ pwa]) is a commune in the Mayenne department in north-western France.

== See also ==
- Communes of the Mayenne department
