= Cossé-le-Vivien =

- Commune
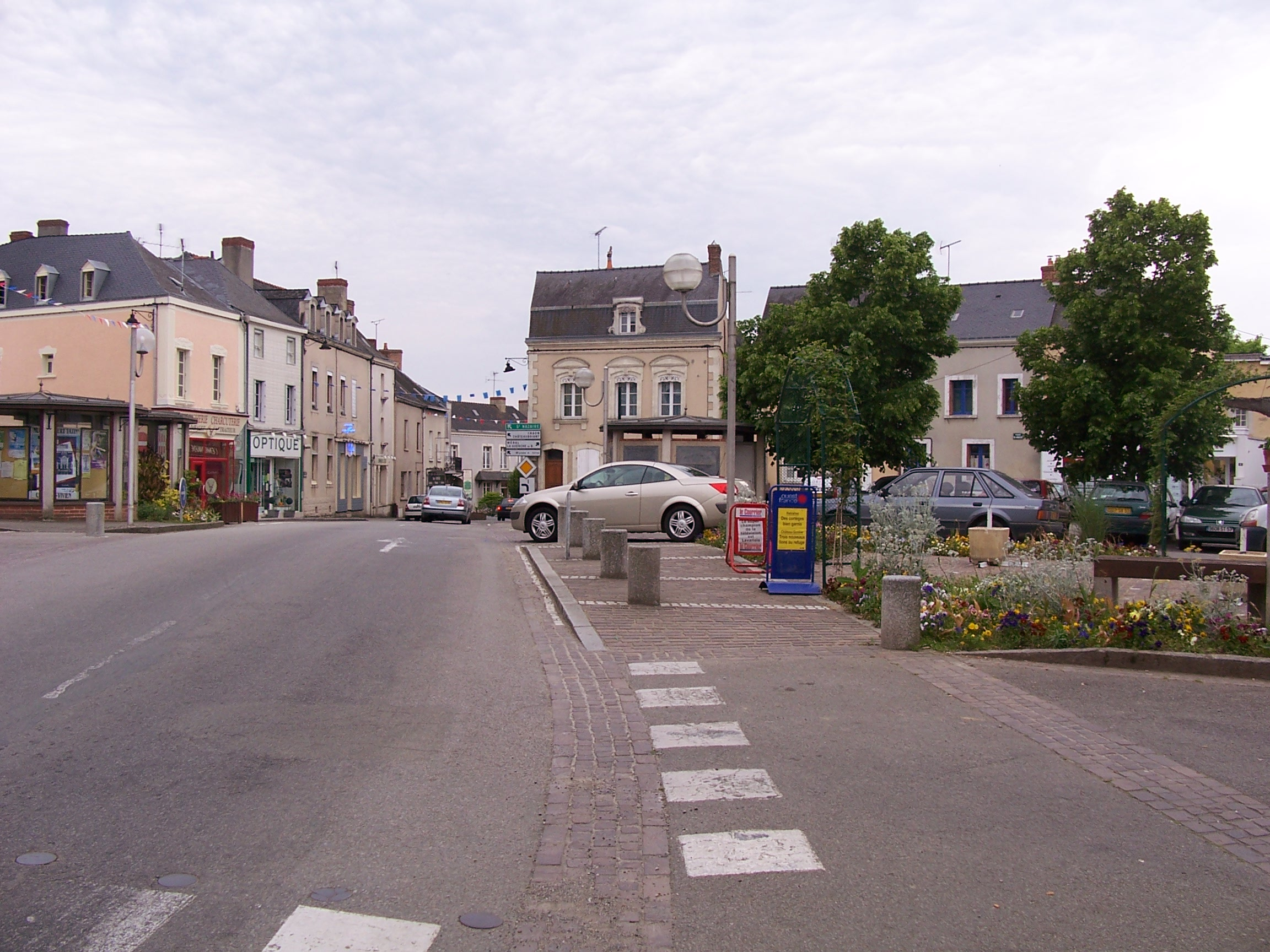
- The centre of Cossé-le-Vivien

- Coat of arms
- Location of Cossé-le-Vivien
- Location within France Location within Pays de la Loire
- Coordinates: 47°56′46″N 0°54′37″W
- Country: France
- Region: Pays de la Loire
- Department: Mayenne
- Arrondissement: Château-Gontier
- Canton: Cossé-le-Vivien

Government
  - Mayor (2020–2026): Christophe Langouet
- Area^{1}: 44.41 km^{2} (17.15 sq mi)
- Elevation: 81 m (266 ft)
- Highest elevation: 104 m (341 ft)
- Lowest elevation: 50 m (160 ft)
- Population (2023): 3,174
  - Density: 71.47/km^{2} (185.1/sq mi)
- Time zone: UTC+01:00 (CET)
  - Summer (DST): UTC+02:00 (CEST)
- INSEE/Postal code: 53077 /53230
- ^{1} French Land Register data, which excludes lakes, ponds, glaciers > 1 km^{2} (0.386 sq mi or 247 acres) and river estuaries.

Cossé-le-Vivien (French pronunciation: [kɔse lə vivjɛ̃]) is a commune in the Mayenne department in north-western France.

== Geography ==
The river Oudon flows through the middle of the commune and forms most of its north-western border. It contains a museum dedicated to Robert Tatin's work.

== Population ==
Historical population
Year	Pop.	±% p.a.
1968	2,443	—
1975	2,626	+1.04%
1982	2,780	+0.82%
1990	2,806	+0.12%
1999	2,706	−0.40%
2007	2,890	+0.83%
2012	2,987	+0.66%
2017	3,134	+0.97%
2023	3,174	+0.21%
Source: INSEE

== See also ==
- Communes of the Mayenne department

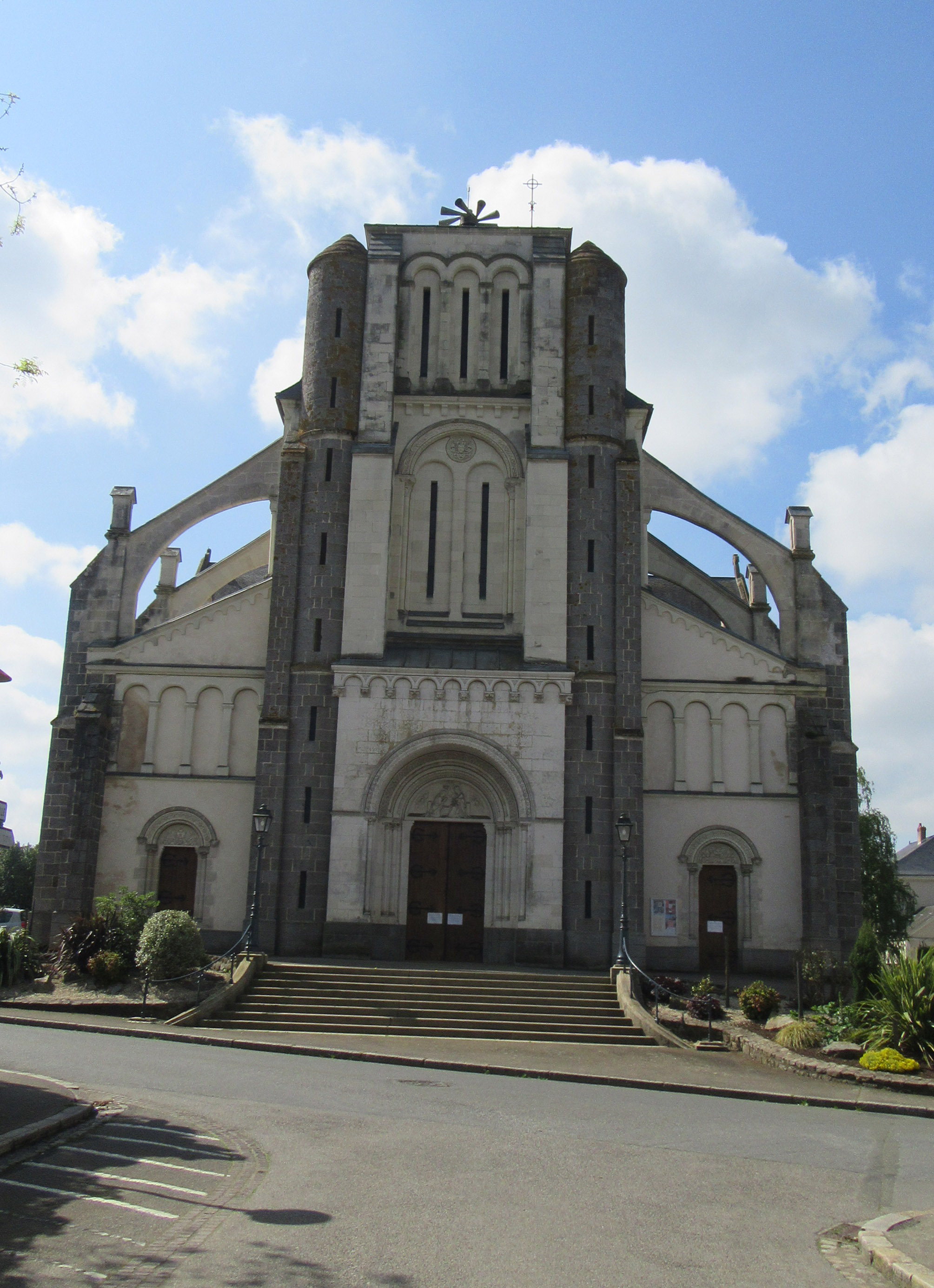
Parish church.
