= Quelaines-Saint-Gault =

- Commune
- Coat of arms
- Location of Quelaines-Saint-Gault
- Location within France Location within Pays de la Loire
- Coordinates: 47°55′31″N 0°48′04″W
- Country: France
- Region: Pays de la Loire
- Department: Mayenne
- Arrondissement: Château-Gontier
- Canton: Cossé-le-Vivien
- Intercommunality: Pays de Craon

Government
  - Mayor (2020–2026): Laurent Lefèvre
- Area^{1}: 42.25 km^{2} (16.31 sq mi)
- Elevation: 93 m (305 ft)
- Highest elevation: 108 m (354 ft)
- Lowest elevation: 40 m (130 ft)
- Population (2023): 2,152
  - Density: 50.93/km^{2} (131.9/sq mi)
- Time zone: UTC+01:00 (CET)
  - Summer (DST): UTC+02:00 (CEST)
- INSEE/Postal code: 53186 /53360
- ^{1} French Land Register data, which excludes lakes, ponds, glaciers > 1 km^{2} (0.386 sq mi or 247 acres) and river estuaries.

Quelaines-Saint-Gault (French pronunciation: [kəlɛn sɛ̃ ɡo]) is a commune in the Mayenne department in north-western France.

== Population ==
Historical population
Year	Pop.	±% p.a.
1968	1,594	—
1975	1,555	−0.35%
1982	1,727	+1.51%
1990	1,691	−0.26%
1999	1,739	+0.31%
2007	1,861	+0.85%
2012	2,069	+2.14%
2017	2,157	+0.84%
2023	2,152	−0.04%
Source: INSEE

== See also ==
- Communes of Mayenne
