= La Rouaudière =

- Commune
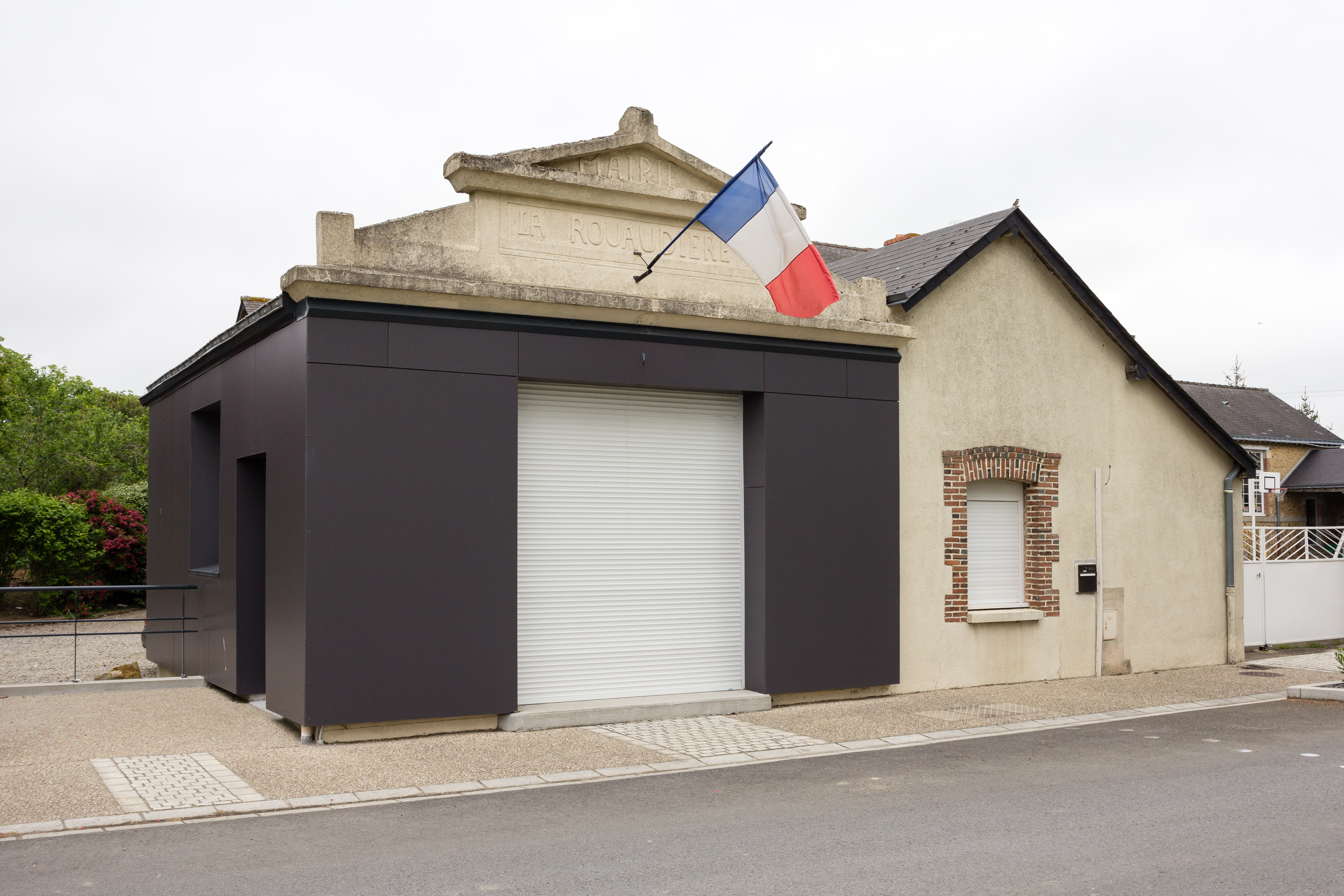
- Town hall

- Coat of arms
- Location of La Rouaudière
- Location within France Location within Pays de la Loire
- Coordinates: 47°49′51″N 1°11′26″W
- Country: France
- Region: Pays de la Loire
- Department: Mayenne
- Arrondissement: Château-Gontier
- Canton: Cossé-le-Vivien

Government
  - Mayor (2020–2026): Thierry Juliot
- Area^{1}: 19.02 km^{2} (7.34 sq mi)
- Elevation: 96 m (315 ft)
- Highest elevation: 112 m (367 ft)
- Lowest elevation: 74 m (243 ft)
- Population (2023): 320
  - Density: 17/km^{2} (44/sq mi)
- Time zone: UTC+01:00 (CET)
  - Summer (DST): UTC+02:00 (CEST)
- INSEE/Postal code: 53192 /53390
- ^{1} French Land Register data, which excludes lakes, ponds, glaciers > 1 km^{2} (0.386 sq mi or 247 acres) and river estuaries.

La Rouaudière (French pronunciation: [la ʁwodjɛʁ]) is a commune in the Mayenne department in north-western France.

== See also ==
- Communes of Mayenne
