= Gastines =

- Commune
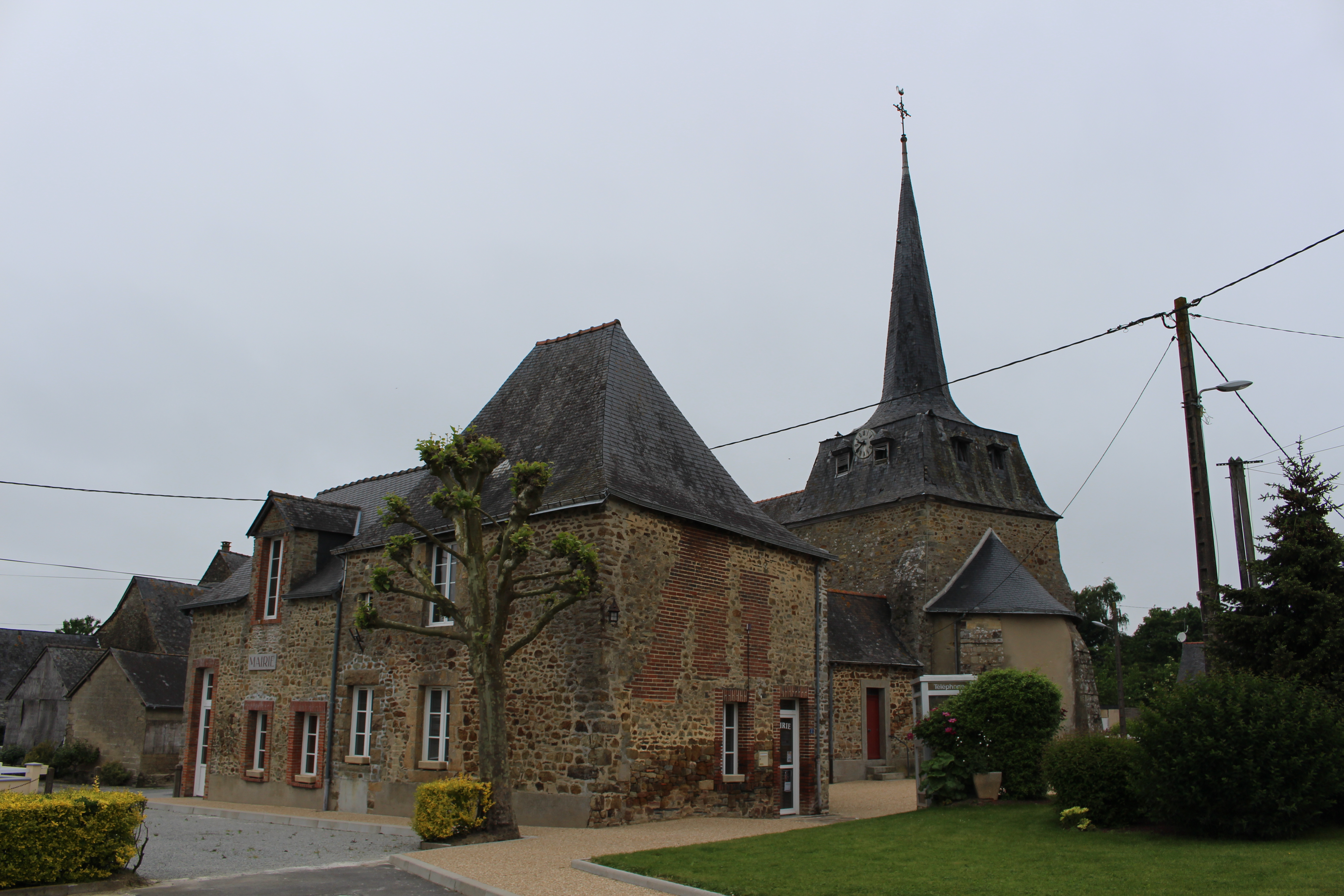
- Town hall
- Location of Gastines
- Location within France Location within Pays de la Loire
- Coordinates: 47°57′09″N 1°06′09″W
- Country: France
- Region: Pays de la Loire
- Department: Mayenne
- Arrondissement: Château-Gontier
- Canton: Cossé-le-Vivien

Government
  - Mayor (2020–2026): Christian Berson
- Area^{1}: 8.85 km^{2} (3.42 sq mi)
- Elevation: 68 m (223 ft)
- Highest elevation: 93 m (305 ft)
- Lowest elevation: 65 m (213 ft)
- Population (2023): 165
  - Density: 18.6/km^{2} (48.3/sq mi)
- Time zone: UTC+01:00 (CET)
  - Summer (DST): UTC+02:00 (CEST)
- INSEE/Postal code: 53102 /53540
- ^{1} French Land Register data, which excludes lakes, ponds, glaciers > 1 km^{2} (0.386 sq mi or 247 acres) and river estuaries.

Gastines (French pronunciation: [ɡastin]) is a commune in the Mayenne department in north-western France.

== See also ==
- Communes of the Mayenne department
