= Saint-Saturnin-du-Limet =

- Commune
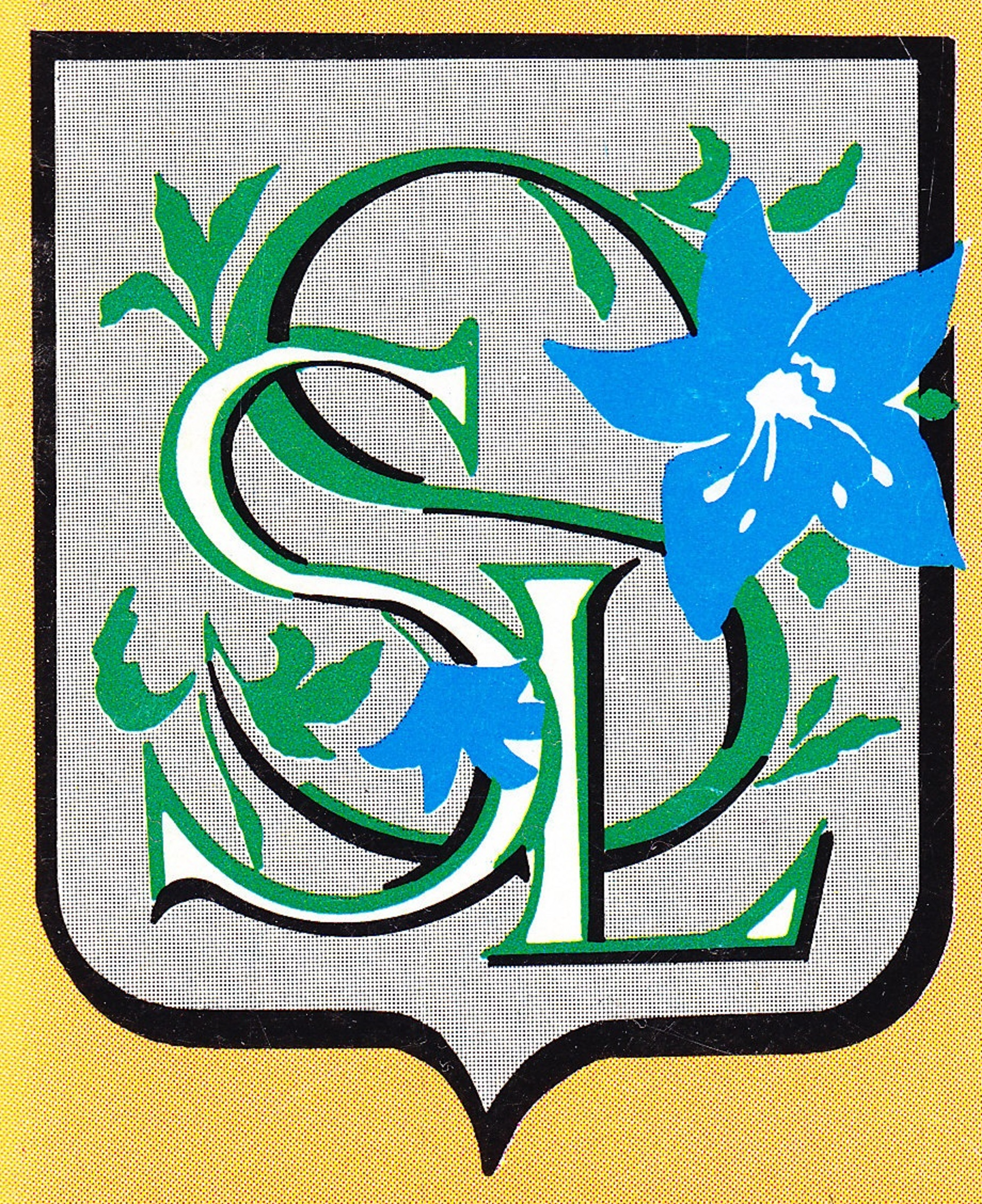
- Coat of arms
- Location of Saint-Saturnin-du-Limet
- Location within France Location within Pays de la Loire
- Coordinates: 47°48′46″N 1°04′01″W
- Country: France
- Region: Pays de la Loire
- Department: Mayenne
- Arrondissement: Château-Gontier
- Canton: Cossé-le-Vivien

Government
  - Mayor (2020–2026): Gérard Bedouet
- Area^{1}: 10.7 km^{2} (4.1 sq mi)
- Elevation: 95 m (312 ft)
- Highest elevation: 107 m (351 ft)
- Lowest elevation: 52 m (171 ft)
- Population (2023): 515
  - Density: 48.1/km^{2} (125/sq mi)
- Time zone: UTC+01:00 (CET)
  - Summer (DST): UTC+02:00 (CEST)
- INSEE/Postal code: 53253 /53800
- ^{1} French Land Register data, which excludes lakes, ponds, glaciers > 1 km^{2} (0.386 sq mi or 247 acres) and river estuaries.

Saint-Saturnin-du-Limet (French pronunciation: [sɛ̃ satyʁnɛ̃ dy limɛ]) is a commune in the Mayenne department in north-western France.

== See also ==
- Communes of the Mayenne department
