= Cosmes =

- Commune
- Coat of arms
- Location of Cosmes
- Location within France Location within Pays de la Loire
- Coordinates: 47°55′15″N 0°52′47″W
- Country: France
- Region: Pays de la Loire
- Department: Mayenne
- Arrondissement: Château-Gontier
- Canton: Cossé-le-Vivien

Government
  - Mayor (2020–2026): Dominique Couëffé
- Area^{1}: 13.68 km^{2} (5.28 sq mi)
- Elevation: 95 m (312 ft)
- Highest elevation: 107 m (351 ft)
- Lowest elevation: 58 m (190 ft)
- Population (2023): 302
  - Density: 22.1/km^{2} (57.2/sq mi)
- Time zone: UTC+01:00 (CET)
  - Summer (DST): UTC+02:00 (CEST)
- INSEE/Postal code: 53075 /53230
- ^{1} French Land Register data, which excludes lakes, ponds, glaciers > 1 km^{2} (0.386 sq mi or 247 acres) and river estuaries.

Cosmes (French pronunciation: [kom]) is a commune in the Mayenne department in north-western France.

== See also ==
- Communes of the Mayenne department
