= Le Buret =

- Commune
- Location of Le Buret
- Location within France Location within Pays de la Loire
- Coordinates: 47°55′24″N 0°30′48″W
- Country: France
- Region: Pays de la Loire
- Department: Mayenne
- Arrondissement: Château-Gontier
- Canton: Meslay-du-Maine

Government
  - Mayor (2020–2026): Didier Catillon
- Area^{1}: 12.92 km^{2} (4.99 sq mi)
- Elevation: 90 m (300 ft)
- Highest elevation: 112 m (367 ft)
- Lowest elevation: 48 m (157 ft)
- Population (2023): 315
  - Density: 24.4/km^{2} (63.1/sq mi)
- Time zone: UTC+01:00 (CET)
  - Summer (DST): UTC+02:00 (CEST)
- INSEE/Postal code: 53046 /53170
- ^{1} French Land Register data, which excludes lakes, ponds, glaciers > 1 km^{2} (0.386 sq mi or 247 acres) and river estuaries.

Le Buret (French pronunciation: [lə byʁɛ]) is a commune in the Mayenne department in northwestern France.

== See also ==
- Communes of Mayenne
