= Coudray, Mayenne =

Coudray
- Commune
- Location of Coudray
- Location within France Location within Pays de la Loire
- Coordinates: 47°47′30″N 0°38′34″W
- Country: France
- Region: Pays de la Loire
- Department: Mayenne
- Arrondissement: Château-Gontier
- Canton: Château-Gontier-sur-Mayenne-1

Government
  - Mayor (2020–2026): Joël Gadbin
- Area^{1}: 11.01 km^{2} (4.25 sq mi)
- Elevation: 64 m (210 ft)
- Highest elevation: 83 m (272 ft)
- Lowest elevation: 27 m (89 ft)
- Population (2023): 869
  - Density: 78.9/km^{2} (204/sq mi)
- Time zone: UTC+01:00 (CET)
  - Summer (DST): UTC+02:00 (CEST)
- INSEE/Postal code: 53078 /53200
- ^{1} French Land Register data, which excludes lakes, ponds, glaciers > 1 km^{2} (0.386 sq mi or 247 acres) and river estuaries.

Coudray (French pronunciation: [kudʁɛ]) is a commune in the Mayenne department in north-western France.

== See also ==
- Communes of the Mayenne department
