= Bouchamps-lès-Craon =

- Commune
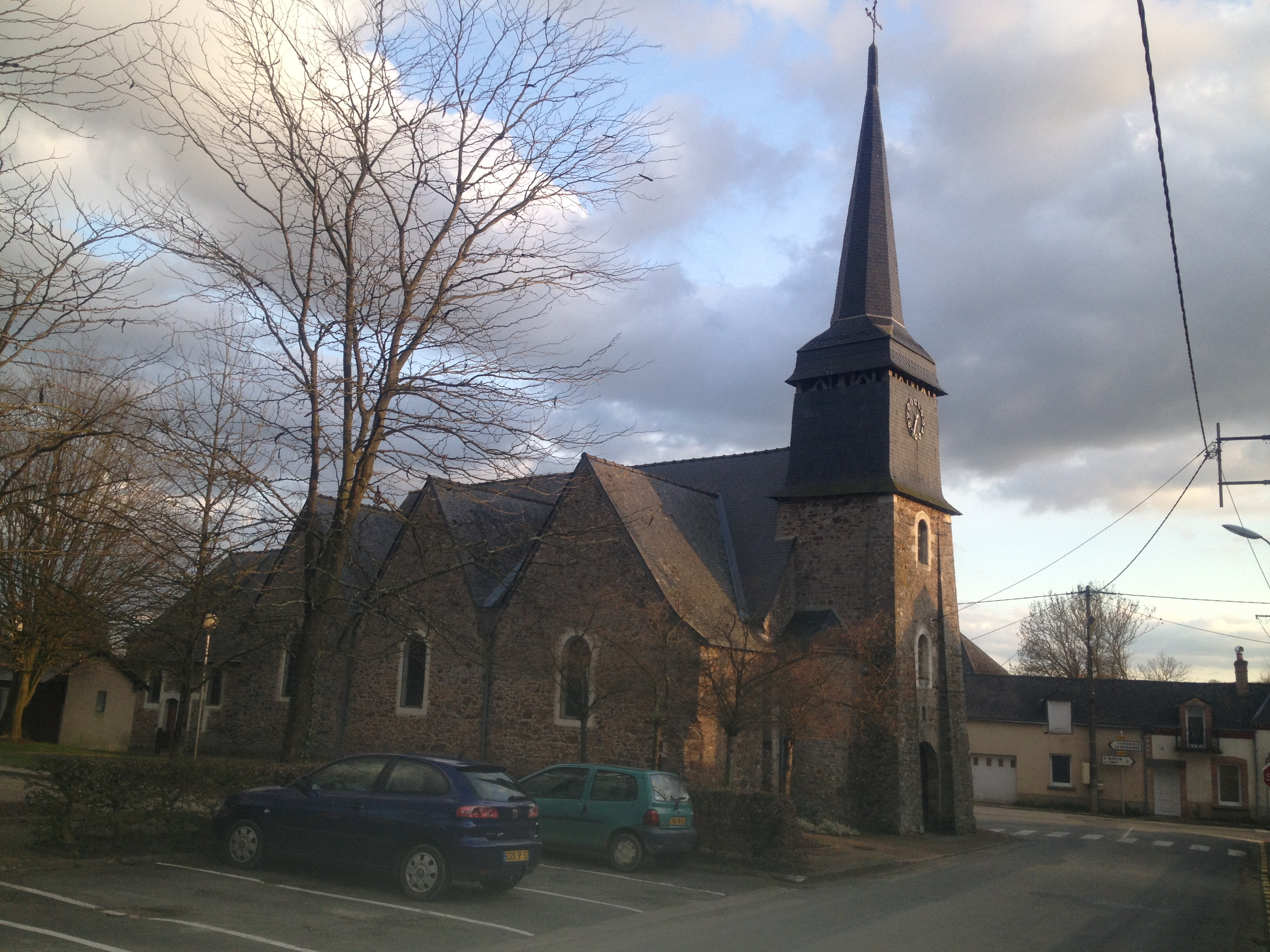
- The church in Bouchamps-lès-Craon

- Coat of arms
- Location of Bouchamps-lès-Craon
- Location within France Location within Pays de la Loire
- Coordinates: 47°48′56″N 0°59′28″W
- Country: France
- Region: Pays de la Loire
- Department: Mayenne
- Arrondissement: Château-Gontier
- Canton: Château-Gontier-sur-Mayenne-2

Government
  - Mayor (2020–2026): Jean-Eudes Gaubert
- Area^{1}: 18.15 km^{2} (7.01 sq mi)
- Elevation: 106 m (348 ft)
- Highest elevation: 104 m (341 ft)
- Lowest elevation: 31 m (102 ft)
- Population (2023): 595
  - Density: 32.8/km^{2} (84.9/sq mi)
- Time zone: UTC+01:00 (CET)
  - Summer (DST): UTC+02:00 (CEST)
- INSEE/Postal code: 53035 /53800
- ^{1} French Land Register data, which excludes lakes, ponds, glaciers > 1 km^{2} (0.386 sq mi or 247 acres) and river estuaries.

Bouchamps-lès-Craon (French pronunciation: [buʃɑ̃ lɛ kʁɑ̃], literally Bouchamps near Craon) is a commune in the Mayenne department in northwestern France.

== Geography ==
The river Oudon forms most of the commune's eastern border.

== Population ==
Historical population
Year	Pop.	±% p.a.
1968	525	—
1975	528	+0.08%
1982	518	−0.27%
1990	507	−0.27%
1999	514	+0.15%
2007	557	+1.01%
2012	563	+0.21%
2017	564	+0.04%
2023	595	+0.90%
Source: INSEE

== See also ==
- Communes of Mayenne
