= Pommerieux =

- Commune
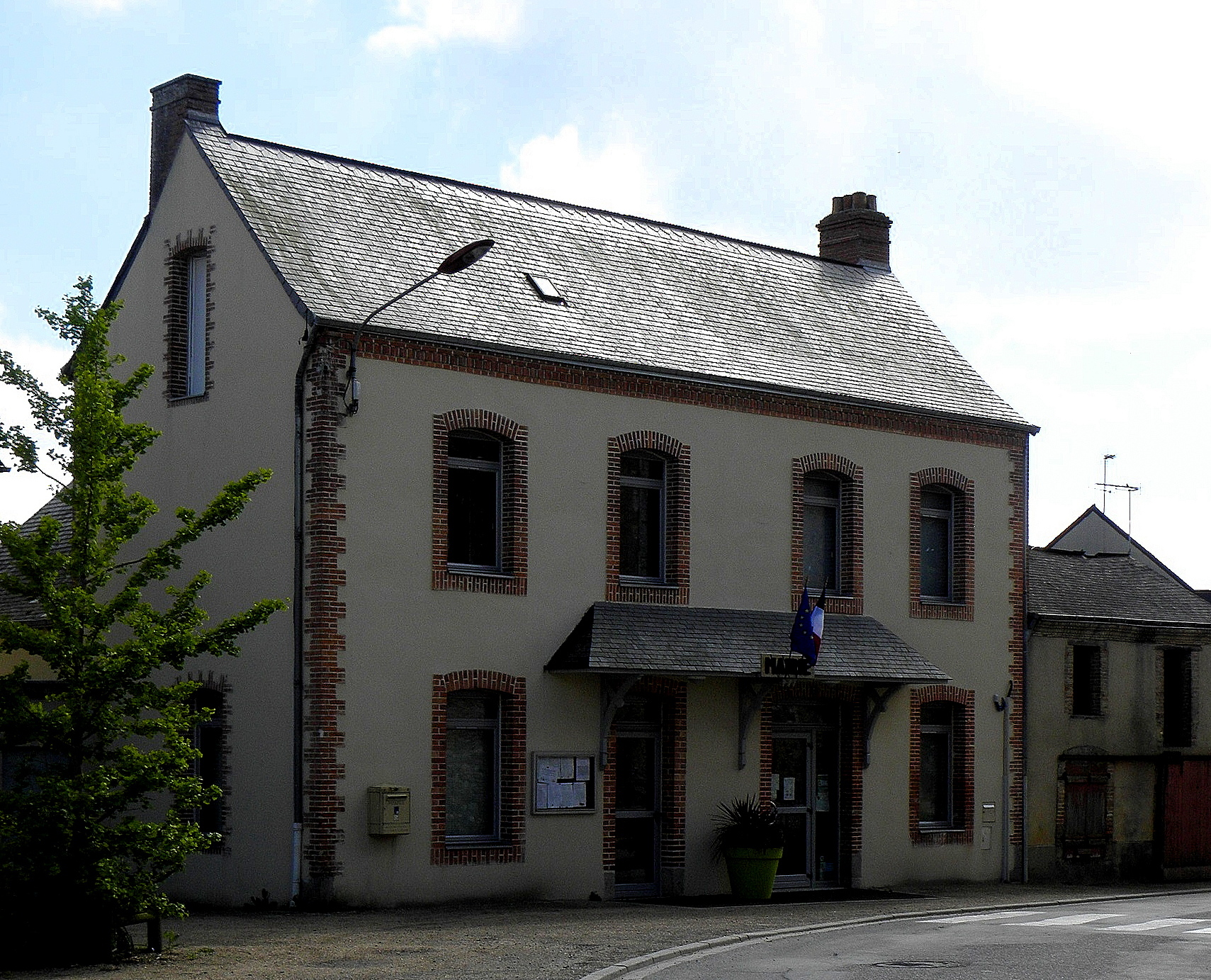
- Pommerieux Town hall

- Coat of arms
- Location of Pommerieux
- Location within France Location within Pays de la Loire
- Coordinates: 47°49′28″N 0°53′50″W
- Country: France
- Region: Pays de la Loire
- Department: Mayenne
- Arrondissement: Château-Gontier
- Canton: Château-Gontier-sur-Mayenne-2

Government
  - Mayor (2020–2026): Vincent Restif
- Area^{1}: 23.2 km^{2} (9.0 sq mi)
- Elevation: 60 m (200 ft)
- Highest elevation: 83 m (272 ft)
- Lowest elevation: 37 m (121 ft)
- Population (2023): 667
  - Density: 28.8/km^{2} (74.5/sq mi)
- Time zone: UTC+01:00 (CET)
  - Summer (DST): UTC+02:00 (CEST)
- INSEE/Postal code: 53180 /53400
- ^{1} French Land Register data, which excludes lakes, ponds, glaciers > 1 km^{2} (0.386 sq mi or 247 acres) and river estuaries.

Pommerieux (French pronunciation: [pɔm(ə)ʁjø]) is a commune in the Mayenne department in north-western France.

== See also ==
- Communes of Mayenne
