= Bannes, Mayenne =

Bannes
- Commune
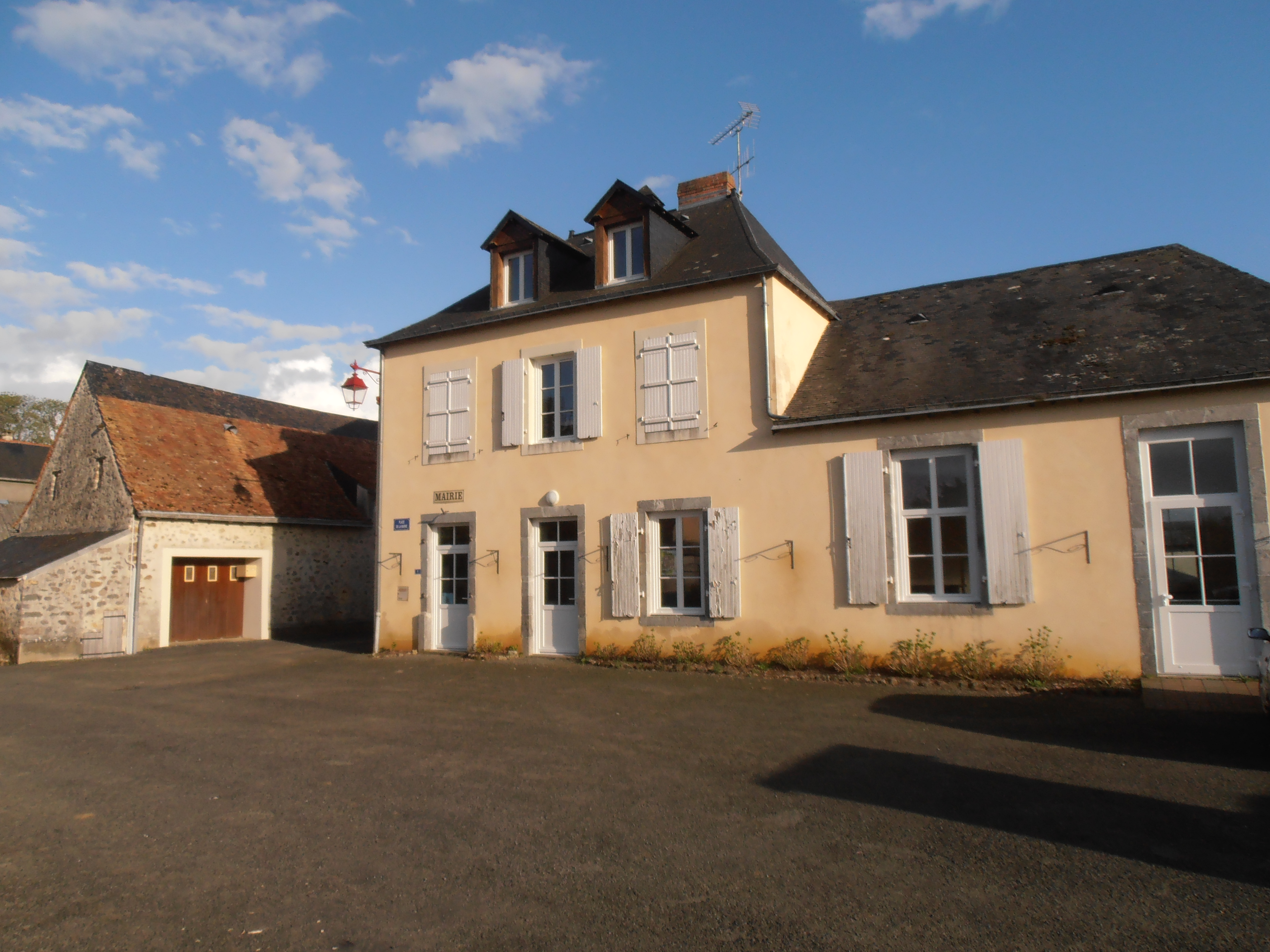
- The town hall in Bannes
- Location of Bannes
- Location within France Location within Pays de la Loire
- Coordinates: 47°58′57″N 0°21′01″W
- Country: France
- Region: Pays de la Loire
- Department: Mayenne
- Arrondissement: Château-Gontier
- Canton: Meslay-du-Maine

Government
  - Mayor (2020–2026): Jérôme Gasnier
- Area^{1}: 8.32 km^{2} (3.21 sq mi)
- Elevation: 80 m (260 ft)
- Highest elevation: 102 m (335 ft)
- Lowest elevation: 58 m (190 ft)
- Population (2023): 119
  - Density: 14.3/km^{2} (37.0/sq mi)
- Time zone: UTC+01:00 (CET)
  - Summer (DST): UTC+02:00 (CEST)
- INSEE/Postal code: 53019 /53340
- ^{1} French Land Register data, which excludes lakes, ponds, glaciers > 1 km^{2} (0.386 sq mi or 247 acres) and river estuaries.

Bannes (French pronunciation: [ban]) is a commune in the Mayenne department in northwestern France.

== Population ==
Historical population
Year	Pop.	±% p.a.
1968	185	—
1975	164	−1.71%
1982	142	−2.04%
1990	131	−1.00%
1999	118	−1.15%
2007	136	+1.79%
2012	131	−0.75%
2017	120	−1.74%
2023	119	−0.14%
Source: INSEE

== See also ==
- Communes of Mayenne
