= Origné =

- Commune
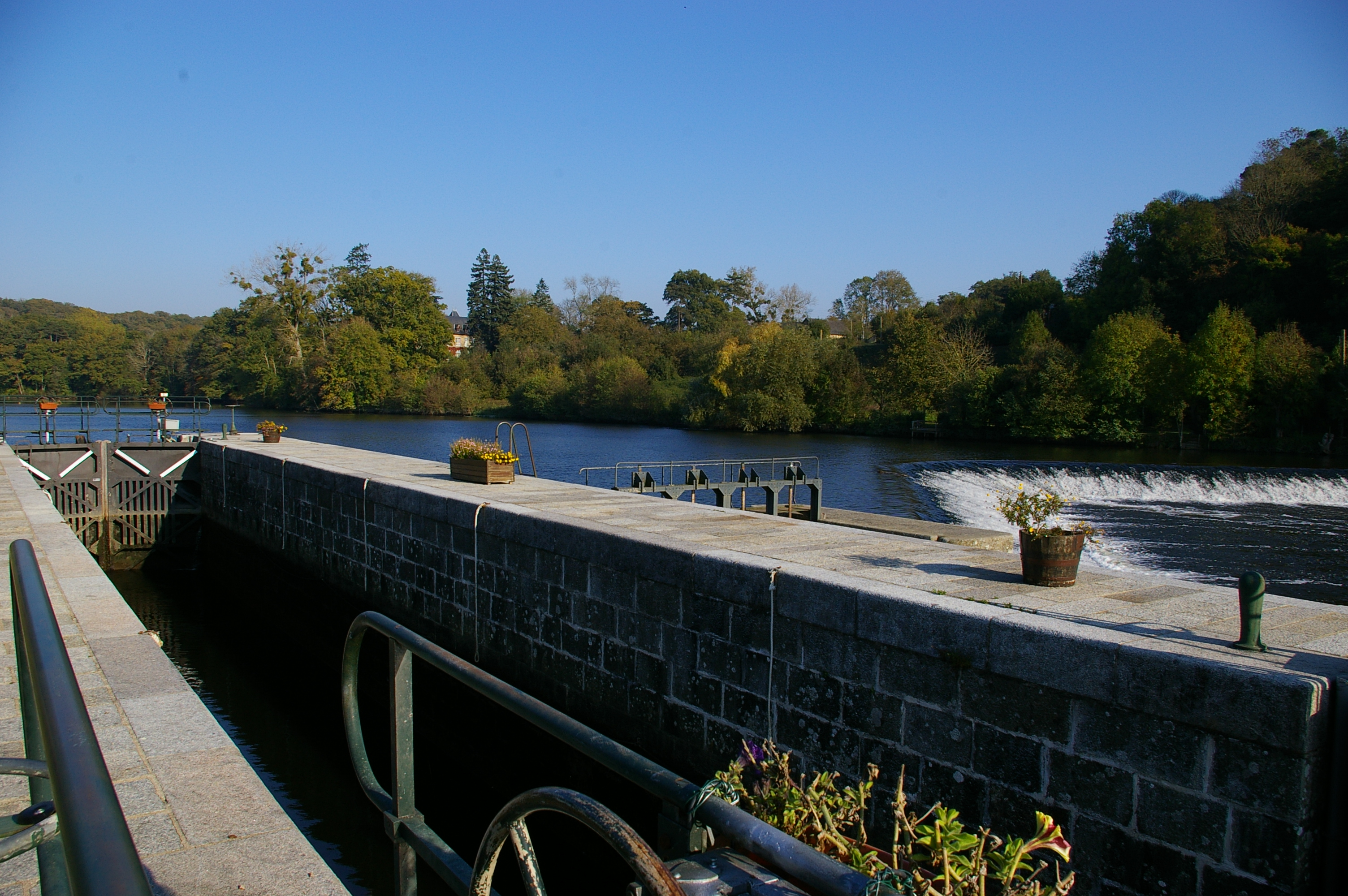
- The Mayenne river in Origné

- Coat of arms
- Location of Origné
- Location within France Location within Pays de la Loire
- Coordinates: 47°57′12″N 0°43′43″W
- Country: France
- Region: Pays de la Loire
- Department: Mayenne
- Arrondissement: Château-Gontier
- Canton: Château-Gontier-sur-Mayenne-1

Government
  - Mayor (2020–2026): Christophe Lemarié
- Area^{1}: 10.05 km^{2} (3.88 sq mi)
- Elevation: 100 m (330 ft)
- Highest elevation: 108 m (354 ft)
- Lowest elevation: 32 m (105 ft)
- Population (2023): 390
  - Density: 39/km^{2} (100/sq mi)
- Time zone: UTC+01:00 (CET)
  - Summer (DST): UTC+02:00 (CEST)
- INSEE/Postal code: 53172 /53360
- ^{1} French Land Register data, which excludes lakes, ponds, glaciers > 1 km^{2} (0.386 sq mi or 247 acres) and river estuaries.

Origné (French pronunciation: [ɔʁiɲe]) is a commune in the Mayenne department in northwestern France.

== See also ==
- Communes of Mayenne
