= Simplé =

- Commune
- Coat of arms
- Location of Simplé
- Location within France Location within Pays de la Loire
- Coordinates: 47°53′17″N 0°51′00″W
- Country: France
- Region: Pays de la Loire
- Department: Mayenne
- Arrondissement: Château-Gontier
- Canton: Cossé-le-Vivien

Government
  - Mayor (2020–2026): Yannick Clavreul
- Area^{1}: 9.1 km^{2} (3.5 sq mi)
- Elevation: 82 m (269 ft)
- Highest elevation: 97 m (318 ft)
- Lowest elevation: 50 m (160 ft)
- Population (2023): 380
  - Density: 42/km^{2} (110/sq mi)
- Time zone: UTC+01:00 (CET)
  - Summer (DST): UTC+02:00 (CEST)
- INSEE/Postal code: 53260 /53360
- ^{1} French Land Register data, which excludes lakes, ponds, glaciers > 1 km^{2} (0.386 sq mi or 247 acres) and river estuaries.

Simplé (French pronunciation: [sɛ̃ple]) is a commune in the Mayenne department in north-western France.

== See also ==
- Communes of the Mayenne department
