= Astillé =

- Commune
- Location of Astillé
- Location within France Location within Pays de la Loire
- Coordinates: 47°57′50″N 0°51′02″W
- Country: France
- Region: Pays de la Loire
- Department: Mayenne
- Arrondissement: Château-Gontier
- Canton: Cossé-le-Vivien
- Intercommunality: CC Pays Craon

Government
  - Mayor (2020–2026): Loïc Derouet
- Area^{1}: 20.73 km^{2} (8.00 sq mi)
- Elevation: 118 m (387 ft)
- Highest elevation: 111 m (364 ft)
- Lowest elevation: 73 m (240 ft)
- Population (2023): 895
  - Density: 43.2/km^{2} (112/sq mi)
- Time zone: UTC+01:00 (CET)
  - Summer (DST): UTC+02:00 (CEST)
- INSEE/Postal code: 53011 /53230
- ^{1} French Land Register data, which excludes lakes, ponds, glaciers > 1 km^{2} (0.386 sq mi or 247 acres) and river estuaries.

Astillé (French pronunciation: [astije]) is a commune in the Mayenne department in northwestern France.

== Population ==
Historical population
Year	Pop.	±% p.a.
1968	488	—
1975	469	−0.57%
1982	506	+1.09%
1990	521	+0.37%
1999	547	+0.54%
2007	696	+3.06%
2012	817	+3.26%
2017	870	+1.27%
2023	895	+0.47%
Source: INSEE

== See also ==
- Communes of Mayenne
