= Fontaine-Couverte =

- Commune
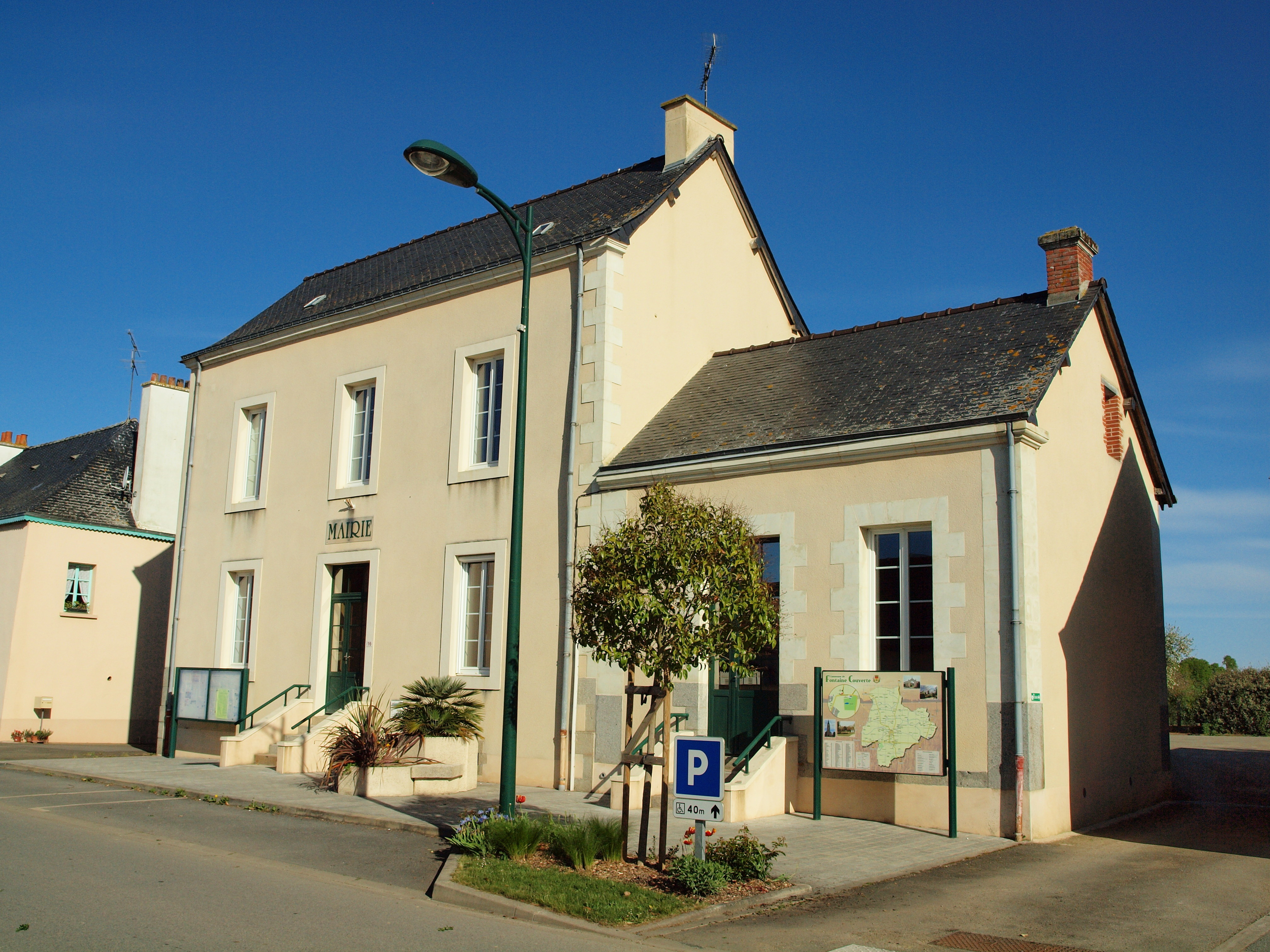
- Town hall
- Location of Fontaine-Couverte
- Location within France Location within Pays de la Loire
- Coordinates: 47°54′32″N 1°08′29″W
- Country: France
- Region: Pays de la Loire
- Department: Mayenne
- Arrondissement: Château-Gontier
- Canton: Cossé-le-Vivien

Government
  - Mayor (2020–2026): Jérôme Basle
- Area^{1}: 21.65 km^{2} (8.36 sq mi)
- Elevation: 80 m (260 ft)
- Highest elevation: 102 m (335 ft)
- Lowest elevation: 59 m (194 ft)
- Population (2023): 420
  - Density: 19/km^{2} (50/sq mi)
- Time zone: UTC+01:00 (CET)
  - Summer (DST): UTC+02:00 (CEST)
- INSEE/Postal code: 53098 /53350
- ^{1} French Land Register data, which excludes lakes, ponds, glaciers > 1 km^{2} (0.386 sq mi or 247 acres) and river estuaries.

Fontaine-Couverte (French pronunciation: [fɔ̃tɛn kuvɛʁt]) is a commune in the Mayenne department in north-western France.

== See also ==
- Communes of the Mayenne department
