= Chérancé, Mayenne =

Chérancé
- Commune
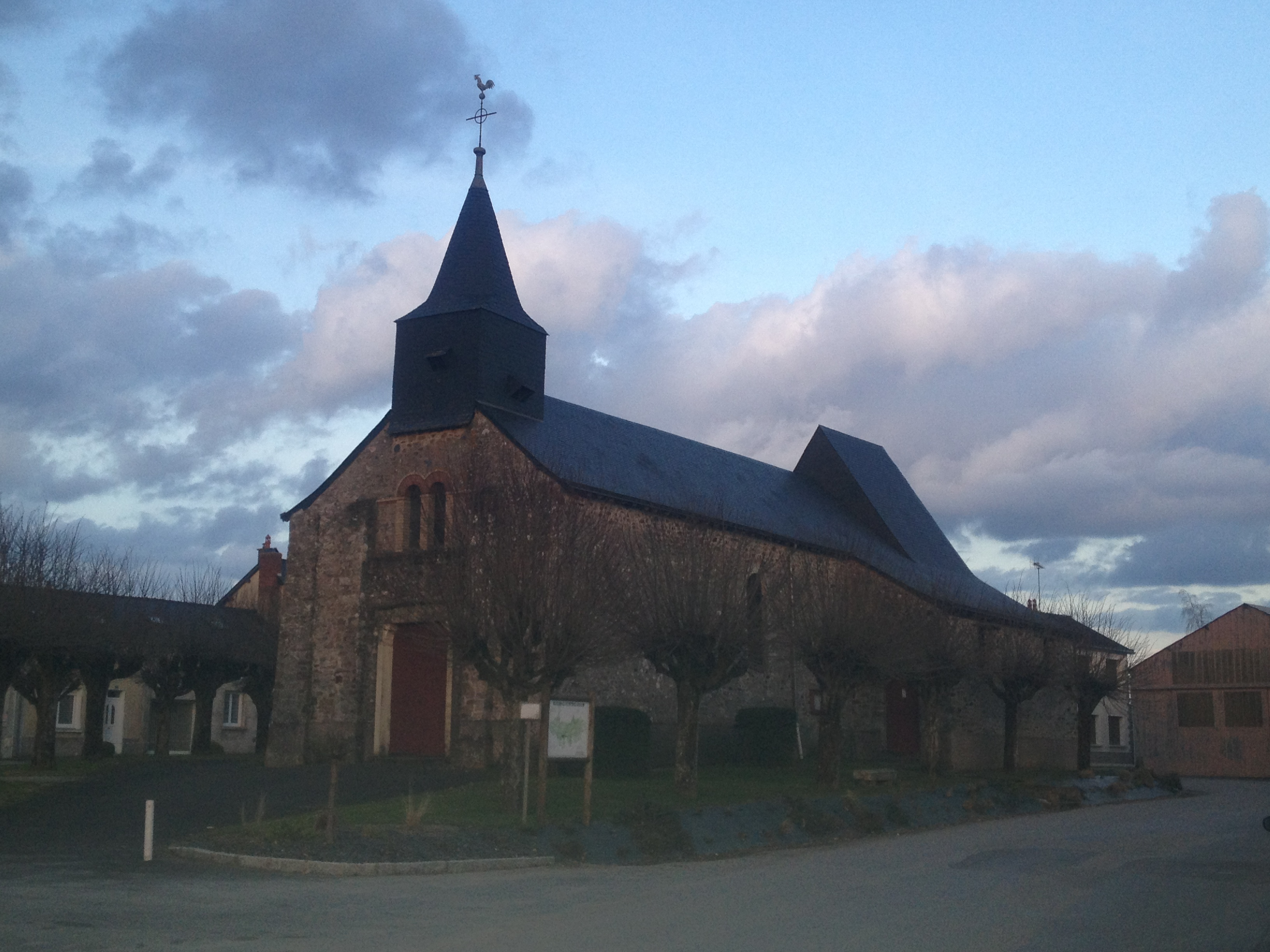
- The church in Chérancé
- Location of Chérancé
- Location within France Location within Pays de la Loire
- Coordinates: 47°47′46″N 0°56′03″W
- Country: France
- Region: Pays de la Loire
- Department: Mayenne
- Arrondissement: Château-Gontier
- Canton: Château-Gontier-sur-Mayenne-2

Government
  - Mayor (2020–2026): Jackie Vallée
- Area^{1}: 8.73 km^{2} (3.37 sq mi)
- Elevation: 54 m (177 ft)
- Highest elevation: 83 m (272 ft)
- Lowest elevation: 31 m (102 ft)
- Population (2023): 155
  - Density: 17.8/km^{2} (46.0/sq mi)
- Time zone: UTC+01:00 (CET)
  - Summer (DST): UTC+02:00 (CEST)
- INSEE/Postal code: 53068 /53400
- ^{1} French Land Register data, which excludes lakes, ponds, glaciers > 1 km^{2} (0.386 sq mi or 247 acres) and river estuaries.

Chérancé (French pronunciation: [ʃeʁɑ̃se]) is a commune in the Mayenne department in north-western France.

== Geography ==
The river Oudon forms the commune's south-western border.

== See also ==
- Communes of the Mayenne department
