= Cossé-en-Champagne =

- Commune
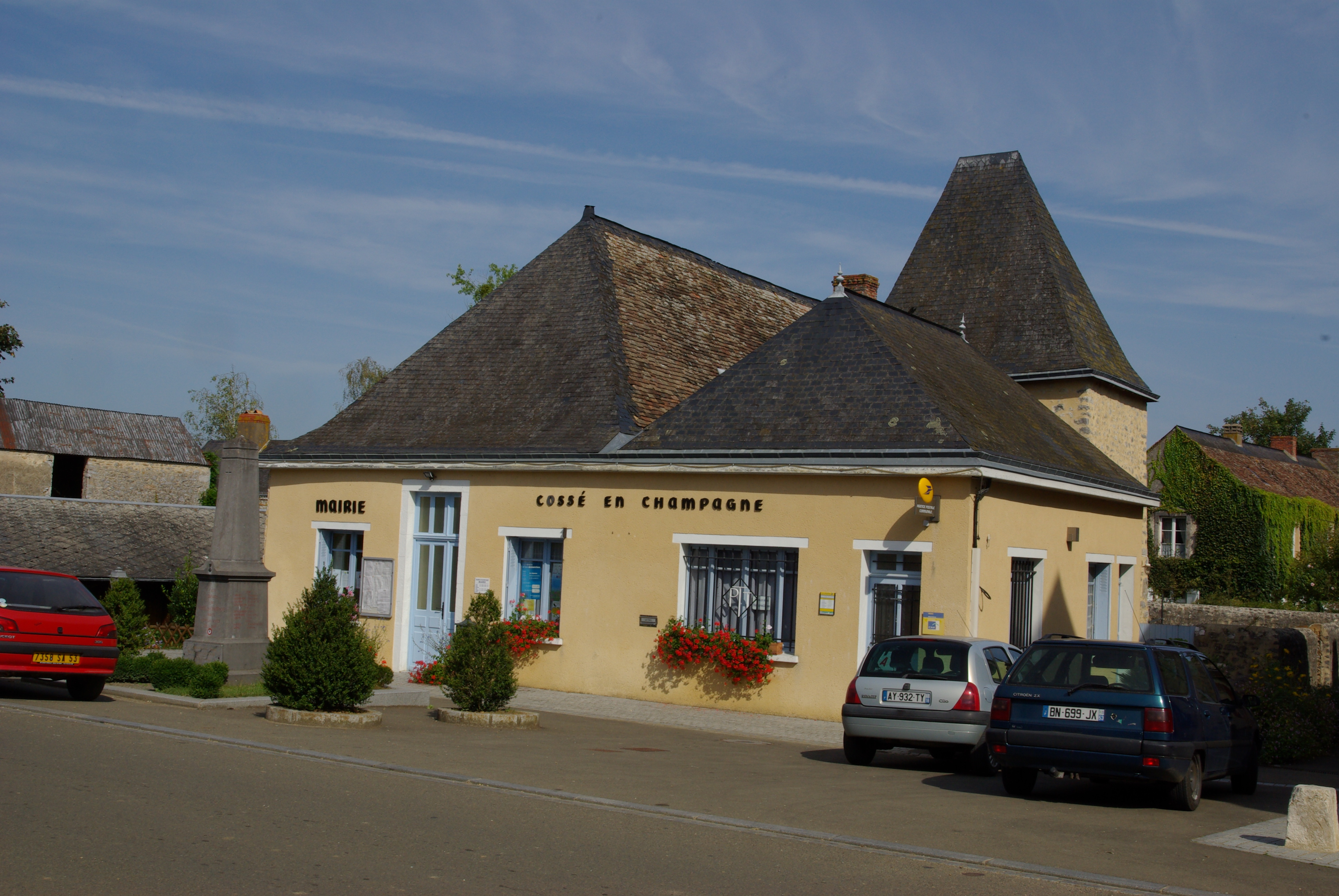
- The town hall in Cossé-en-Champagne
- Location of Cossé-en-Champagne
- Location within France Location within Pays de la Loire
- Coordinates: 47°57′48″N 0°19′58″W
- Country: France
- Region: Pays de la Loire
- Department: Mayenne
- Arrondissement: Château-Gontier
- Canton: Meslay-du-Maine

Government
  - Mayor (2020–2026): Stéphane Foucher
- Area^{1}: 20.88 km^{2} (8.06 sq mi)
- Elevation: 83 m (272 ft)
- Highest elevation: 101 m (331 ft)
- Lowest elevation: 47 m (154 ft)
- Population (2023): 299
  - Density: 14.3/km^{2} (37.1/sq mi)
- Time zone: UTC+01:00 (CET)
  - Summer (DST): UTC+02:00 (CEST)
- INSEE/Postal code: 53076 /53340
- ^{1} French Land Register data, which excludes lakes, ponds, glaciers > 1 km^{2} (0.386 sq mi or 247 acres) and river estuaries.

Cossé-en-Champagne (French pronunciation: [kɔse ɑ̃ ʃɑ̃paɲ]) is a commune in the Mayenne department in north-western France.

== Sights ==
Its church, called Notre-Dame, is known for its Romanesque frescoes, some dating from the 15th century, and is listed as a historic monument in France.

== See also ==
- Communes of the Mayenne department
