= Congrier =

- Commune
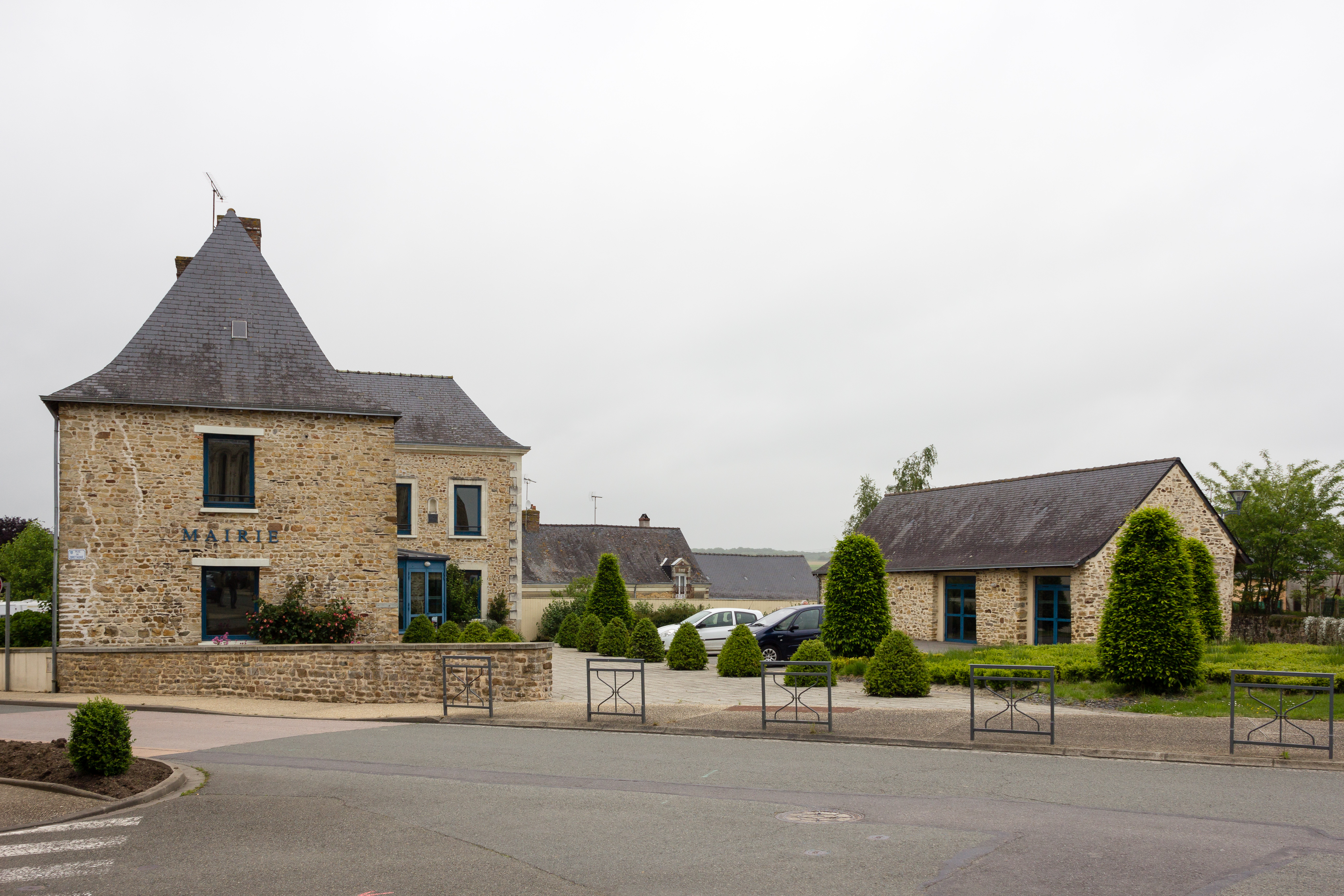
- Town hall

- Coat of arms
- Location of Congrier
- Location within France Location within Pays de la Loire
- Coordinates: 47°48′39″N 1°06′57″W
- Country: France
- Region: Pays de la Loire
- Department: Mayenne
- Arrondissement: Château-Gontier
- Canton: Cossé-le-Vivien

Government
  - Mayor (2020–2026): Hervé Tison
- Area^{1}: 24.28 km^{2} (9.37 sq mi)
- Elevation: 82 m (269 ft)
- Highest elevation: 106 m (348 ft)
- Lowest elevation: 56 m (184 ft)
- Population (2023): 932
  - Density: 38.4/km^{2} (99.4/sq mi)
- Time zone: UTC+01:00 (CET)
  - Summer (DST): UTC+02:00 (CEST)
- INSEE/Postal code: 53073 /53800
- ^{1} French Land Register data, which excludes lakes, ponds, glaciers > 1 km^{2} (0.386 sq mi or 247 acres) and river estuaries.

Congrier (French pronunciation: [kɔ̃ɡʁije]) is a commune in the Mayenne department in north-western France. The town of Congrier belongs to the canton of Cossé-le-Vivien and the arrondissement of Château-Gontier.

The inhabitants of Congrier are called Congriéens; their number in 2016 was 921.

== Geography ==
The Semnon has its source in the commune.

The town's surface is 24.3 km^{2}. It is situated at an altitude of about 80 meters.

== See also ==
- Communes of the Mayenne department
