= La Selle-Craonnaise =

- Commune
- Coat of arms
- Location of La Selle-Craonnaise
- Location within France Location within Pays de la Loire
- Coordinates: 47°50′37″N 1°02′28″W
- Country: France
- Region: Pays de la Loire
- Department: Mayenne
- Arrondissement: Château-Gontier
- Canton: Cossé-le-Vivien

Government
  - Mayor (2020–2026): Joseph Jugé
- Area^{1}: 29.17 km^{2} (11.26 sq mi)
- Elevation: 60 m (200 ft)
- Highest elevation: 107 m (351 ft)
- Lowest elevation: 41 m (135 ft)
- Population (2023): 895
  - Density: 30.7/km^{2} (79.5/sq mi)
- Time zone: UTC+01:00 (CET)
  - Summer (DST): UTC+02:00 (CEST)
- INSEE/Postal code: 53258 /53800
- ^{1} French Land Register data, which excludes lakes, ponds, glaciers > 1 km^{2} (0.386 sq mi or 247 acres) and river estuaries.

La Selle-Craonnaise (French pronunciation: [la sɛl kʁanɛz]) is a commune in the Mayenne department in north-western France.

== Sights ==
- Church of Saint-Martin, 12th century to 19th century.
- 17th century Castle Saint-Amadour and its park.
- Pond of the Rincerie, leisure center.

== See also ==
- Communes of the Mayenne department
