= Arquenay =

- Commune
- Location of Arquenay
- Location within France Location within Pays de la Loire
- Coordinates: 47°59′15″N 0°34′08″W
- Country: France
- Region: Pays de la Loire
- Department: Mayenne
- Arrondissement: Château-Gontier
- Canton: Meslay-du-Maine
- Intercommunality: CC Pays Meslay-Grez

Government
  - Mayor (2020–2026): Jérémy Bertrel
- Area^{1}: 25.25 km^{2} (9.75 sq mi)
- Elevation: 80 m (260 ft)
- Highest elevation: 107 m (351 ft)
- Lowest elevation: 68 m (223 ft)
- Population (2023): 674
  - Density: 26.7/km^{2} (69.1/sq mi)
- Time zone: UTC+01:00 (CET)
  - Summer (DST): UTC+02:00 (CEST)
- INSEE/Postal code: 53009 /53170
- ^{1} French Land Register data, which excludes lakes, ponds, glaciers > 1 km^{2} (0.386 sq mi or 247 acres) and river estuaries.

Arquenay (French pronunciation: [aʁkənɛ]) is a commune in the Mayenne department in north-western France.

== Population ==
Historical population
Year	Pop.	±% p.a.
1968	456	—
1975	427	−0.93%
1982	404	−0.79%
1990	473	+1.99%
1999	508	+0.80%
2007	640	+2.93%
2012	648	+0.25%
2017	638	−0.31%
2023	674	+0.92%
Source: INSEE

== See also ==
- Communes of Mayenne
