= Ruillé-Froid-Fonds =

- Commune
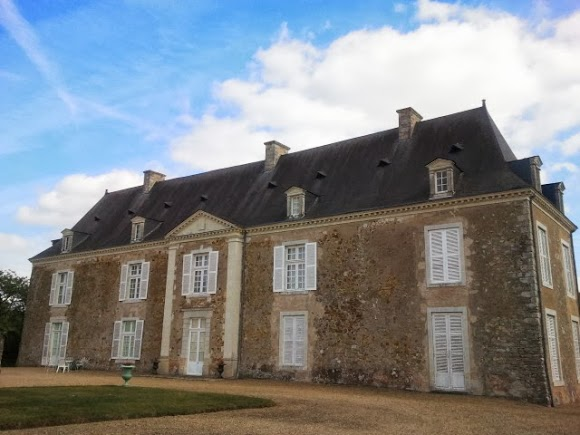
- The Château du Puy, in Ruillé-Froid-Fonds
- Location of Ruillé-Froid-Fonds
- Location within France Location within Pays de la Loire
- Coordinates: 47°54′05″N 0°38′27″W
- Country: France
- Region: Pays de la Loire
- Department: Mayenne
- Arrondissement: Château-Gontier
- Canton: Meslay-du-Maine

Government
  - Mayor (2020–2026): Marie-Claude Helbert
- Area^{1}: 23.56 km^{2} (9.10 sq mi)
- Elevation: 108 m (354 ft)
- Highest elevation: 119 m (390 ft)
- Lowest elevation: 58 m (190 ft)
- Population (2023): 583
  - Density: 24.7/km^{2} (64.1/sq mi)
- Time zone: UTC+01:00 (CET)
  - Summer (DST): UTC+02:00 (CEST)
- INSEE/Postal code: 53193 /53170
- ^{1} French Land Register data, which excludes lakes, ponds, glaciers > 1 km^{2} (0.386 sq mi or 247 acres) and river estuaries.

Ruillé-Froid-Fonds (French pronunciation: [ʁɥije fʁwa fɔ̃]) is a commune in the Mayenne department in north-western France.

== See also ==
- Communes of Mayenne
