= La Cropte =

- Commune
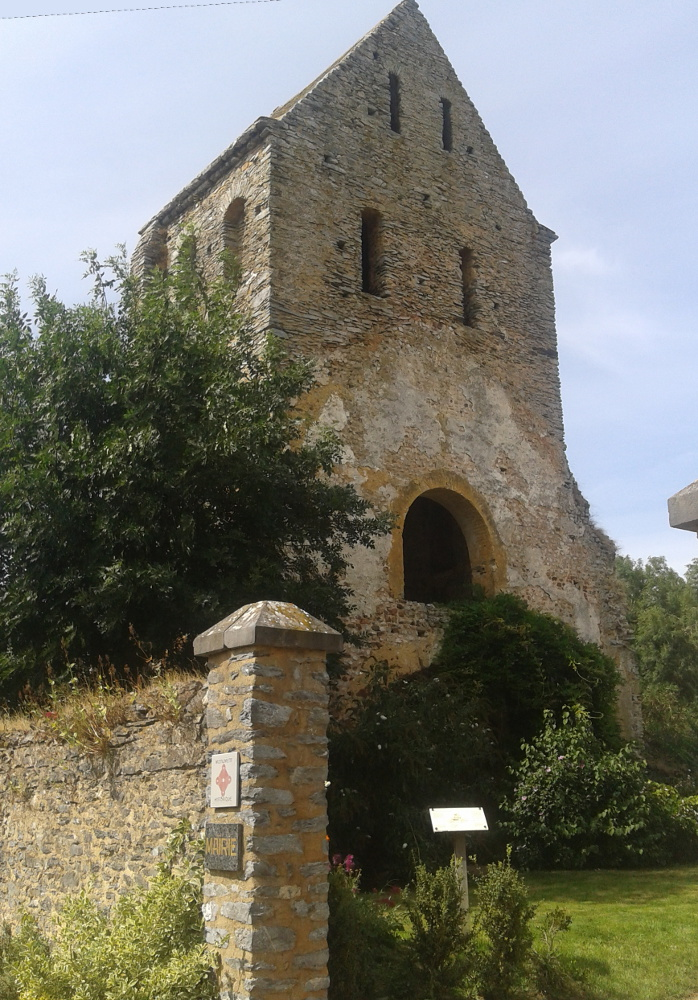
- The tower of the old church of La Cropte
- Location of La Cropte
- Location within France Location within Pays de la Loire
- Coordinates: 47°57′32″N 0°29′30″W
- Country: France
- Region: Pays de la Loire
- Department: Mayenne
- Arrondissement: Château-Gontier
- Canton: Meslay-du-Maine
- Area^{1}: 14.15 km^{2} (5.46 sq mi)
- Elevation: 61 m (200 ft)
- Highest elevation: 87 m (285 ft)
- Lowest elevation: 51 m (167 ft)
- Population (2023): 235
  - Density: 16.6/km^{2} (43.0/sq mi)
- Time zone: UTC+01:00 (CET)
  - Summer (DST): UTC+02:00 (CEST)
- INSEE/Postal code: 53087 /53170
- ^{1} French Land Register data, which excludes lakes, ponds, glaciers > 1 km^{2} (0.386 sq mi or 247 acres) and river estuaries.

La Cropte is a commune in the Mayenne department in north-western France.

== Geography ==
The Vaige forms most of the commune's north-western border, then flows southeastwards through the middle of the commune.

== See also ==
- Communes of the Mayenne department
