= Livré-la-Touche =

- Commune
- Location of Livré-la-Touche
- Location within France Location within Pays de la Loire
- Coordinates: 47°52′55″N 0°58′48″W
- Country: France
- Region: Pays de la Loire
- Department: Mayenne
- Arrondissement: Château-Gontier
- Canton: Cossé-le-Vivien

Government
  - Mayor (2020–2026): Michel Raimbault
- Area^{1}: 30.08 km^{2} (11.61 sq mi)
- Elevation: 100 m (330 ft)
- Highest elevation: 90 m (300 ft)
- Lowest elevation: 39 m (128 ft)
- Population (2023): 729
  - Density: 24.2/km^{2} (62.8/sq mi)
- Time zone: UTC+01:00 (CET)
  - Summer (DST): UTC+02:00 (CEST)
- INSEE/Postal code: 53135 /53400
- ^{1} French Land Register data, which excludes lakes, ponds, glaciers > 1 km^{2} (0.386 sq mi or 247 acres) and river estuaries.

Livré-la-Touche (French pronunciation: [livʁe la tuʃ]) is a commune in the Mayenne department in north-western France. Prior to October 6, 2008, it was known as Livré.

== Geography ==
The river Oudon forms most of the commune's eastern border.

== See also ==
- Communes of the Mayenne department
