= La Boissière, Mayenne =

La Boissière
- Commune
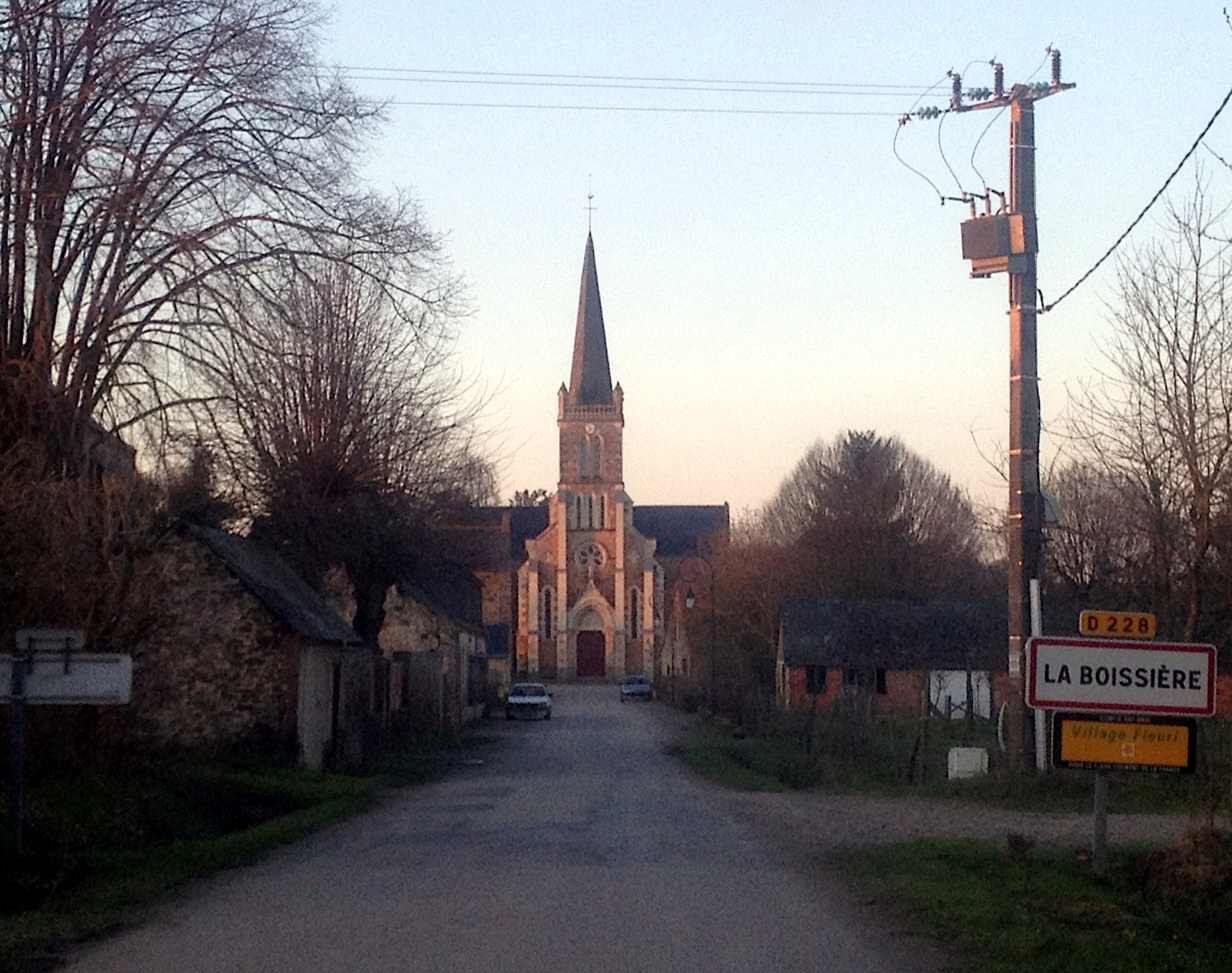
- The road into La Boissière
- Location of La Boissière
- Location within France Location within Pays de la Loire
- Coordinates: 47°46′48″N 0°58′48″W
- Country: France
- Region: Pays de la Loire
- Department: Mayenne
- Arrondissement: Château-Gontier
- Canton: Cossé-le-Vivien

Government
  - Mayor (2020–2026): Jean-Pierre Tessier
- Area^{1}: 6.32 km^{2} (2.44 sq mi)
- Elevation: 70 m (230 ft)
- Highest elevation: 98 m (322 ft)
- Lowest elevation: 34 m (112 ft)
- Population (2023): 115
  - Density: 18.2/km^{2} (47.1/sq mi)
- Time zone: UTC+01:00 (CET)
  - Summer (DST): UTC+02:00 (CEST)
- INSEE/Postal code: 53033 /53800
- ^{1} French Land Register data, which excludes lakes, ponds, glaciers > 1 km^{2} (0.386 sq mi or 247 acres) and river estuaries.

La Boissière (French pronunciation: [la bwasjɛʁ]) is a commune in the Mayenne department in northwestern France.

== Population ==
Historical population
Year	Pop.	±% p.a.
1968	175	—
1975	158	−1.45%
1982	131	−2.64%
1990	152	+1.88%
1999	111	−3.43%
2007	121	+1.08%
2012	129	+1.29%
2017	117	−1.93%
2023	115	−0.29%
Source: INSEE

== See also ==
- Communes of Mayenne
