= Canton of Cossé-le-Vivien =

Coordinates: 47.95°N 0.91°W

The canton of Cossé-le-Vivien is an administrative division of the Mayenne department, northwestern France. Its borders were modified at the French canton reorganisation which came into effect in March 2015. Its seat is in Cossé-le-Vivien.

It consists of the following communes:

1. Astillé
2. Athée
3. Ballots
4. La Boissière
5. Brains-sur-les-Marches
6. La Chapelle-Craonnaise
7. Congrier
8. Cosmes
9. Cossé-le-Vivien
10. Courbeveille
11. Cuillé
12. Fontaine-Couverte
13. Gastines
14. Laubrières
15. Livré-la-Touche
16. Méral
17. Quelaines-Saint-Gault
18. Renazé
19. La Roë
20. La Rouaudière
21. Saint-Aignan-sur-Roë
22. Saint-Erblon
23. Saint-Martin-du-Limet
24. Saint-Michel-de-la-Roë
25. Saint-Poix
26. Saint-Saturnin-du-Limet
27. La Selle-Craonnaise
28. Senonnes
29. Simplé
