= Athée, Mayenne =

Athée
- Commune
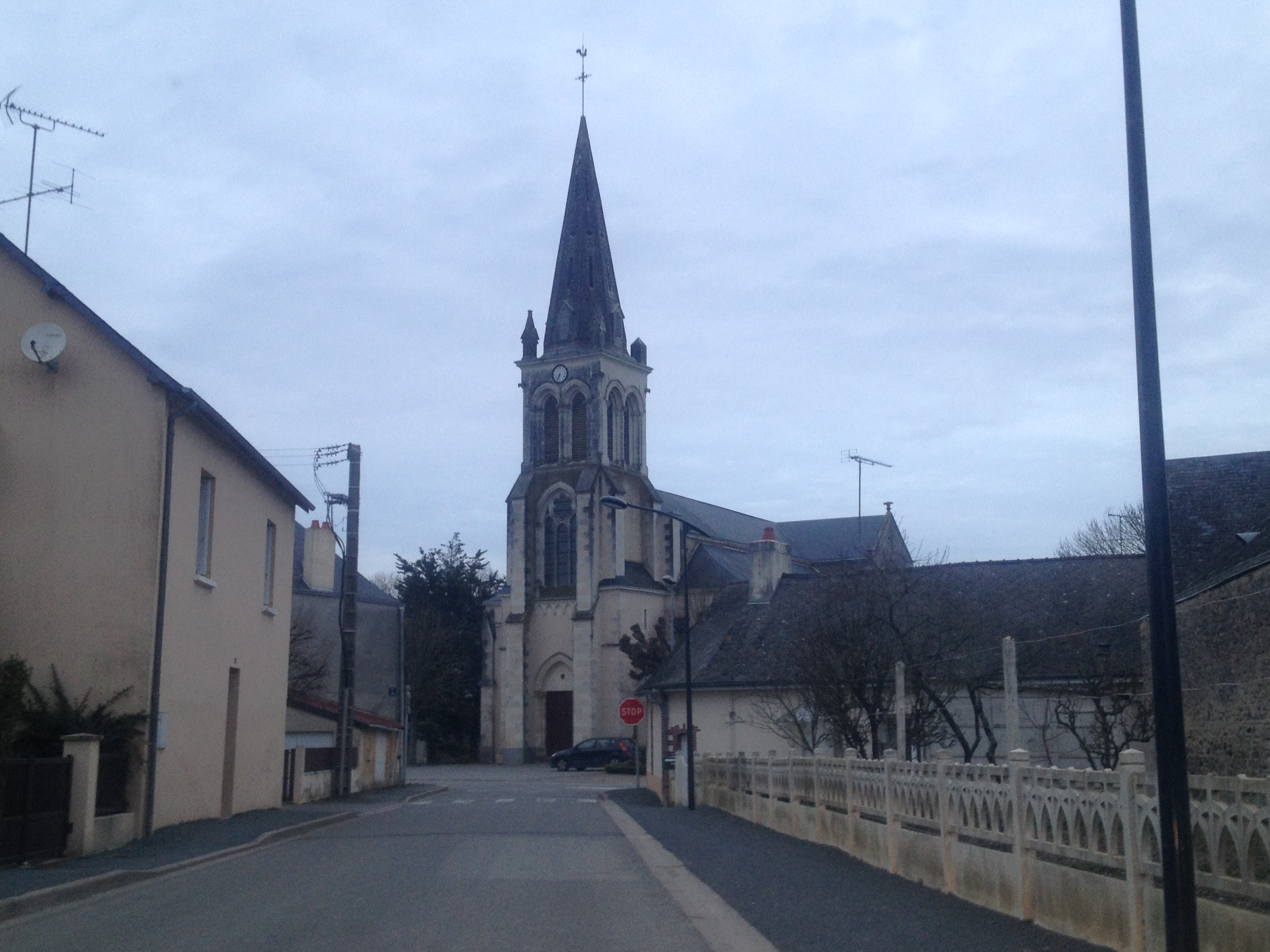
- The church in Athée
- Location of Athée
- Location within France Location within Pays de la Loire
- Coordinates: 47°53′16″N 0°56′56″W
- Country: France
- Region: Pays de la Loire
- Department: Mayenne
- Arrondissement: Château-Gontier
- Canton: Cossé-le-Vivien
- Intercommunality: CC Pays Craon

Government
  - Mayor (2020–2026): Nadine Martin-Ferré
- Area^{1}: 17.23 km^{2} (6.65 sq mi)
- Elevation: 60 m (200 ft)
- Highest elevation: 88 m (289 ft)
- Lowest elevation: 39 m (128 ft)
- Population (2023): 451
  - Density: 26.2/km^{2} (67.8/sq mi)
- Time zone: UTC+01:00 (CET)
  - Summer (DST): UTC+02:00 (CEST)
- INSEE/Postal code: 53012 /53400
- ^{1} French Land Register data, which excludes lakes, ponds, glaciers > 1 km^{2} (0.386 sq mi or 247 acres) and river estuaries.

Athée (French pronunciation: [ate]) is a commune in the Mayenne department in northwestern France.

== Geography ==
The Oudon flows through the commune and forms most of its southwestern border and part of its northeastern border.

== Population ==
Historical population
Year	Pop.	±% p.a.
1968	542	—
1975	466	−2.14%
1982	461	−0.15%
1990	408	−1.52%
1999	488	+2.01%
2007	487	−0.03%
2012	509	+0.89%
2017	495	−0.56%
2023	451	−1.54%
Source: INSEE

== See also ==
- Communes of Mayenne
