= Ballots, Mayenne =

Ballots
- Commune
- Coat of arms
- Location of Ballots
- Location within France Location within Pays de la Loire
- Coordinates: 47°53′45″N 1°02′45″W
- Country: France
- Region: Pays de la Loire
- Department: Mayenne
- Arrondissement: Château-Gontier
- Canton: Cossé-le-Vivien

Government
  - Mayor (2020–2026): François Quargnul
- Area^{1}: 36.01 km^{2} (13.90 sq mi)
- Elevation: 96 m (315 ft)
- Highest elevation: 93 m (305 ft)
- Lowest elevation: 48 m (157 ft)
- Population (2023): 1,278
  - Density: 35.49/km^{2} (91.92/sq mi)
- Time zone: UTC+01:00 (CET)
  - Summer (DST): UTC+02:00 (CEST)
- INSEE/Postal code: 53018 /53350
- ^{1} French Land Register data, which excludes lakes, ponds, glaciers > 1 km^{2} (0.386 sq mi or 247 acres) and river estuaries.

Ballots (French pronunciation: [balo]) is a commune in the Mayenne department in northwestern France.

== Population ==
Historical population
Year	Pop.	±% p.a.
1968	1,242	—
1975	1,129	−1.35%
1982	1,092	−0.47%
1990	1,049	−0.50%
1999	1,036	−0.14%
2007	1,192	+1.77%
2012	1,269	+1.26%
2017	1,281	+0.19%
2023	1,278	−0.04%
Source: INSEE

== See also ==
- Communes of Mayenne
