= La Roë =

- Commune
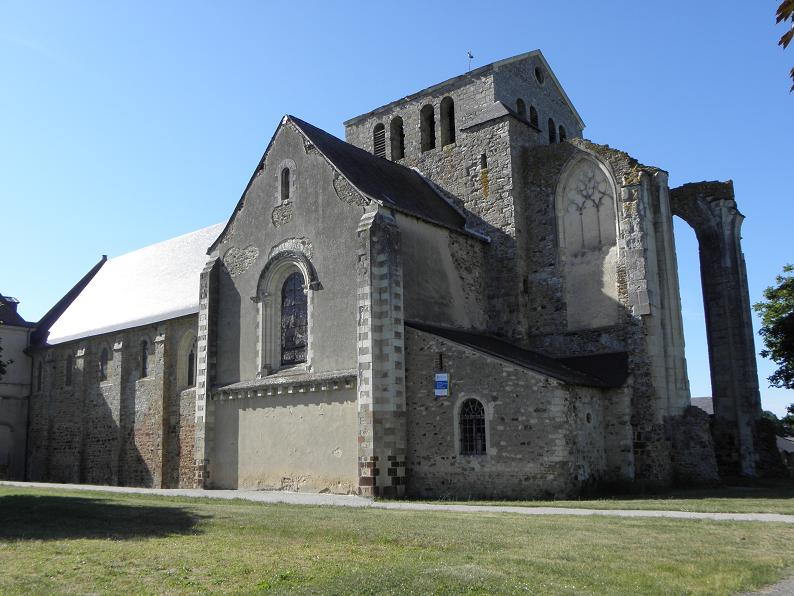
- The La Roë Abbey

- Coat of arms
- Location of La Roë
- Location within France Location within Pays de la Loire
- Coordinates: 47°53′45″N 1°06′36″W
- Country: France
- Region: Pays de la Loire
- Department: Mayenne
- Arrondissement: Château-Gontier
- Canton: Cossé-le-Vivien

Government
  - Mayor (2020–2026): Gaétan Chadelaud
- Area^{1}: 8.76 km^{2} (3.38 sq mi)
- Elevation: 79 m (259 ft)
- Highest elevation: 101 m (331 ft)
- Lowest elevation: 52 m (171 ft)
- Population (2023): 248
  - Density: 28.3/km^{2} (73.3/sq mi)
- Time zone: UTC+01:00 (CET)
  - Summer (DST): UTC+02:00 (CEST)
- INSEE/Postal code: 53191 /53350
- ^{1} French Land Register data, which excludes lakes, ponds, glaciers > 1 km^{2} (0.386 sq mi or 247 acres) and river estuaries.

La Roë (French pronunciation: [la ʁo]) is a commune in the Mayenne department in north-western France.

== History ==
The Bretonic ascetic preacher Robert of Arbrissel founded a community of canons regular in 1092 which was confirmed by Pope Urban II in Angers in February 1092. This would in time turn into the development of La Roë Abbey.

== See also ==
- Communes of Mayenne
