= Louis de Vaucelles de Ravigny =

French egyptologist (1798–1851)

- Born: Alexandre-Louis-Henri de Vaucelles de Ravigny; November 14, 1798; Argentan, France
- Died: August 12, 1851 (aged 52); Paris, France
- Occupations: Egyptologist, politician
- Known for: Egyptian studies; Deputy of Mayenne

Louis de Vaucelles de Ravigny (full name Alexandre-Louis-Henri de Vaucelles de Ravigny; Argentan, 14 November 1798 – Paris, 12 August 1851) was a French Egyptologist, traveler, orientalist, and politician. He is recognized as one of the pioneers of Egyptology in Nubia, due to his work on ancient monuments and his interpretations of hieroglyphs, carried out even before the publication of Jean-François Champollion’s research on the subject.

== Biography ==
=== Origins ===
He was the son of Emmanuel-Alexandre de Vaucelles, lord of Ravigny, mayor of Champfrémont, and Henriette Le Forestier de La Durandière. He was an Egyptologist and a landowner at La Poôté (Saint-Pierre-des-Nids). The Vaucelles family originated in Poitou, and its titles form a substantial archival collection in the Departmental Archives of Vienne... From the 17th century onward, the Vaucelles family resided on the estate of La Bellière. Their coat of arms was: silver with a red chief charged with seven gold billets, four above three. His brother, Alexandre François Jules de Vaucelles de Ravigny, was a general councillor for the canton of Briouze and mayor of Lignou. Married to Adrienne Antoinette du Meilet, his son Paul Mohamed de Vaucelles de Ravigny (1836–1890), married to Marie Eugénie de Boffé, general councillor for the canton of Pré-en-Pail.

=== Education and influences ===
Historian Michel Denis describes Louis de Vaucelles as a landowner in the full sense of the term, having lived entirely off his landed income. He trained early in the Decipherment of ancient Egyptian scripts. As early as 1824, he adopted the methods of Jean-François Champollion and prepared for a journey to Egypt, motivated by interests in ornithology and archaeology. In 1833, he published a translation from Arabic of the Ajroumiyyah by Mohammed ben Daoud, but it was especially his Chronology of the Ancient Monuments of Nubia (1829) that left a mark in the history of Egyptology. Louis de Vaucelles traveled widely to Piedmont in 1820, to Scotland and England in 1821, to Rome and Sicily in 1823. It appears that Champollion initially offered to take Louis de Vaucelles with him on his own expedition.

=== Journey to Egypt and Nubia (1826) ===
With a mind open to all sciences, he learned Arabic within a few months and acquired, at Champollion’s school, sufficient knowledge of Egyptian hieroglyphs to undertake a journey to Egypt. In 1826, Louis de Vaucelles embarked on a year-long journey in Egypt and Nubia. He left Marseille on 27 January 1826 and arrived the following day in Alexandria, where he remained until mid-March before proceeding to Cairo. He traveled up the Nile as far as Wadi Halfa, south of the first cataract, and then descended the river, exploring both banks. He visited the principal archaeological sites: Alexandria, Cairo, Karnak, Luxor, Dendera, Abydos, Philae, Aswan, and many others. He examined all the major temples, carefully collecting the cartouches of the individuals who had built, enlarged, or restored them. He recorded and interpreted inscriptions from temples, tombs, and palaces using Champollion’s methods. His travel journal and records made it possible to correct earlier theories on the dating of Nubian monuments, particularly those of Franz Christian Gau, who had dated them before those of Memphis and Thebes. From this journey, he published: a travel journal (1826), and in 1829, a Chronology of the Ancient Monuments of Nubia, in which he was the first to identify most of the Pharaoh, Ptolemies, and Roman emperors responsible for building or enlarging these monuments. He wrote in this work:

During a journey that I undertook in Nubia in 1826, in order to study the antiquities of this interesting country, I realized that only the reading of the hieroglyphic legends of kings could provide the means of determining the age of its temples. The discoveries of Champollion the Younger had just been published. Taking advantage of the knowledge they provided, I carefully recorded all the cartouches of the princes who had built, repaired, or enlarged these monuments. Chronologie des monuments antiques de la Nubie, p. 8

=== Contributions to Egyptology ===
Louis de Vaucelles was the first to correctly identify the names of pharaohs on Nubian monuments, even before Champollion published his own interpretations. His Chronology of the Ancient Monuments of Nubia (1829) is considered a foundational work, although it contained some errors in dynastic succession, due to the limited knowledge available at the time. He has been described as a pioneer of Egyptology by scholars such as Warren Royal Dawson. Jean‑François Champollion mentioned Louis de Vaucelles de Ravigny in his letters and journals (Lettres et Journaux de Champollion, H. Hartleben, éd., vol. 1, 1902, p. 272), and also wrote about his life and scientific achievements.

=== Politics ===
Politically, he strongly supported the regime of the July Monarchy. One of his neighbors, who remained a legitimist (Carliste), described him as: an atheistic socialist of alarming eccentricity who proposed taxing all priests. Louis de Vaucelles de Ravigny was elected deputy for the grand collège of Mayenne in the 1830 legislative elections, replacing Michel du Mans de Bourglevesque. He took the oath to the government of Louis Philippe I, but played only a minor role in parliamentary life. By ordinance dated 7 January 1831, he was appointed to the General Council of Mayenne.

He failed in the 1831 legislative elections in the fourth district of the department (Mayenne extra-muros), losing to Marie‑Théodore de Rumigny. He ran again unsuccessfully in the 1834 elections. Alphonse-Victor Angot notes that Louis Vaucelles—having abandoned his noble particle—issued a political profession of faith in 1834 addressed to voters of the second electoral district of Mayenne. He was elected as a republican in the 1848 cantonal elections in Mayenne. He resided at the Château de la Bellière in Mayenne and at the Château de Lignou in Normandy. As an amateur archaeologist, he took part in excavations at the Jublains archeological site in 1843.

=== Legacy ===
One of his great-grandnephews, Pierre de Vaucelles, served as French ambassador to Iraq and as deputy representative of France to the United Nations. The Vaucelles family preserved archives and objects from his travels, including an offering stela dating from the end of the Fifth Dynasty of Egypt, which remained at the Château de Lignou until the 1980s. His collection was later dispersed by his descendants, including a papyrus written in abnormal Hieratic, now held by the British Museum

=== Works ===
- Chronologie des monuments antiques de la Nubie d'après l'interprétation des légendes royales contenues dans les bas-reliefs hiéroglyphiques, 1829, Paris, Librairie orientale de Dondey-Dupré Père et fils, Chronologie des monuments antiques de la Nubie, d'après l'interprétation des légendes royales contenues dans les bas-reliefs hiéroglyphiques, par M. Louis Vaucelle..., In-8° , 24 p., 4 pl.
- Ibn Adjurrum; Traducteur de la Grammaire arabe de Mohammed-ben-Daoud; publiée à Paris, avec le texte arabe, en 1833, in-8. (Bachelin-Defiorenne, en 1870, no 309, 2 fr. 50.)
- Ibn Adjurrum, L'Adjroumieh, grammaire arabe, de Mohammed-ben-Daoud; publiée en arabe et en français. Paris, 1834, in-8 de 44 pp.

=== Bibliography ===
- Pierre du Bourguet, Un pionnier méconnu de l’égyptologie le Comte Louis de Vaucelles (1798-1853), Bulletin de la Société française d’égyptologie Année 1958 27 pp. 57-63 Un pionnier méconnu de l’égyptologie le Comte Louis de Vaucelles (1798-1853)
- Pierre du Bourguet, Le monument Vaucelles: Une stèle-pancarte de l'Ancien Empire d'un modèle peu commun, Mélanges Maspéro, vol. 66/4, 1961, pp. 11-16, pls. I-IV
