= Saint-Mars-du-Désert =

Saint-Mars-du-Désert may refer to the following places in France:

- Saint-Mars-du-Désert, Loire-Atlantique, a commune in the Loire-Atlantique department
- Saint-Mars-du-Désert, Mayenne, a commune in the Mayenne department
