= Laleu =

Laleu may refer to:

- Laleu, Orne, France
- Laleu, Somme, France
