= Château du Grand Coudray =

Château in Mayenne, France

Coordinates: 48°18′22″N 0°18′43″W

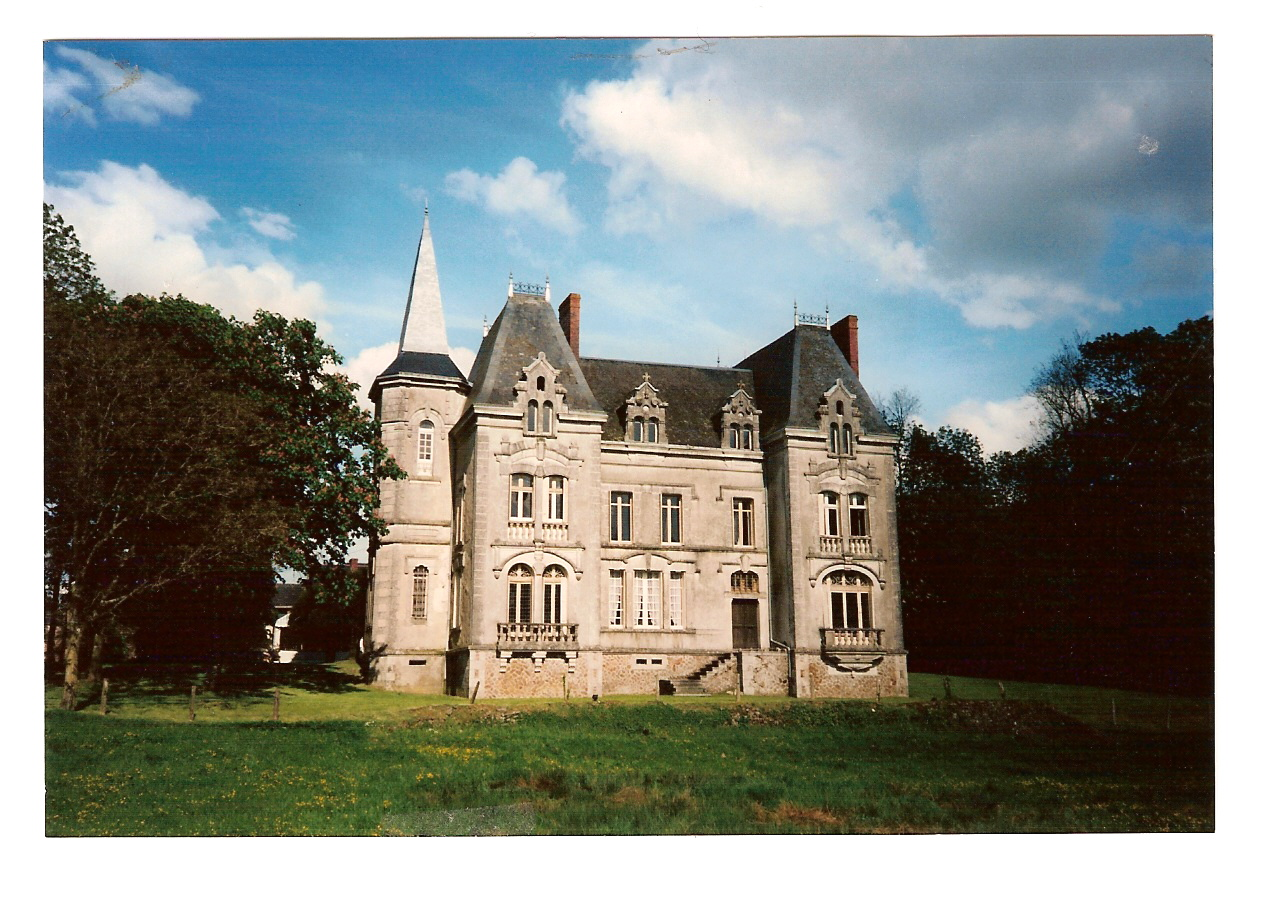
Château du Grand Coudray

The Château du Grand Coudray is a private chateau located about 5 kilometres (3.1 mi) from Villaines-la-Juhel in the Mayenne departement of France.
