= Madré =

- Commune
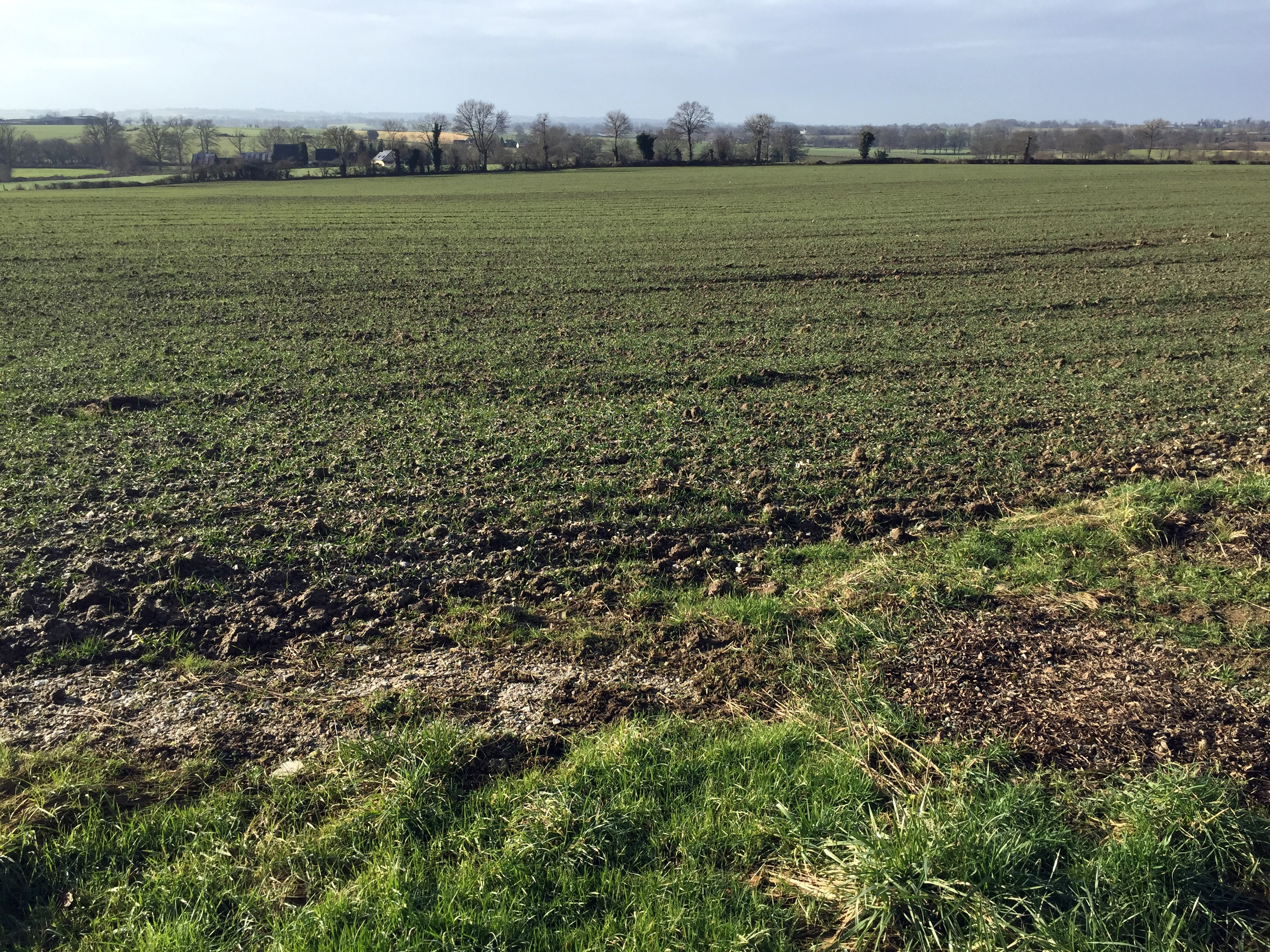
- The winter landscape in Madré
- Location of Madré
- Location within France Location within Pays de la Loire
- Coordinates: 48°28′41″N 0°22′42″W
- Country: France
- Region: Pays de la Loire
- Department: Mayenne
- Arrondissement: Mayenne
- Canton: Villaines-la-Juhel

Government
  - Mayor (2020–2026): Bernard Blanchard
- Area^{1}: 17.55 km^{2} (6.78 sq mi)
- Elevation: 150 m (490 ft)
- Highest elevation: 189 m (620 ft)
- Lowest elevation: 122 m (400 ft)
- Population (2023): 280
  - Density: 16/km^{2} (41/sq mi)
- Time zone: UTC+01:00 (CET)
  - Summer (DST): UTC+02:00 (CEST)
- INSEE/Postal code: 53142 /53250
- ^{1} French Land Register data, which excludes lakes, ponds, glaciers > 1 km^{2} (0.386 sq mi or 247 acres) and river estuaries.

Madré (French pronunciation: [madʁe]) is a commune in the department of Mayenne in north-western France.

The maternal great-grandfather of Saint Thérèse de Lisieux, Louis Macé, was baptised in the village church on 16 March 1778.

== Geography ==
The commune is made up of the following collection of villages and hamlets, Madré, Cochereau, Mont Mer, La Gasnerie, Le Chemin and La Tonnazière.

The river Mayenne flows through the commune.

== Notable people ==
- Jean-Jacques Reboux - (1958 – 2021) a writer, poet, and editor, who was born here.

== See also ==
- Communes of the Mayenne department
