= Alpes Mancelles =

Alpes Mancelles is a Natura 2000 conservation area that is 1,190 hectares in size.

== Geography ==
The area has numerous rock outcrops, cliffs and Scree while the bottom of the valley has Riparian forests and wet meadows.

It is spread across 5 different communes all within three departments the Orne, Sarthe and Mayenne;

1. Gesvres
2. Moulins-le-Carbonnel
3. Saint-Céneri-le-Gérei
4. Saint-Léonard-des-Bois
5. Saint-Pierre-des-Nids

This protected site is within the Normandie-Maine Regional Natural Park.

== Conservation ==
The conservation area has seven species listed in Annex 2 of the Habitats Directive;

1. European bullhead
2. Cottus perifretum
3. Brook lamprey
4. European bitterling
5. White-clawed crayfish
6. European stag beetle
7. Orange-spotted emerald

In addition the Natura 2000 site has twenty habitats protected under the Habitats Directive.
