= Boulay-les-Ifs =

- Commune
- Coat of arms
- Location of Boulay-les-Ifs
- Location within France Location within Pays de la Loire
- Coordinates: 48°25′16″N 0°07′53″W
- Country: France
- Region: Pays de la Loire
- Department: Mayenne
- Arrondissement: Mayenne
- Canton: Villaines-la-Juhel

Government
  - Mayor (2020–2026): Yves Legay
- Area^{1}: 9.05 km^{2} (3.49 sq mi)
- Elevation: 210 m (690 ft)
- Highest elevation: 393 m (1,289 ft)
- Lowest elevation: 190 m (620 ft)
- Population (2023): 136
  - Density: 15.0/km^{2} (38.9/sq mi)
- Time zone: UTC+01:00 (CET)
  - Summer (DST): UTC+02:00 (CEST)
- INSEE/Postal code: 53038 /53370
- ^{1} French Land Register data, which excludes lakes, ponds, glaciers > 1 km^{2} (0.386 sq mi or 247 acres) and river estuaries.

Boulay-les-Ifs (French pronunciation: [bulɛ le.z‿if]) is a commune in the Mayenne department in northwestern France.

== Geography ==
The commune is made up of the following collection of villages and hamlets, La Garenne, Courgalin, Boulay-les-Ifs and La Galasière.

The commune is in the Normandie-Maine Regional Natural Park.

== Population ==
Historical population
Year	Pop.	±% p.a.
1968	177	—
1975	160	−1.43%
1982	160	+0.00%
1990	131	−2.47%
1999	168	+2.80%
2007	163	−0.38%
2012	167	+0.49%
2017	156	−1.35%
2023	136	−2.26%
Source: INSEE

== See also ==
- Communes of Mayenne
- Parc naturel régional Normandie-Maine
