= Canton of Villaines-la-Juhel =

Coordinates: 48.35°N 0.28°W

The canton of Villaines-la-Juhel is an administrative division of the Mayenne department, northwestern France. Its borders were modified at the French canton reorganisation which came into effect in March 2015. Its seat is in Villaines-la-Juhel.

It consists of the following communes:

1. Averton
2. Boulay-les-Ifs
3. Champfrémont
4. Chevaigné-du-Maine
5. Couptrain
6. Courcité
7. Crennes-sur-Fraubée
8. Gesvres
9. Le Ham
10. Javron-les-Chapelles
11. Lignières-Orgères
12. Loupfougères
13. Madré
14. Neuilly-le-Vendin
15. La Pallu
16. Pré-en-Pail-Saint-Samson
17. Ravigny
18. Saint-Aignan-de-Couptrain
19. Saint-Aubin-du-Désert
20. Saint-Calais-du-Désert
21. Saint-Cyr-en-Pail
22. Saint-Germain-de-Coulamer
23. Saint-Mars-du-Désert
24. Saint-Pierre-des-Nids
25. Villaines-la-Juhel
26. Villepail
