= Gesvres =

- Commune
- Coat of arms
- Location of Gesvres
- Location within France Location within Pays de la Loire
- Coordinates: 48°22′11″N 0°08′43″W
- Country: France
- Region: Pays de la Loire
- Department: Mayenne
- Arrondissement: Mayenne
- Canton: Villaines-la-Juhel

Government
  - Mayor (2020–2026): Denis Duvallet
- Area^{1}: 21.78 km^{2} (8.41 sq mi)
- Elevation: 196 m (643 ft)
- Highest elevation: 301 m (988 ft)
- Lowest elevation: 145 m (476 ft)
- Population (2023): 539
  - Density: 24.7/km^{2} (64.1/sq mi)
- Time zone: UTC+01:00 (CET)
  - Summer (DST): UTC+02:00 (CEST)
- INSEE/Postal code: 53106 /53370
- ^{1} French Land Register data, which excludes lakes, ponds, glaciers > 1 km^{2} (0.386 sq mi or 247 acres) and river estuaries.

Gesvres (French pronunciation: [ʒɛvʁ]) is a commune in the Mayenne department located in the Pays de la Loire region in north-western France. According to dat.gouv.fr website, the INSEE code for Gesvres is 53106, the postal code is 53370. The population of Gesvres was 509 in 2019.

== Geography ==
The commune is made up of the following collection of villages and hamlets, La Sauvagère du Bas, Hautecourt, Les Champs Elysées, Les Anellières, Gesvres and Le Plessis.

The commune is in the Normandie-Maine Regional Natural Park.

The Commune along with another 4 communes shares part of a 1,190 hectare, Natura 2000 conservation area, called the Alpes Mancelles.

== See also ==
- Communes of the Mayenne department
- Parc naturel régional Normandie-Maine
