= Saint-Léonard-des-Bois =

- Commune
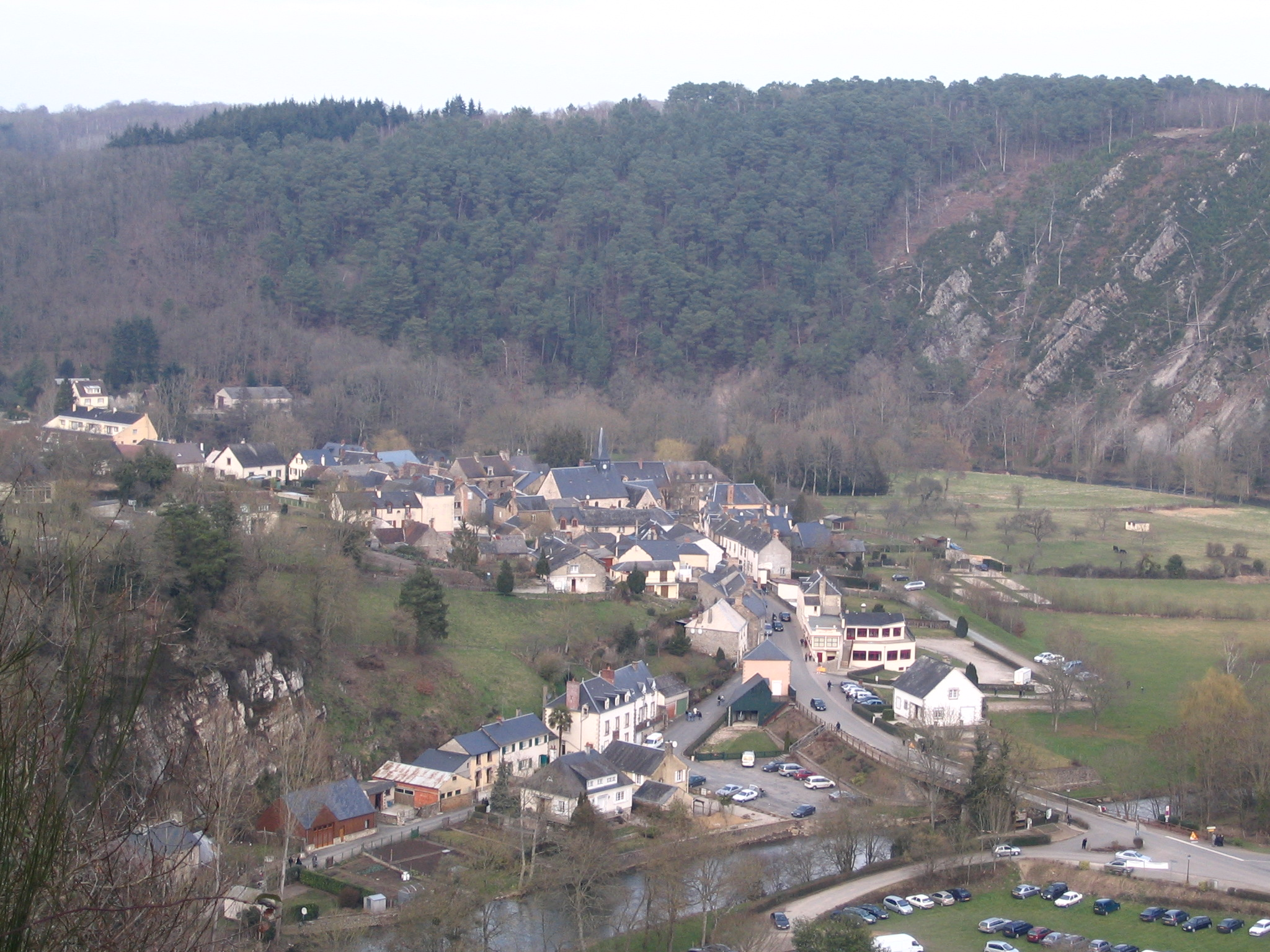
- The centre of Saint-Léonard-des-Bois

- Coat of arms
- Location of Saint-Léonard-des-Bois
- Location within France Location within Pays de la Loire
- Coordinates: 48°21′08″N 0°04′36″W
- Country: France
- Region: Pays de la Loire
- Department: Sarthe
- Arrondissement: Mamers
- Canton: Sillé-le-Guillaume
- Intercommunality: Haute Sarthe Alpes Mancelles

Government
  - Mayor (2020–2026): Pascal Delpierre
- Area^{1}: 27.12 km^{2} (10.47 sq mi)
- Highest elevation: 241 m (791 ft)
- Lowest elevation: 87 m (285 ft)
- Population (2023): 471
  - Density: 17.4/km^{2} (45.0/sq mi)
- Demonym: Saint-Léonardais
- Time zone: UTC+01:00 (CET)
  - Summer (DST): UTC+02:00 (CEST)
- INSEE/Postal code: 72294 /72130
- Website: www.saint-leonard-des-bois.net
- ^{1} French Land Register data, which excludes lakes, ponds, glaciers > 1 km^{2} (0.386 sq mi or 247 acres) and river estuaries.

Saint-Léonard-des-Bois (French pronunciation: [sɛ̃ leɔnaʁ de bwa]) is a commune in the Sarthe department in the region of Pays de la Loire in north-western France.

== Geography ==
The Commune along with another 4 communes shares part of a 1,190 hectare, Natura 2000 conservation area, called the Alpes Mancelles.

The Sarthon river flows through the commune.

The commune is in the Normandie-Maine Regional Natural Park.

== See also ==
- Communes of the Sarthe department
- Parc naturel régional Normandie-Maine
