= Crennes-sur-Fraubée =

- Commune
- Location of Crennes-sur-Fraubée
- Location within France Location within Pays de la Loire
- Coordinates: 48°22′45″N 0°16′39″W
- Country: France
- Region: Pays de la Loire
- Department: Mayenne
- Arrondissement: Mayenne
- Canton: Villaines-la-Juhel

Government
  - Mayor (2020–2026): Loïc De Poix
- Area^{1}: 12.77 km^{2} (4.93 sq mi)
- Elevation: 300 m (980 ft)
- Highest elevation: 372 m (1,220 ft)
- Lowest elevation: 179 m (587 ft)
- Population (2023): 192
  - Density: 15.0/km^{2} (38.9/sq mi)
- Time zone: UTC+01:00 (CET)
  - Summer (DST): UTC+02:00 (CEST)
- INSEE/Postal code: 53085 /53700
- ^{1} French Land Register data, which excludes lakes, ponds, glaciers > 1 km^{2} (0.386 sq mi or 247 acres) and river estuaries.

Crennes-sur-Fraubée (French pronunciation: [kʁɛn syʁ fʁobe]) is a commune in the Mayenne department in north-western France.

== Geography ==
The commune is made up of the following collection of villages and hamlets, Chon, Crennes-sur-Fraubée and Le Bois Gervais.

== See also ==
- Communes of the Mayenne department
