= Moulins-le-Carbonnel =

- Commune
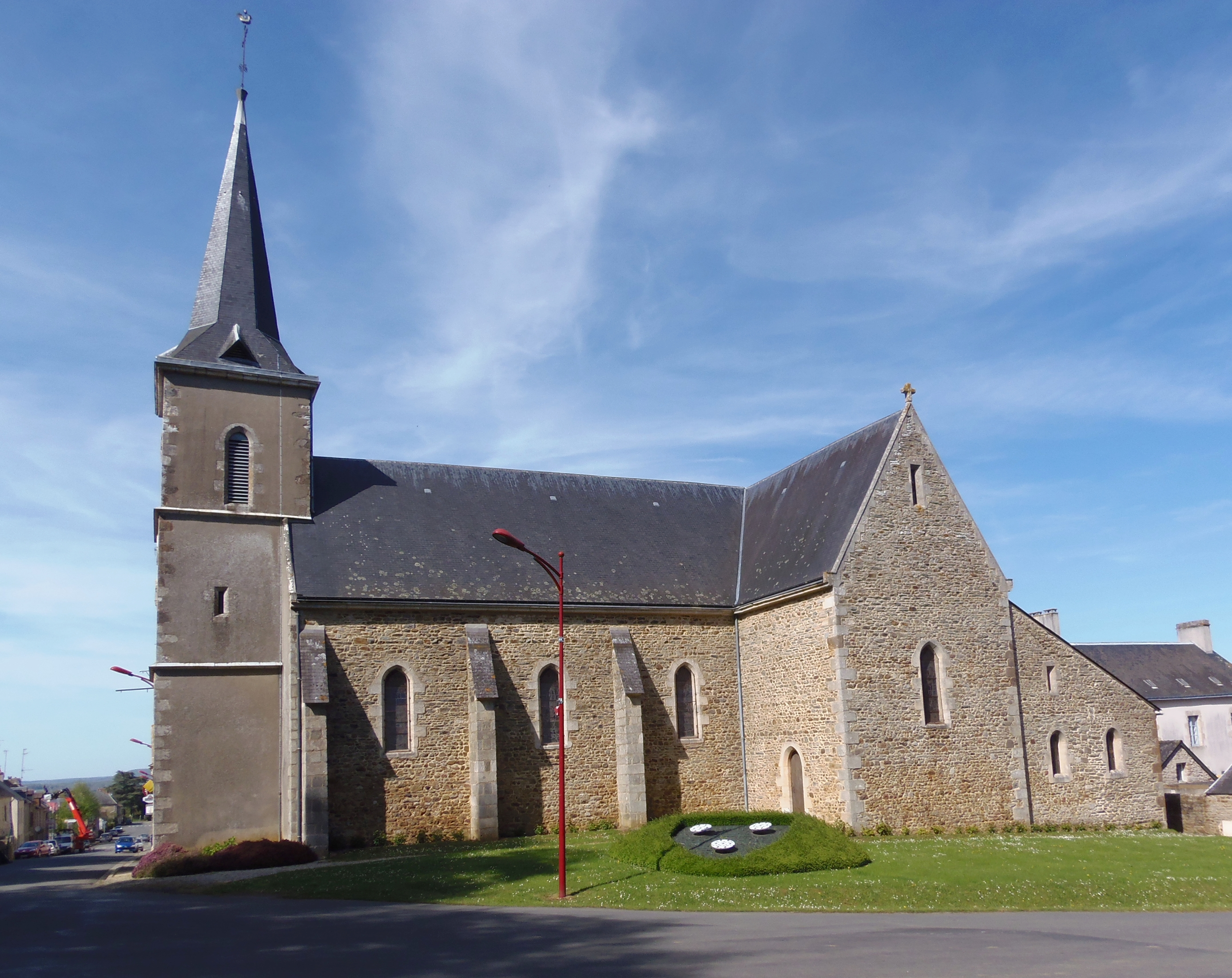
- The church of Saint-Symphorien, in Moulins-le-Carbonnel

- Coat of arms
- Location of Moulins-le-Carbonnel
- Location within France Location within Pays de la Loire
- Coordinates: 48°22′24″N 0°01′23″W
- Country: France
- Region: Pays de la Loire
- Department: Sarthe
- Arrondissement: Mamers
- Canton: Sillé-le-Guillaume
- Intercommunality: Haute Sarthe Alpes Mancelles

Government
  - Mayor (2020–2026): Stéphanie Bouquet
- Area^{1}: 16.31 km^{2} (6.30 sq mi)
- Highest elevation: 223 m (732 ft)
- Lowest elevation: 118 m (387 ft)
- Population (2023): 697
  - Density: 42.7/km^{2} (111/sq mi)
- Demonym: Moulinois
- Time zone: UTC+01:00 (CET)
  - Summer (DST): UTC+02:00 (CEST)
- INSEE/Postal code: 72212 /72130
- ^{1} French Land Register data, which excludes lakes, ponds, glaciers > 1 km^{2} (0.386 sq mi or 247 acres) and river estuaries.

Moulins-le-Carbonnel is a commune in the Sarthe department in the region of Pays de la Loire in north-western France.

== Geography ==
The commune is made up of the following collection of villages and hamlets, Le Grand Mesnil, L'Ancellière and Moulins-le-Carbonnel.

The commune is in the Normandie-Maine Regional Natural Park.

The commune along with another 32 communes is part of a 3,503 hectare, Natura 2000 conservation area, called the Haute vallée de la Sarthe.

In addition the Commune along with another 4 communes shares part of a 1,190 hectare, Natura 2000 conservation area, called the Alpes Mancelles.

== See also ==
- Communes of the Sarthe department
- Parc naturel régional Normandie-Maine
