= Marcelle Neveu =

French middle-distance runner

Marcelle Marie Georgette Neveu
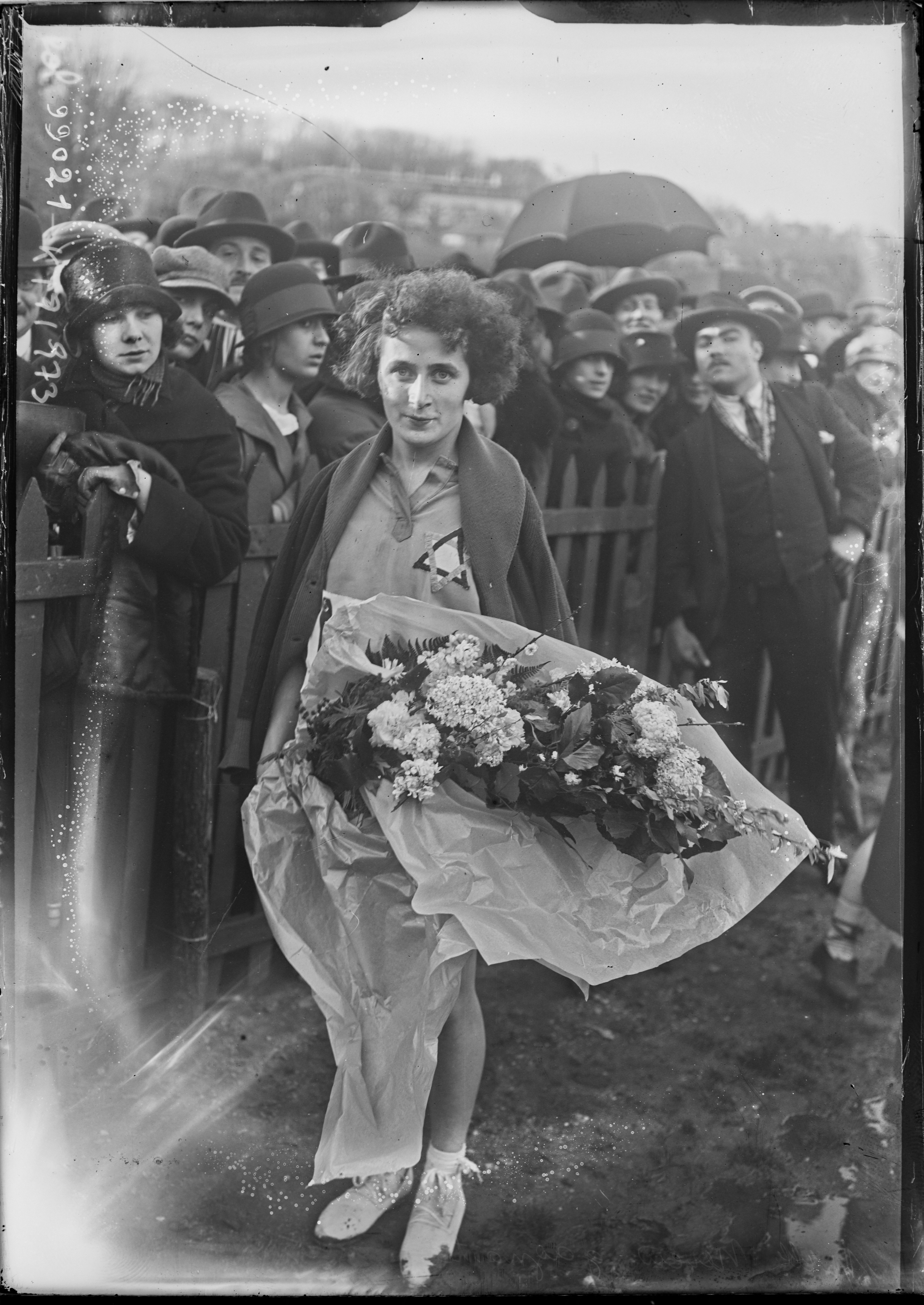
- Marcelle Neveu, winner of a cross-country race in Saint-Cloud in 1925.

Personal information
- Nationality: French
- Born: 2 November 1906 Ravigny, France
- Died: 3 June 1993 (aged 86) Saint-Junien, France

Sport
- Sport: Middle-distance running
- Event: 800 metres

Marcelle Neveu (2 November 1906 – 3 June 1993) was a French middle-distance runner. She competed in the women's 800 metres at the 1928 Summer Olympics.
