= Courcité =

- Commune
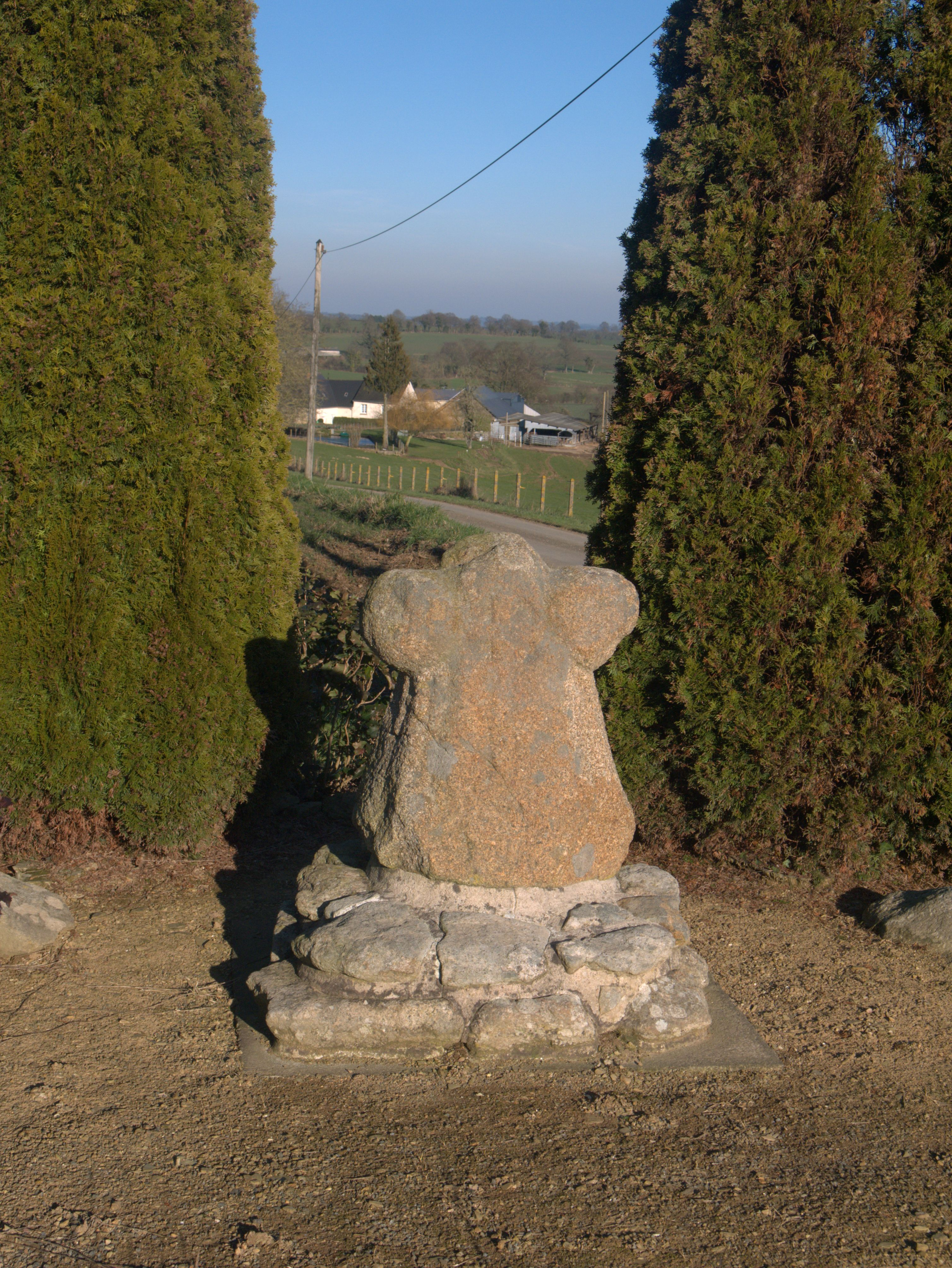
- The calvary in Courcité
- Location of Courcité
- Location within France Location within Pays de la Loire
- Coordinates: 48°18′24″N 0°14′54″W
- Country: France
- Region: Pays de la Loire
- Department: Mayenne
- Arrondissement: Mayenne
- Canton: Villaines-la-Juhel

Government
  - Mayor (2020–2026): Yves Dauverchain
- Area^{1}: 30.69 km^{2} (11.85 sq mi)
- Elevation: 182 m (597 ft)
- Highest elevation: 269 m (883 ft)
- Lowest elevation: 153 m (502 ft)
- Population (2023): 797
  - Density: 26.0/km^{2} (67.3/sq mi)
- Time zone: UTC+01:00 (CET)
  - Summer (DST): UTC+02:00 (CEST)
- INSEE/Postal code: 53083 /53700
- ^{1} French Land Register data, which excludes lakes, ponds, glaciers > 1 km^{2} (0.386 sq mi or 247 acres) and river estuaries.

Courcité (French pronunciation: [kuʁsite]) is a commune in the Mayenne department in north-western France.

== See also ==
- Communes of the Mayenne department
