= Saint-Calais-du-Désert =

- Commune
- Coat of arms
- Location of Saint-Calais-du-Désert
- Location within France Location within Pays de la Loire
- Coordinates: 48°29′09″N 0°15′37″W
- Country: France
- Region: Pays de la Loire
- Department: Mayenne
- Arrondissement: Mayenne
- Canton: Villaines-la-Juhel
- Intercommunality: CC du Mont des Avaloirs

Government
  - Mayor (2020–2026): Henri Guilmeau
- Area^{1}: 17.2 km^{2} (6.6 sq mi)
- Elevation: 239 m (784 ft)
- Highest elevation: 288 m (945 ft)
- Lowest elevation: 153 m (502 ft)
- Population (2023): 396
  - Density: 23.0/km^{2} (59.6/sq mi)
- Time zone: UTC+01:00 (CET)
  - Summer (DST): UTC+02:00 (CEST)
- INSEE/Postal code: 53204 /53140
- ^{1} French Land Register data, which excludes lakes, ponds, glaciers > 1 km^{2} (0.386 sq mi or 247 acres) and river estuaries.

Saint-Calais-du-Désert (French pronunciation: [sɛ̃ kalɛ dy dezɛʁ]) is a commune in the Mayenne department in north-western France.

== Geography ==
The commune is made up of the following collection of villages and hamlets, La Huttière, Le Fresne, La Blandinière, L'Angottière, L'Hardonnière, Saint-Calais-du-Désert and Le Fay.

The commune is located within the Normandie-Maine Regional Natural Park.

The river Mayenne flows through the commune.

== See also ==
- Communes of Mayenne
- Parc naturel régional Normandie-Maine
