= Saint-Cyr-en-Pail =

- Commune
- Coat of arms
- Location of Saint-Cyr-en-Pail
- Location within France Location within Pays de la Loire
- Coordinates: 48°26′30″N 0°14′35″W
- Country: France
- Region: Pays de la Loire
- Department: Mayenne
- Arrondissement: Mayenne
- Canton: Villaines-la-Juhel
- Intercommunality: CC du Mont des Avaloirs

Government
  - Mayor (2020–2026): Jean-Luc Lecourt
- Area^{1}: 20.65 km^{2} (7.97 sq mi)
- Elevation: 294 m (965 ft)
- Highest elevation: 376 m (1,234 ft)
- Lowest elevation: 179 m (587 ft)
- Population (2023): 500
  - Density: 24/km^{2} (63/sq mi)
- Time zone: UTC+01:00 (CET)
  - Summer (DST): UTC+02:00 (CEST)
- INSEE/Postal code: 53208 /53140
- ^{1} French Land Register data, which excludes lakes, ponds, glaciers > 1 km^{2} (0.386 sq mi or 247 acres) and river estuaries.

Saint-Cyr-en-Pail (French pronunciation: [sɛ̃ siʁ ɑ̃ paj]) is a commune in the Mayenne department in north-western France.

== Geography ==
The commune is made up of the following collection of villages and hamlets, La Mercerie, Saint-Cyr-en-Pail, Le But, Le Bois-Guyard and L'Etravy.

The commune is located within the Normandie-Maine Regional Natural Park.

== See also ==
- Communes of Mayenne
- Parc naturel régional Normandie-Maine
