= Couptrain =

- Commune
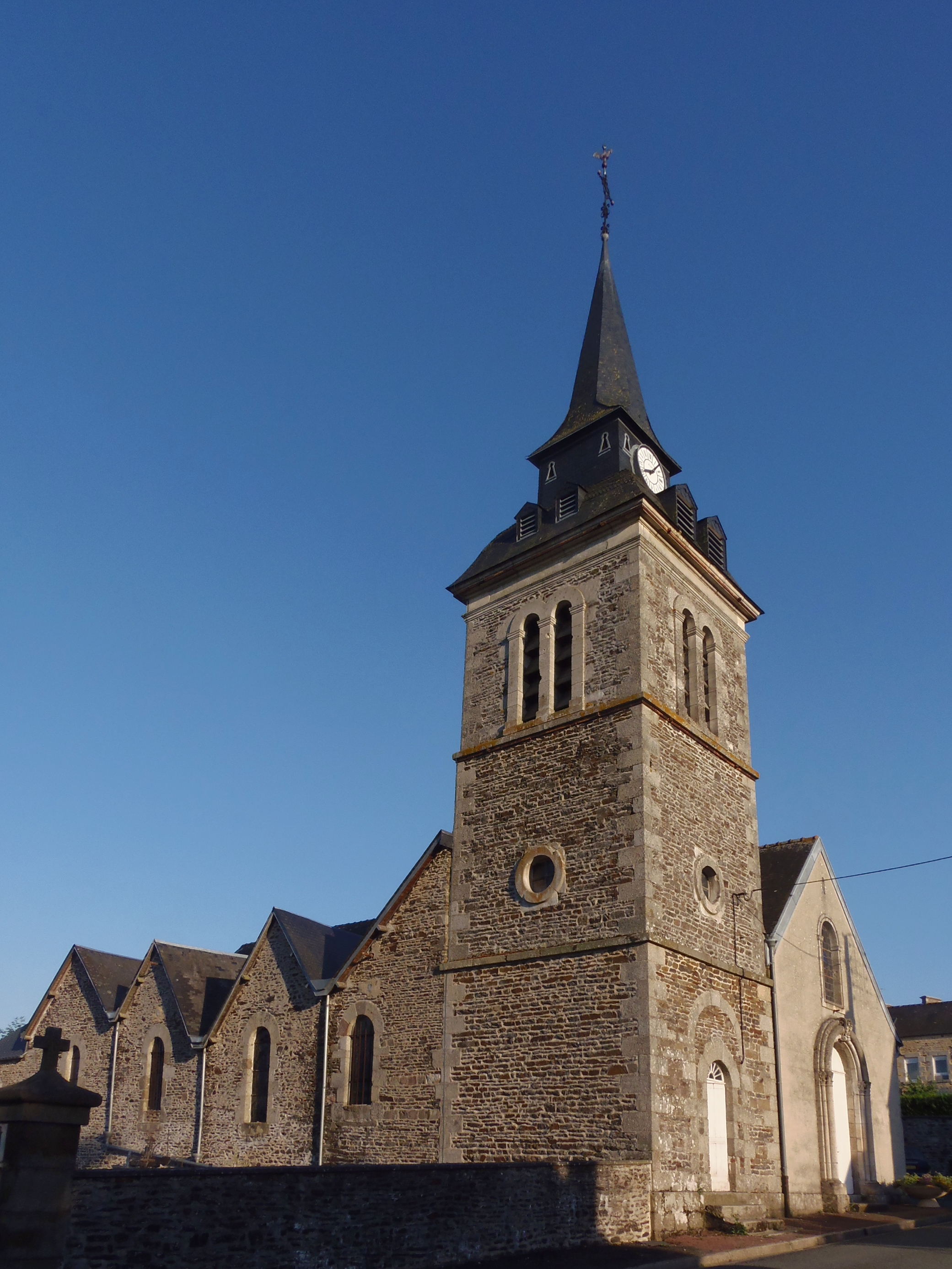
- The church of Our Lady of the Assumption, in Couptrain

- Coat of arms
- Location of Couptrain
- Location within France Location within Pays de la Loire
- Coordinates: 48°29′03″N 0°17′32″W
- Country: France
- Region: Pays de la Loire
- Department: Mayenne
- Arrondissement: Mayenne
- Canton: Villaines-la-Juhel

Government
  - Mayor (2020–2026): Pascal François
- Area^{1}: 0.71 km^{2} (0.27 sq mi)
- Elevation: 165 m (541 ft)
- Highest elevation: 194 m (636 ft)
- Lowest elevation: 153 m (502 ft)
- Population (2023): 103
  - Density: 150/km^{2} (380/sq mi)
- Time zone: UTC+01:00 (CET)
  - Summer (DST): UTC+02:00 (CEST)
- INSEE/Postal code: 53080 /53250
- ^{1} French Land Register data, which excludes lakes, ponds, glaciers > 1 km^{2} (0.386 sq mi or 247 acres) and river estuaries.

Couptrain is a commune in the Mayenne department in north-western France.

== Geography ==
The commune is located within the Normandie-Maine Regional Natural Park.

The river Mayenne flows through the commune.

== See also ==
- Communes of the Mayenne department
- Parc naturel régional Normandie-Maine
