= Villepail =

- Commune
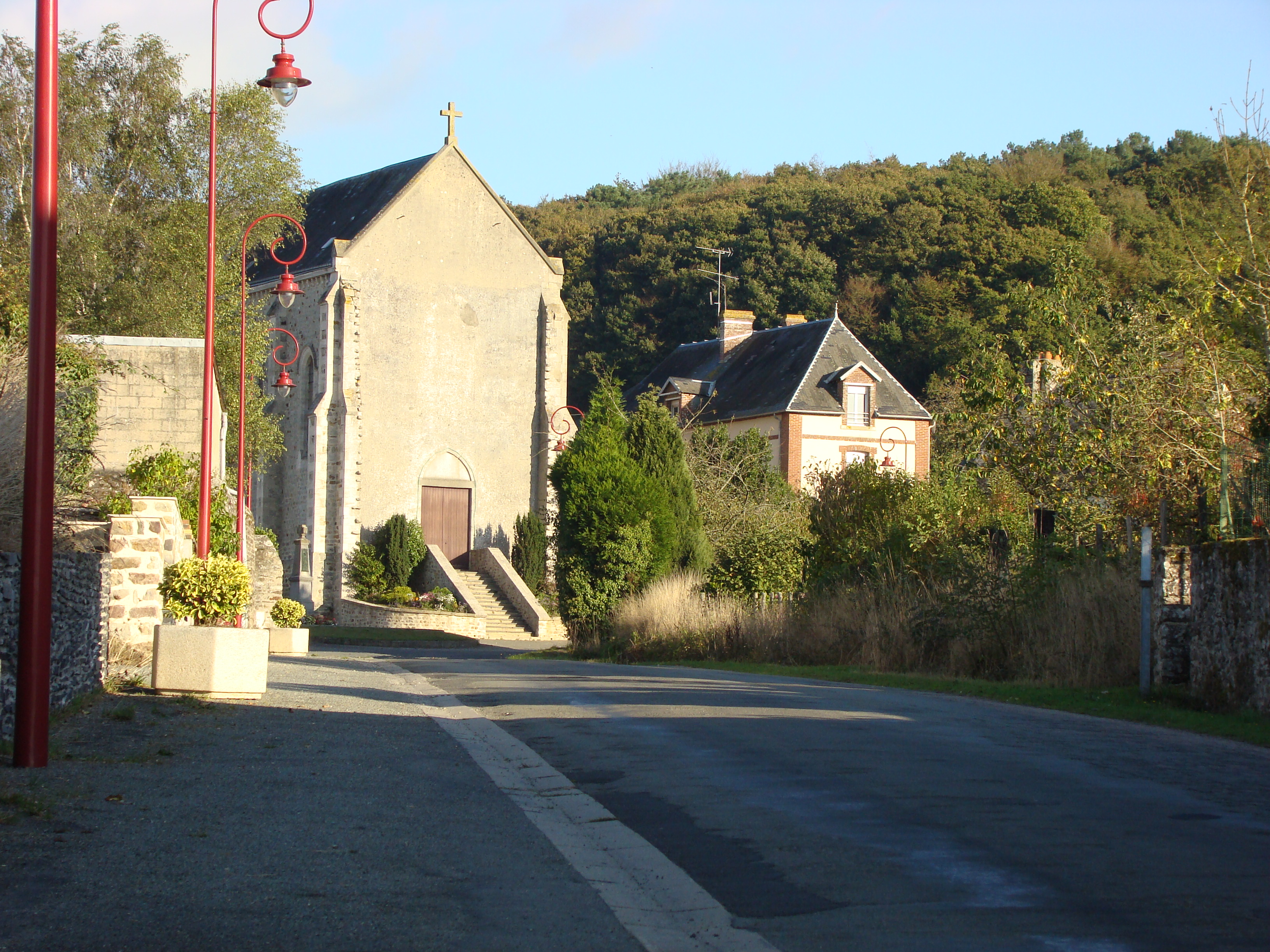
- The church of Saint-Sulpice, in Villepail
- Location of Villepail
- Location within France Location within Pays de la Loire
- Coordinates: 48°23′49″N 0°15′57″W
- Country: France
- Region: Pays de la Loire
- Department: Mayenne
- Arrondissement: Mayenne
- Canton: Villaines-la-Juhel

Government
  - Mayor (2020–2026): Alain Blottière
- Area^{1}: 15.70 km^{2} (6.06 sq mi)
- Elevation: 240 m (790 ft)
- Highest elevation: 383 m (1,257 ft)
- Lowest elevation: 168 m (551 ft)
- Population (2023): 192
  - Density: 12.2/km^{2} (31.7/sq mi)
- Time zone: UTC+01:00 (CET)
  - Summer (DST): UTC+02:00 (CEST)
- INSEE/Postal code: 53272 /53250
- ^{1} French Land Register data, which excludes lakes, ponds, glaciers > 1 km^{2} (0.386 sq mi or 247 acres) and river estuaries.

Villepail (French pronunciation: [vilpaj]) is a commune in the Mayenne department in north-western France.

== Geography ==
The commune is made up of the following collection of villages and hamlets, La Monnerie, Cohélie, Le Petit Augre and Villepail.

The commune is located within the Normandie-Maine Regional Natural Park.

== Points of Interest ==
- La Corniche de Pail - is a natural area that stretches along an 8 km long sandstone Corniche that eventually rises to 383 metres. Located in the extension of the Mont des Avaloirs, it is an important migratory area for birds.
- Tourbière des Egoutelles - is a heath and peat bog nature reserve that is just over one hectare in size. The site is a former Armorican sandstone quarry and is now colonized by peatland flora and fauna.

== See also ==
- Communes of the Mayenne department
- Parc naturel régional Normandie-Maine
