= Chevaigné-du-Maine =

- Commune
- Coat of arms
- Location of Chevaigné-du-Maine
- Location within France Location within Pays de la Loire
- Coordinates: 48°26′16″N 0°23′11″W
- Country: France
- Region: Pays de la Loire
- Department: Mayenne
- Arrondissement: Mayenne
- Canton: Villaines-la-Juhel

Government
  - Mayor (2020–2026): Claude Roulland
- Area^{1}: 13.05 km^{2} (5.04 sq mi)
- Elevation: 200 m (660 ft)
- Highest elevation: 227 m (745 ft)
- Lowest elevation: 137 m (449 ft)
- Population (2023): 150
  - Density: 11/km^{2} (30/sq mi)
- Time zone: UTC+01:00 (CET)
  - Summer (DST): UTC+02:00 (CEST)
- INSEE/Postal code: 53069 /53250
- ^{1} French Land Register data, which excludes lakes, ponds, glaciers > 1 km^{2} (0.386 sq mi or 247 acres) and river estuaries.

Chevaigné-du-Maine is a commune in the Mayenne department in north-western France.

== Geography ==
The commune is made up of the following collection of villages and hamlets, La Chiennerie, La Haie du Tenay, Launay Gondard, La Gastinière, Le Grand Pont, La Vallée, Les Écherets, Chevaigné-du-Maine, La Hadrière, La Gouaudière, L'Angeboudière, La Termerie, Le Mesnillon and La Pillerie.

== See also ==
- Communes of the Mayenne department
