= Coulonges-sur-Sarthe =

- Commune
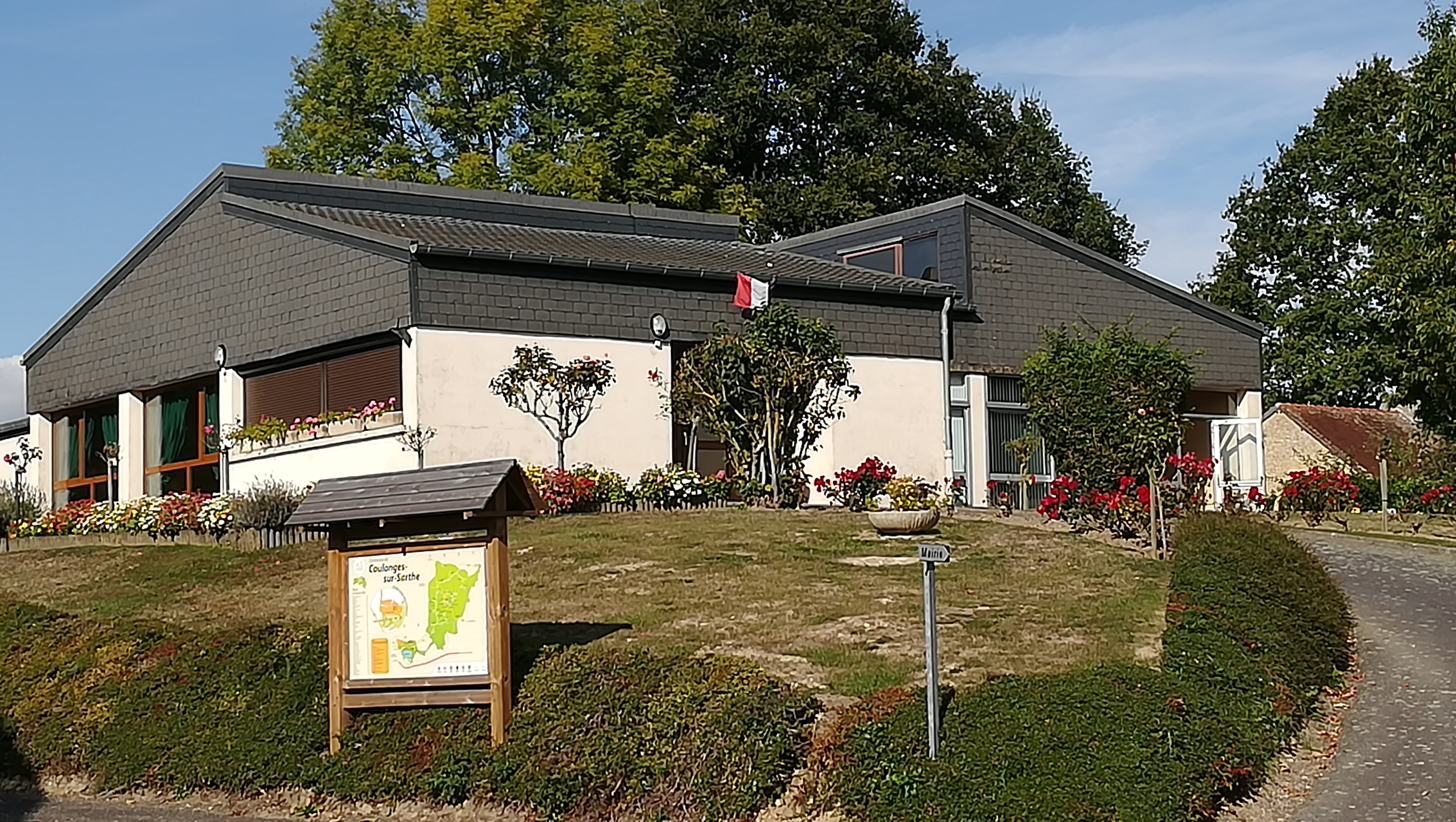
- Location of Coulonges-sur-Sarthe
- Location within France Location within Normandy
- Coordinates: 48°31′57″N 0°24′02″E
- Country: France
- Region: Normandy
- Department: Orne
- Arrondissement: Alençon
- Canton: Écouves
- Intercommunality: Vallée de la Haute Sarthe

Government
  - Mayor (2020–2026): Étienne Guillin
- Area^{1}: 9.65 km^{2} (3.73 sq mi)
- Elevation: 200 m (660 ft)
- Highest elevation: 205 m (673 ft)
- Lowest elevation: 147 m (482 ft)
- Population (2023): 480
  - Density: 50/km^{2} (130/sq mi)
- Demonym: Coulongeois
- Time zone: UTC+01:00 (CET)
  - Summer (DST): UTC+02:00 (CEST)
- INSEE/Postal code: 61126 /61170
- ^{1} French Land Register data, which excludes lakes, ponds, glaciers > 1 km^{2} (0.386 sq mi or 247 acres) and river estuaries.

Coulonges-sur-Sarthe (French pronunciation: [kulɔ̃ʒ syʁ saʁt], literally Coulonges on Sarthe) is a commune in the Orne department in north-western France.

== Geography ==
The commune is made up of the following collection of villages and hamlets, Couillery, Les Petites Hayes, La Dannerie, Les Grandes Hayes, Coulonges-sur-Sarthe, La Tréberdière, Mortruis and Souvelle.

The commune along with another 32 communes is part of a 3,503 hectare, Natura 2000 conservation area, called the Haute vallée de la Sarthe.

The commune is in the Normandie-Maine Regional Natural Park.

The Sarthe river and one it's tributaries flow through the commune.

== Points of Interest ==
- Base de Loisirs is a 16 hectares (0.1 sq mi) lake, that is used for swimming, and features a beach area.
- Ancienne champignonnière des Petites Hayes translated as the Old mushroom Farm of Petit Hayes is a Natura 2000 conservation site measuring 12.77 Hectares. The site is a former Chalk mine, that later became a mushroom farm, which hosts six varieties of bats, listed in Annex 2 of the Habitats Directive, which are the Greater horseshoe bat, Lesser horseshoe bat, Western barbastelle, Geoffroy's bat, Bechstein's bat and the Greater mouse-eared bat.

== See also ==
- Communes of the Orne department
- Parc naturel régional Normandie-Maine
