= Bourg-le-Roi =

- Commune
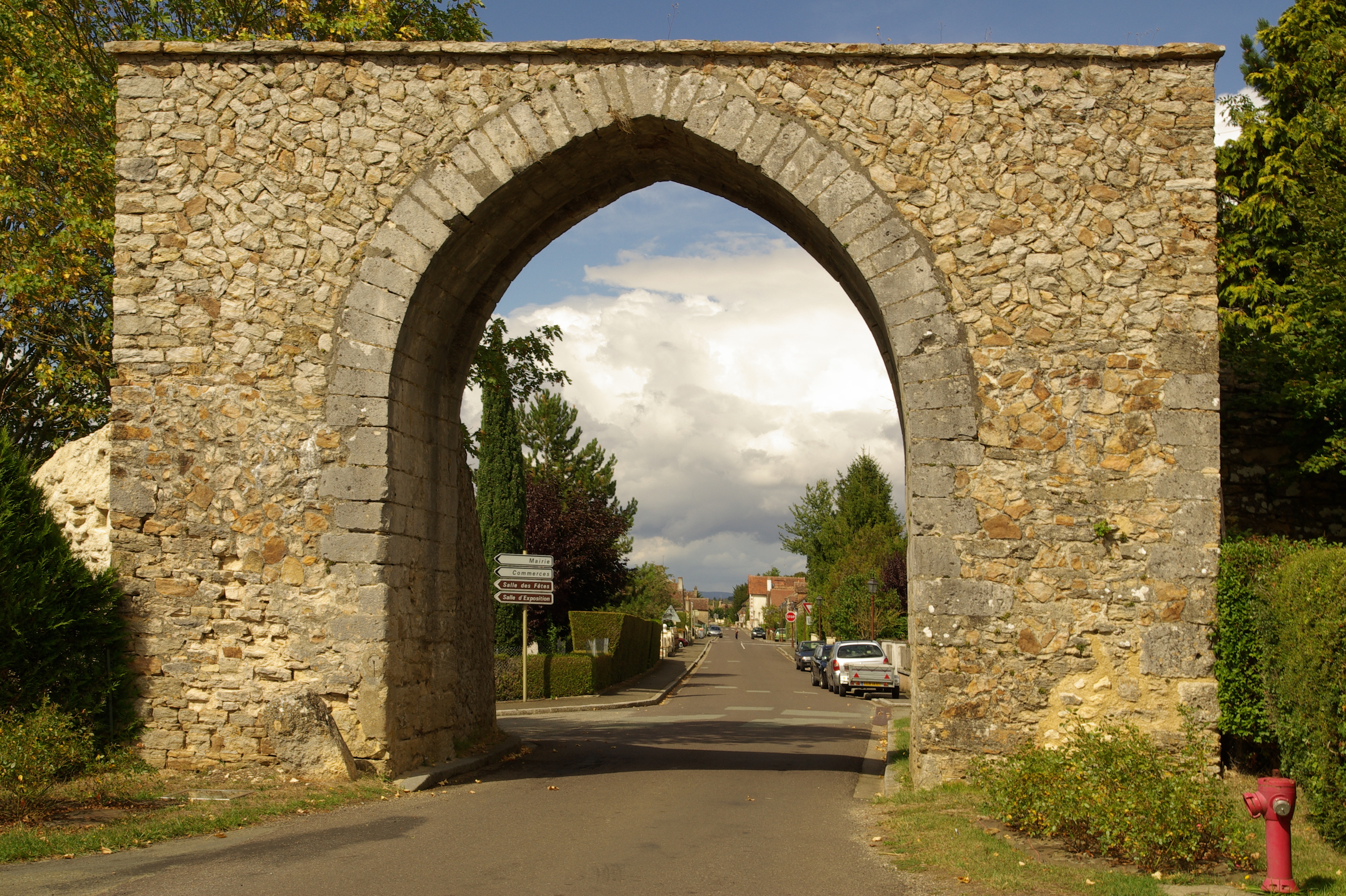
- The Saint Mathurin gate
- Location of Bourg-le-Roi
- Location within France Location within Pays de la Loire
- Coordinates: 48°20′46″N 0°07′55″E
- Country: France
- Region: Pays de la Loire
- Department: Sarthe
- Arrondissement: Mamers
- Canton: Sillé-le-Guillaume
- Intercommunality: Haute Sarthe Alpes Mancelles

Government
  - Mayor (2020–2026): Philippe Martin
- Area^{1}: 0.36 km^{2} (0.14 sq mi)
- Highest elevation: 137 m (449 ft)
- Lowest elevation: 95 m (312 ft)
- Population (2023): 325
  - Density: 900/km^{2} (2,300/sq mi)
- Demonym: Régis-Borgiens
- Time zone: UTC+01:00 (CET)
  - Summer (DST): UTC+02:00 (CEST)
- INSEE/Postal code: 72043 /72610
- ^{1} French Land Register data, which excludes lakes, ponds, glaciers > 1 km^{2} (0.386 sq mi or 247 acres) and river estuaries.

Bourg-le-Roi (French pronunciation: [buʁ lə ʁwa]) is a commune in the Sarthe department in the region of Pays de la Loire in north-western France.

== Geography ==
The le Rosay Nord river runs through the commune.

The commune is in the Normandie-Maine Regional Natural Park.

== Points of Interest ==
- Parc animalier de Bourg-le-Roi is an animal 2 hectare animal park located on the site of the ruins of the castle keep. It was opened in 2022 to the public.

=== Museums ===
- Musee du Point de Beauvais - is a museum dedicated to the Beauvais stitch a type of Embroidery. The museum has been open since 1993, and features a 12 metre fresco embroidered in Beauvais stitch depicting the life of the city from 50 BC to 1450 AD.

=== National Heritage sites ===
- Medieval Walls - the remains of the twelfth century walls, commissioned by Henry II of England, that surround the village, which were listed as a Monument historique in 2014.

== See also ==
- Communes of the Sarthe department
- Parc naturel régional Normandie-Maine
