= La Pallu =

Commune in France

- Commune
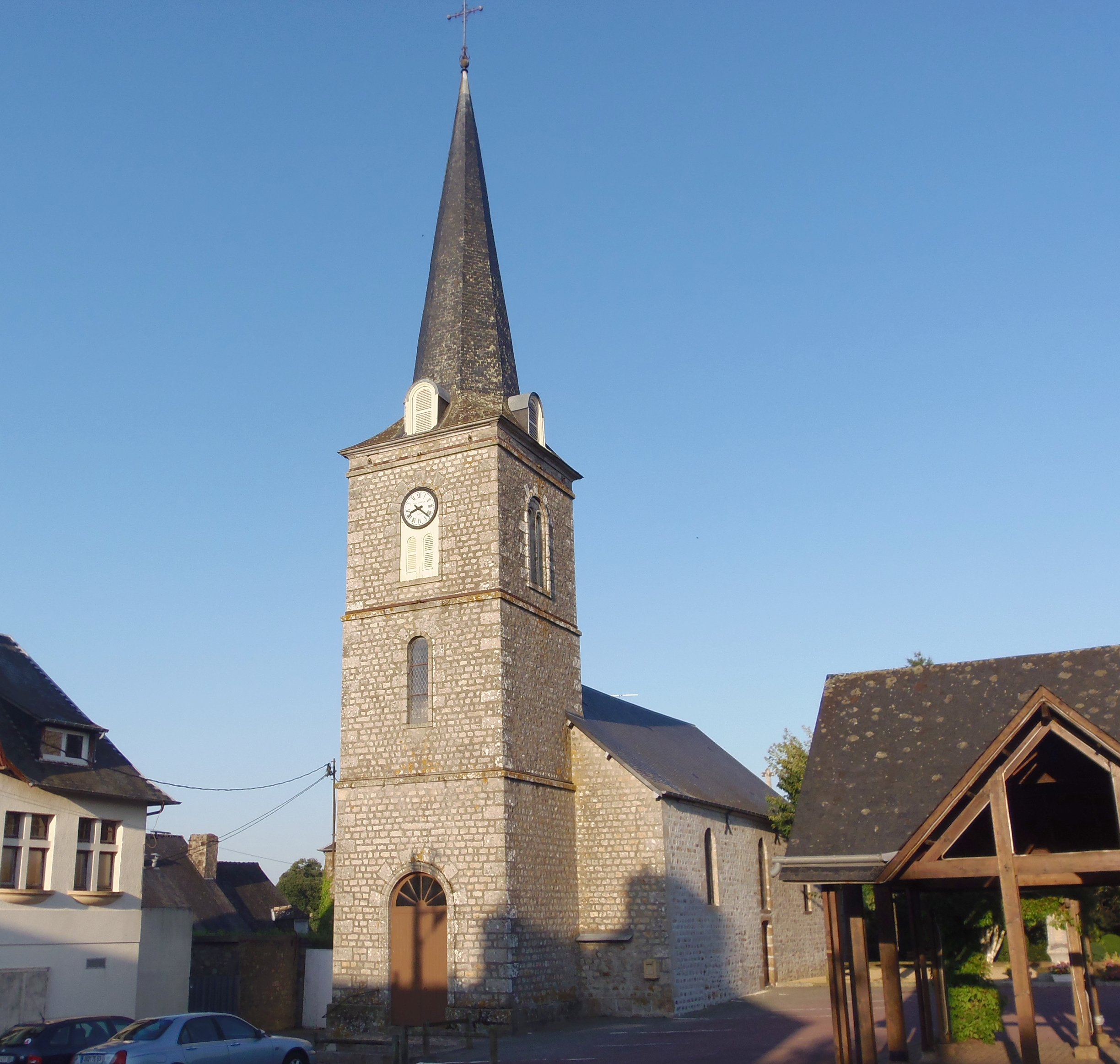
- The church of Saint-Sulpice, in La Pallu
- Location of La Pallu
- Location within France Location within Pays de la Loire
- Coordinates: 48°30′31″N 0°17′46″W
- Country: France
- Region: Pays de la Loire
- Department: Mayenne
- Arrondissement: Mayenne
- Canton: Villaines-la-Juhel

Government
  - Mayor (2020–2026): Sylvain Leblanc
- Area^{1}: 6.65 km^{2} (2.57 sq mi)
- Elevation: 170 m (560 ft)
- Highest elevation: 240 m (790 ft)
- Lowest elevation: 149 m (489 ft)
- Population (2023): 171
  - Density: 25.7/km^{2} (66.6/sq mi)
- Time zone: UTC+01:00 (CET)
  - Summer (DST): UTC+02:00 (CEST)
- INSEE/Postal code: 53173 /53140
- ^{1} French Land Register data, which excludes lakes, ponds, glaciers > 1 km^{2} (0.386 sq mi or 247 acres) and river estuaries.

La Pallu (French pronunciation: [la paly]) is a commune in the Mayenne department in northwestern France.

== Geography ==
The commune is made up of the following collection of villages and hamlets, La Mouffetière, Le Coudray, La Pallu and Le Boisleux.

The commune is located within the Normandie-Maine Regional Natural Park.

== See also ==
- Communes of Mayenne
- Parc naturel régional Normandie-Maine
