= Crissé =

- Commune
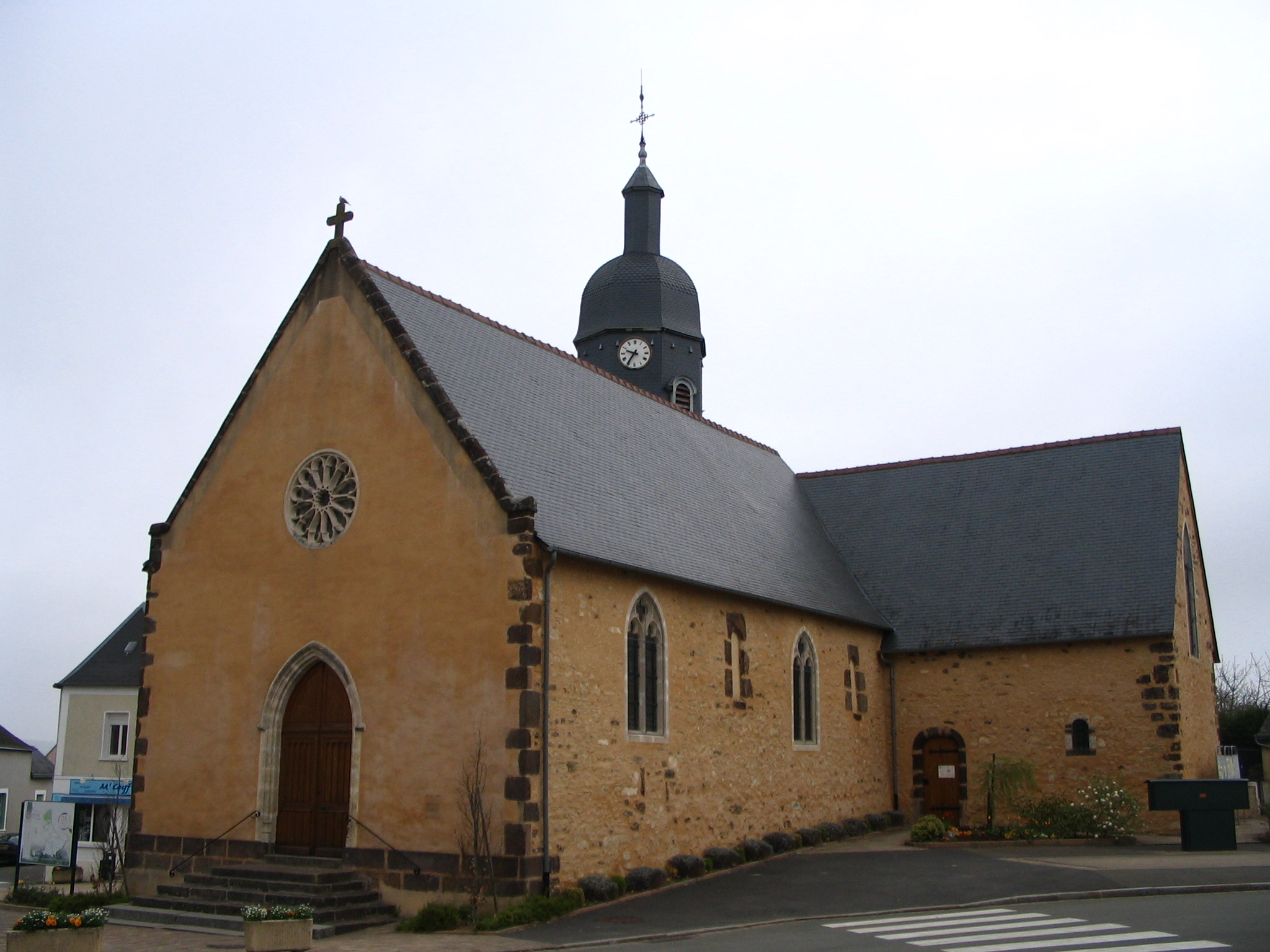
- The church of Saint Pierre
- Location of Crissé
- Location within France Location within Pays de la Loire
- Coordinates: 48°10′00″N 0°04′00″W
- Country: France
- Region: Pays de la Loire
- Department: Sarthe
- Arrondissement: Mamers
- Canton: Sillé-le-Guillaume
- Intercommunality: Champagne Conlinoise et Pays de Sillé

Government
  - Mayor (2020–2026): Sylvie Boullier
- Area^{1}: 20.83 km^{2} (8.04 sq mi)
- Highest elevation: 288 m (945 ft)
- Lowest elevation: 86 m (282 ft)
- Population (2023): 534
  - Density: 25.6/km^{2} (66.4/sq mi)
- Time zone: UTC+01:00 (CET)
  - Summer (DST): UTC+02:00 (CEST)
- INSEE/Postal code: 72109 /72140
- ^{1} French Land Register data, which excludes lakes, ponds, glaciers > 1 km^{2} (0.386 sq mi or 247 acres) and river estuaries.

Crissé (French pronunciation: [kʁise]) is a commune in the Sarthe department in the Pays de la Loire region in north-western France.

== See also ==
- Communes of the Sarthe department
- Parc naturel régional Normandie-Maine
