= Saint-Germain-de-Coulamer =

- Commune
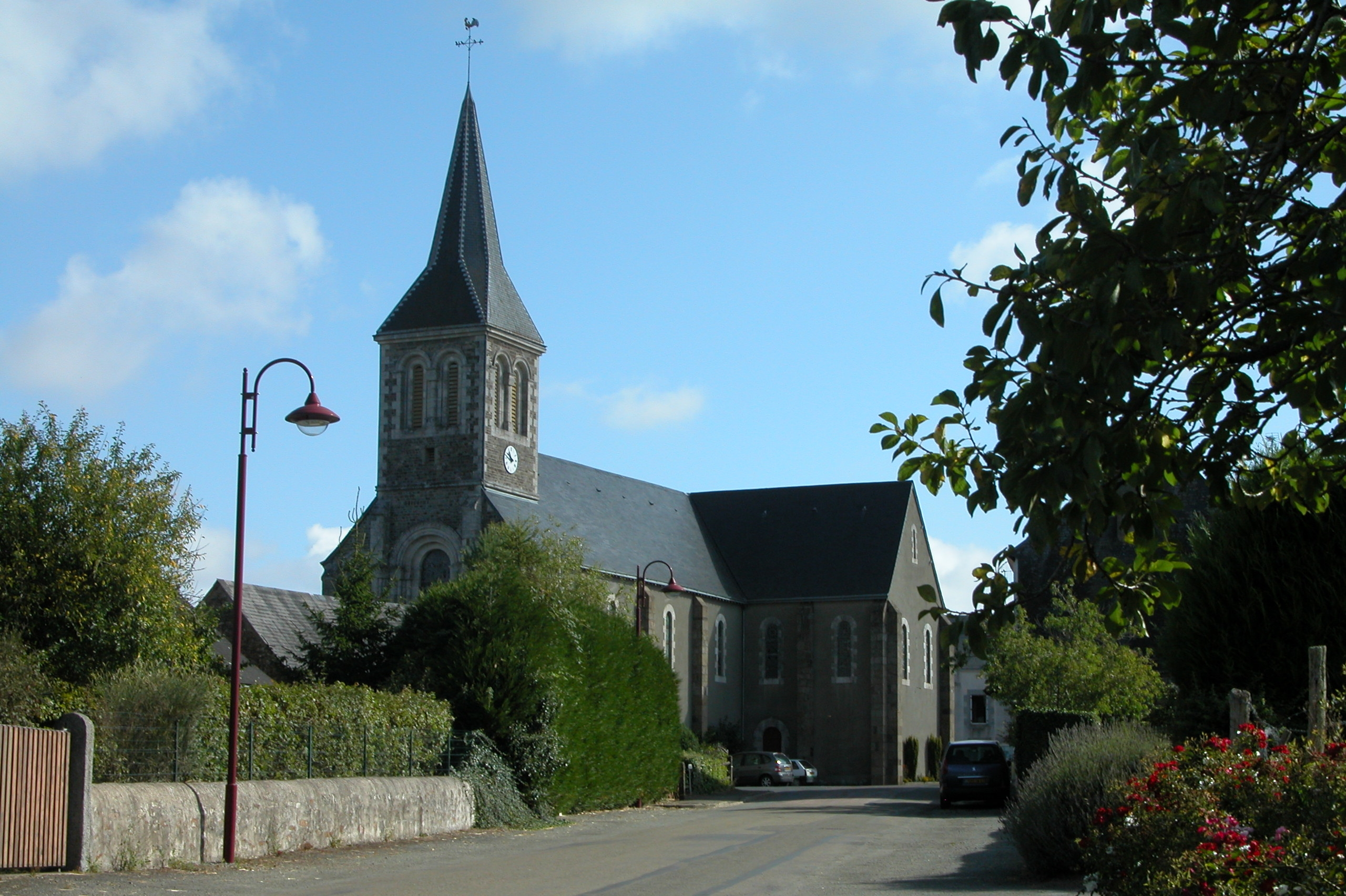
- The church in Saint-Germain-de-Coulamer
- Location of Saint-Germain-de-Coulamer
- Location within France Location within Pays de la Loire
- Coordinates: 48°15′52″N 0°10′14″W
- Country: France
- Region: Pays de la Loire
- Department: Mayenne
- Arrondissement: Mayenne
- Canton: Villaines-la-Juhel

Government
  - Mayor (2020–2026): Alain Dilis
- Area^{1}: 17.72 km^{2} (6.84 sq mi)
- Elevation: 170 m (560 ft)
- Highest elevation: 256 m (840 ft)
- Lowest elevation: 113 m (371 ft)
- Population (2023): 329
  - Density: 18.6/km^{2} (48.1/sq mi)
- Time zone: UTC+01:00 (CET)
  - Summer (DST): UTC+02:00 (CEST)
- INSEE/Postal code: 53223 /53700
- ^{1} French Land Register data, which excludes lakes, ponds, glaciers > 1 km^{2} (0.386 sq mi or 247 acres) and river estuaries.

Saint-Germain-de-Coulamer is a commune in the Mayenne department in north-western France.

== See also ==
- Communes of the Mayenne department
