= Saint-Aignan-de-Couptrain =

- Commune
- Coat of arms
- Location of Saint-Aignan-de-Couptrain
- Location within France Location within Pays de la Loire
- Coordinates: 48°27′24″N 0°18′06″W
- Country: France
- Region: Pays de la Loire
- Department: Mayenne
- Arrondissement: Mayenne
- Canton: Villaines-la-Juhel
- Intercommunality: CC du Mont des Avaloirs

Government
  - Mayor (2020–2026): Geneviève Blanchard
- Area^{1}: 17.42 km^{2} (6.73 sq mi)
- Elevation: 182 m (597 ft)
- Highest elevation: 212 m (696 ft)
- Lowest elevation: 136 m (446 ft)
- Population (2023): 349
  - Density: 20.0/km^{2} (51.9/sq mi)
- Time zone: UTC+01:00 (CET)
  - Summer (DST): UTC+02:00 (CEST)
- INSEE/Postal code: 53196 /53250
- ^{1} French Land Register data, which excludes lakes, ponds, glaciers > 1 km^{2} (0.386 sq mi or 247 acres) and river estuaries.

Saint-Aignan-de-Couptrain is a commune in the Mayenne department in north-western France.

== Geography ==
The commune is made up of the following collection of villages and hamlets, La Tirehaie, La Chabossière Haute, Saint-Aignan-de-Couptrain, La Ratterie, La Gendrie, La Hérissière, La Tremblaie and La Dreurie.

== See also ==
- Communes of Mayenne
