= Neuilly-le-Vendin =

- Commune
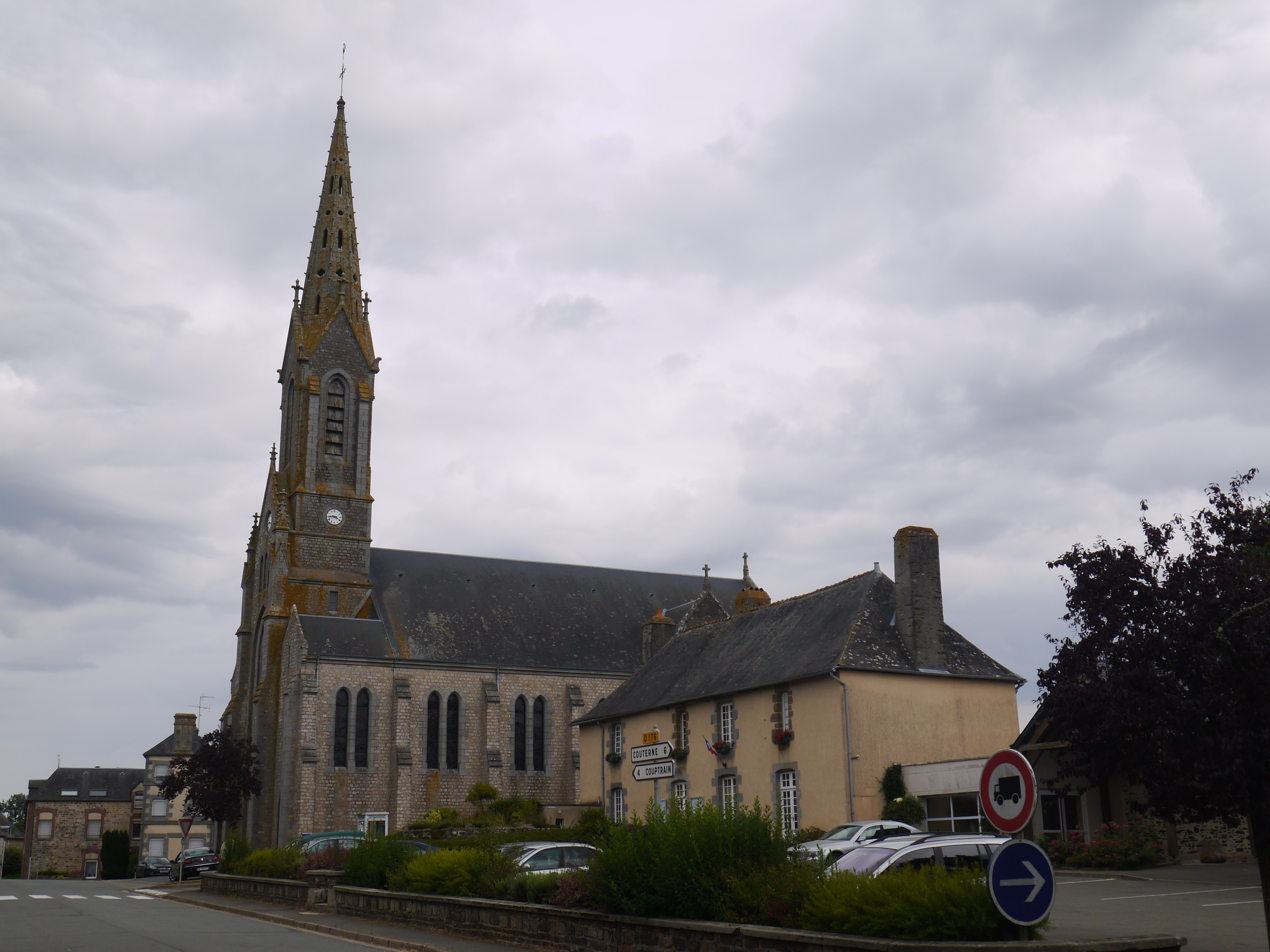
- Neuilly-le-Vendin Town hall

- Coat of arms
- Location of Neuilly-le-Vendin
- Location within France Location within Pays de la Loire
- Coordinates: 48°29′47″N 0°20′17″W
- Country: France
- Region: Pays de la Loire
- Department: Mayenne
- Arrondissement: Mayenne
- Canton: Villaines-la-Juhel

Government
  - Mayor (2020–2026): Daniel Chesneau
- Area^{1}: 14.60 km^{2} (5.64 sq mi)
- Elevation: 133 m (436 ft)
- Highest elevation: 223 m (732 ft)
- Lowest elevation: 127 m (417 ft)
- Population (2023): 352
  - Density: 24.1/km^{2} (62.4/sq mi)
- Time zone: UTC+01:00 (CET)
  - Summer (DST): UTC+02:00 (CEST)
- INSEE/Postal code: 53164 /53250
- ^{1} French Land Register data, which excludes lakes, ponds, glaciers > 1 km^{2} (0.386 sq mi or 247 acres) and river estuaries.

Neuilly-le-Vendin (French pronunciation: [nœji lə vɑ̃dɛ̃]) is a commune in the Mayenne department in north-western France.

== Geography ==
The commune is made up of the following collection of villages and hamlets, Marmaigne, Courd'houx, Neuilly-le-Vendin, Les Champs, Messigné and La Gouasnière.

The commune is located within the Normandie-Maine Regional Natural Park.

The river Mayenne flows through the commune.

== See also ==
- Communes of Mayenne
- Parc naturel régional Normandie-Maine
