= Robert Buron =

French politician (1910–1973)

Deputy Robert Buron
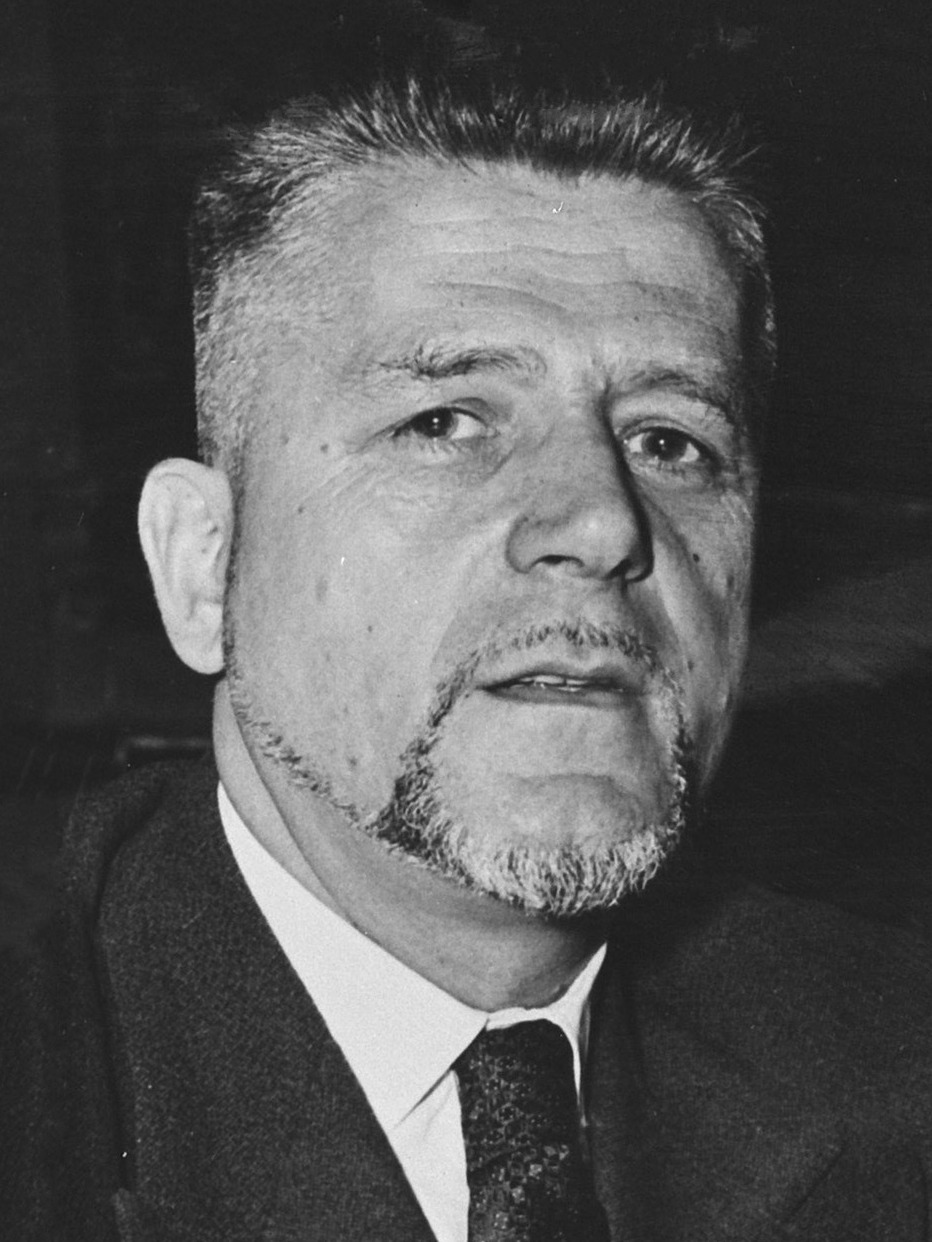

Finance Minister of France
- In office 8 January 1953 – 28 June 1953
- Prime Minister: René Mayer
- Preceded by: Edgar Faure - Maurice Bourgès-Maunoury - Edgar Faure
- Succeeded by: Pierre Pflimlin - Edgar Faure - Antoine Pinay

President of OECD
- In office 1962–1966

Mayor of Laval, Mayenne
- In office 1971–1973
- Preceded by: Francis Le Basser
- Succeeded by: André Pinçon

Personal details
- Born: Robert Albert Gaston Buron; 27 February 1910 Paris, France
- Died: 28 April 1973 (aged 63)
- Spouse: Marie-Louise Trouillard (1910-2006)
- Children: Martine Buron (born 1944)
- Profession: Politician

Robert Buron (27 February 1910 – 28 April 1973) was a French politician. Buron represented Mayenne as a deputy in the French National Assembly from 1945 to 1958 and was a minister in several French governments during France’s Fourth and early Fifth Republics, including a Minister of Finance from 20 January 1955 to 23 February 1955 and a Minister of Public Works, Transport, and Tourism from 9 June 1958 to 16 May 1962 under Charles de Gaulle.

== Biography ==
Buron was born in 1910 in Paris. He married Marie-Louise 'Melle' Trouillard (1910-2006) in July 1938, with whom he had a daughter, Martine Buron (1944-). Martine Buron was a Member of the European Parliament from 1984 until 1994, representing the Parti Socialiste.

Buron was kidnapped during the 1961 Algiers putsch. In 1965 he founded Objectif 72, a political movement.

In the last years of his life, Buron served as the mayor of Laval from 1971 to 1973, after previously being mayor of Villaines-la-Juhel between 1953 to 1970.

He died in 1973 in Paris. In his honor, the Lycée Robert Buron in Laval was named after him.

== Gallery ==
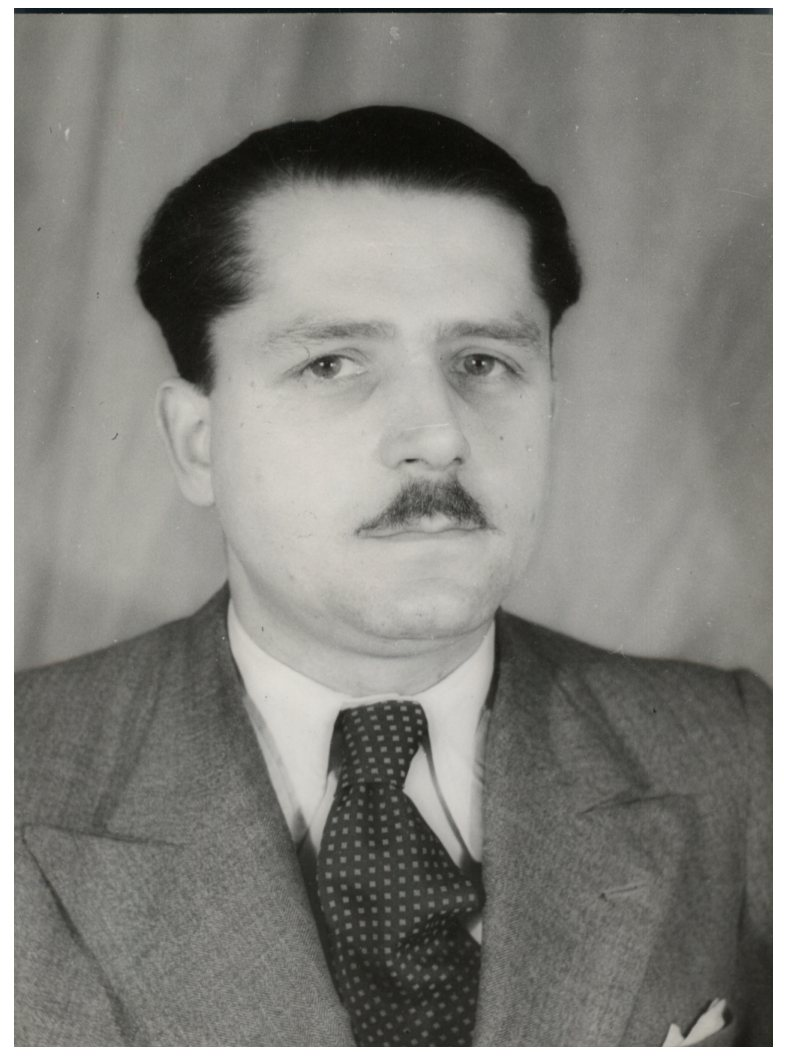
Robert Buron in 1945.

== Bibliography ==
- Marcel Launay, Robert Buron, témoignages de Pierre Pflimlin et Jean Offredo, Paris: Beauchesne, 1993, 208 p. (Politiques & chrétiens).
- Michel Gaignard, "Robert Buron s'implante en Mayenne", L'Oribus, num. 65, March 2006.
