= Jean-Jacques Reboux =

French writer and editor (1958–2021)

- Born: 29 October 1958; Madré, France
- Died: 13 July 2021 (aged 62); Auxerre
- Occupations: Writer; Editor

Jean-Jacques Reboux (29 October 1958 – 13 July 2021) was a French writer, poet, and editor.

== Biography ==
=== Early life ===
Born in Madré in 1958, Reboux held several careers in his early life, including work as a schoolteacher and cinema manager. Before his career as an editor, he was also a poet, writing the collection La Foire à bras.

=== Editor and writer ===
In 1992, Reboux founded Éditions Canaille in order to publish his books, which were refused by other publishers, including Pain perdu chez les vilains and Fondu au noir. With the help of Jean-Bernard Pouy, he published thrillers by other authors. In 1995, his company was bought by Éditions Baleine, and Reboux became director of the Canaille/Revolver collection. He published the first three books by Yasmina Khadra. Following the publication of Le massacre des innocents, he became a highly touted writer. In 1996, he was awarded a Trophée 813 for the best French language novel, Le massacre des innocents. He then wrote three books in the Le Poulpe collection: La cerise sur le gâteux in 1996, Parkinson le glas in 2002, and Castro c'est trop ! in 2004.

Specializing in soap opera books, he started the series Les aventures extraordinaires de Moulard in 2000. The first book in the series was titled Pour l'amour de Pénélope. Six of the 22 volumes in the series were published by Éditions de l'Aube in 2000.

=== Engaged editor ===
In 2006, Reboux began a tighter focus on editing with the foundation of Éditions Après la Lune alongside Christine Beigel and Yasmina Khadra. As leading editor, he was sued by Opus Dei in May 2007 over the novel Camino 999 by Catherine Fradier. The Catholic society sought €30,000 in damages, but the case was eventually dismissed. In 2011, Fradier sued the publishing house again over a minor dispute, but Reboux was supported by dozens of writers and editors. In 2013, Éditions Après la Lune ceased operations before resuming in 2019 to publish the works of Kits Hilaire.

=== Fernand Buron controversy ===
In 2008, Reboux attended the Paris International Agricultural Show, where he refused to shake the hand of President Nicolas Sarkozy. In the incident, which was filmed by a reporter from Le Parisien, Reboux said "Ah no, don't touch me!", to which Sarkozy replied, "Get lost, then". Reboux then replied "You're making me dirty". In a controversial move, Sarkozy retorted ""Get lost, then, poor dumb-ass, go." (Casse-toi pov'con!), which inspired the 2011 book Casse-toi pov'con ! by Fernand Buron. The case could have led to his arrest, but was dismissed by the public prosecutor. On 28 January 2010, Sarkozy's birthday, Reboux held a sign that read "Casse-toi pov'con!" in front of the Élysée Palace.

=== Political engagement ===
Although he claimed not to be a political activist, Reboux was a committed left-winger and sympathized with the anarchist movement. However, he claimed that his only act of "militancy" was the sponsorship of an undocumented Moroccan during the time of the Debré laws. In 2008, he met with Romain Durand, an activist within Réseau éducation sans frontières and the Confédération nationale du travail, and the pair wrote Lettre au garde des sceaux pour la dépénalisation du délit d'outrage. In July 2008, he was a co-founder of Collectif pour une dépénalisation du délit d'outrage.

From 2008 to 2010, Reboux published several articles on the website Rue89 under the pseudonym "outrageur de poulets" (outrageous chickens) with offensive outrage. In 2013, he posted a blog on his quarrels with Algerian writer Yasmina Khadra, who was becoming increasingly controversial in the Algerian community, titled Comment je me suis fait entuber par Yasmina Khadra. On 23 October 2014, he covered the trial of Henri Guaino for L'Humanité.

=== Death ===
Jean-Jacques Reboux died on 13 July 2021, at the age of 62, in Auxerre.

== Works ==
=== Essays ===
- Lettre ouverte à Nicolas Sarkozy, ministre des libertés policières (2006)
- Chômeurs, qu'attendez-vous pour disparaître ? (2007)
- Lettre au garde des Sceaux pour une dépénalisation du délit d'outrage (2008)
- Casse-toi pov'con ! (2010)

=== News ===
- Le Nonos de canard, in Noces de canailles (1994)
- Urubu roi (1996)
- Dissous, ris et dégomme, in L'évènement du Jeudi (1998)
- Ben Laden a tué Mamie Dupré, in 36 nouvelles noires pour l'Humanité (2004)
- T'as de la chance qu'il soit pas président ! (2007)
- Donnez-moi un mouchoir, je vais me reposer (2013)
- C'est sans danger (2014)

=== Poetry ===
- Le Matin majuscule (1978)
- Fleuve rouge (1983)
- Le bout du gras (1984)

=== Novels ===
- Pain perdu chez les vilains (1992)
- Mr. Smith n'aime pas les asperges (1993)
- Fondu au noir (1995)
- Le massacre des innocents (1995)
- La cerise sur le gâteux (1996)
- Poste mortem (1998)
- Pour l'amour de Pénélope (2000)
- Le paradis des pickpockets (2000)
- C'est à cause des poules (2000)
- Le voyage de monsieur Victor (2001)
- Méfiez-vous des asperges ! (2001)
- Pourquoi j' ai tué Laetitia Remington (2001)
- Parkinson le glas (2002)
- Castro c'est trop ! (2004)
- Au bonheur des poules ! (2006)
- De Gaulle, Van Gogh, ma femme et moi (2006)
- Je suis partout (les derniers jours de Nicolas Sarkozy) (2010)
- L'esprit Bénuchot (2016)

=== Youth novels ===
- Le diable dans le rétroviseur (2016)
