= Lignières-Orgères =

- Commune
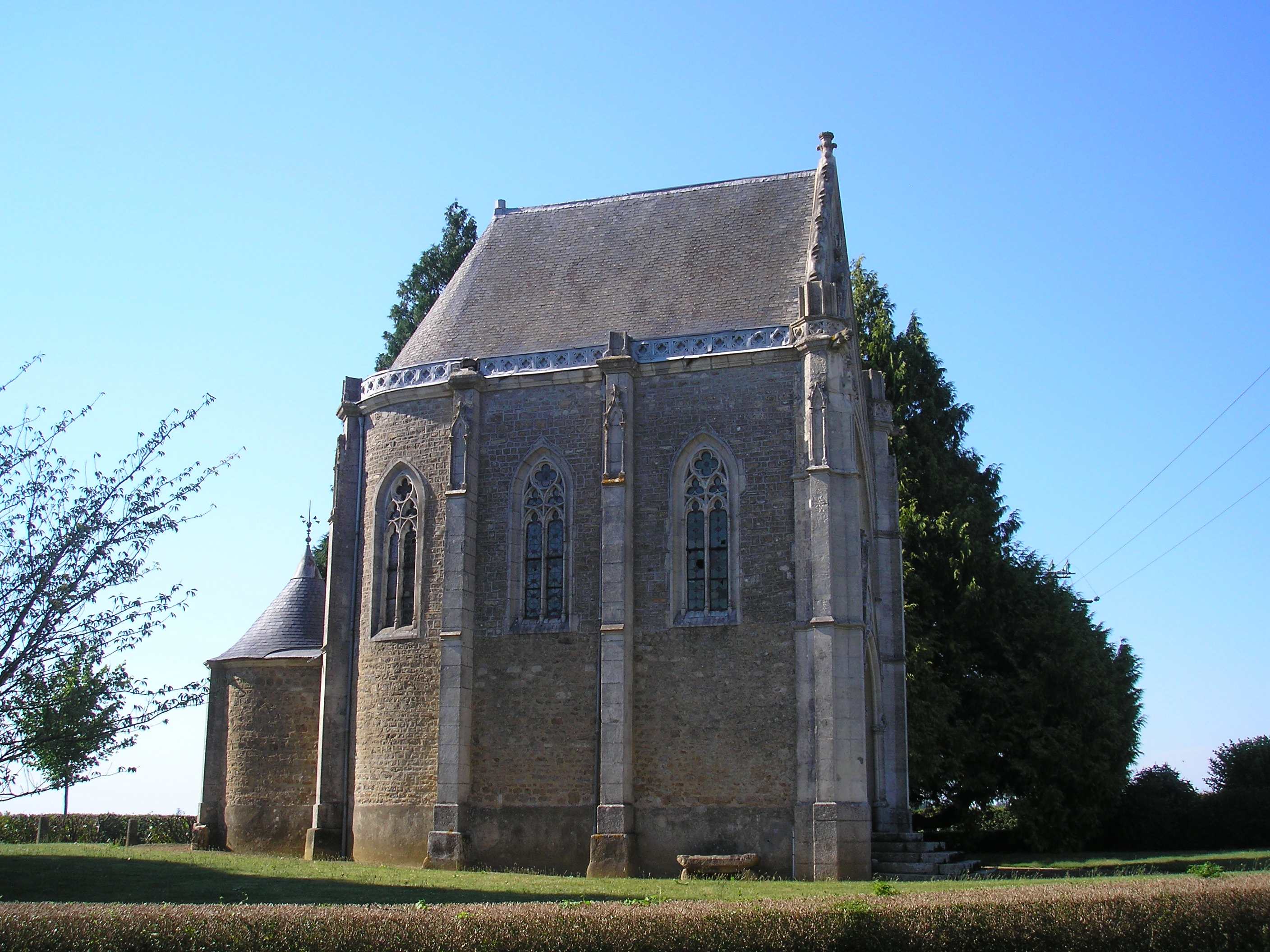
- The chapel of Notre-Dame-de-Lourdes, in Lignières-Orgères
- Location of Lignières-Orgères
- Location within France Location within Pays de la Loire
- Coordinates: 48°32′34″N 0°12′20″W
- Country: France
- Region: Pays de la Loire
- Department: Mayenne
- Arrondissement: Mayenne
- Canton: Villaines-la-Juhel
- Intercommunality: Mont des Avaloirs

Government
  - Mayor (2020–2026): Raymond Lelièvre
- Area^{1}: 40.89 km^{2} (15.79 sq mi)
- Elevation: 280 m (920 ft)
- Highest elevation: 360 m (1,180 ft)
- Lowest elevation: 205 m (673 ft)
- Population (2023): 719
  - Density: 17.6/km^{2} (45.5/sq mi)
- Demonym(s): Lignièrois, Lignièroises
- Time zone: UTC+01:00 (CET)
  - Summer (DST): UTC+02:00 (CEST)
- INSEE/Postal code: 53133 /53140
- ^{1} French Land Register data, which excludes lakes, ponds, glaciers > 1 km^{2} (0.386 sq mi or 247 acres) and river estuaries.

Lignières-Orgères (French pronunciation: [liɲjɛʁ ɔʁʒɛʁ]) is a commune in the Mayenne department in north-western France.

== Geography ==
The commune is made up of the following collection of villages and hamlets, Orgères la-Roche, La Lambertière, Les Noës, La Cornière, Le Gassel, La Godardière, Hyeau, La Haie Portée, La Touchefouillère, La Fouchardière, La Trévannière, Les Sénaillères and La Pâquerie.

The commune is located within the Normandie-Maine Regional Natural Park.

== Population ==
Historical population
Year	Pop.	±% p.a.
1968	986	—
1975	887	−1.50%
1982	855	−0.52%
1990	773	−1.25%
1999	735	−0.56%
2007	731	−0.07%
2012	752	+0.57%
2017	742	−0.27%
2023	719	−0.52%
Source: INSEE

== Points of Interest ==
- Les Roches d'Orgeres - is natural site where a cluster of gigantic granite boulders. There is a local legand that the rocks were a fairy dwelling.

== See also ==
- Communes of the Mayenne department
- Parc naturel régional Normandie-Maine
