= Normandie-Maine Regional Natural Park =

Protected area in France

Coordinates: 48°29′24″N 0°13′17″W

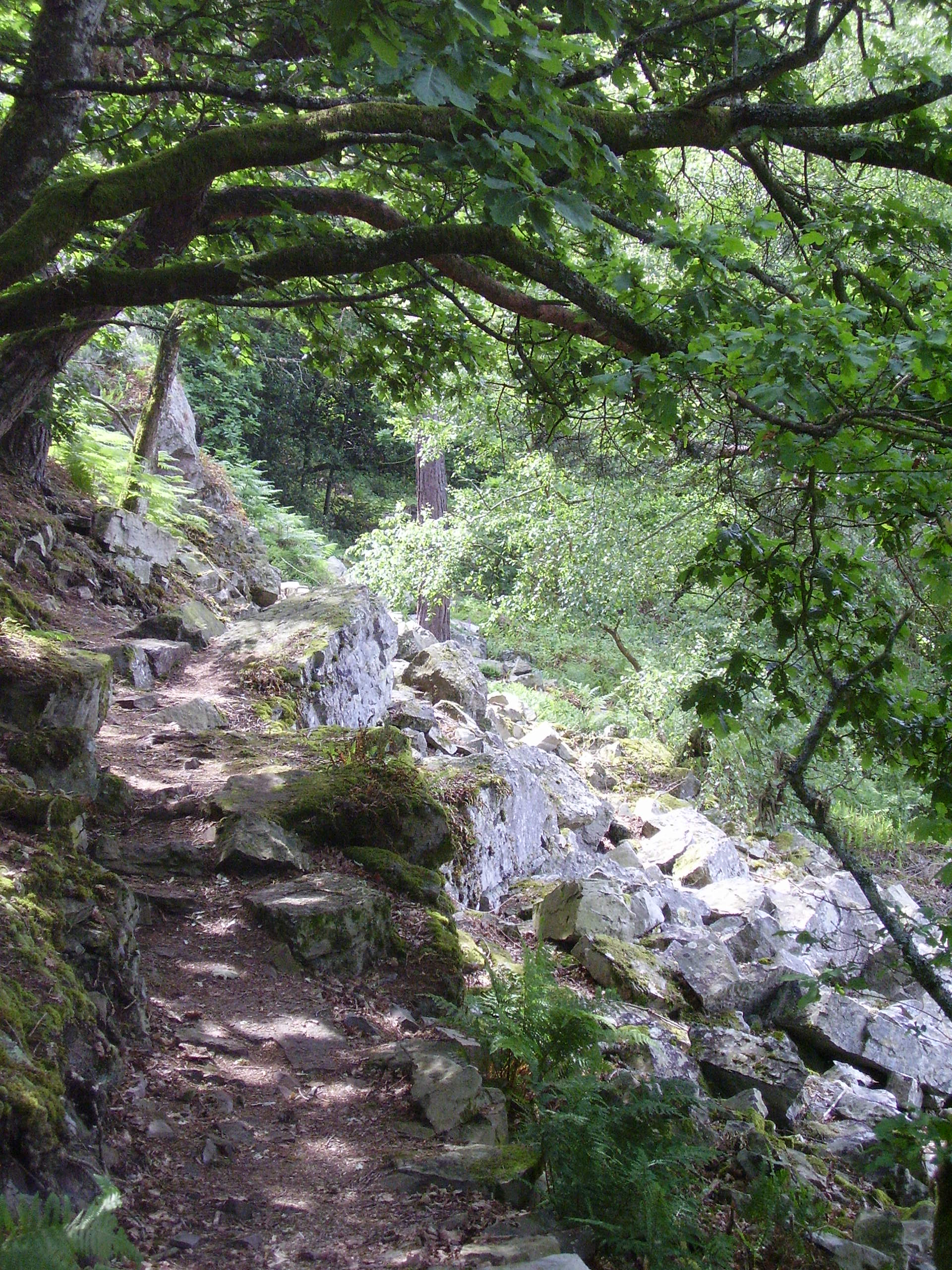
- Trail in Gorges de Villiers
- Interactive map of Normandie-Maine Regional Natural Park
- Location: Normandy; Pays de la Loire, Orne; Manche; Mayenne; Sarthe, France
- Governing body: Fédération des parcs naturels régionaux de France
- Website: www.parc-naturel-normandie-maine.fr

Normandie-Maine Regional Natural Park (Fr.: Parc naturel régional Normandie-Maine) is a protected area of forest and bocage located in the French regions of Normandy and Pays de la Loire.

== Geography ==
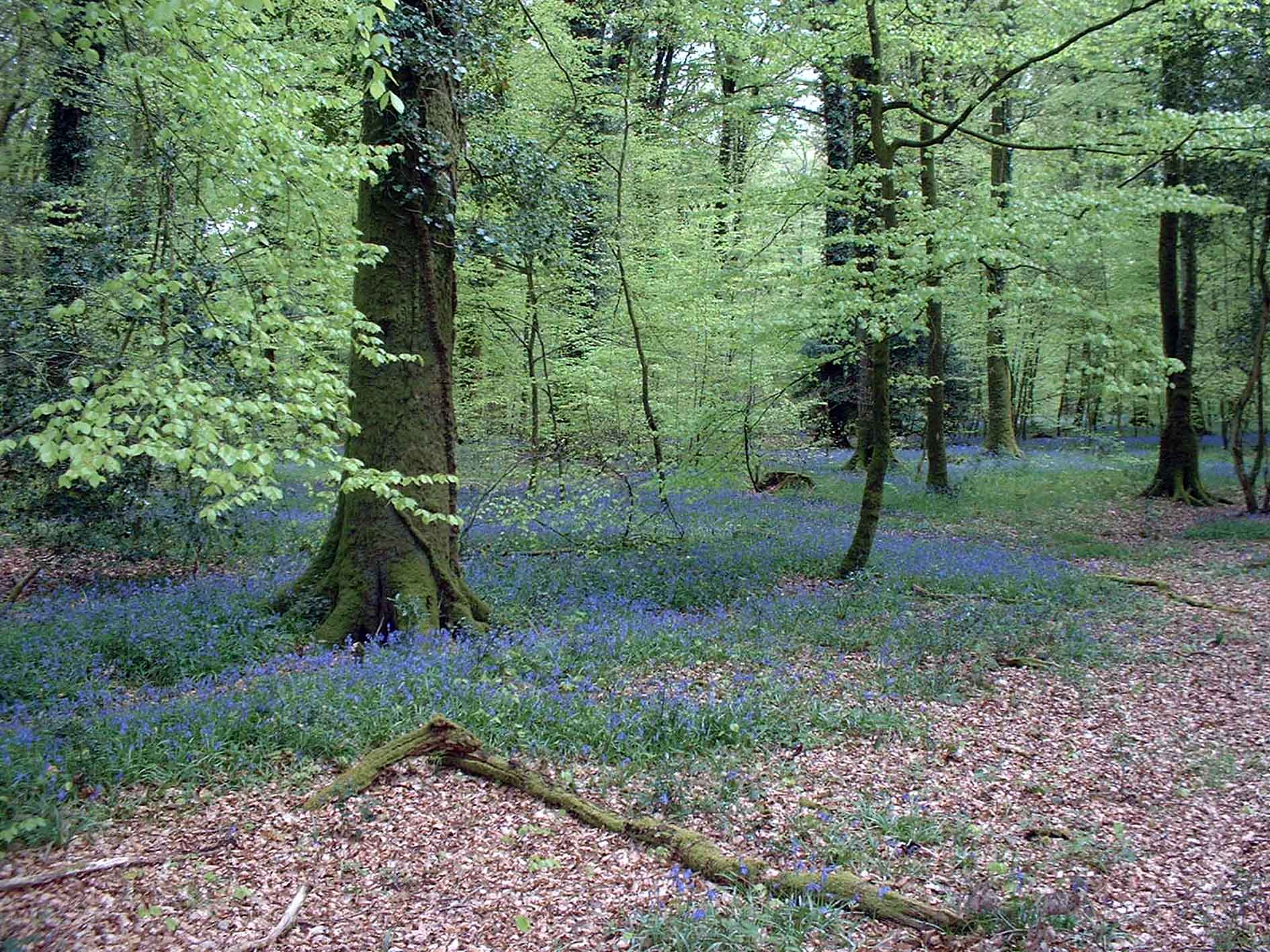
Forest of Andaines

Spanning the departments of Orne, Manche, Mayenne, and Sarthe, the Normandie-Maine park was created in 1975 with a total area of 234,000 hectares (580,000 acres). As of 2011, the parkland has expanded to a total area of 257,000 hectares (640,000 acres) and includes 164 communes with fourteen associated partner communes; the number of inhabitants within the park is approximately 171,000. The park encompasses the Sarthe river valley and the large Forest of Andaines.

=== Conservation areas ===
The park contains seventeen sites that have been listed as Natura 2000 protected areas. Twelve of these protected areas are managed by the park, with 5 being managed by other external bodies.

List of Natura 2000 sites wiuthin the Normandie-Maine Regional Natural Park;

1. Alpes Mancelles
2. Ancienne champignonnière des Petites Hayes - managed by Conservatoire d'espaces naturels de Normandie
3. Anciennes Mines de Barenton et de Bion
4. Bassin de l'Andainette
5. Bocage à Osmoderma eremita au nord de la forêt de Perseigne - managed by Chambre d'agriculture Pays de la Loire
6. Bocage à Osmoderma eremita entre Sillé-le-Guillaume et la Grande-Charnie - managed by Chambre d'agriculture Pays de la Loire
7. Bocage de la forêt de la Monnaie à Javron-les-Chapelles
8. Combles de la chapelle de l'Oratoire de Passais - managed by Conservatoire d'espaces naturels de Normandie
9. Corniche de Pail et forêt de Multonne
10. Etang de Saosnes et forêt de Perseigne
11. Forêt de Sillé
12. Haute vallée de l'Orne et affluents - managed by CPIE Collines normandes
13. Haute vallée de la Sarthe
14. Landes du Tertre Bizet et Fosse Arthour
15. Sites d'Ecouves
16. Vallée de Rutin, Coteau de Chaumiton
17. Vallée du Sarthon et affluents

The park also contains a Regional Nature Reserve that is 0.37 hectares in area, making it the smallest nature reserve in France, called La carrière des Vaux.

== Member communes ==
The park is spread across 136 communes.

1. Aillières-Beauvoir
2. Ambrières-les-Vallées
3. Ancinnes
4. Assé-le-Boisne
5. Aunay-les-Bois
6. Avrilly
7. Bagnoles de l'Orne Normandie
8. Barenton
9. Beauvain
10. Boischampré
11. Boitron
12. Boulay-les-Ifs
13. Bourg-le-Roi
14. Bursard
15. Carrouges
16. Ceaucé
17. Chahains
18. Champfrémont
19. Champsecret
20. Chenay
21. Colombiers
22. Coulonges-sur-Sarthe
23. Couptrain
24. Crissé
25. Cuissai
26. Domfront en Poiraie
27. Dompierre
28. Douillet
29. Écouves
30. Essay
31. Francheville
32. Gandelain
33. Ger
34. Gesvres
35. Hauterive
36. Héloup
37. Joué-du-Bois
38. Juvigny Val d'Andaine
39. La Bellière
40. La Chapelle-près-Sées
41. La Chaux
42. La Coulonche
43. La Ferrière-aux-Étangs
44. La Ferrière-Béchet
45. La Ferrière-Bochard
46. La Ferté-Macé
47. La Lande-de-Goult
48. La Motte-Fouquet
49. La Pallu
50. La Roche-Mabile
51. Lalacelle
52. Laleu
53. Larré
54. Lassay-les-Châteaux
55. Le Bouillon
56. Le Cercueil
57. Le Champ-de-la-Pierre
58. Le Grez
59. Le Housseau-Brétignolles
60. Le Ménil-Broût
61. Le Ménil-Scelleur
62. Les Aulneaux
63. Les Monts d'Andaine
64. Les Ventes-de-Bourse
65. Lignières-Orgères
66. Livet-en-Saosnois
67. Lonlay-l'Abbaye
68. L'Orée-d'Écouves
69. Louzes
70. Magny-le-Désert
71. Mantilly
72. Marchemaisons
73. Méhoudin
74. Ménil-Erreux
75. Mieuxcé
76. Mont-Saint-Jean
77. Mortain-Bocage
78. Mortrée
79. Moulins-le-Carbonnel
80. Neauphe-sous-Essai
81. Neufchâtel-en-Saosnois
82. Neuilly-le-Bisson
83. Neuilly-le-Vendin
84. Pacé
85. Passais Villages
86. Perrou
87. Pezé-le-Robert
88. Pré-en-Pail-Saint-Samson
89. Ravigny
90. Rennes-en-Grenouilles
91. Rives d'Andaine
92. Rouessé-Vassé
93. Rouperroux
94. Saint-Aubin-d'Appenai
95. Saint-Bômer-les-Forges
96. Saint-Brice
97. Saint-Calais-du-Désert
98. Saint-Céneri-le-Gérei
99. Saint-Cyr-du-Bailleul
100. Saint-Cyr-en-Pail
101. Saint-Denis-sur-Sarthon
102. Sainte-Marguerite-de-Carrouges
103. Sainte-Marie-du-Bois
104. Sainte-Marie-la-Robert
105. Saint-Fraimbault
106. Saint-Georges-de-Rouelley
107. Saint-Georges-le-Gaultier
108. Saint-Gervais-du-Perron
109. Saint-Gilles-des-Marais
110. Saint-Julien-sur-Sarthe
111. Saint-Léger-sur-Sarthe
112. Saint-Léonard-des-Bois
113. Saint-Longis
114. Saint-Mars-d'Égrenne
115. Saint-Martin-des-Landes
116. Saint-Martin-l'Aiguillon
117. Saint-Nicolas-des-Bois
118. Saint-Ouen-le-Brisoult
119. Saint-Patrice-du-Désert
120. Saint-Paul-le-Gaultier
121. Saint-Pierre-des-Nids
122. Saint-Rémy-de-Sillé
123. Saint-Rémy-du-Val
124. Saint-Roch-sur-Égrenne
125. Saint-Sauveur-de-Carrouges
126. Sées
127. Sillé-le-Guillaume
128. Sougé-le-Ganelon
129. Tanville
130. Tessé-Froulay
131. Thubœuf
132. Torchamp
133. Villaines-la-Carelle
134. Villeneuve-en-Perseigne
135. Villepail
136. Vimartin-sur-Orthe

== See also ==
- List of regional natural parks of France
