= Loupfougères =

- Commune
- Location of Loupfougères
- Location within France Location within Pays de la Loire
- Coordinates: 48°20′21″N 0°20′51″W
- Country: France
- Region: Pays de la Loire
- Department: Mayenne
- Arrondissement: Mayenne
- Canton: Villaines-la-Juhel

Government
  - Mayor (2020–2026): Dominique Bourgault
- Area^{1}: 18.76 km^{2} (7.24 sq mi)
- Elevation: 200 m (660 ft)
- Highest elevation: 299 m (981 ft)
- Lowest elevation: 154 m (505 ft)
- Population (2023): 408
  - Density: 21.7/km^{2} (56.3/sq mi)
- Time zone: UTC+01:00 (CET)
  - Summer (DST): UTC+02:00 (CEST)
- INSEE/Postal code: 53139 /53700
- ^{1} French Land Register data, which excludes lakes, ponds, glaciers > 1 km^{2} (0.386 sq mi or 247 acres) and river estuaries.

Loupfougères (French pronunciation: [lufuʒɛʁ]) is a commune in the Mayenne department in north-western France.

== Geography ==
The commune is made up of the following collection of villages and hamlets, La Solachère, La Hélonnière, Loupfougères, La Dorière, Le Bois Roger, La Boisnière and La Houdairie.

== See also ==
- Communes of the Mayenne department
