= Villaines-la-Juhel =

- Commune
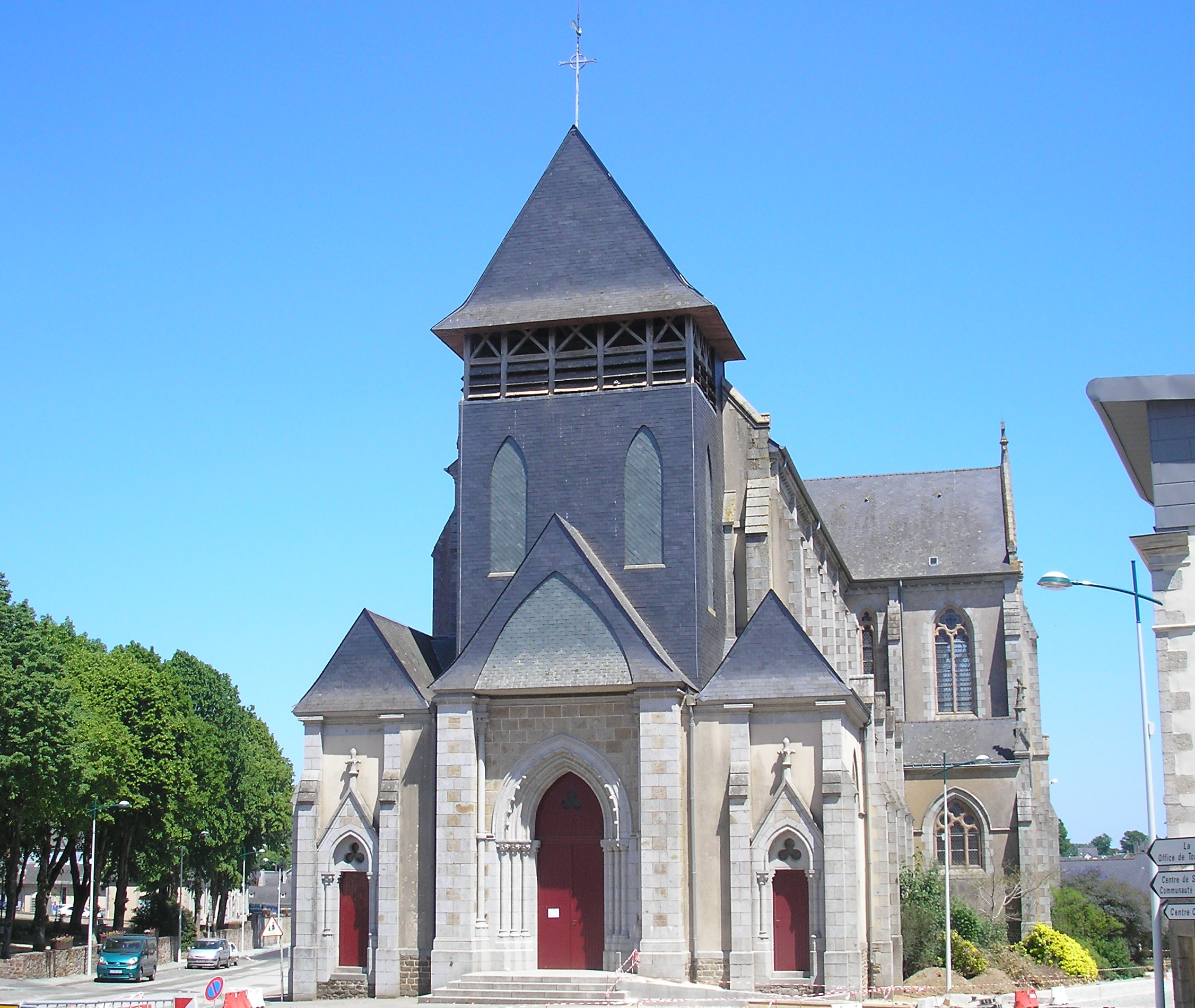
- The church of Saint-Georges, in Villaines-la-Juhel

- Coat of arms
- Location of Villaines-la-Juhel
- Location within France Location within Pays de la Loire
- Coordinates: 48°20′43″N 0°16′43″W
- Country: France
- Region: Pays de la Loire
- Department: Mayenne
- Arrondissement: Mayenne
- Canton: Villaines-la-Juhel

Government
  - Mayor (2020–2026): Daniel Lenoir
- Area^{1}: 28.90 km^{2} (11.16 sq mi)
- Elevation: 180 m (590 ft)
- Highest elevation: 238 m (781 ft)
- Lowest elevation: 155 m (509 ft)
- Population (2023): 2,671
  - Density: 92.42/km^{2} (239.4/sq mi)
- Time zone: UTC+01:00 (CET)
  - Summer (DST): UTC+02:00 (CEST)
- INSEE/Postal code: 53271 /53700
- ^{1} French Land Register data, which excludes lakes, ponds, glaciers > 1 km^{2} (0.386 sq mi or 247 acres) and river estuaries.

Villaines-la-Juhel (French pronunciation: [vilɛn la ʒy.ɛl]) is a commune in the Mayenne department in north-western France.

== Geography ==
The town of Villaines-la-Juhel was not created by chance. Its position on a strategic Roman way was what enabled it to develop into the city which we know today. Its size confers a position of a town of the third rank on a departmental scale, at the demographic and administrative level. Villaines-la-Juhel is a relatively insulated rural pole and depends on other administrative divisions.

Villaines-la-Juhel counts 3180 inhabitants without double accounts. The commune covers 29 km^{2} and has an average density of 110 inhabitants/km^{2}. It is the eleventh commune and the ninth most populated agglomeration department of Mayenne. It is located in the North-eastern part of Mayenne, with 56 kilometres of the Prefecture of the department, i.e. Laval. Its position, with the variation of the main roads, the great agglomerations, and the shoed network makes of Villaines-la-Juhel, a central pole for all this part of the department.

The city is close to the eastern border of Mayenne. Its canton is bordering on the department of Sarthe, and very near to the border of l'Orne. It is in the center of a triangle made up in the North-East by Pré-en-Pail, in the West by Mayenne and South-east by Sillé-le-Guillaume in la Sarthe. Each one of these towns of importance, on the scale of Mayenne, is separated by 16 to 28 kilometres from Villaines-la-Juhel. The commune is far away from the great national highways and motorway but the secondary roads radiate from there throughout the canton. That reinforces the idea that it is a true centre of attraction on its canton.

The commune is made up of the following collection of villages and hamlets, La Pitardière, Le Grand Vauboir, Villaines-la-Juhel, La Haute Breneudière, La Richardière, Le Cousin, La Bougellière, Coullion, La Milcendière and Le Petit Coudray.

== History ==
The Roman road from Jublains to Lisieux passed near the current agglomeration, which indicates an occupation of the site at that time. With the Middle Ages, the Lord of Mayenne established a castle on a hillock not far from the borough de Saint-Georges, centre of the town. Aiglibert, Bishop of Le Mans, gave to the Monastery of Sainte-Marie half of said of Villaines, Trans, Thorigné, July 9, 692. These localities are also confirmed to Saint-Aldric by Louis Débonnaire in 892, but under the name of Vilhena.

In 1140, Mathilde of England gave the ground of Villaines, to Juhel II de Mayenne, in thanks for the services which he had rendered. The seigniory took its name then. A fortress was built at that time, in ruin since the war of the English and of which remains today, bases of the keep.

Villaines-la-Juhel initially formed a châtellenie, chief town for the franks-fiefs of one of the seigniories of Maine in 1312 and concerning the county of Maine. The family of Champagne occupied the ground of Villaines-la-Juhel until the French Revolution. The fibers of flax and hemp used in manufactures of Alençon and of Mayenne came from Villaines-la-Juhel. The borough also exported eggs, butter, poultries and pigs.

After the 2nd world war, a deputy of Mayenne, Robert Buron, became several times minister, was to advise General and Mayor of Villaines-la-Juhel. It was under his impulse and his relayed by the successive municipalities that the city took a new rise. The presence of large companies testify to this dynamism even though today the commune undergoes some delocalization. The city obtained important industrial companies, thus employing a great number of employees.

However, many suffered from the closing of several great production facilities as the factory Seb-Moulinex which had employed several hundreds of employees. However, other industries (materials of office automation, manufacture of multi-media supports, etc.) have a dynamic activity and employ a significant part of the local working population.

== Population ==
Historical population
Year	Pop.	±% p.a.
1968	2,321	—
1975	2,732	+2.36%
1982	3,081	+1.73%
1990	3,171	+0.36%
1999	3,179	+0.03%
2007	3,095	−0.33%
2012	2,978	−0.77%
2017	2,808	−1.17%
2023	2,671	−0.83%
Source: INSEE

== Points of Interest ==
- Le Donjon - Remains of an eleventh century Keep that is the highest point in the commune at 210 metres high.

=== National Heritage sites ===
- Eglise Saint-Georges - a church, which was listed as a Monument historique in 1962.

== Notable people ==
- Madeleine Grey - (1896 – 1979) a classical singer who was born here.
- Robert Buron - (1910 – 1973) a French politician was mayor here from 1953 to 1970.

== Sports ==
Villaines-la-Juhel is a control on Paris-Brest-Paris, a long-distance cycling event organized each fourth year.

== Twin towns ==
Saint-Fraimbault is twinned with:

- Bad Liebenzell, Germany, since 1992

== See also ==
- Communes of the Mayenne department
