= Champfrémont =

- Commune
- Coat of arms
- Location of Champfrémont
- Location within France Location within Pays de la Loire
- Coordinates: 48°25′40″N 0°05′24″W
- Country: France
- Region: Pays de la Loire
- Department: Mayenne
- Arrondissement: Mayenne
- Canton: Villaines-la-Juhel

Government
  - Mayor (2020–2026): Patrick Piquet
- Area^{1}: 13.13 km^{2} (5.07 sq mi)
- Elevation: 230 m (750 ft)
- Highest elevation: 400 m (1,300 ft)
- Lowest elevation: 172 m (564 ft)
- Population (2023): 282
  - Density: 21.5/km^{2} (55.6/sq mi)
- Time zone: UTC+01:00 (CET)
  - Summer (DST): UTC+02:00 (CEST)
- INSEE/Postal code: 53052 /53370
- ^{1} French Land Register data, which excludes lakes, ponds, glaciers > 1 km^{2} (0.386 sq mi or 247 acres) and river estuaries.

Champfrémont (French pronunciation: [ʃɑ̃fʁemɔ̃]) is a commune in the Mayenne department in north-western France.

== Geography ==
The commune is made up of the following collection of villages and hamlets, Les Émondes, Les Fossés, Champfrémont, Coslay, L'Erardière and Vaucillon.

The commune is in the Normandie-Maine Regional Natural Park.

== Points of Interest ==
=== National Heritage sites ===
- Domaine de la Bellière - a seventeenth century chateaux that was listed as Monument historique in 1995.

== See also ==
- Communes of Mayenne
- Parc naturel régional Normandie-Maine
