= Saint-Pierre-des-Nids =

- Commune
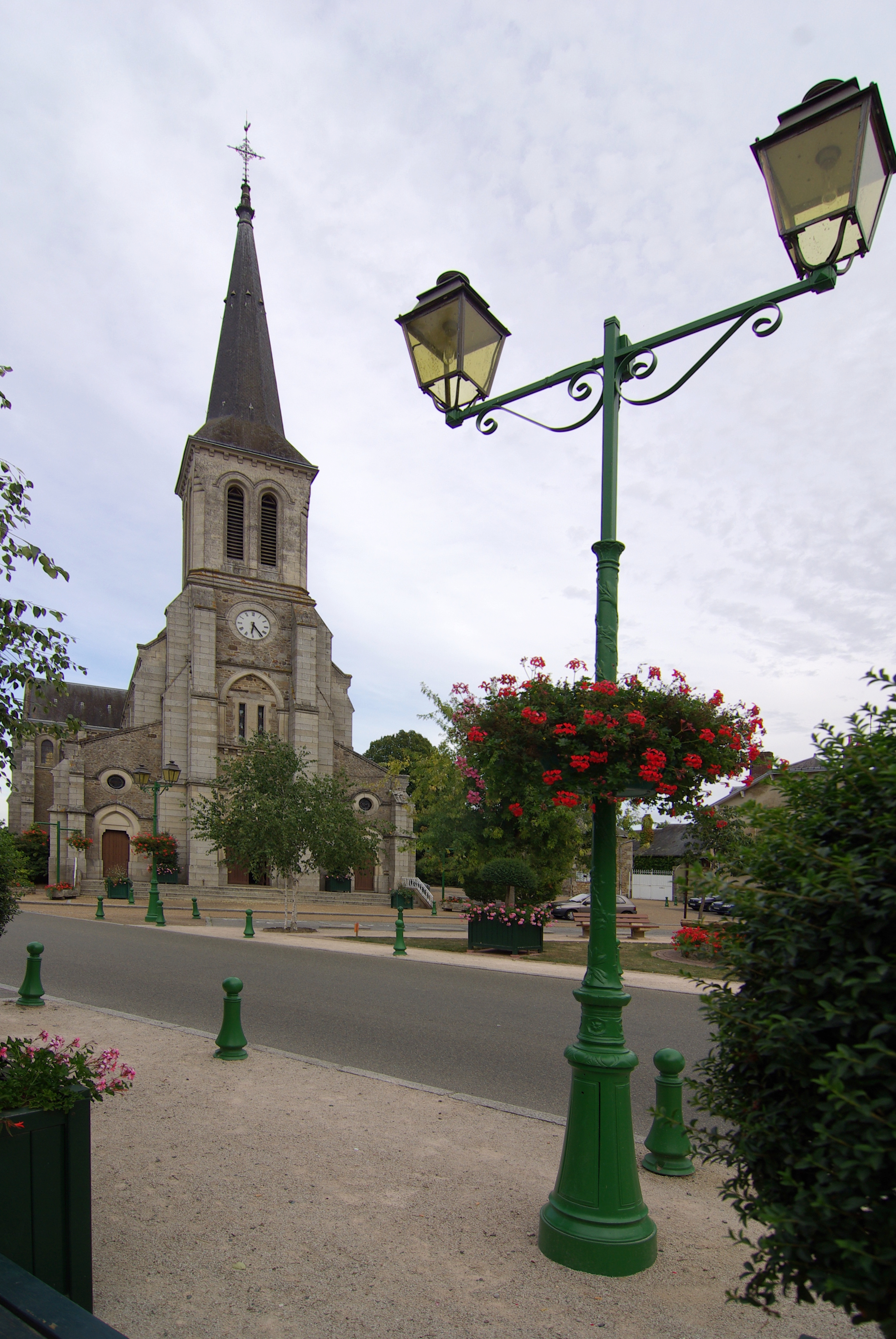
- The church in Saint-Pierre-des-Nids

- Coat of arms
- Location of Saint-Pierre-des-Nids
- Location within France Location within Pays de la Loire
- Coordinates: 48°23′59″N 0°05′54″W
- Country: France
- Region: Pays de la Loire
- Department: Mayenne
- Arrondissement: Mayenne
- Canton: Villaines-la-Juhel

Government
  - Mayor (2020–2026): Philippe D'Argent
- Area^{1}: 37.34 km^{2} (14.42 sq mi)
- Elevation: 182 m (597 ft)
- Highest elevation: 272 m (892 ft)
- Lowest elevation: 106 m (348 ft)
- Population (2023): 1,748
  - Density: 46.81/km^{2} (121.2/sq mi)
- Time zone: UTC+01:00 (CET)
  - Summer (DST): UTC+02:00 (CEST)
- INSEE/Postal code: 53246 /53370
- ^{1} French Land Register data, which excludes lakes, ponds, glaciers > 1 km^{2} (0.386 sq mi or 247 acres) and river estuaries.

Saint-Pierre-des-Nids (French pronunciation: [sɛ̃ pjɛʁ de ni]) is a commune in the Mayenne department in north-western France.

== Geography ==
The Commune along with another 11 communes shares part of a 5,255 hectare, Natura 2000 conservation area, called the Vallée du Sarthon et affluents.

In addition the Commune along with another 4 communes shares part of a 1,190 hectare, Natura 2000 conservation area, called the Alpes Mancelles.

The Sarthon river flows through the commune.

The commune is made up of the following collection of villages and hamlets, Annette, La Cirardière, Ville Perdue, La Sourdière, La Couaslonnière, La Nouillerie, L'Étang du Tour, Saint-Pierre-des-Nids, Bochard, La Moussardière, La Blanchinière, La Baderie, Champrousier and La Payardière.

The commune is in the Normandie-Maine Regional Natural Park.

== Points of Interest ==
- Cinéma L'Aiglon is a 155 seater cinema run by volunteers that has been operational in the commune since 1946.

=== National Heritage sites ===
The Commune has a total of 2 buildings and areas listed as a Monument historique:

- Château du Plessis-Bochard - an eighteenth century chateaux that was listed as monument historique in 1996.
- Menhir dit La Pierre au Diable - a Neolithic Menhir, that is known as The Devil's Stone was listed as a monument in 1978.

== See also ==
- Communes of the Mayenne department
- Parc naturel régional Normandie-Maine
