= Saint-Mars-du-Désert, Mayenne =

Saint-Mars-du-Désert
- Commune
- Location of Saint-Mars-du-Désert
- Location within France Location within Pays de la Loire
- Coordinates: 48°17′41″N 0°09′27″W
- Country: France
- Region: Pays de la Loire
- Department: Mayenne
- Arrondissement: Mayenne
- Canton: Villaines-la-Juhel
- Intercommunality: CC du Mont des Avaloirs

Government
  - Mayor (2020–2026): Gaspard Saver
- Area^{1}: 11.87 km^{2} (4.58 sq mi)
- Elevation: 271 m (889 ft)
- Highest elevation: 219 m (719 ft)
- Lowest elevation: 107 m (351 ft)
- Population (2023): 162
  - Density: 13.6/km^{2} (35.3/sq mi)
- Time zone: UTC+01:00 (CET)
  - Summer (DST): UTC+02:00 (CEST)
- INSEE/Postal code: 53236 /53700
- ^{1} French Land Register data, which excludes lakes, ponds, glaciers > 1 km^{2} (0.386 sq mi or 247 acres) and river estuaries.

Saint-Mars-du-Désert (French pronunciation: [sɛ̃ maʁ dy dezɛʁ]) is a commune in the Mayenne department in north-western France.

== See also ==
- Communes of the Mayenne department
