= Ravigny =

- Commune
- Coat of arms
- Location of Ravigny
- Location within France Location within Pays de la Loire
- Coordinates: 48°26′53″N 0°03′39″W
- Country: France
- Region: Pays de la Loire
- Department: Mayenne
- Arrondissement: Mayenne
- Canton: Villaines-la-Juhel

Government
  - Mayor (2020–2026): Guy Maignan
- Area^{1}: 6.54 km^{2} (2.53 sq mi)
- Elevation: 95 m (312 ft)
- Highest elevation: 350 m (1,150 ft)
- Lowest elevation: 170 m (560 ft)
- Population (2023): 232
  - Density: 35.5/km^{2} (91.9/sq mi)
- Time zone: UTC+01:00 (CET)
  - Summer (DST): UTC+02:00 (CEST)
- INSEE/Postal code: 53187 /53370
- ^{1} French Land Register data, which excludes lakes, ponds, glaciers > 1 km^{2} (0.386 sq mi or 247 acres) and river estuaries.

Ravigny (French pronunciation: [ʁaviɲi]) is a commune in the Mayenne department in north-western France.

== Geography ==
The commune is made up of the following collection of villages and hamlets, Ravigny, Le Pont-Cel, La Thibaudière, La Chauvellière, La Cellotière and La Roirie.

The commune is in the Normandie-Maine Regional Natural Park.

The Sarthon river and le Chandon are the two watercourses which flow through the commune.

The Commune along with another 11 communes shares part of a 5,255 hectare, Natura 2000 conservation area, called the Vallée du Sarthon et affluents.

== Points of Interest ==
=== National Heritage sites ===
- Manoir à Ravigny - a sixteenth century manor house that was listed as a Monument historique in 1975.

== Notable people ==
- Marcelle Neveu - (1906 – 1993) a middle-distance runner who was born here.

== See also ==
- Communes of Mayenne
- Parc naturel régional Normandie-Maine
