= Laleu, Orne =

Laleu
- Commune
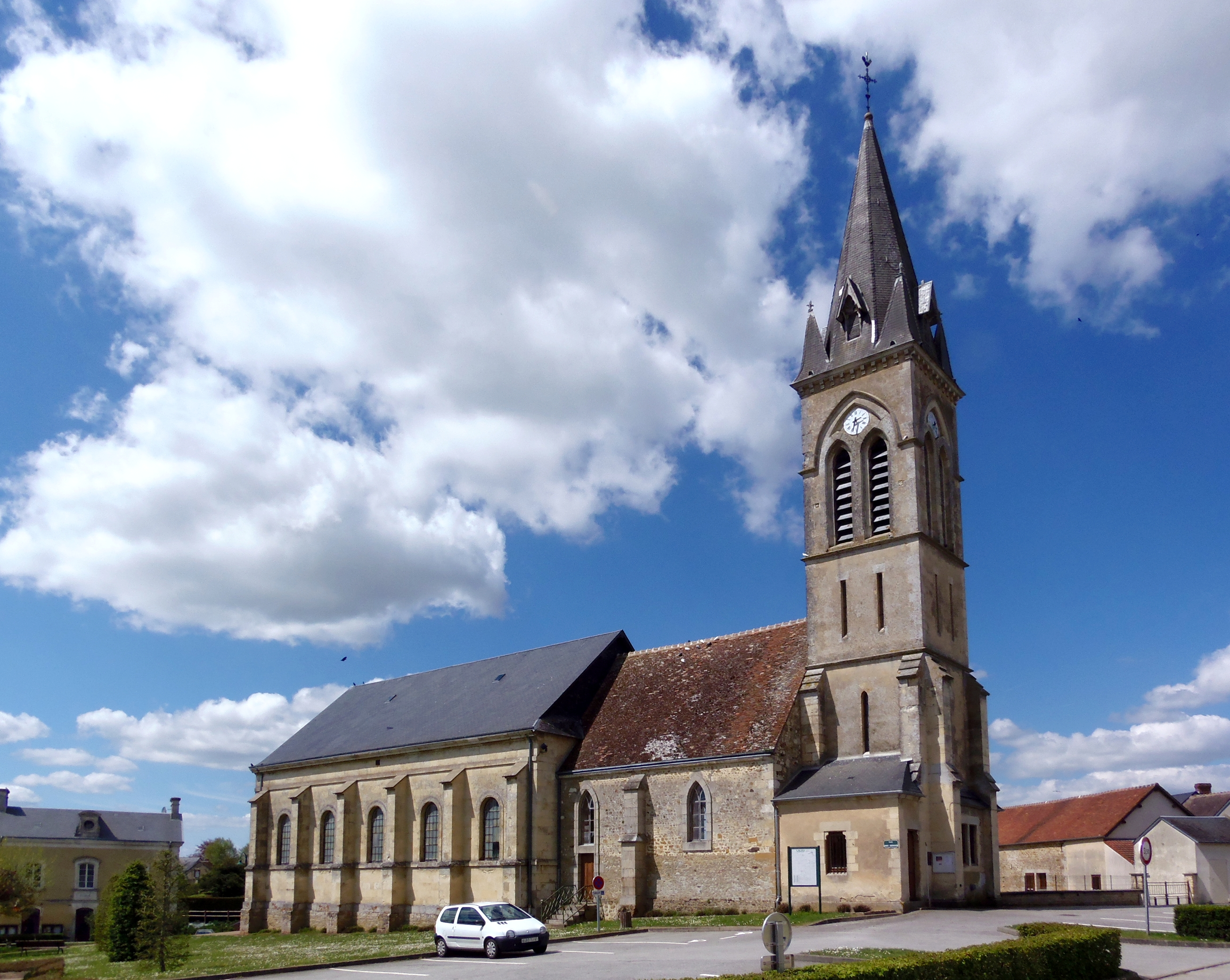
- The church in Laleu
- Location of Laleu
- Location within France Location within Normandy
- Coordinates: 48°33′08″N 0°22′48″E
- Country: France
- Region: Normandy
- Department: Orne
- Arrondissement: Alençon
- Canton: Écouves
- Intercommunality: Vallée de la Haute Sarthe

Government
  - Mayor (2020–2026): Raymond Denis
- Area^{1}: 11.41 km^{2} (4.41 sq mi)
- Elevation: 185 m (607 ft)
- Highest elevation: 214 m (702 ft)
- Lowest elevation: 148 m (486 ft)
- Population (2023): 362
  - Density: 31.7/km^{2} (82.2/sq mi)
- Time zone: UTC+01:00 (CET)
  - Summer (DST): UTC+02:00 (CEST)
- INSEE/Postal code: 61215 /61170
- ^{1} French Land Register data, which excludes lakes, ponds, glaciers > 1 km^{2} (0.386 sq mi or 247 acres) and river estuaries.

Laleu (French pronunciation: [lalø]) is a commune in the Orne department in north-western France.

== Geography ==
Laleu is made up of the following collection of villages and hamlets, Laleu and Bois Gallais.

The commune along with another 32 communes is part of a 3,503 hectare, Natura 2000 conservation area, called the Haute vallée de la Sarthe.

The commune is in the Normandie-Maine Regional Natural Park.

The Sarthe river flows through the commune. Two other watercourses, Le Villedieu and Le Quincampoix also pass through the commune.

== Population ==
Historical population
Year	Pop.	±% p.a.
1968	335	—
1975	347	+0.50%
1982	327	−0.84%
1990	361	+1.24%
1999	343	−0.57%
2007	375	+1.12%
2012	362	−0.70%
2017	360	−0.11%
2023	362	+0.09%
Source: INSEE

== See also ==
- Communes of the Orne department
- Normandie-Maine Regional Natural Park
