= Oppidum of Moulay =

Iron Age settlement in Pays de la Loire, France

Excavations took place at the oppidum de Moulay or oppidum du Mesnil, an oppidum in the commune of Moulay in the Mayenne in the Pays de la Loire region between 1972 and 1975, when the commune was subdivided. The excavation of the first rampart uncovered suggestions an area of 12 hectares, as well as a number of artifacts now exhibited at the Musée archéologique départemental de Jublains. On 26 May 1986, the site was declared a monument historique.

In 2004, road construction in Moulay and Mayenne uncovered a second rampart 1,200 meters long. The total area of the enclosure is 135 hectares, making it one of the ten largest oppida in France and the largest on the Armorican Massif. An 11-hectare excavation ended in June 2011.

== Location ==
Gaulois peoples of what is now northwestern France

The location of Moulay favored settlement there. At the confluence of the Mayenne and the Aron rivers, whose rugged valleys outline a trapezoid, it apparently guarded access to a ford over the Mayenne.

== First excavations ==
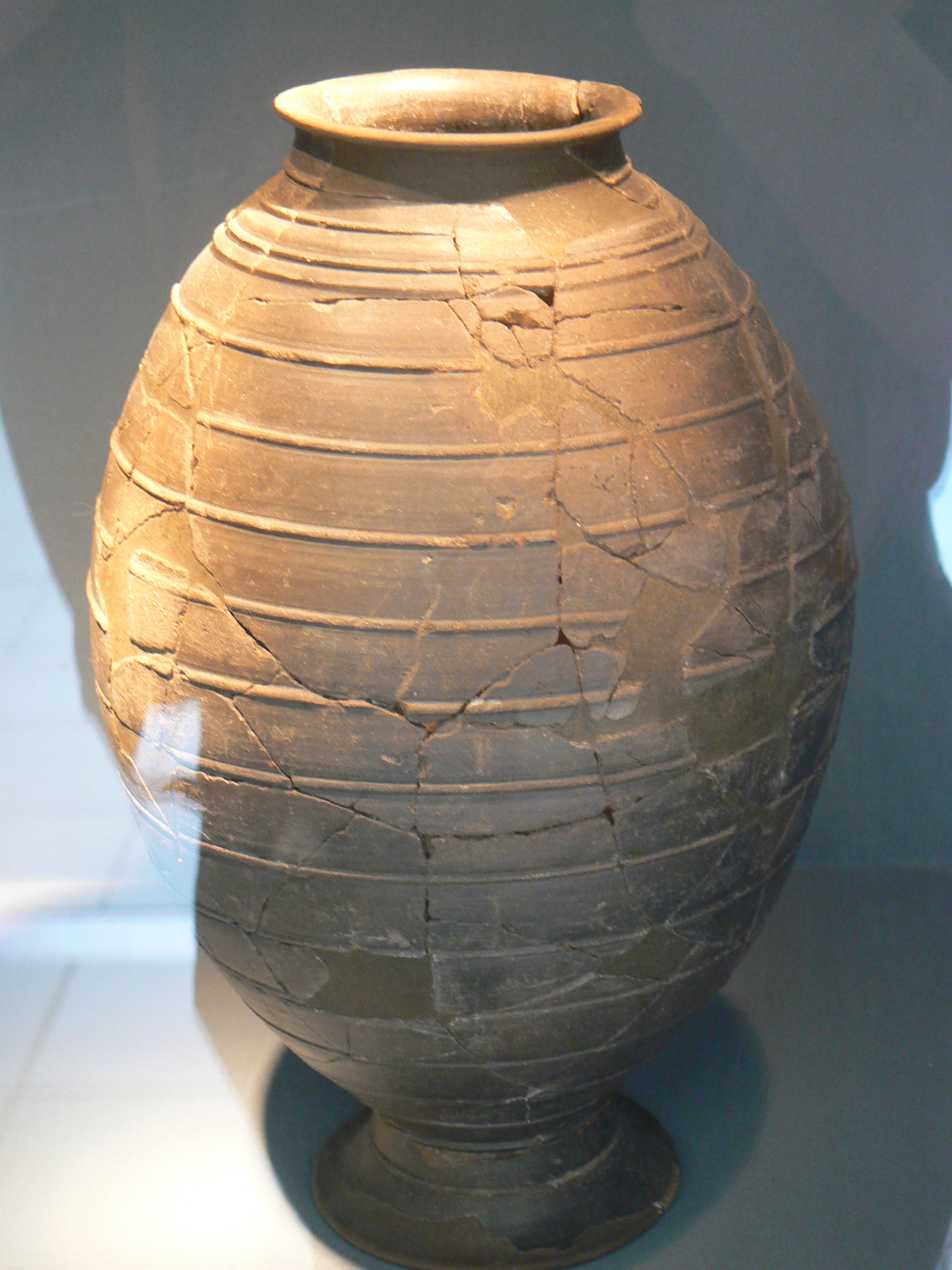
Pottery decorated with cordons, second half of the first century BCE.

The site has long been known as "Camp de César", (Caesar's Camp), even though a preliminary excavation between 1972 and 1975 determined that its origins were Gaulish. It also brought to light a murus gallicus type defensive wall surrounding an area of twelve hectares.

=== First rampart ===
The first rampart, 370 m long, initially was six meters high and 20 meters wide, preceded by a ditch. To the north, a postern gate with a dry stone wall three meters thick overlooks the site.

=== Inside the first wall ===
Excavations inside the first wall found little beyond hearths and a few sparse items. Some of these were linked to bronze handicrafts: molds for bracelets and lapilli. Also, a lovely pottery vase decorated with cordons was discovered, of a type known in Armorica, and whose clay came from present-day Lamballe. Apart from the furniture, dated to the end of the Gaulish era, wattle and daub elements have been found.

More than 200 grindstones were discovered 800 meters from the first enclosure, dating from the late La Tène period.

== Discovery of the second enclosure ==
A diagnostic excavation in 2004 prior to the construction of a detour identified a second rampart 1,000 m from the first, also known as the rempart du Petit Mesnil, a murus gallicus, 2.50 m high. The estimated footprint of the oppidum was revised upward to 135 hectares, and the site seemed related to the barred spur type, with multiple bars.

=== Excavation ===
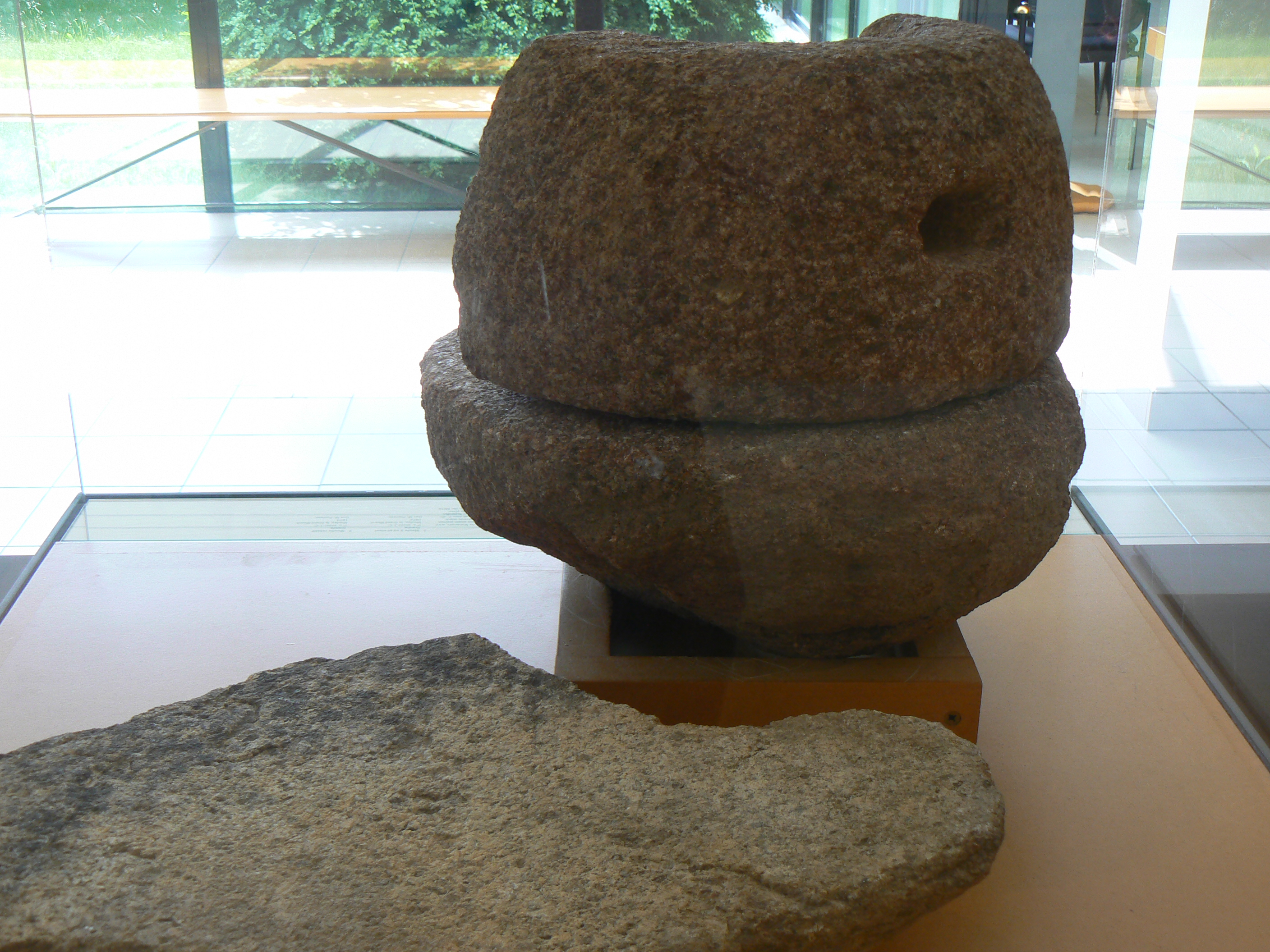
Grindstones discovered in Moulay in the 1970s in excavations by Jacques Naveau. Musée archéologique départemental de Jublains

A team of 29 archaeologists took over. The archaeological work at the oppidum was to finish up in mid-2011 then for another eight months excavate two farms.

The second phase of the excavations st this site was authorized and funded in part through the framework of the French 2008-2009 economic stimulus plan.

=== Excavations ===
The oppidum was no doubt the capital of the Aulerques Diablintes in the 1 first and second century BCE. Besides the oppodium wall, two Gaulish farms have been identified, one in Moulay, the other in Aron. Preliminary results of excavation indicate but do not quite prove the hypothesis of a densely occupied space, of 80 hectares or possibly even larger, The oppidum is organised orthogonally into residential neighborhoods and artisanal and religious land uses. The residential enclosures mostly consist of a house and a storehouse, and are delimited by ditches. An artisanal and commercial quarter occupied the centre of the oppidum enclosure.

Water supply points and a sewer network have been uncovered. The space between the first and second walls may have been caused by an expansion of the settlement in the 1st century BCE. No trace of destruction, violence or sudden abandonment explains the depopulation of this site, in the centre of a territory as large as a modern département, surrounded by secondary centers such as Entrammes and Jublains.

== Interpretation ==
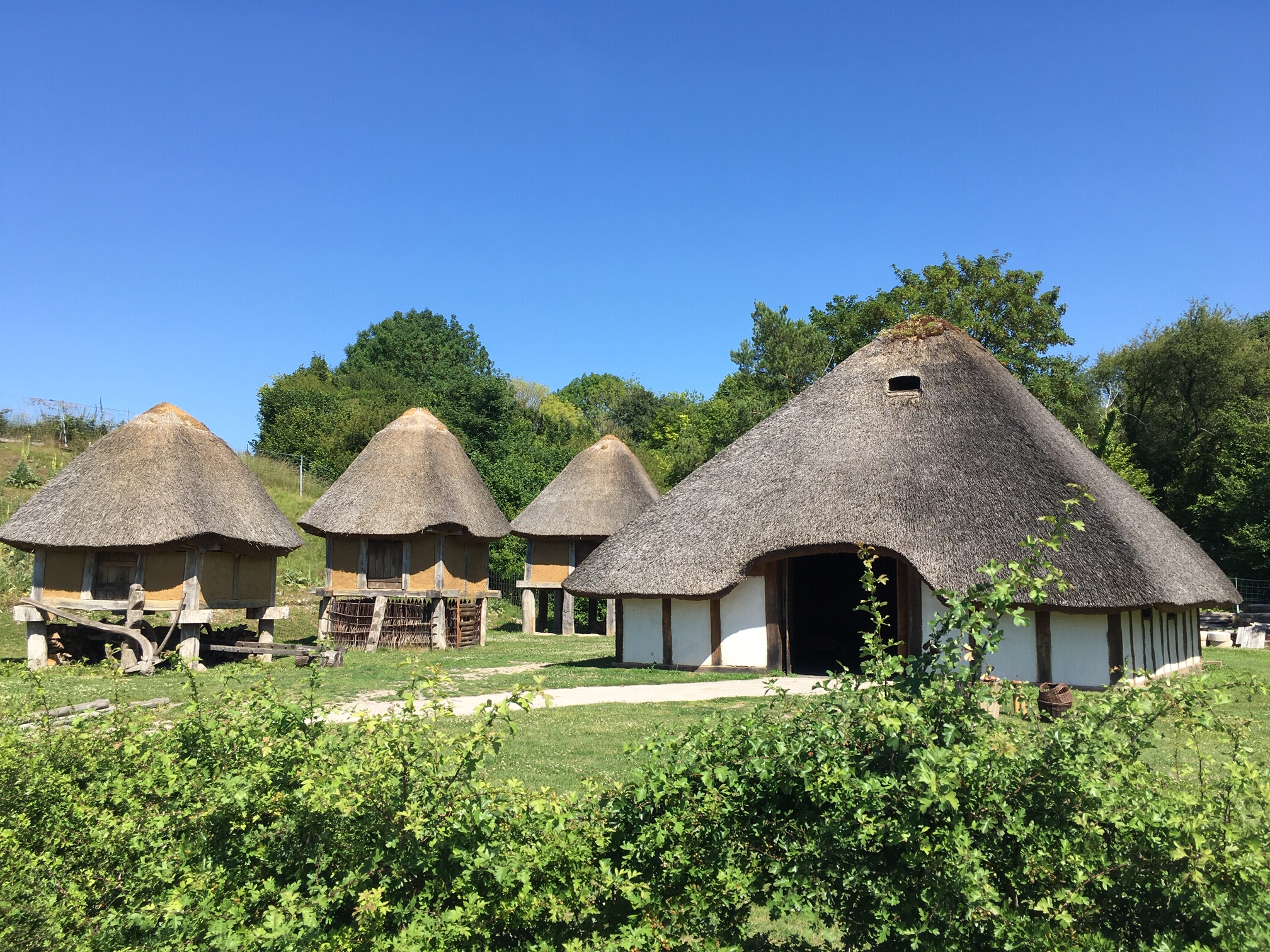
Reconstructed Gallic house and granaries

The dating and function of the first enclosure are difficult to understand, particularly with respect to its relationship to the second; perhaps a matter for future research.

The site was abandoned in the Roman era in favor of Jublains; there is no evidence of violence or a fire. The site was developed in a planned manner, which implies a local élite. Moulay constitutes the largest fortified settlement in the area, according to E. Le Goff. Surrounded by secondary centers, among which may have been Jublains, Moulay also seemed to Le Goff to have been the heart of a powerful political system.

== Gallery ==
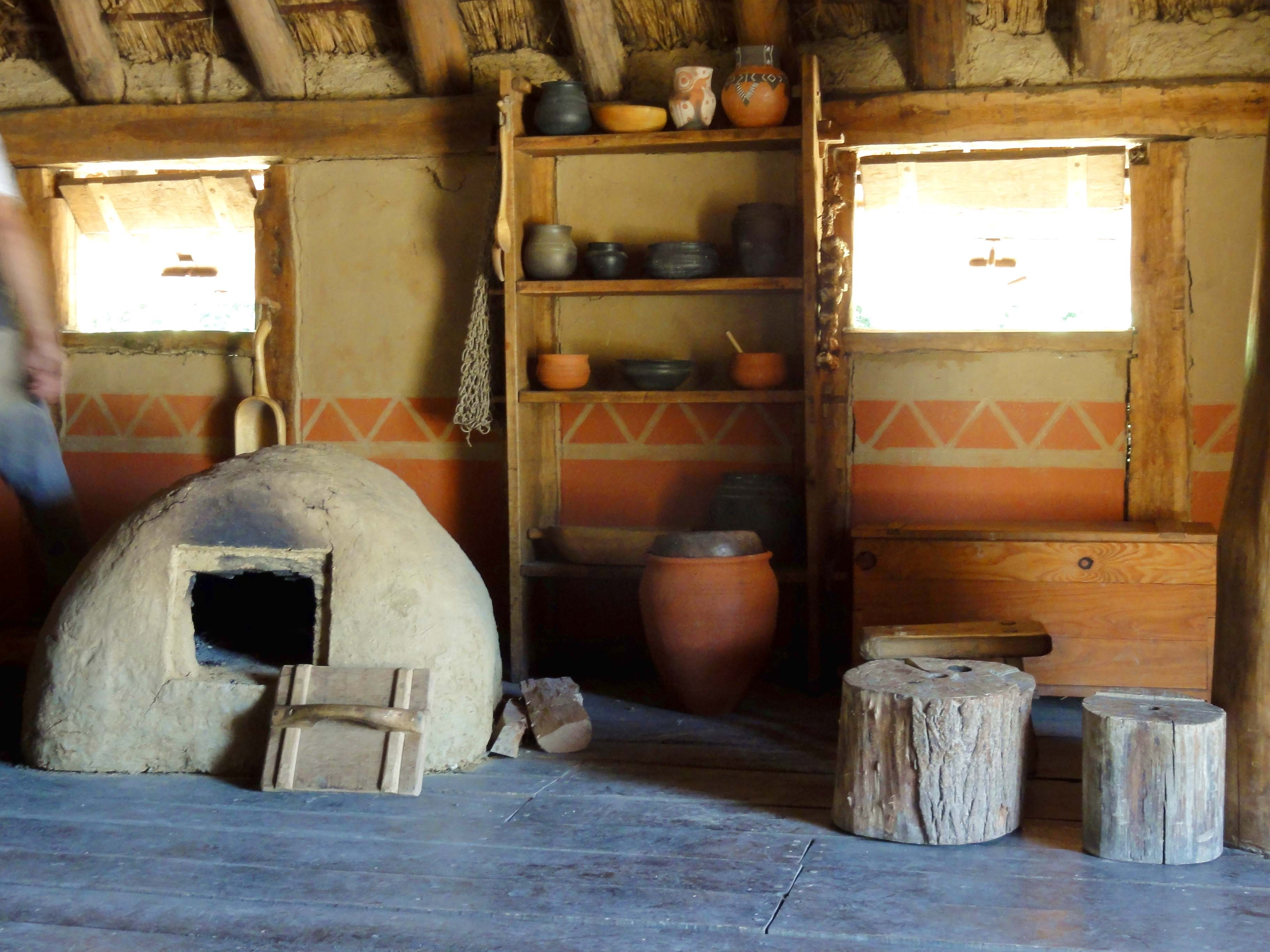
Reconstructed house interior

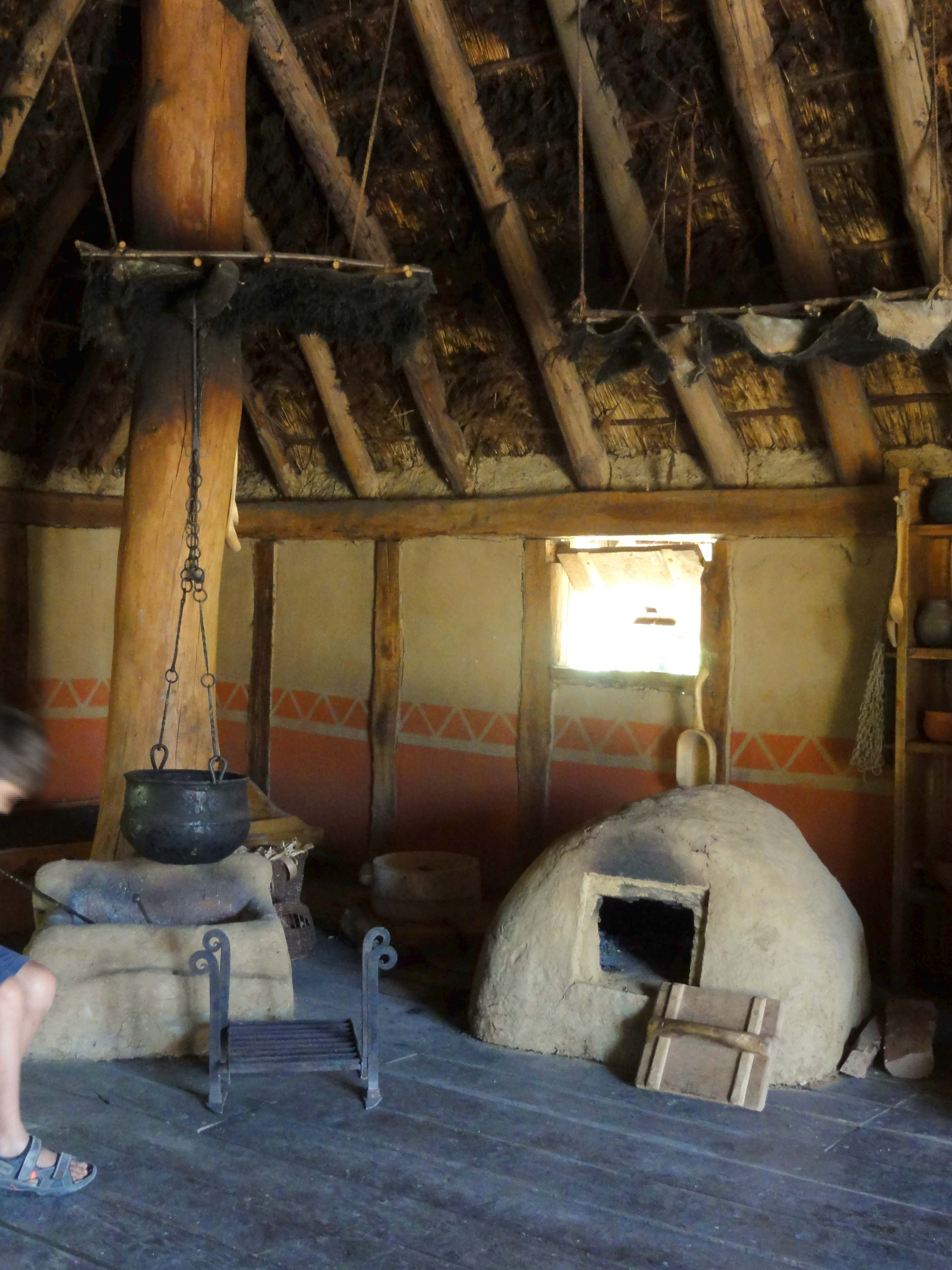
Reconstructed house interior

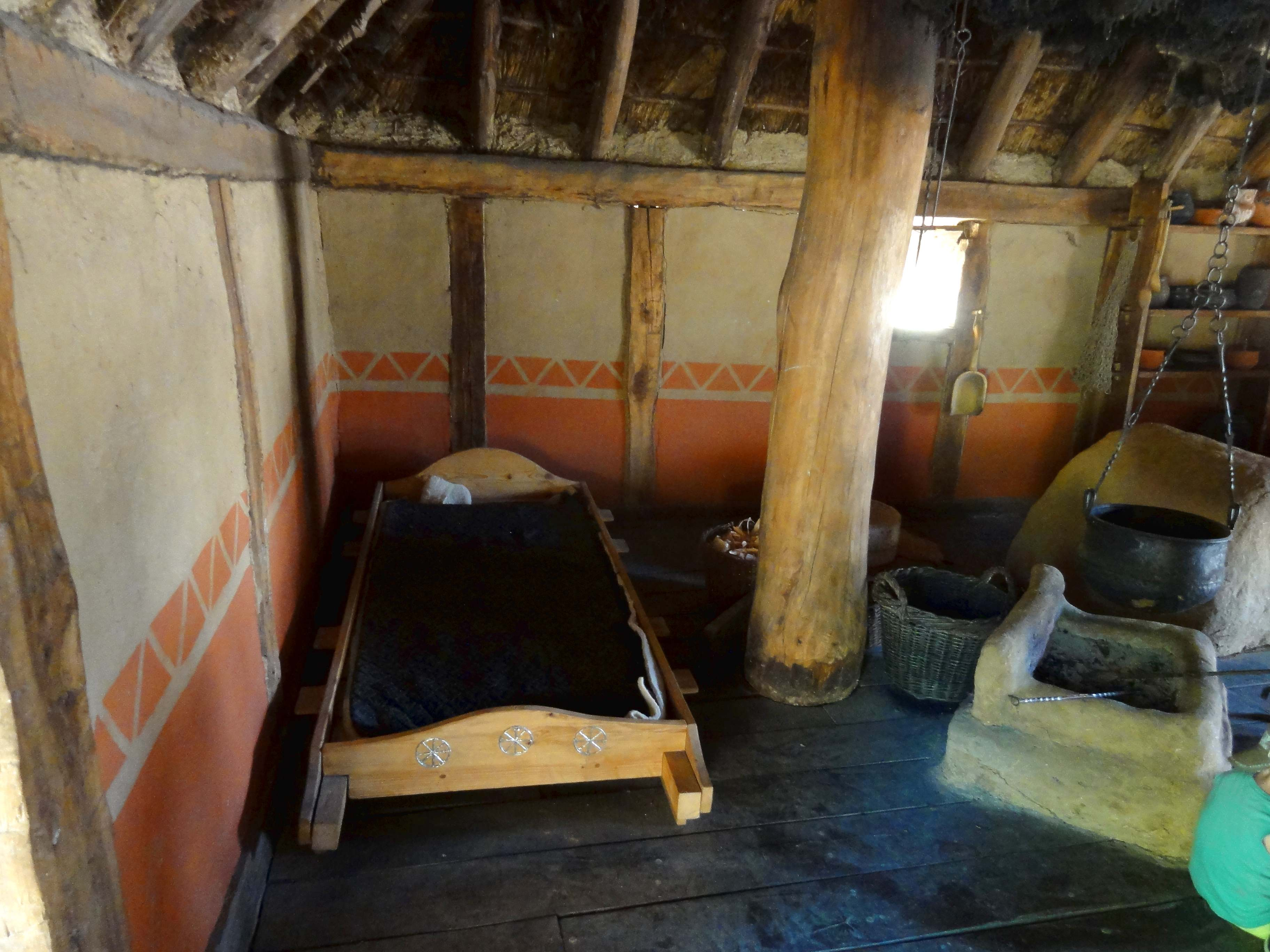
Reconstructed house interior

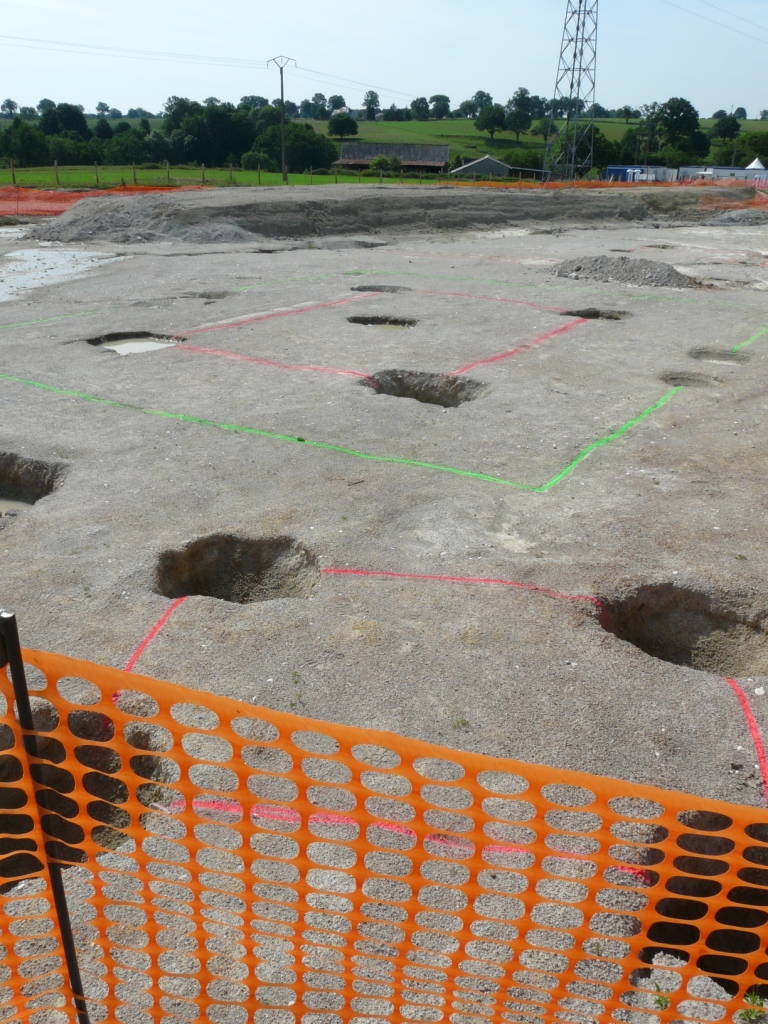
Post holes.

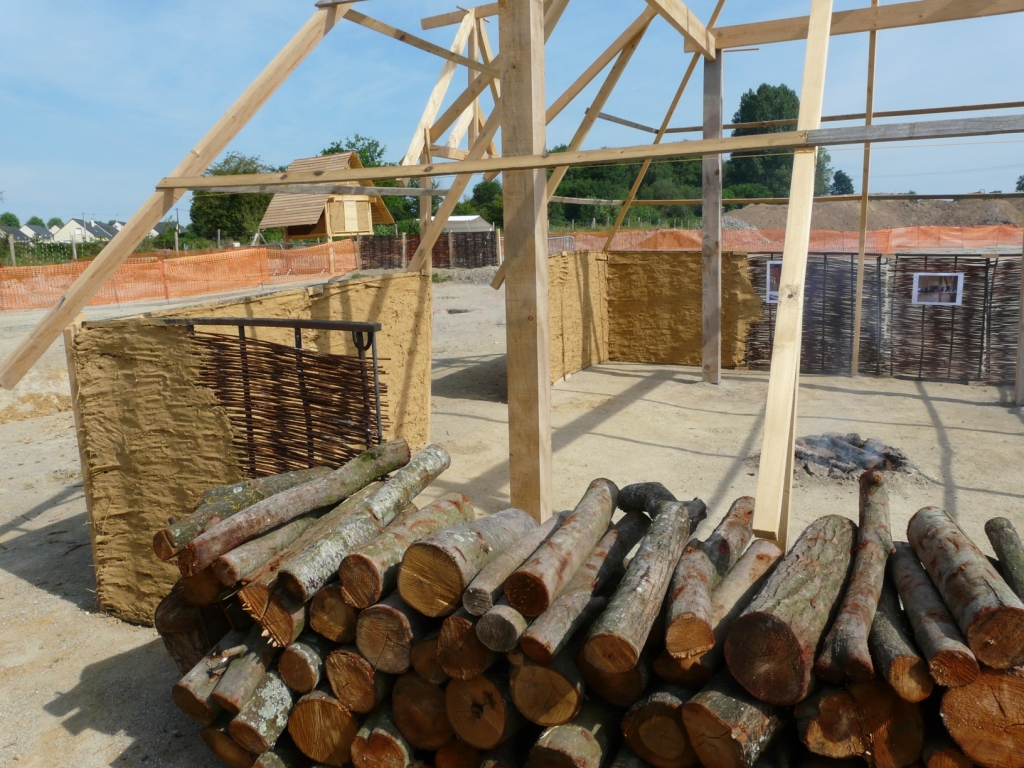
Reconstitution of a Gaulish dwelling.

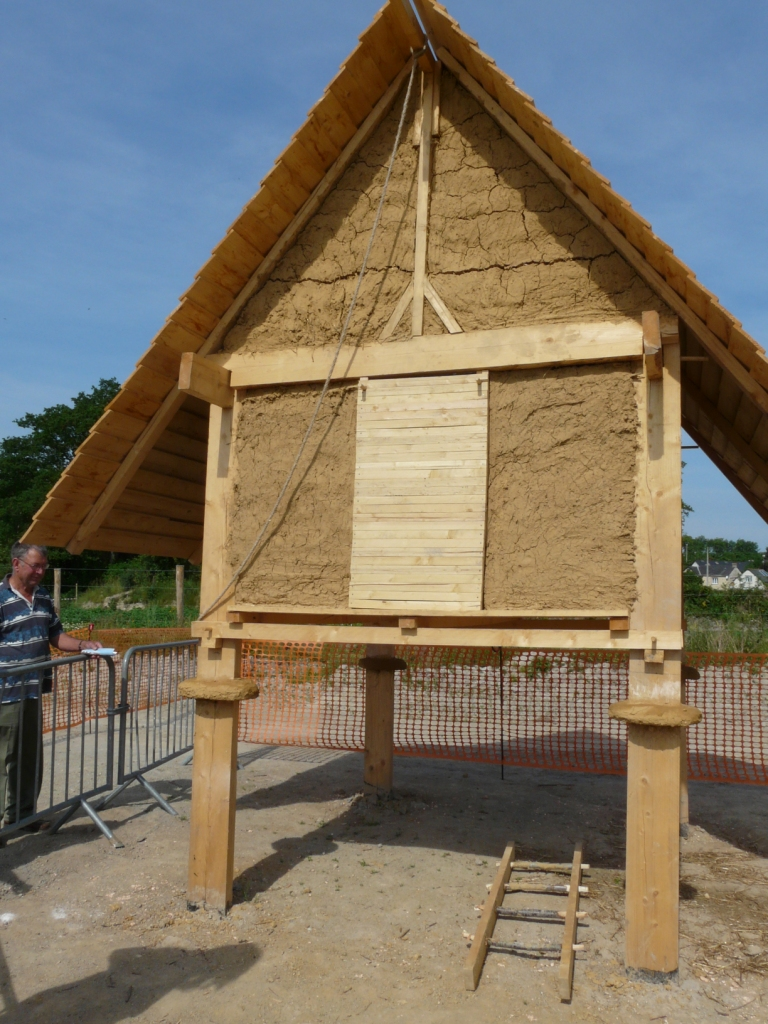
Reconstruction of a Gaulish storehouse.
