= Saint-Jean-sur-Erve =

- Part of Blandouet-Saint Jean
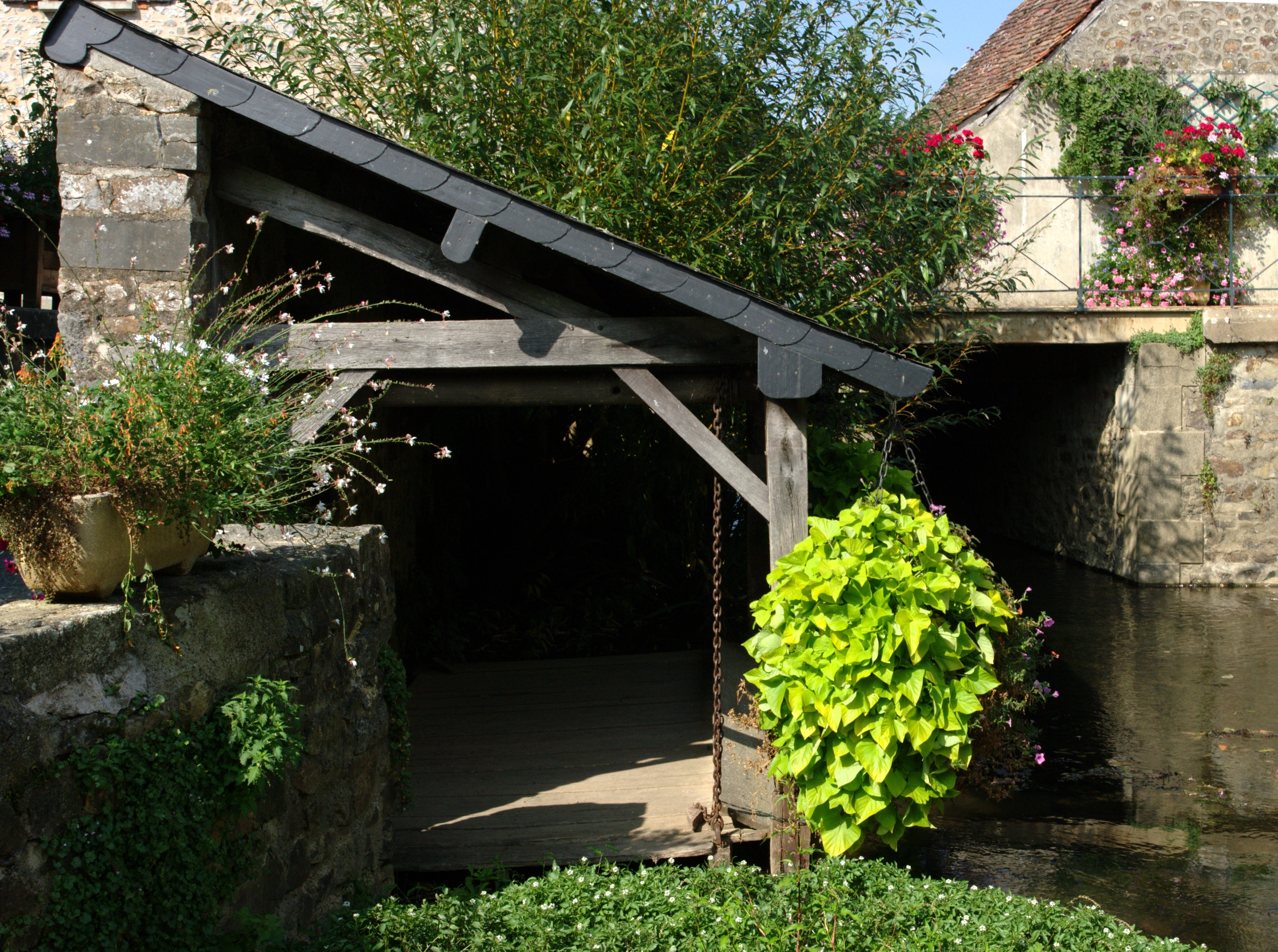
- The washing house in Saint-Jean-sur-Erve
- Location of Saint-Jean-sur-Erve
- Location within France Location within Pays de la Loire
- Coordinates: 48°02′07″N 0°23′26″W
- Country: France
- Region: Pays de la Loire
- Department: Mayenne
- Arrondissement: Mayenne
- Canton: Meslay-du-Maine
- Commune: Blandouet-Saint Jean
- Area^{1}: 25.39 km^{2} (9.80 sq mi)
- Elevation: 70 m (230 ft)
- Highest elevation: 119 m (390 ft)
- Lowest elevation: 58 m (190 ft)
- Population (2022): 374
  - Density: 14.7/km^{2} (38.2/sq mi)
- Time zone: UTC+01:00 (CET)
  - Summer (DST): UTC+02:00 (CEST)
- Postal code: 53270
- ^{1} French Land Register data, which excludes lakes, ponds, glaciers > 1 km^{2} (0.386 sq mi or 247 acres) and river estuaries.

Saint-Jean-sur-Erve (French pronunciation: [sɛ̃ ʒɑ̃ syʁ ɛʁv]) is a former commune in the Mayenne department in north-western France. On 1 January 2017, it was merged into the new commune Blandouet-Saint Jean.

== See also ==
- Communes of the Mayenne department
