= La Haie =

La Haie may refer to:

- La Haie, Lasne, an alternative spelling of La Haye, Lasne in Belgium; a farmhouse on the left flank of Wellington's position at the Battle of Waterloo
- La Haie-Fouassière (also spelled: La Haye-Fouassière) is a commune in the Loire-Atlantique department in western France
- La Haie-Traversaine, a commune in the Mayenne department in north-western France
- Saint-Nicolas-de-la-Haie, a commune in the Seine-Maritime department in the Haute-Normandie region in northern France

== See also ==
- La Haye Sainte, a farmhouse, in the centre of Wellington's position at the Battle of Waterloo
