= Blandouet =

Commune in Mayenne, France

- Part of Blandouet-Saint Jean
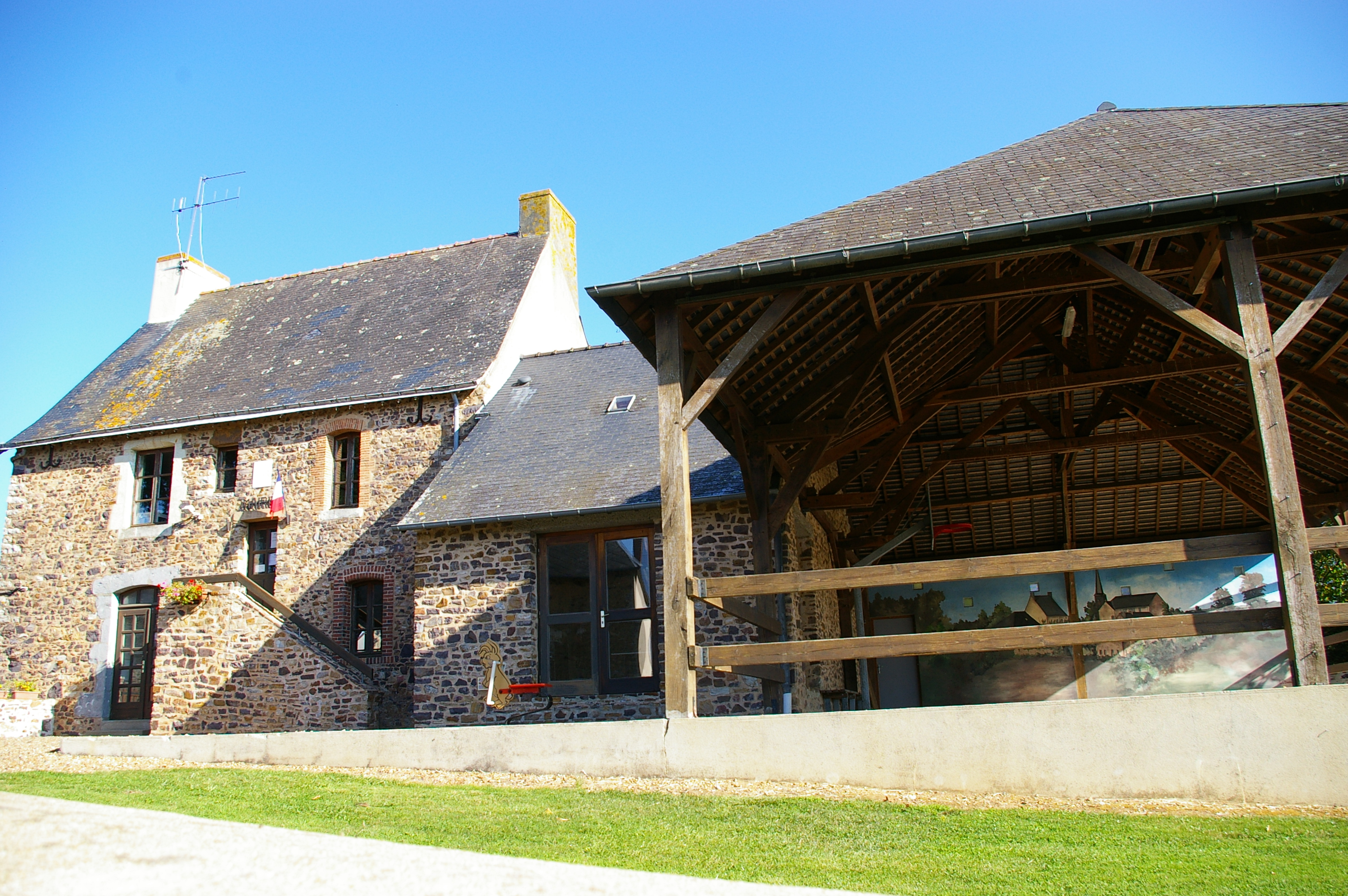
- The town hall in Blandouet

- Coat of arms
- Location of Blandouet
- Location within France Location within Pays de la Loire
- Coordinates: 48°03′07″N 0°19′39″W
- Country: France
- Region: Pays de la Loire
- Department: Mayenne
- Arrondissement: Laval
- Canton: Meslay-du-Maine
- Commune: Blandouet-Saint Jean
- Area^{1}: 11.33 km^{2} (4.37 sq mi)
- Elevation: 160 m (520 ft)
- Highest elevation: 225 m (738 ft)
- Lowest elevation: 88 m (289 ft)
- Population (2023): 181
  - Density: 16.0/km^{2} (41.4/sq mi)
- Time zone: UTC+01:00 (CET)
  - Summer (DST): UTC+02:00 (CEST)
- Postal code: 53270
- ^{1} French Land Register data, which excludes lakes, ponds, glaciers > 1 km^{2} (0.386 sq mi or 247 acres) and river estuaries.

Blandouet is a former commune in the Mayenne department in northwestern France. On 1 January 2017, it was merged into the new commune Blandouet-Saint Jean.

== See also ==
- Communes of Mayenne
