= Le Horps =

- Commune
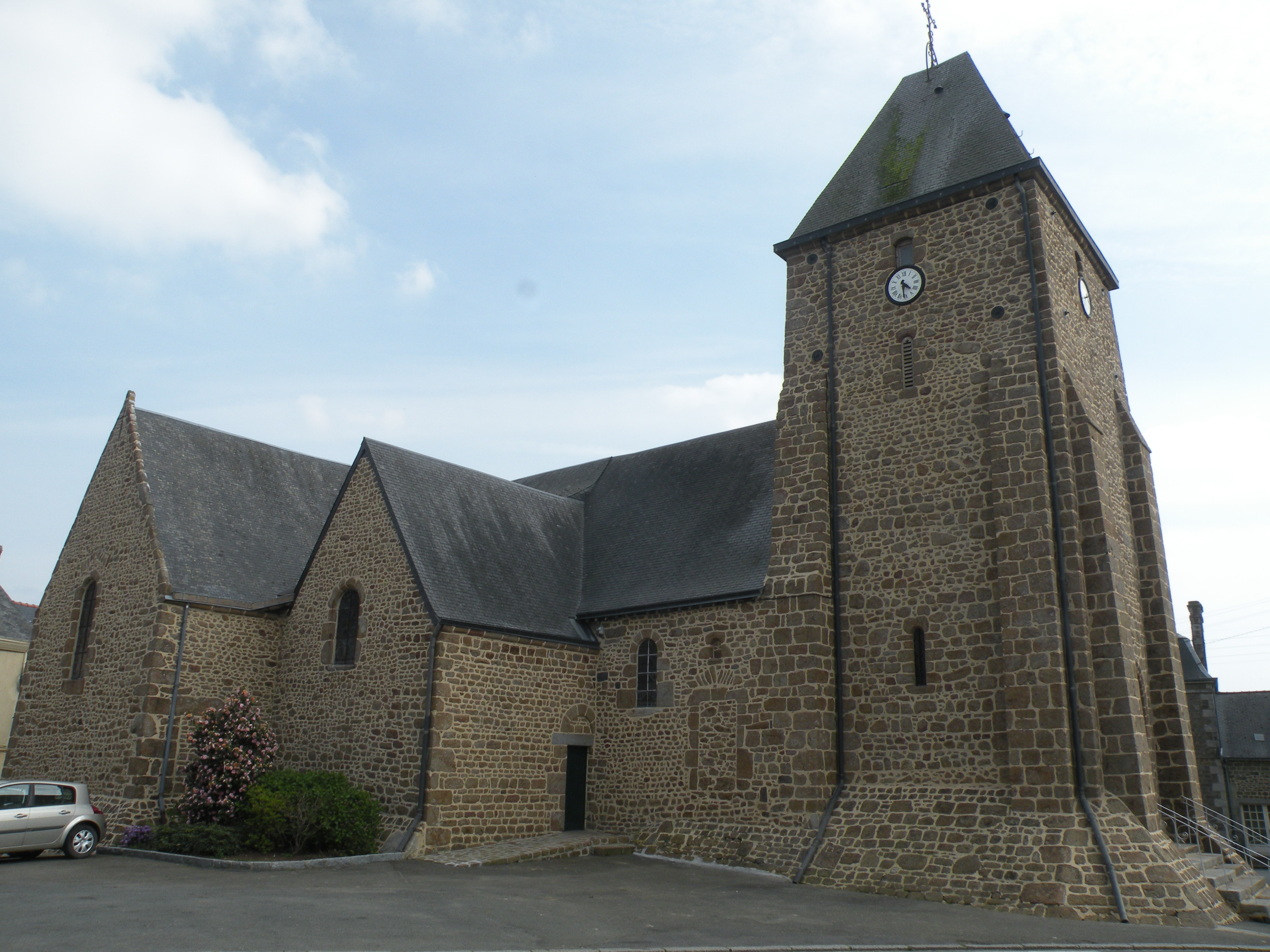
- The church of Saint Pierre and Saint Paul, in Le Horps
- Location of Le Horps
- Location within France Location within Pays de la Loire
- Coordinates: 48°23′50″N 0°27′36″W
- Country: France
- Region: Pays de la Loire
- Department: Mayenne
- Arrondissement: Mayenne
- Canton: Lassay-les-Châteaux

Government
  - Mayor (2020–2026): Patrick Soutif
- Area^{1}: 23.27 km^{2} (8.98 sq mi)
- Elevation: 270 m (890 ft)
- Highest elevation: 301 m (988 ft)
- Lowest elevation: 174 m (571 ft)
- Population (2023): 716
  - Density: 30.8/km^{2} (79.7/sq mi)
- Time zone: UTC+01:00 (CET)
  - Summer (DST): UTC+02:00 (CEST)
- INSEE/Postal code: 53116 /53640
- ^{1} French Land Register data, which excludes lakes, ponds, glaciers > 1 km^{2} (0.386 sq mi or 247 acres) and river estuaries.

Le Horps (French pronunciation: [lə ɔʁ]) is a commune in the Mayenne department in north-western France.

== Geography ==
The commune is made up of the following collection of villages and hamlets, Le Bois Richard, La Brunelière, Le Guiboux, Le Horps, Le Houssel, La Rebourgère and Ricordeau.

== Demography ==
Historical population

Year	Pop.	±% p.a.
1793	1,567	—
1806	1,729	+0.76%
1821	1,631	−0.39%
1836	1,682	+0.21%
1846	1,564	−0.72%
1856	1,583	+0.12%
1866	1,634	+0.32%
1876	1,584	−0.31%
1886	1,454	−0.85%
1896	1,336	−0.84%
1906	1,245	−0.70%
1921	1,048	−1.14%
1931	953	−0.95%

Year	Pop.	±% p.a.
1946	935	−0.13%
1954	904	−0.42%
1962	836	−0.97%
1968	735	−2.12%
1975	707	−0.55%
1982	671	−0.74%
1990	684	+0.24%
1999	734	+0.79%
2007	758	+0.40%
2012	772	+0.37%
2017	744	−0.74%
2023	716	−0.64%

Source: EHESS and INSEE

== See also ==
- Communes of the Mayenne department
