= Le Housseau-Brétignolles =

- Commune
- Location of Le Housseau-Brétignolles
- Location within France Location within Pays de la Loire
- Coordinates: 48°28′09″N 0°31′14″W
- Country: France
- Region: Pays de la Loire
- Department: Mayenne
- Arrondissement: Mayenne
- Canton: Lassay-les-Châteaux

Government
  - Mayor (2020–2026): Jean-Paul Coisnon
- Area^{1}: 9.31 km^{2} (3.59 sq mi)
- Elevation: 194 m (636 ft)
- Highest elevation: 212 m (696 ft)
- Lowest elevation: 104 m (341 ft)
- Population (2023): 231
  - Density: 24.8/km^{2} (64.3/sq mi)
- Time zone: UTC+01:00 (CET)
  - Summer (DST): UTC+02:00 (CEST)
- INSEE/Postal code: 53118 /53110
- ^{1} French Land Register data, which excludes lakes, ponds, glaciers > 1 km^{2} (0.386 sq mi or 247 acres) and river estuaries.

Le Housseau-Brétignolles (French pronunciation: [lə uso bʁetiɲɔl]) is a commune in the Mayenne department in north-western France.

== Geography ==
The commune is made up of the following collection of villages and hamlets, Marcent, Remieu, Brétignolles-le-Moulin and Le Housseau-Brétignolles.

The Mayenne river flows through the commune.

The commune is located within the Normandie-Maine Regional Natural Park.

== See also ==
- Communes of the Mayenne department
- Parc naturel régional Normandie-Maine
