= Blandouet-Saint Jean =

- Commune
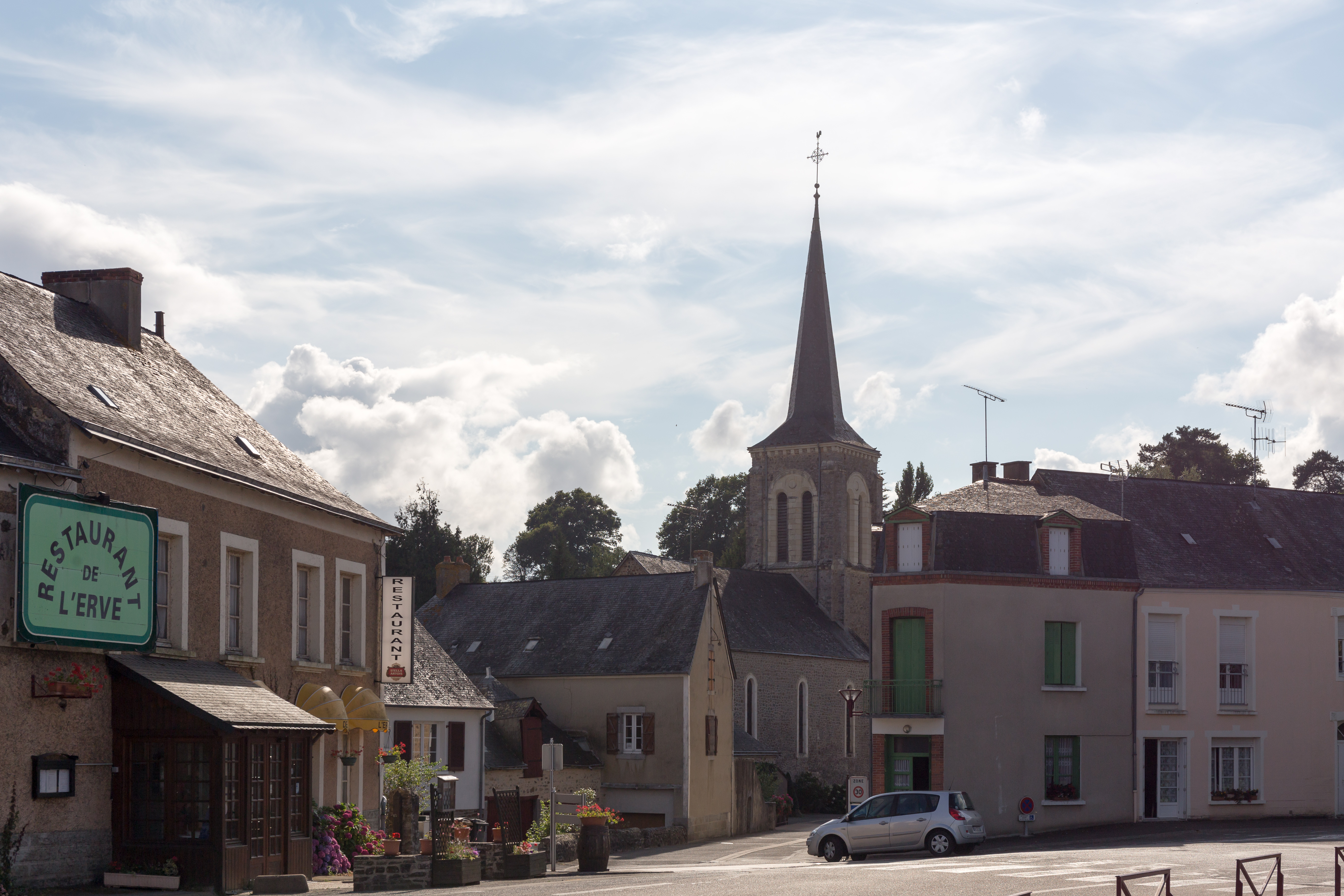
- A general view of Saint-Jean-sur-Erve
- Location of Blandouet-Saint Jean
- Location within France Location within Pays de la Loire
- Coordinates: 48°02′02″N 0°23′31″W
- Country: France
- Region: Pays de la Loire
- Department: Mayenne
- Arrondissement: Mayenne
- Canton: Meslay-du-Maine
- Intercommunality: Coëvrons

Government
  - Mayor (2020–2026): Patrick Cousin
- Area^{1}: 36.72 km^{2} (14.18 sq mi)
- Population (2023): 554
  - Density: 15.1/km^{2} (39.1/sq mi)
- Time zone: UTC+01:00 (CET)
  - Summer (DST): UTC+02:00 (CEST)
- INSEE/Postal code: 53228 /53270
- ^{1} French Land Register data, which excludes lakes, ponds, glaciers > 1 km^{2} (0.386 sq mi or 247 acres) and river estuaries.

Blandouet-Saint Jean (French pronunciation: [blɑ̃dwɛ sɛ̃ ʒɑ̃]) is a commune in the department of Mayenne, western France. The municipality was established on 1 January 2017 by merger of the former communes of Saint-Jean-sur-Erve (the seat) and Blandouet.

== See also ==
- Communes of the Mayenne department
