= Champéon =

- Commune
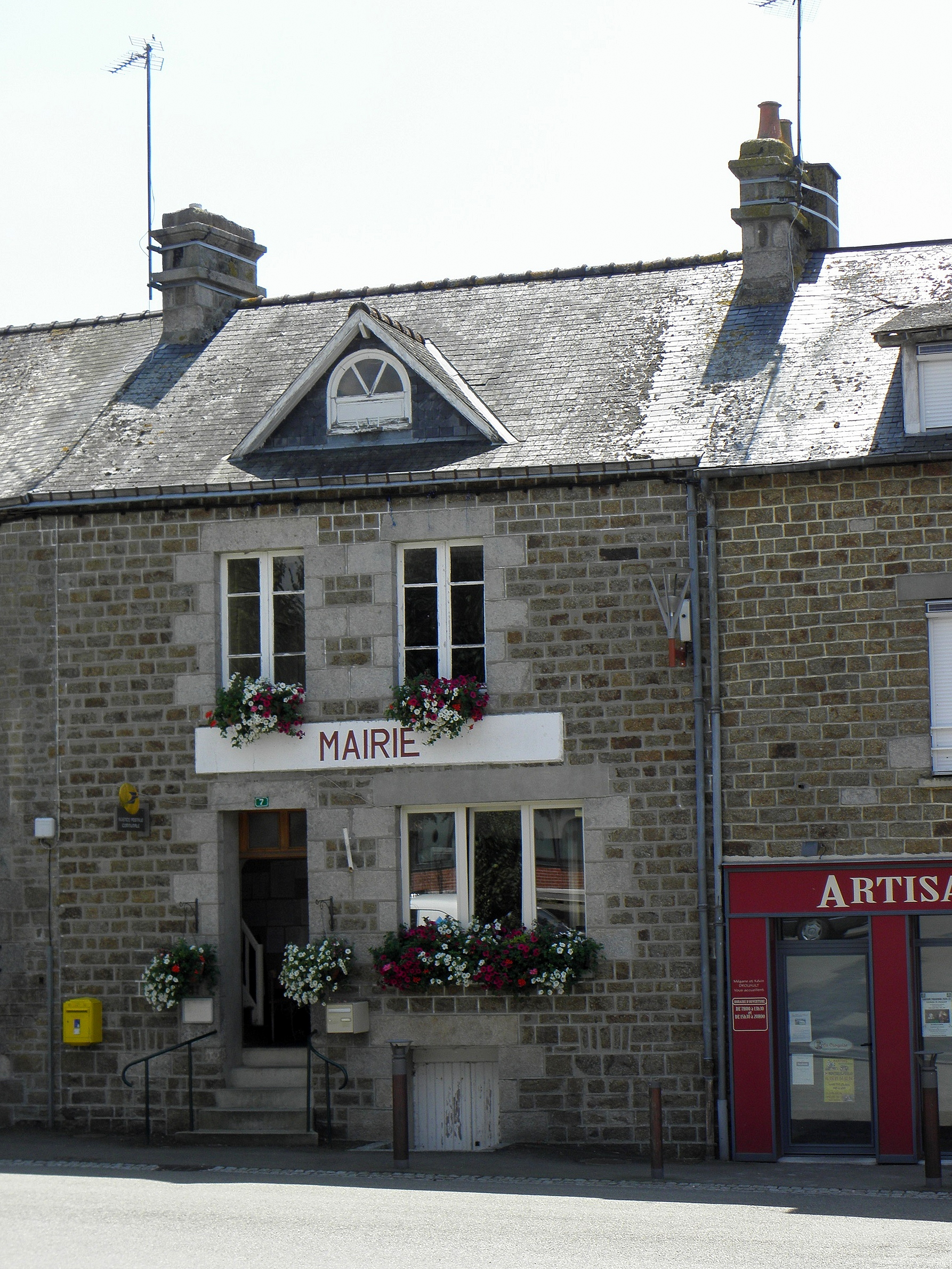
- Champéon Town hall
- Location of Champéon
- Location within France Location within Pays de la Loire
- Coordinates: 48°22′05″N 0°30′59″W
- Country: France
- Region: Pays de la Loire
- Department: Mayenne
- Arrondissement: Mayenne
- Canton: Lassay-les-Châteaux

Government
  - Mayor (2020–2026): Christian Sabran
- Area^{1}: 21.15 km^{2} (8.17 sq mi)
- Elevation: 280 m (920 ft)
- Highest elevation: 292 m (958 ft)
- Lowest elevation: 114 m (374 ft)
- Population (2023): 636
  - Density: 30.1/km^{2} (77.9/sq mi)
- Time zone: UTC+01:00 (CET)
  - Summer (DST): UTC+02:00 (CEST)
- INSEE/Postal code: 53051 /53640
- ^{1} French Land Register data, which excludes lakes, ponds, glaciers > 1 km^{2} (0.386 sq mi or 247 acres) and river estuaries.

Champéon (French pronunciation: [ʃɑ̃peɔ̃]) is a commune in the Mayenne department in north-western France.

== Geography ==
The commune is made up of the following collection of villages and hamlets, Le Four Coupé, Champéon, Churin, Le Bourgneuf and La Maurière.

The source of the river l'Aisne is in this commune.

== Points of Interest ==
- Ferme pédagogique Pat'afoin - is an educational animal farm and sanctionary for rescued animals. The seven acre site was opened in 2020 and is open for public viewings.

=== National Heritage sites ===
The Commune has a total of 2 buildings and areas listed as a Monument historique:

- Château du Fresne - a sixteenth century chateau built in 1589 was listed as a monument historique in 1986.
- Château des Vaux - a fourteenth century chateau which was listed as a monument historique in 1984.

== See also ==
- Communes of Mayenne
