= La Chapelle-au-Riboul =

- Commune
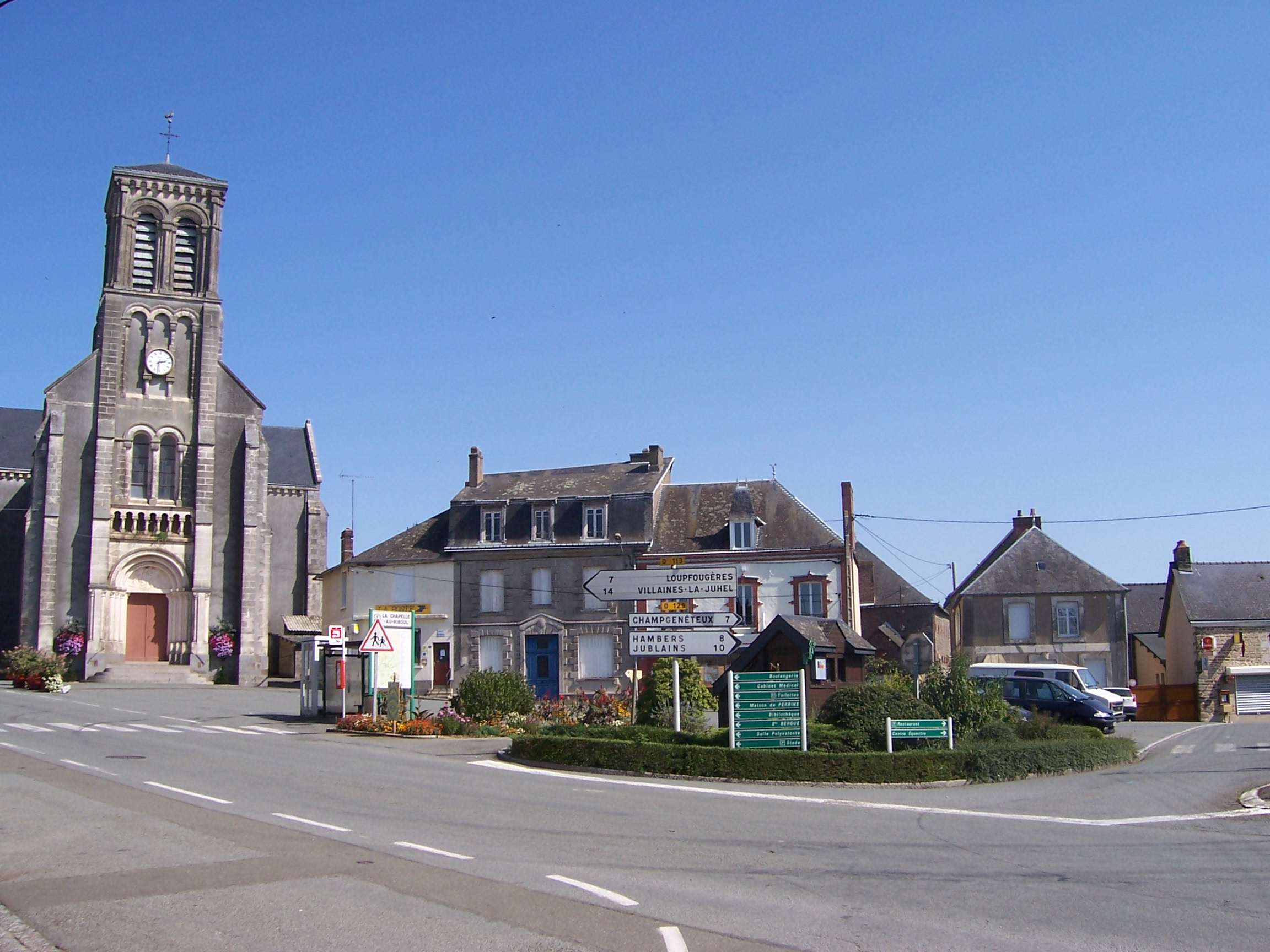
- The church square in La Chapelle-au-Riboul
- Location of La Chapelle-au-Riboul
- Location within France Location within Pays de la Loire
- Coordinates: 48°19′10″N 0°25′57″W
- Country: France
- Region: Pays de la Loire
- Department: Mayenne
- Arrondissement: Mayenne
- Canton: Lassay-les-Châteaux

Government
  - Mayor (2020–2026): Jérôme Harault
- Area^{1}: 13.1 km^{2} (5.1 sq mi)
- Elevation: 160 m (520 ft)
- Highest elevation: 255 m (837 ft)
- Lowest elevation: 137 m (449 ft)
- Population (2023): 505
  - Density: 38.5/km^{2} (99.8/sq mi)
- Time zone: UTC+01:00 (CET)
  - Summer (DST): UTC+02:00 (CEST)
- INSEE/Postal code: 53057 /53440
- ^{1} French Land Register data, which excludes lakes, ponds, glaciers > 1 km^{2} (0.386 sq mi or 247 acres) and river estuaries.

La Chapelle-au-Riboul (French pronunciation: [la ʃapɛl o ʁibul]) is a commune in the Mayenne department and Pays de la Loire region of France.

== See also ==
- Communes of the Mayenne department
