= Montreuil-Poulay =

- Commune
- Location of Montreuil-Poulay
- Location within France Location within Pays de la Loire
- Coordinates: 48°22′59″N 0°31′23″W
- Country: France
- Region: Pays de la Loire
- Department: Mayenne
- Arrondissement: Mayenne
- Canton: Lassay-les-Châteaux

Government
  - Mayor (2020–2026): Roger Garnier
- Area^{1}: 16.24 km^{2} (6.27 sq mi)
- Elevation: 126 m (413 ft)
- Highest elevation: 296 m (971 ft)
- Lowest elevation: 119 m (390 ft)
- Population (2023): 373
  - Density: 23.0/km^{2} (59.5/sq mi)
- Time zone: UTC+01:00 (CET)
  - Summer (DST): UTC+02:00 (CEST)
- INSEE/Postal code: 53160 /53640
- ^{1} French Land Register data, which excludes lakes, ponds, glaciers > 1 km^{2} (0.386 sq mi or 247 acres) and river estuaries.

Montreuil-Poulay (French pronunciation: [mɔ̃tʁœj pulɛ]) is a commune in the Mayenne department in north-western France.

== Geography ==
The commune is made up of the following collection of villages and hamlets, Les Moussais, La Talbotière, Montreuil-Poulay, Le Bois du Feu, Le Vieux Gast and Poulay.

== See also ==
- Communes of Mayenne
