= Rennes-en-Grenouilles =

- Commune
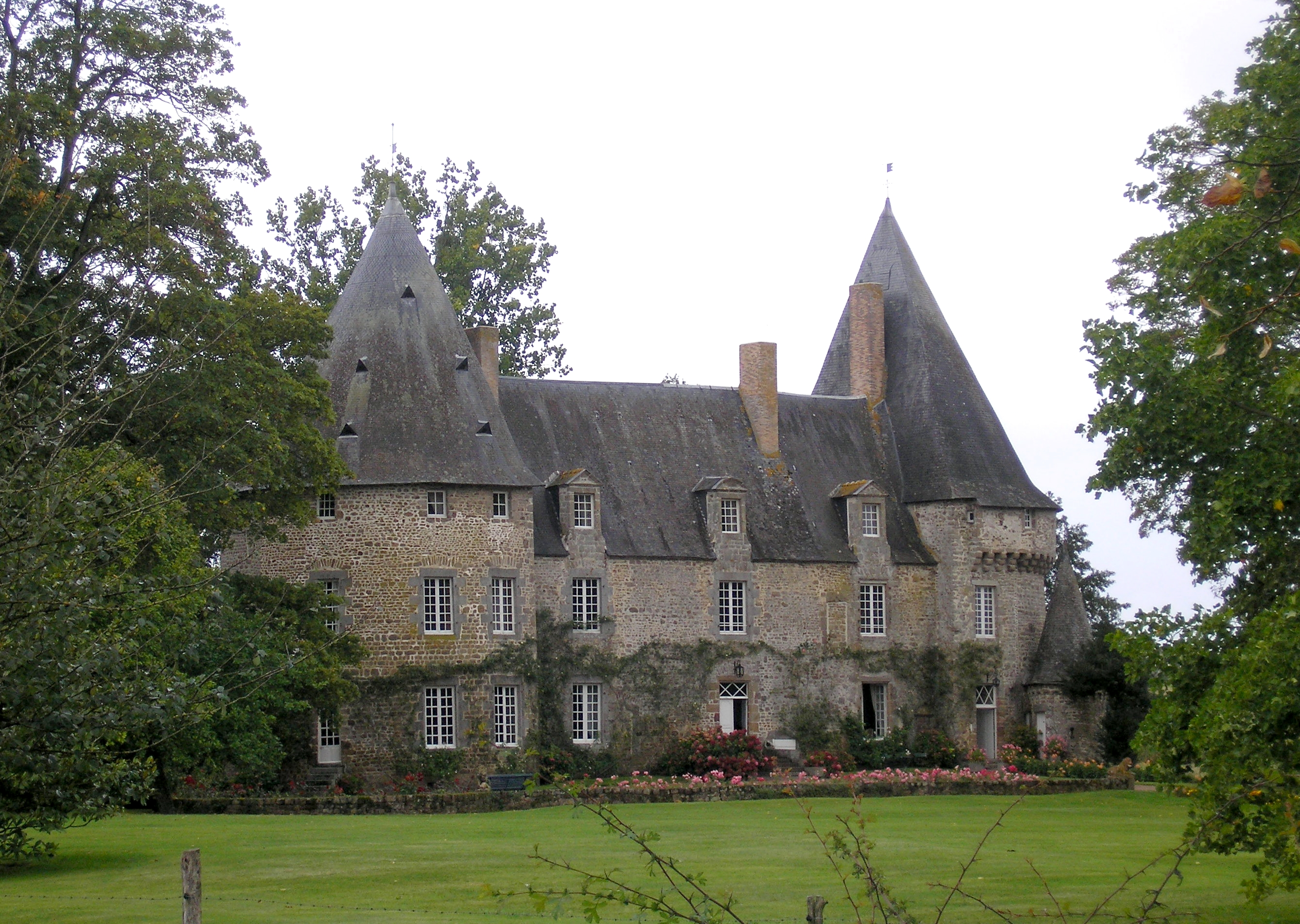
- The Château du Bois du Maine, in Rennes-en-Grenouilles
- Location of Rennes-en-Grenouilles
- Location within France Location within Pays de la Loire
- Coordinates: 48°29′36″N 0°30′39″W
- Country: France
- Region: Pays de la Loire
- Department: Mayenne
- Arrondissement: Mayenne
- Canton: Lassay-les-Châteaux

Government
  - Mayor (2021–2026): Hervé Gérard Sylvain Pillaert
- Area^{1}: 7.86 km^{2} (3.03 sq mi)
- Elevation: 30 m (98 ft)
- Highest elevation: 210 m (690 ft)
- Lowest elevation: 110 m (360 ft)
- Population (2023): 112
  - Density: 14.2/km^{2} (36.9/sq mi)
- Time zone: UTC+01:00 (CET)
  - Summer (DST): UTC+02:00 (CEST)
- INSEE/Postal code: 53189 /53110
- ^{1} French Land Register data, which excludes lakes, ponds, glaciers > 1 km^{2} (0.386 sq mi or 247 acres) and river estuaries.

Rennes-en-Grenouilles (French pronunciation: [ʁɛn ɑ̃ ɡʁənuj]) is a commune in the Mayenne department in north-western France.

== Geography ==
The commune is made up of the following collection of villages and hamlets, Le Haut Hazay, Rennes-en-Grenouilles, La Guiberdière, Le Saussay, La Coquère, La Vieille Pellière and La Maillardière.

The Mayenne river flows through the commune.

The commune is located within the Normandie-Maine Regional Natural Park.

== Points of Interest ==
=== National Heritage sites ===
- Château du Bois du Maine - a fifteenth century chateau, which was listed as a Monument historique in 1967.

== Notable people ==
- Jacques-François Dujarié - (1767-1838) a French Catholic priest who founded a congregation of religious sisters and another one of brothers, was born here.

== See also ==
- Communes of Mayenne
- Parc naturel régional Normandie-Maine
