= Le Ribay =

- Commune
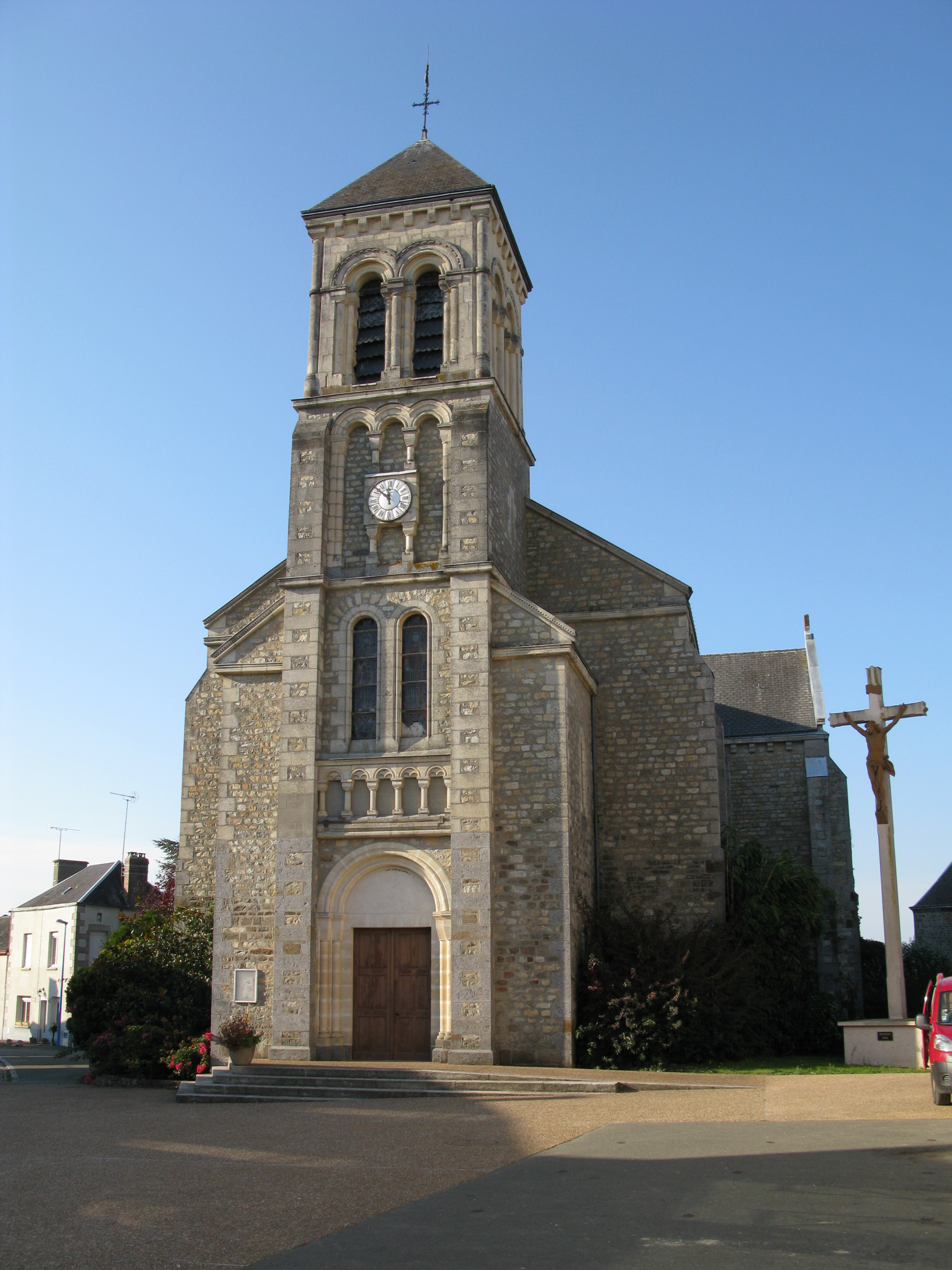
- Le Ribay's Saint-Ouen church

- Coat of arms
- Location of Le Ribay
- Location within France Location within Pays de la Loire
- Coordinates: 48°23′03″N 0°24′28″W
- Country: France
- Region: Pays de la Loire
- Department: Mayenne
- Arrondissement: Mayenne
- Canton: Lassay-les-Châteaux

Government
  - Mayor (2020–2026): Nora Fabro
- Area^{1}: 17.36 km^{2} (6.70 sq mi)
- Elevation: 208 m (682 ft)
- Highest elevation: 296 m (971 ft)
- Lowest elevation: 163 m (535 ft)
- Population (2023): 463
  - Density: 26.7/km^{2} (69.1/sq mi)
- Demonym: Ribayéens
- Time zone: UTC+01:00 (CET)
  - Summer (DST): UTC+02:00 (CEST)
- INSEE/Postal code: 53190 /53640
- Website: www.le-ribay.mairie53.fr
- ^{1} French Land Register data, which excludes lakes, ponds, glaciers > 1 km^{2} (0.386 sq mi or 247 acres) and river estuaries.

Le Ribay (French pronunciation: [lə ʁibɛ]) is a commune in the Mayenne department in north-western France.

== Geography ==
The commune is made up of the following collection of villages and hamlets, La Champonnière, Le Grand Aunay, Chauvallon, Le Plessis, Le Ribay, La Hayère, La Faburais, La Baumerie, La Touche, La Laire and Les Bas Bois.

== See also ==
- Communes of Mayenne
