= Charchigné =

- Commune
- Location of Charchigné
- Location within France Location within Pays de la Loire
- Coordinates: 48°25′06″N 0°24′27″W
- Country: France
- Region: Pays de la Loire
- Department: Mayenne
- Arrondissement: Mayenne
- Canton: Lassay-les-Châteaux

Government
  - Mayor (2020–2026): Stéphane Rioult-Leriche
- Area^{1}: 14.91 km^{2} (5.76 sq mi)
- Highest elevation: 257 m (843 ft)
- Lowest elevation: 163 m (535 ft)
- Population (2023): 459
  - Density: 30.8/km^{2} (79.7/sq mi)
- Time zone: UTC+01:00 (CET)
  - Summer (DST): UTC+02:00 (CEST)
- INSEE/Postal code: 53061 /53250
- ^{1} French Land Register data, which excludes lakes, ponds, glaciers > 1 km^{2} (0.386 sq mi or 247 acres) and river estuaries.

Charchigné (French pronunciation: [ʃaʁʃiɲe]) is a commune in the Mayenne department in north-western France.

== Geography ==
The commune is made up of the following collection of villages and hamlets, La Renière, Le Grand Anglaine, Charchigné, La Haie, Le Fougeray, La Masure, La Tuchonnière, La Fortinière, Quincé and La Herpinière.

== See also ==
- Communes of the Mayenne department
