= Marcillé-la-Ville =

- Commune
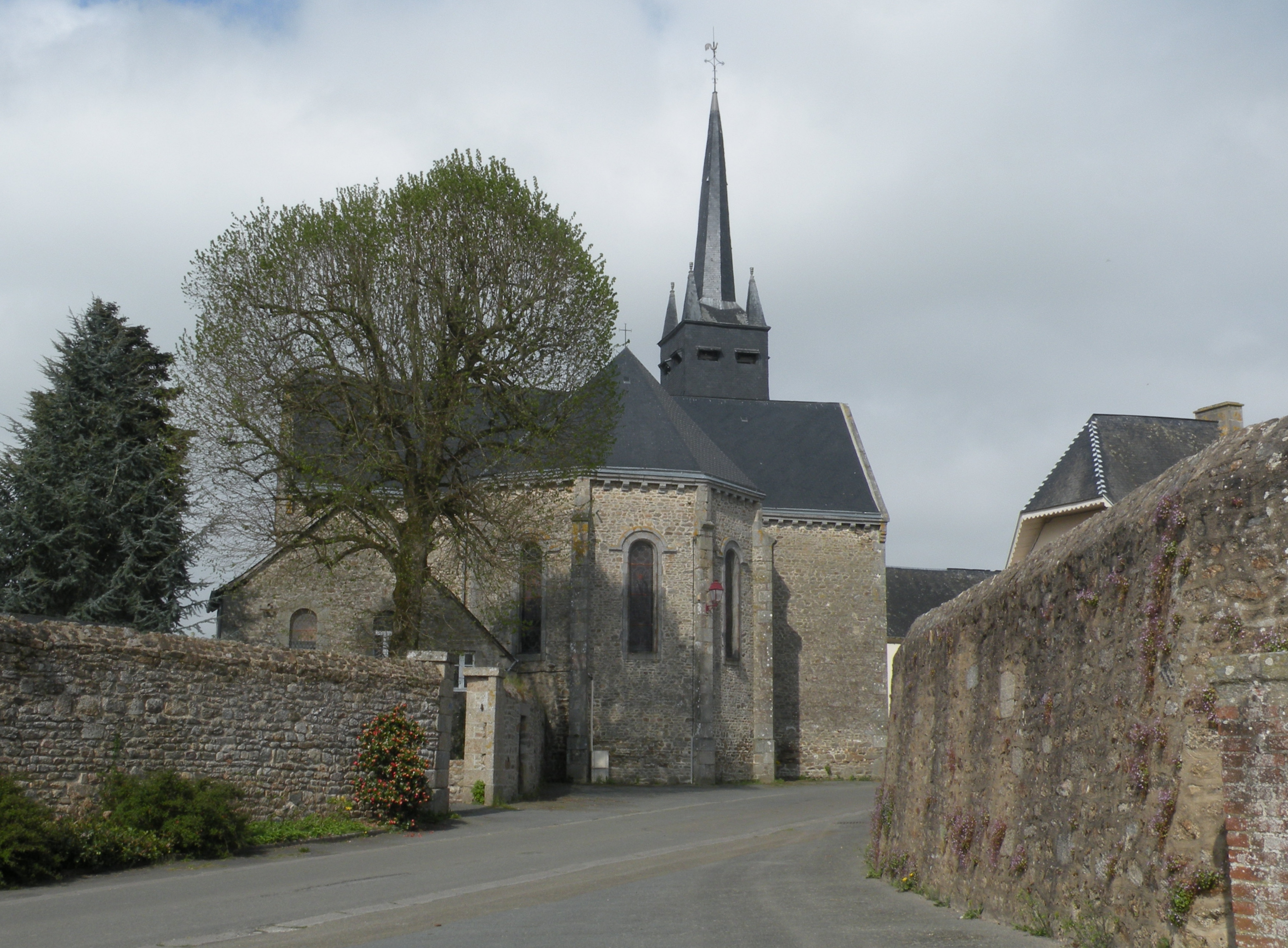
- The church of Saint-Martin, in Marcillé-la-Ville
- Location of Marcillé-la-Ville
- Location within France Location within Pays de la Loire
- Coordinates: 48°18′26″N 0°29′34″W
- Country: France
- Region: Pays de la Loire
- Department: Mayenne
- Arrondissement: Mayenne
- Canton: Lassay-les-Châteaux

Government
  - Mayor (2020–2026): Guy Beaujard
- Area^{1}: 26.96 km^{2} (10.41 sq mi)
- Elevation: 132 m (433 ft)
- Highest elevation: 327 m (1,073 ft)
- Lowest elevation: 124 m (407 ft)
- Population (2023): 758
  - Density: 28.1/km^{2} (72.8/sq mi)
- Time zone: UTC+01:00 (CET)
  - Summer (DST): UTC+02:00 (CEST)
- INSEE/Postal code: 53144 /53440
- ^{1} French Land Register data, which excludes lakes, ponds, glaciers > 1 km^{2} (0.386 sq mi or 247 acres) and river estuaries.

Marcillé-la-Ville (French pronunciation: [maʁsije la vil]) is a commune in the Mayenne department in north-western France.

== See also ==
- Communes of Mayenne
