= Arrondissement of Mayenne =

Coordinates: 48.30°N 0.62°W

Mayenne
- Arrondissement
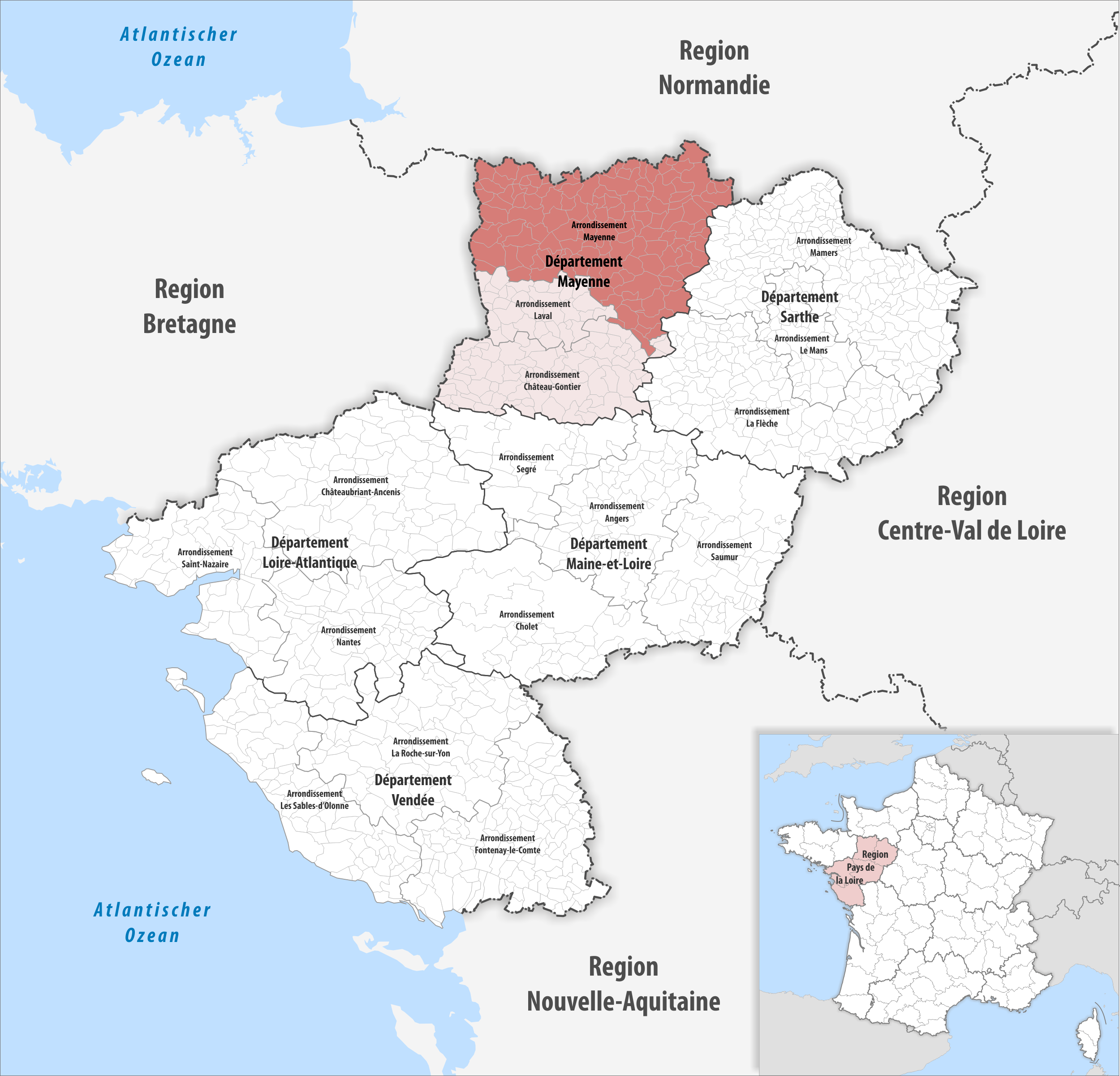
- Location within the region Pays de la Loire
- Country: France
- Region: Pays de la Loire
- Department: Mayenne
- No. of communes: {{{nbcomm}}}
- Area: 2,961.8 km^{2} (1,143.6 sq mi)
- Population (2023): 117,142
  - Density: 39.551/km^{2} (102.44/sq mi)
- INSEE code: 533

The arrondissement of Mayenne is an arrondissement of France in the Mayenne department in the Pays de la Loire region. It has 130 communes. Its population is 118,048 (2021), and its area is 2,961.8 km^{2} (1,143.6 sq mi).

== Composition ==
The communes of the arrondissement of Mayenne, and their INSEE codes, are:

1. Alexain (53002)
2. Ambrières-les-Vallées (53003)
3. Andouillé (53005)
4. Aron (53008)
5. Assé-le-Bérenger (53010)
6. Averton (53013)
7. La Baconnière (53015)
8. Bais (53016)
9. La Bazoge-Montpinçon (53021)
10. La Bazouge-des-Alleux (53023)
11. Belgeard (53028)
12. La Bigottière (53031)
13. Blandouet-Saint Jean (53228)
14. Boulay-les-Ifs (53038)
15. Brecé (53042)
16. Brée (53043)
17. Carelles (53047)
18. Chailland (53048)
19. Champéon (53051)
20. Champfrémont (53052)
21. Champgenéteux (53053)
22. Chantrigné (53055)
23. La Chapelle-au-Riboul (53057)
24. La Chapelle-Rainsouin (53059)
25. Charchigné (53061)
26. Châtillon-sur-Colmont (53064)
27. Chevaigné-du-Maine (53069)
28. Colombiers-du-Plessis (53071)
29. Commer (53072)
30. Contest (53074)
31. Couesmes-Vaucé (53079)
32. Couptrain (53080)
33. Courcité (53083)
34. Crennes-sur-Fraubée (53085)
35. La Croixille (53086)
36. Désertines (53091)
37. La Dorée (53093)
38. Ernée (53096)
39. Évron (53097)
40. Fougerolles-du-Plessis (53100)
41. Gesnes (53105)
42. Gesvres (53106)
43. Gorron (53107)
44. Grazay (53109)
45. La Haie-Traversaine (53111)
46. Le Ham (53112)
47. Hambers (53113)
48. Hardanges (53114)
49. Hercé (53115)
50. Le Horps (53116)
51. Le Housseau-Brétignolles (53118)
52. Izé (53120)
53. Javron-les-Chapelles (53121)
54. Jublains (53122)
55. Juvigné (53123)
56. Landivy (53125)
57. Larchamp (53126)
58. Lassay-les-Châteaux (53127)
59. Lesbois (53131)
60. Levaré (53132)
61. Lignières-Orgères (53133)
62. Livet (53134)
63. Loupfougères (53139)
64. Madré (53142)
65. Marcillé-la-Ville (53144)
66. Martigné-sur-Mayenne (53146)
67. Mayenne (53147)
68. Mézangers (53153)
69. Montaudin (53154)
70. Montenay (53155)
71. Montreuil-Poulay (53160)
72. Montsûrs (53161)
73. Moulay (53162)
74. Neau (53163)
75. Neuilly-le-Vendin (53164)
76. Oisseau (53170)
77. La Pallu (53173)
78. Parigné-sur-Braye (53174)
79. Le Pas (53176)
80. La Pellerine (53177)
81. Placé (53179)
82. Pontmain (53181)
83. Pré-en-Pail-Saint-Samson (53185)
84. Ravigny (53187)
85. Rennes-en-Grenouilles (53189)
86. Le Ribay (53190)
87. Sacé (53195)
88. Saint-Aignan-de-Couptrain (53196)
89. Saint-Aubin-du-Désert (53198)
90. Saint-Aubin-Fosse-Louvain (53199)
91. Saint-Baudelle (53200)
92. Saint-Berthevin-la-Tannière (53202)
93. Saint-Calais-du-Désert (53204)
94. Saint-Cyr-en-Pail (53208)
95. Saint-Denis-de-Gastines (53211)
96. Sainte-Gemmes-le-Robert (53218)
97. Saint-Ellier-du-Maine (53213)
98. Sainte-Marie-du-Bois (53235)
99. Sainte-Suzanne-et-Chammes (53255)
100. Saint-Fraimbault-de-Prières (53216)
101. Saint-Georges-Buttavent (53219)
102. Saint-Georges-le-Fléchard (53220)
103. Saint-Georges-sur-Erve (53221)
104. Saint-Germain-d'Anxure (53222)
105. Saint-Germain-de-Coulamer (53223)
106. Saint-Germain-le-Guillaume (53225)
107. Saint-Hilaire-du-Maine (53226)
108. Saint-Julien-du-Terroux (53230)
109. Saint-Léger (53232)
110. Saint-Loup-du-Gast (53234)
111. Saint-Mars-du-Désert (53236)
112. Saint-Mars-sur-Colmont (53237)
113. Saint-Mars-sur-la-Futaie (53238)
114. Saint-Pierre-des-Landes (53245)
115. Saint-Pierre-des-Nids (53246)
116. Saint-Pierre-sur-Erve (53248)
117. Saint-Thomas-de-Courceriers (53256)
118. Saulges (53257)
119. Soucé (53261)
120. Thorigné-en-Charnie (53264)
121. Thubœuf (53263)
122. Torcé-Viviers-en-Charnie (53265)
123. Trans (53266)
124. Vaiges (53267)
125. Vautorte (53269)
126. Vieuvy (53270)
127. Villaines-la-Juhel (53271)
128. Villepail (53272)
129. Vimartin-sur-Orthe (53239)
130. Voutré (53276)

== History ==
The arrondissement of Mayenne was created in 1800. At the March 2016 reorganisation of the arrondissements of Mayenne, it gained 38 communes from the arrondissement of Laval.

As a result of the reorganisation of the cantons of France which came into effect in 2015, the borders of the cantons are no longer related to the borders of the arrondissements. The cantons of the arrondissement of Mayenne were, as of January 2015:

1. Ambrières-les-Vallées
2. Bais
3. Couptrain
4. Ernée
5. Gorron
6. Le Horps
7. Landivy
8. Lassay-les-Châteaux
9. Mayenne-Est
10. Mayenne-Ouest
11. Pré-en-Pail
12. Villaines-la-Juhel
