= Grazay =

- Commune
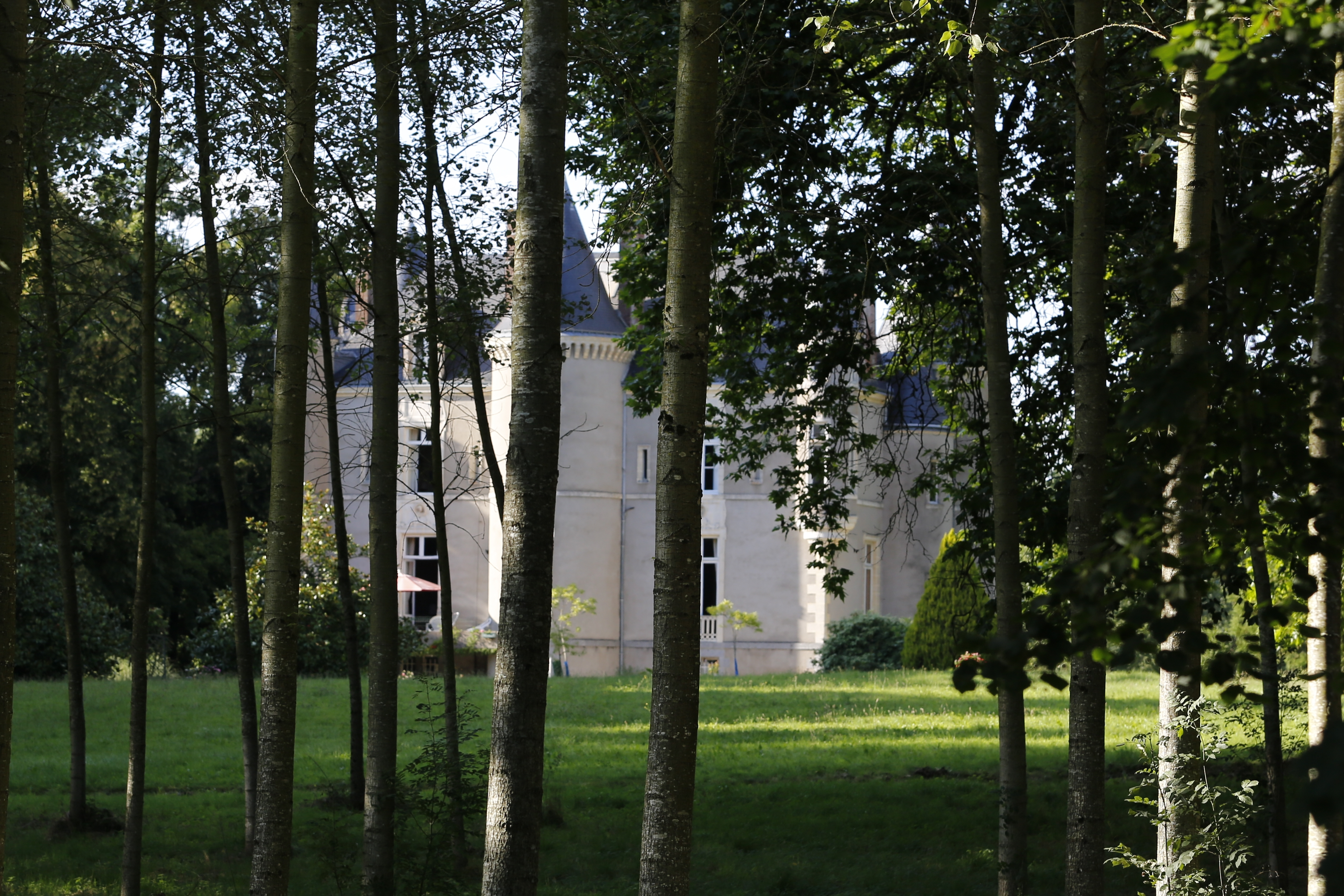
- The Logis du Bois, in Grazay
- Location of Grazay
- Location within France Location within Pays de la Loire
- Coordinates: 48°17′28″N 0°28′51″W
- Country: France
- Region: Pays de la Loire
- Department: Mayenne
- Arrondissement: Mayenne
- Canton: Lassay-les-Châteaux

Government
  - Mayor (2020–2026): Didier Boittin
- Area^{1}: 16.97 km^{2} (6.55 sq mi)
- Elevation: 133 m (436 ft)
- Highest elevation: 216 m (709 ft)
- Lowest elevation: 128 m (420 ft)
- Population (2023): 629
  - Density: 37.1/km^{2} (96.0/sq mi)
- Time zone: UTC+01:00 (CET)
  - Summer (DST): UTC+02:00 (CEST)
- INSEE/Postal code: 53109 /53440
- ^{1} French Land Register data, which excludes lakes, ponds, glaciers > 1 km^{2} (0.386 sq mi or 247 acres) and river estuaries.

Grazay (French pronunciation: [ɡʁazɛ]) is a village and commune in the Mayenne département of north-western France.

== See also ==
- Communes of the Mayenne department
