= Sainte-Marie-du-Bois, Mayenne =

Sainte-Marie-du-Bois
- Commune
- Location of Sainte-Marie-du-Bois
- Location within France Location within Pays de la Loire
- Coordinates: 48°27′57″N 0°28′47″W
- Country: France
- Region: Pays de la Loire
- Department: Mayenne
- Arrondissement: Mayenne
- Canton: Lassay-les-Châteaux

Government
  - Mayor (2020–2026): Pierre Rioult
- Area^{1}: 11.34 km^{2} (4.38 sq mi)
- Elevation: 230 m (750 ft)
- Highest elevation: 246 m (807 ft)
- Lowest elevation: 128 m (420 ft)
- Population (2023): 226
  - Density: 19.9/km^{2} (51.6/sq mi)
- Time zone: UTC+01:00 (CET)
  - Summer (DST): UTC+02:00 (CEST)
- INSEE/Postal code: 53235 /53110
- ^{1} French Land Register data, which excludes lakes, ponds, glaciers > 1 km^{2} (0.386 sq mi or 247 acres) and river estuaries.

Sainte-Marie-du-Bois (French pronunciation: [sɛ̃t maʁi dy bwa]) is a commune in the Mayenne department in north-western France. The town is near the regional park Normandie-Maine, approximately 11 km.

The municipality covers 11.3 km^{2} and had 228 inhabitants in 2021, population density 20 inhabitants per square kilometre. Its population has increased by 8.5% since 1999.

== Geography ==
The commune is made up of the following collection of villages and hamlets, Glandsemé, Le Boulay, La Beslinière, La Guette, Le Grand Glandsemé, La Guyonnière, Dougebert, La Drouardière, La Teyée, La Truchère, Sainte-Marie-du-Bois, Les Bouillons and Le Riolet.

The commune is located within the Normandie-Maine Regional Natural Park.

== See also ==
- Communes of Mayenne
- Parc naturel régional Normandie-Maine
