= Belgeard =

- Commune
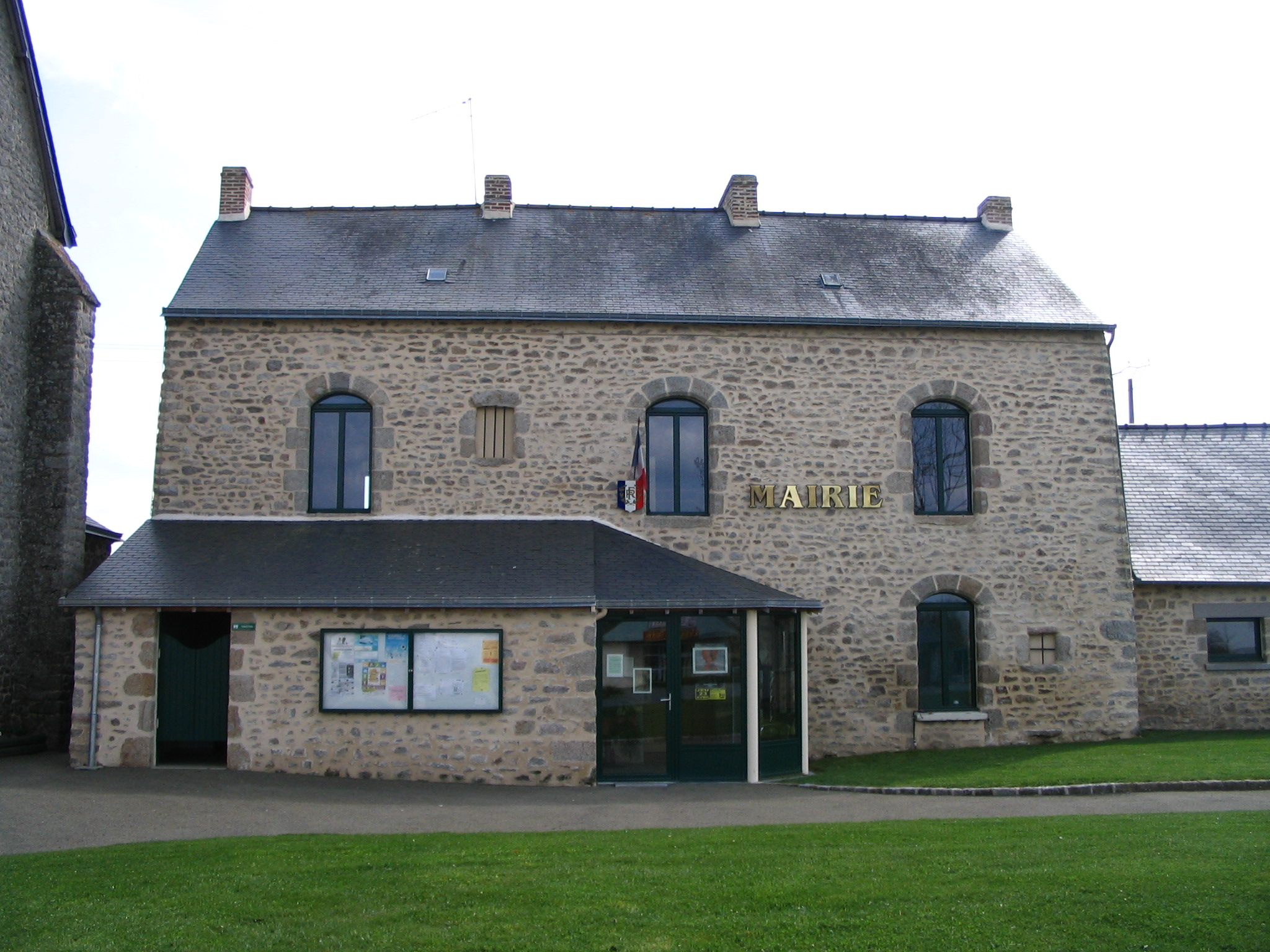
- The town hall in Belgeard
- Location of Belgeard
- Location within France Location within Pays de la Loire
- Coordinates: 48°15′16″N 0°32′52″W
- Country: France
- Region: Pays de la Loire
- Department: Mayenne
- Arrondissement: Mayenne
- Canton: Lassay-les-Châteaux

Government
  - Mayor (2020–2026): Jean-Pierre Chouzy
- Area^{1}: 13.01 km^{2} (5.02 sq mi)
- Elevation: 150 m (490 ft)
- Highest elevation: 162 m (531 ft)
- Lowest elevation: 114 m (374 ft)
- Population (2023): 555
  - Density: 42.7/km^{2} (110/sq mi)
- Time zone: UTC+01:00 (CET)
  - Summer (DST): UTC+02:00 (CEST)
- INSEE/Postal code: 53028 /53440
- ^{1} French Land Register data, which excludes lakes, ponds, glaciers > 1 km^{2} (0.386 sq mi or 247 acres) and river estuaries.

Belgeard (French pronunciation: [bɛlʒaʁ]) is a commune in the Mayenne department in northwestern France.

== Population ==
Historical population
Year	Pop.	±% p.a.
1968	301	—
1975	290	−0.53%
1982	307	+0.82%
1990	332	+0.98%
1999	335	+0.10%
2007	478	+4.54%
2012	565	+3.40%
2017	616	+1.74%
2023	555	−1.72%
Source: INSEE

== See also ==
- Communes of Mayenne
