= Commer, Mayenne =

Commer
- Commune
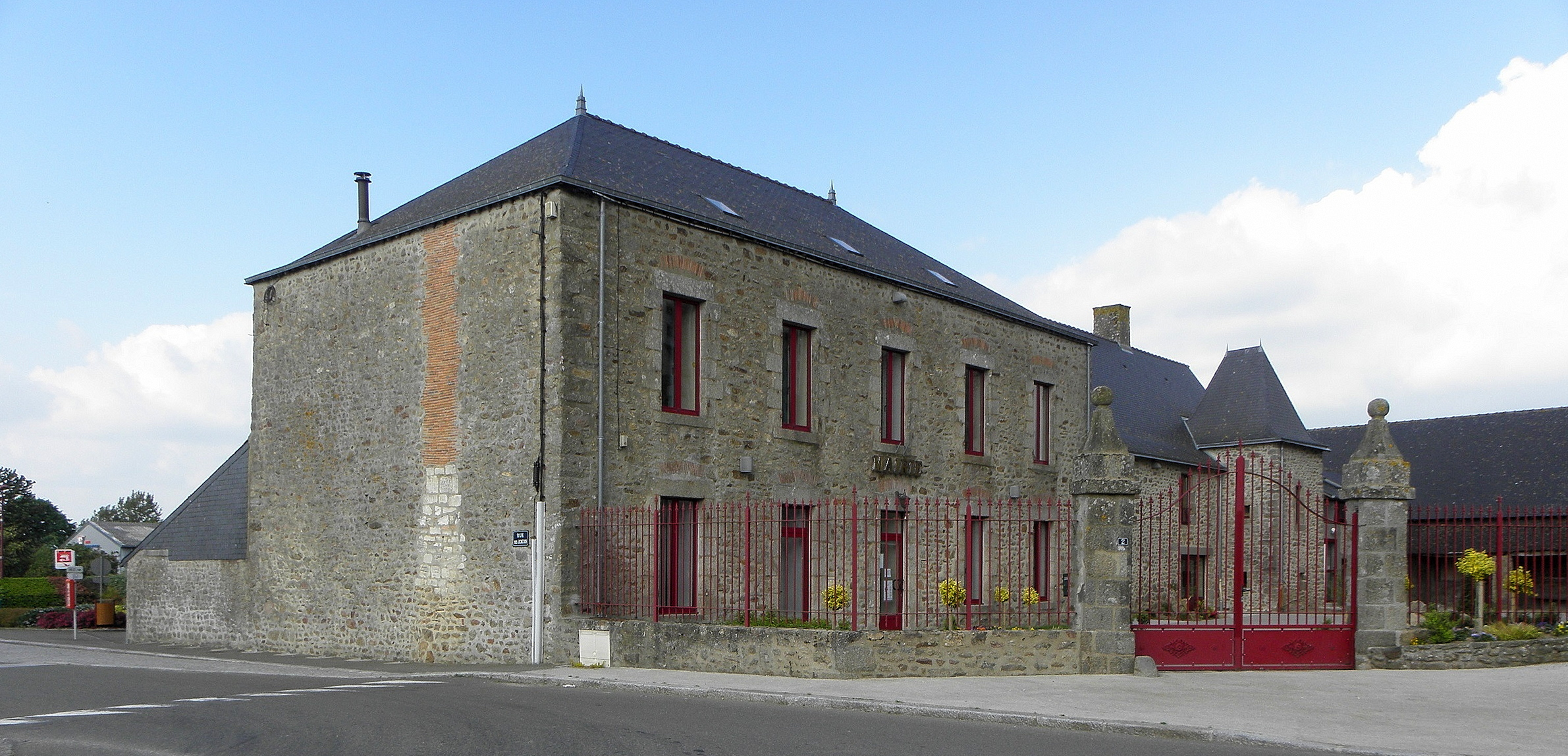
- Town hall

- Coat of arms
- Location of Commer
- Location within France Location within Pays de la Loire
- Coordinates: 48°14′30″N 0°37′08″W
- Country: France
- Region: Pays de la Loire
- Department: Mayenne
- Arrondissement: Mayenne
- Canton: Lassay-les-Châteaux

Government
  - Mayor (2020–2026): Mickaël Delahaye
- Area^{1}: 22.88 km^{2} (8.83 sq mi)
- Elevation: 137 m (449 ft)
- Highest elevation: 162 m (531 ft)
- Lowest elevation: 77 m (253 ft)
- Population (2023): 1,286
  - Density: 56.21/km^{2} (145.6/sq mi)
- Time zone: UTC+01:00 (CET)
  - Summer (DST): UTC+02:00 (CEST)
- INSEE/Postal code: 53072 /53470
- ^{1} French Land Register data, which excludes lakes, ponds, glaciers > 1 km^{2} (0.386 sq mi or 247 acres) and river estuaries.

Commer (French pronunciation: [kɔme]) is a commune in the Mayenne department in north-western France.

== See also ==
- Communes of the Mayenne department
