= Saint-Fraimbault-de-Prières =

- Commune
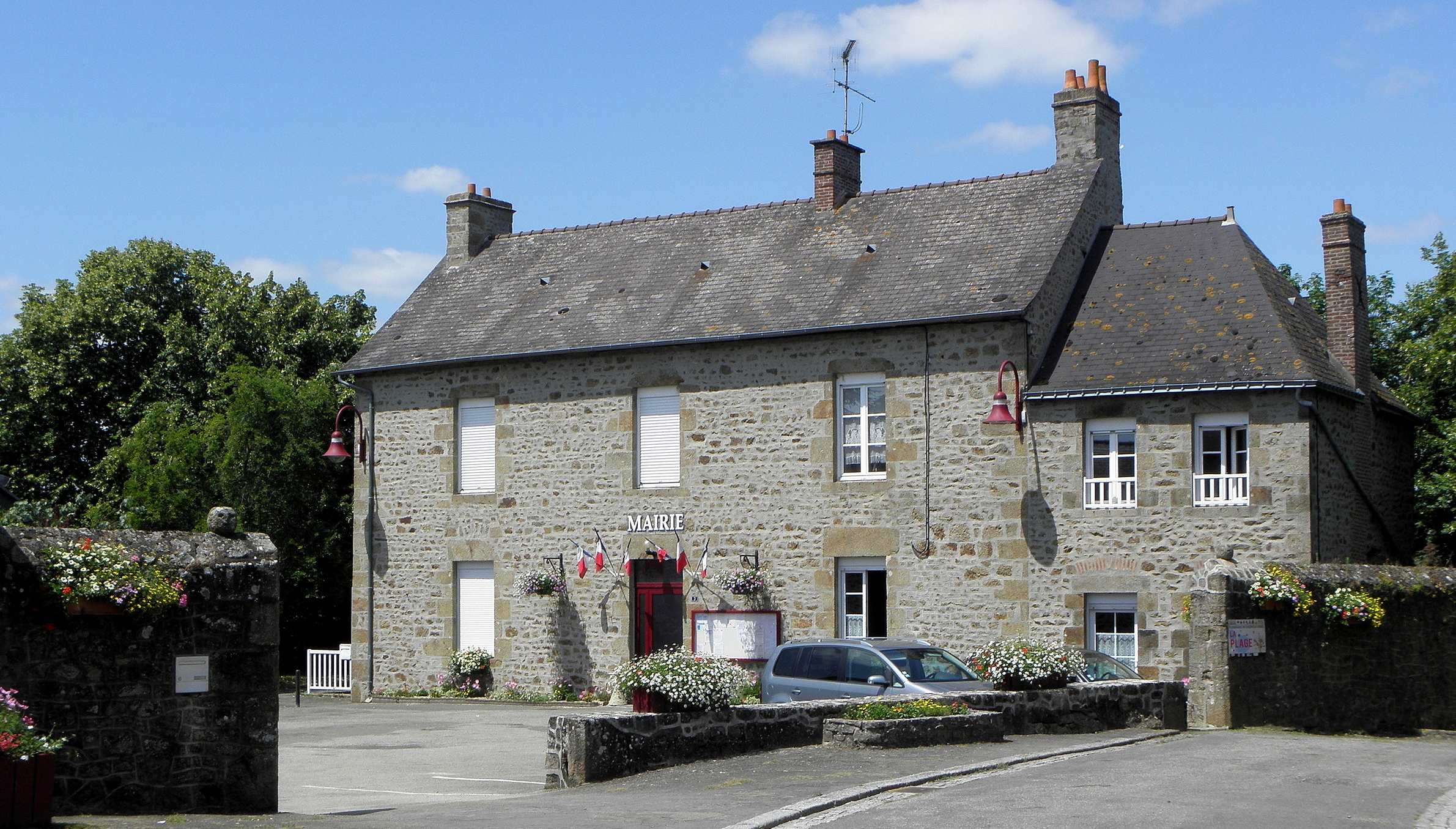
- Town hall

- Coat of arms
- Location of Saint-Fraimbault-de-Prières
- Location within France Location within Pays de la Loire
- Coordinates: 48°21′00″N 0°34′49″W
- Country: France
- Region: Pays de la Loire
- Department: Mayenne
- Arrondissement: Mayenne
- Canton: Lassay-les-Châteaux
- Intercommunality: CC Mayenne Communauté

Government
  - Mayor (2020–2026): Thierry Moutel
- Area^{1}: 16.85 km^{2} (6.51 sq mi)
- Elevation: 138 m (453 ft)
- Highest elevation: 155 m (509 ft)
- Lowest elevation: 87 m (285 ft)
- Population (2023): 926
  - Density: 55.0/km^{2} (142/sq mi)
- Time zone: UTC+01:00 (CET)
  - Summer (DST): UTC+02:00 (CEST)
- INSEE/Postal code: 53216 /53300
- ^{1} French Land Register data, which excludes lakes, ponds, glaciers > 1 km^{2} (0.386 sq mi or 247 acres) and river estuaries.

Saint-Fraimbault-de-Prières (French pronunciation: [sɛ̃ fʁɛ̃bo də pʁijɛʁ]) is a commune in the Mayenne department in north-western France.

== See also ==
- Communes of the Mayenne department
