= Thubœuf =

- Commune
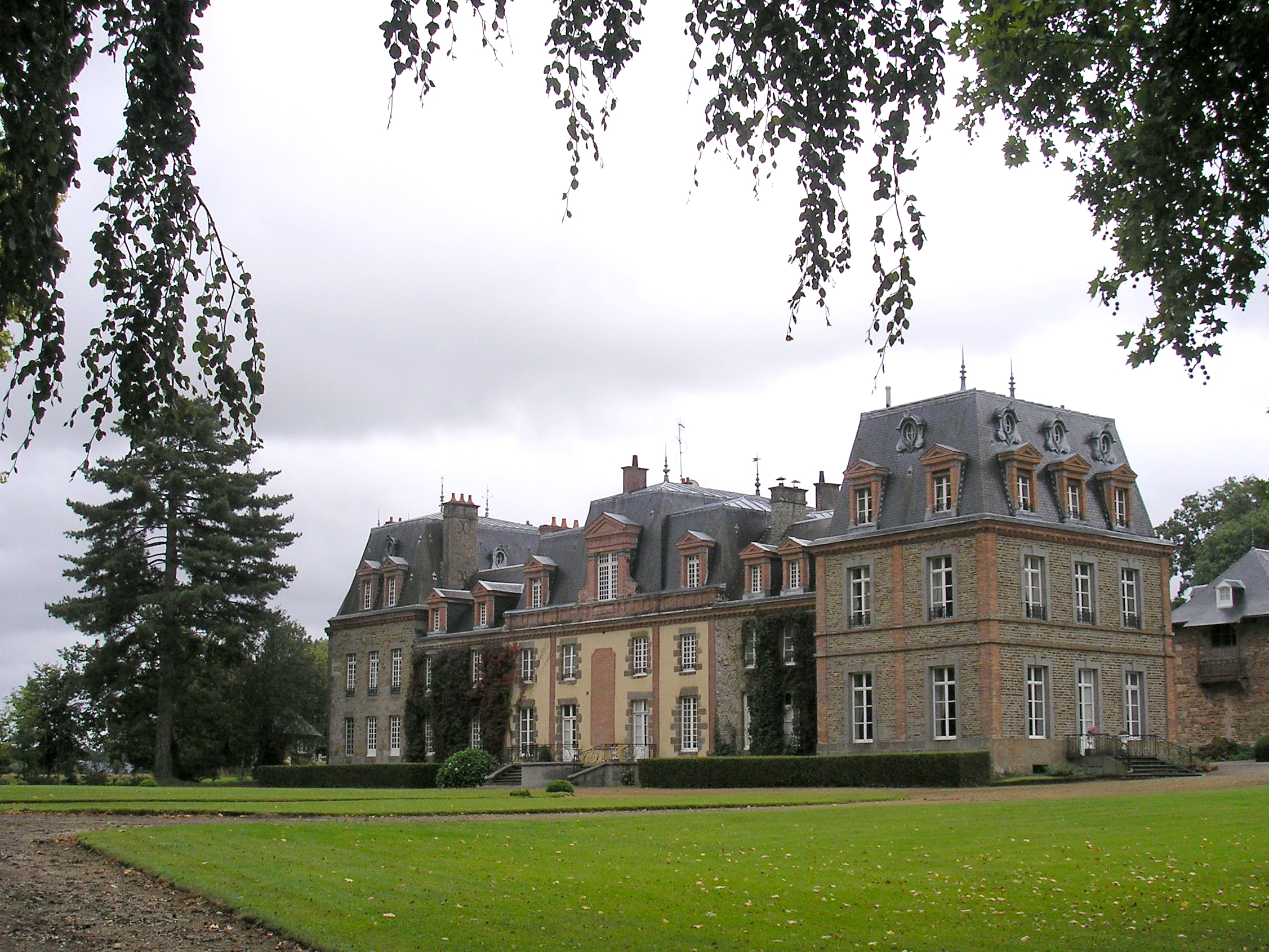
- The Château de Chantepie, in Thubœuf
- Location of Thubœuf
- Location within France Location within Pays de la Loire
- Coordinates: 48°30′10″N 0°26′59″W
- Country: France
- Region: Pays de la Loire
- Department: Mayenne
- Arrondissement: Mayenne
- Canton: Lassay-les-Châteaux

Government
  - Mayor (2020–2026): Michel Peccatte
- Area^{1}: 13.88 km^{2} (5.36 sq mi)
- Elevation: 120 m (390 ft)
- Highest elevation: 165 m (541 ft)
- Lowest elevation: 114 m (374 ft)
- Population (2023): 271
  - Density: 19.5/km^{2} (50.6/sq mi)
- Time zone: UTC+01:00 (CET)
  - Summer (DST): UTC+02:00 (CEST)
- INSEE/Postal code: 53263 /53110
- ^{1} French Land Register data, which excludes lakes, ponds, glaciers > 1 km^{2} (0.386 sq mi or 247 acres) and river estuaries.

Thubœuf (French pronunciation: [tybœf]) is a commune in the Mayenne department in north-western France.

== Geography ==
The commune is made up of the following collection of villages and hamlets, Chantepie, Les Touches, Thubœuf, La Bijardière, Montoger, Le Plessis, La Bouchardière and Le Péron.

The Mayenne river flows through the commune.

The commune is located within the Normandie-Maine Regional Natural Park.

== Points of Interest ==
=== National Heritage sites ===
- Château de Chantepie - a chateau, which was listed as a Monument historique in 1986.

== See also ==
- Communes of the Mayenne department
- Parc naturel régional Normandie-Maine
