= La Bazoge-Montpinçon =

- Commune
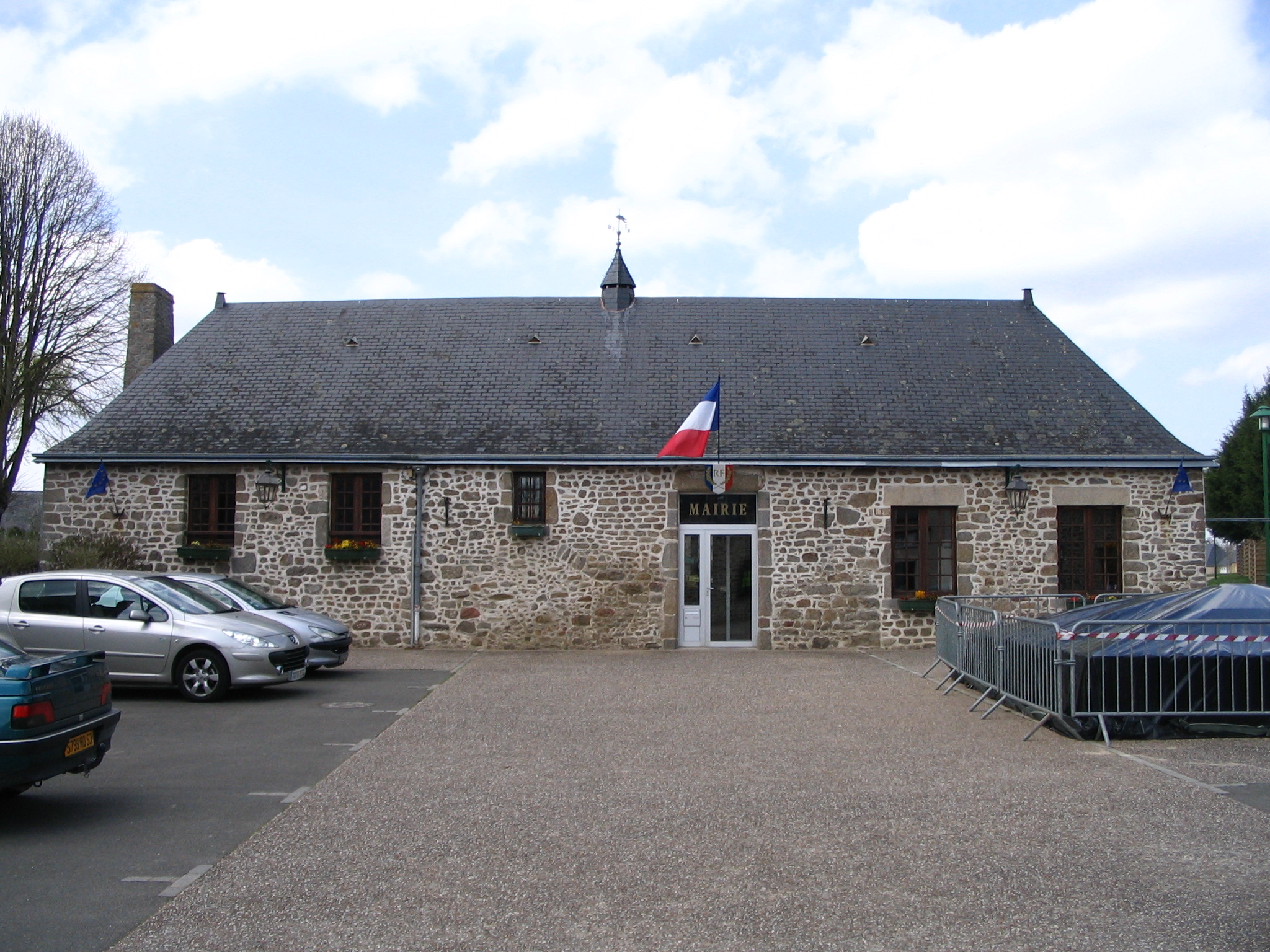
- The town hall in La Bazoge-Montpinçon
- Location of La Bazoge-Montpinçon
- Location within France Location within Pays de la Loire
- Coordinates: 48°16′43″N 0°34′25″W
- Country: France
- Region: Pays de la Loire
- Department: Mayenne
- Arrondissement: Mayenne
- Canton: Lassay-les-Châteaux

Government
  - Mayor (2026–32): Pascal Renard
- Area^{1}: 8.44 km^{2} (3.26 sq mi)
- Elevation: 118 m (387 ft)
- Highest elevation: 144 m (472 ft)
- Lowest elevation: 99 m (325 ft)
- Population (2023): 953
  - Density: 113/km^{2} (292/sq mi)
- Time zone: UTC+01:00 (CET)
  - Summer (DST): UTC+02:00 (CEST)
- INSEE/Postal code: 53021 /53440
- ^{1} French Land Register data, which excludes lakes, ponds, glaciers > 1 km^{2} (0.386 sq mi or 247 acres) and river estuaries.

La Bazoge-Montpinçon (French pronunciation: [la bazɔʒ mɔ̃pɛ̃sɔ̃]) is a commune in the Mayenne department in northwestern France.

== Population ==
Historical population
Year	Pop.	±% p.a.
1968	163	—
1975	201	+3.04%
1982	334	+7.52%
1990	495	+5.04%
1999	525	+0.66%
2007	818	+5.70%
2012	974	+3.55%
2017	1,015	+0.83%
2023	953	−1.04%
Source: INSEE

== See also ==
- Communes of Mayenne
