= Hardanges =

- Commune
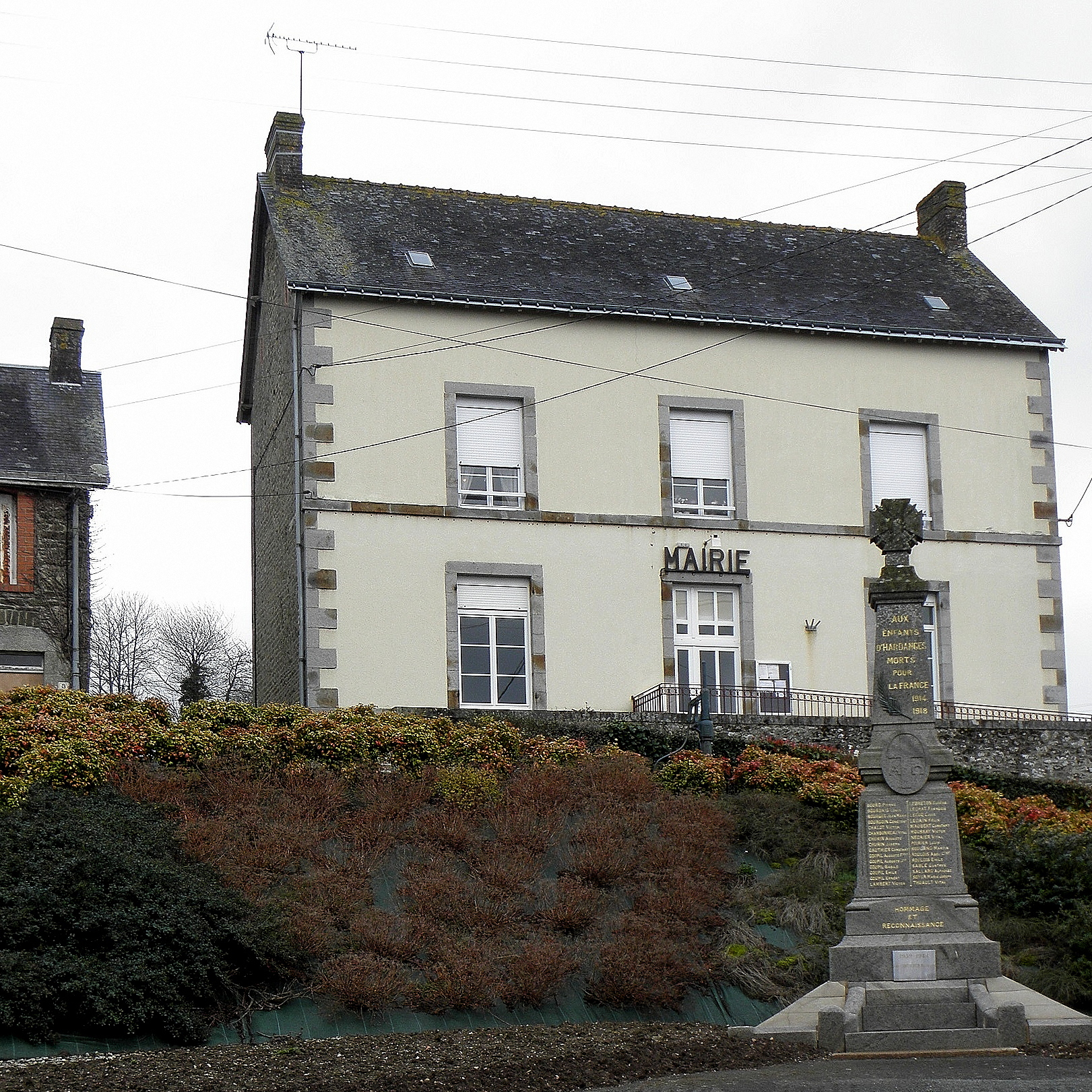
- Hardanges Town Hall

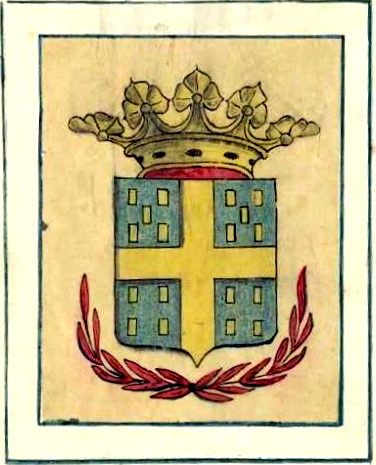
- Coat of arms
- Location of Hardanges
- Location within France Location within Pays de la Loire
- Coordinates: 48°20′14″N 0°24′03″W
- Country: France
- Region: Pays de la Loire
- Department: Mayenne
- Arrondissement: Mayenne
- Canton: Lassay-les-Châteaux

Government
  - Mayor (2020–2026): Eric Neveu
- Area^{1}: 18.48 km^{2} (7.14 sq mi)
- Elevation: 225 m (738 ft)
- Highest elevation: 327 m (1,073 ft)
- Lowest elevation: 149 m (489 ft)
- Population (2023): 169
  - Density: 9.15/km^{2} (23.7/sq mi)
- Time zone: UTC+01:00 (CET)
  - Summer (DST): UTC+02:00 (CEST)
- INSEE/Postal code: 53114 /53640
- ^{1} French Land Register data, which excludes lakes, ponds, glaciers > 1 km^{2} (0.386 sq mi or 247 acres) and river estuaries.

Hardanges (French pronunciation: [aʁdɑ̃ʒ]) is a French commune, located in Mayenne, Pays de la Loire, populated by 203 persons. The commune is part of the historic province of Maine (province).

== History ==
The Latin form of the name Hardengia. It is formed of a Germanic medieval suffix -ing (indicating property), one of few such examples in West France.

== Geography ==
Hardanges is located 11 km from Villaines-la-Juhel and 17 km from Mayenne. The N12 road is 7 km from the commune.

Hardagnes is a rural commune, as such it is part of those communes judged "sparse or very sparse" by the French Insee. As the commune is part of the Aire d'attraction of Mayenne, it is a Crown Commune.

The commune is made up of the following collection of villages and hamlets, Les Aulnais, La Thébaudière, La Morandière, Hardanges, La Rongère, La Bérachère, La Martelière and La Chasseguerre.

== Local culture and heritage ==
Key sites and monuments include:

- St Peter's Church
- St Matthew's Chapel, built in 1775
- La Chasse-Guerre Castle
- La Butte Park
- Le Saule Mountain

== Sport ==
The commune is home to the Les Découvertes Motocross circuit. It was created in 1987 by former motocross competitor, Raymond Lebreton and has been used to host some national competitions.

== See also ==
- Communes of the Mayenne department
