= Saint-Julien-du-Terroux =

- Commune
- Location of Saint-Julien-du-Terroux
- Location within France Location within Pays de la Loire
- Coordinates: 48°28′47″N 0°24′29″W
- Country: France
- Region: Pays de la Loire
- Department: Mayenne
- Arrondissement: Mayenne
- Canton: Lassay-les-Châteaux

Government
  - Mayor (2020–2026): Philippe Coulon
- Area^{1}: 11.29 km^{2} (4.36 sq mi)
- Elevation: 160 m (520 ft)
- Highest elevation: 176 m (577 ft)
- Lowest elevation: 119 m (390 ft)
- Population (2023): 258
  - Density: 22.9/km^{2} (59.2/sq mi)
- Time zone: UTC+01:00 (CET)
  - Summer (DST): UTC+02:00 (CEST)
- INSEE/Postal code: 53230 /53110
- ^{1} French Land Register data, which excludes lakes, ponds, glaciers > 1 km^{2} (0.386 sq mi or 247 acres) and river estuaries.

Saint-Julien-du-Terroux (French pronunciation: [sɛ̃ ʒyljɛ̃ dy tɛʁu]) is a commune in the Mayenne department in north-western France.

== Geography ==
The commune is made up of the following collection of villages and hamlets, Le Pont de Couterne, Saint-Julien-du-Terroux and Les Variés.

The river Mayenne flows through the commune.

== Notable person ==
- René Antoine Ferchault de Réaumur (1683–1757), entomologist, died in Saint-Julien-du-Terroux

== See also ==
- Communes of the Mayenne department
