= Moulay =

- Commune
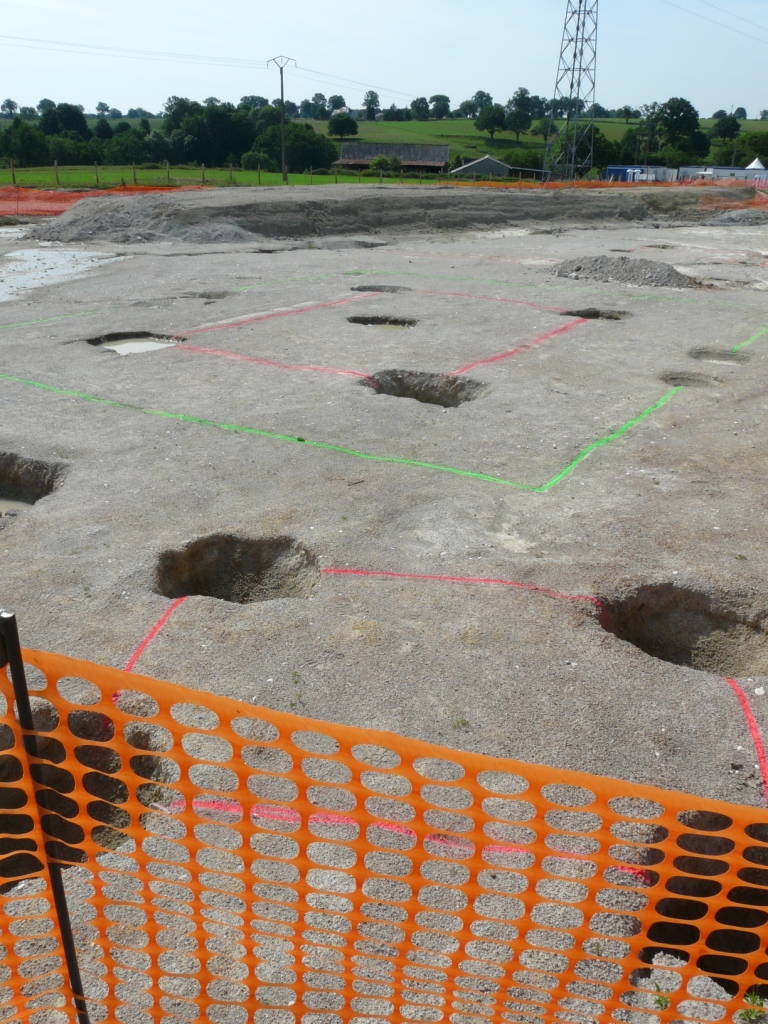
- An excavation of a former dwelling, in Moulay
- Location of Moulay
- Location within France Location within Pays de la Loire
- Coordinates: 48°16′25″N 0°37′38″W
- Country: France
- Region: Pays de la Loire
- Department: Mayenne
- Arrondissement: Mayenne
- Canton: Lassay-les-Châteaux

Government
  - Mayor (2020–2026): Frédéric Bordelet
- Area^{1}: 8.66 km^{2} (3.34 sq mi)
- Elevation: 120 m (390 ft)
- Highest elevation: 138 m (453 ft)
- Lowest elevation: 80 m (260 ft)
- Population (2023): 973
  - Density: 112/km^{2} (291/sq mi)
- Time zone: UTC+01:00 (CET)
  - Summer (DST): UTC+02:00 (CEST)
- INSEE/Postal code: 53162 /53100
- ^{1} French Land Register data, which excludes lakes, ponds, glaciers > 1 km^{2} (0.386 sq mi or 247 acres) and river estuaries.

Moulay (French pronunciation: [mulɛ]) is a commune in the Mayenne department in north-western France.

== See also ==
- Communes of Mayenne
