= Aron, Mayenne =

Aron
- Commune
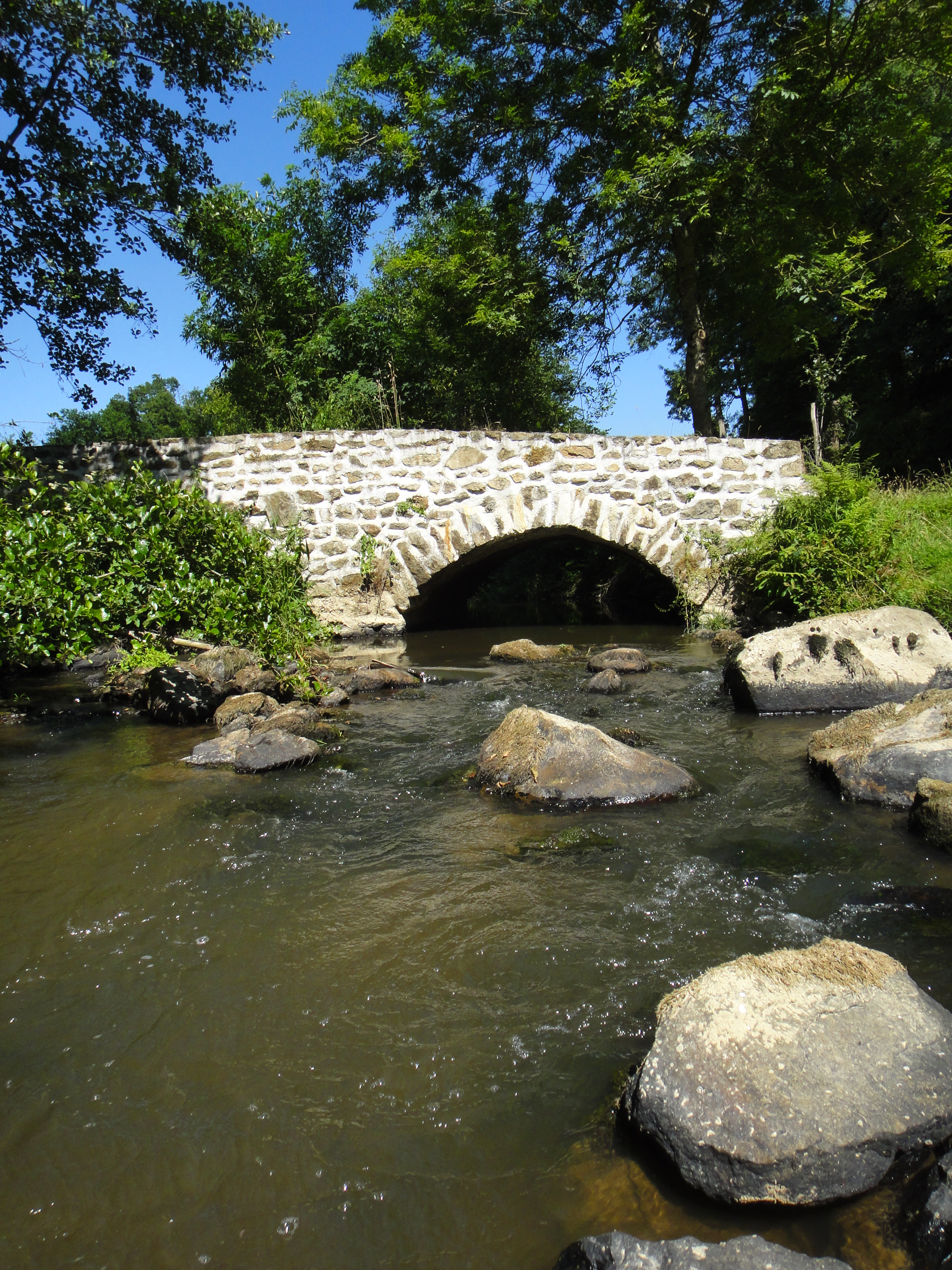
- The river Aron at the bridge of Buchaud
- Location of Aron
- Location within France Location within Pays de la Loire
- Coordinates: 48°17′42″N 0°33′22″W
- Country: France
- Region: Pays de la Loire
- Department: Mayenne
- Arrondissement: Mayenne
- Canton: Lassay-les-Châteaux
- Intercommunality: Mayenne Communauté

Government
  - Mayor (2020–2026): Étienne Giffard
- Area^{1}: 32.85 km^{2} (12.68 sq mi)
- Elevation: 137 m (449 ft)
- Highest elevation: 160 m (520 ft)
- Lowest elevation: 103 m (338 ft)
- Population (2023): 1,828
  - Density: 55.65/km^{2} (144.1/sq mi)
- Time zone: UTC+01:00 (CET)
  - Summer (DST): UTC+02:00 (CEST)
- INSEE/Postal code: 53008 /53440
- ^{1} French Land Register data, which excludes lakes, ponds, glaciers > 1 km^{2} (0.386 sq mi or 247 acres) and river estuaries.

Aron (French pronunciation: [aʁɔ̃]) is a commune in the Mayenne department in northwestern France.

== Population ==
Historical population
Year	Pop.	±% p.a.
1968	1,056	—
1975	1,141	+1.11%
1982	1,293	+1.80%
1990	1,378	+0.80%
1999	1,550	+1.32%
2007	1,719	+1.30%
2012	1,754	+0.40%
2017	1,803	+0.55%
2023	1,828	+0.23%
Source: INSEE

== See also ==
- Communes of Mayenne
