= Canton of Lassay-les-Châteaux =

Coordinates: 48.44°N 0.50°W

The canton of Lassay-les-Châteaux is an administrative division of the Mayenne department, northwestern France. Its borders were modified at the French canton reorganisation which came into effect in March 2015. Its seat is in Lassay-les-Châteaux.

It consists of the following communes:

1. Aron
2. La Bazoge-Montpinçon
3. Belgeard
4. Champéon
5. La Chapelle-au-Riboul
6. Charchigné
7. Commer
8. Grazay
9. La Haie-Traversaine
10. Hardanges
11. Le Horps
12. Le Housseau-Brétignolles
13. Jublains
14. Lassay-les-Châteaux
15. Marcillé-la-Ville
16. Martigné-sur-Mayenne
17. Montreuil-Poulay
18. Moulay
19. Rennes-en-Grenouilles
20. Le Ribay
21. Sainte-Marie-du-Bois
22. Saint-Fraimbault-de-Prières
23. Saint-Julien-du-Terroux
24. Thubœuf
