= La Haie-Traversaine =

- Commune
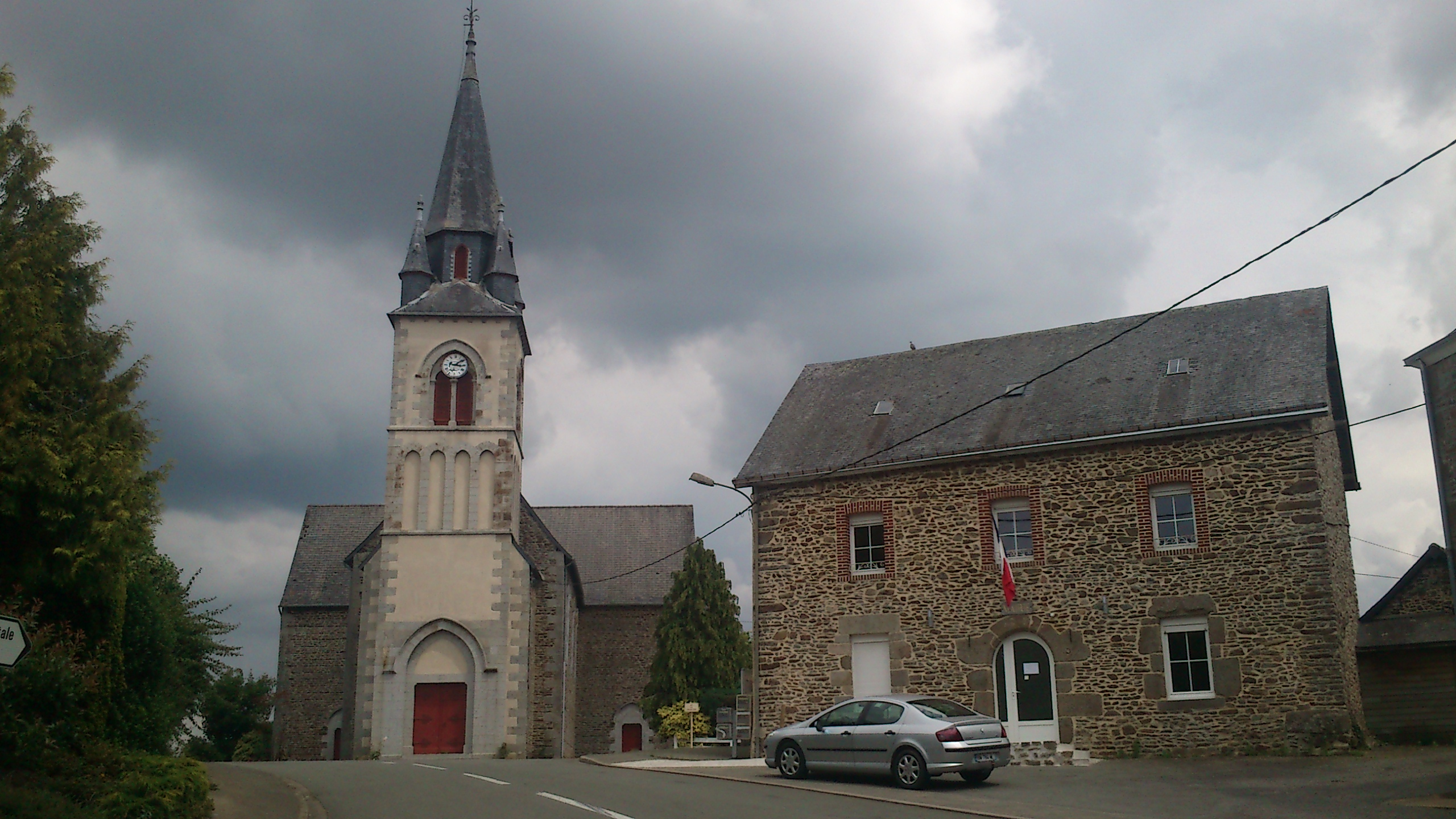
- The town hall and church in La Haie-Traversaine
- Location of La Haie-Traversaine
- Location within France Location within Pays de la Loire
- Coordinates: 48°22′12″N 0°36′20″W
- Country: France
- Region: Pays de la Loire
- Department: Mayenne
- Arrondissement: Mayenne
- Canton: Lassay-les-Châteaux

Government
  - Mayor (2020–2026): Didier Betton
- Area^{1}: 10.70 km^{2} (4.13 sq mi)
- Elevation: 115 m (377 ft)
- Highest elevation: 164 m (538 ft)
- Lowest elevation: 87 m (285 ft)
- Population (2023): 468
  - Density: 43.7/km^{2} (113/sq mi)
- Time zone: UTC+01:00 (CET)
  - Summer (DST): UTC+02:00 (CEST)
- INSEE/Postal code: 53111 /53300
- ^{1} French Land Register data, which excludes lakes, ponds, glaciers > 1 km^{2} (0.386 sq mi or 247 acres) and river estuaries.

La Haie-Traversaine (French pronunciation: [la ɛ tʁavɛʁsɛn]) is a commune in the Mayenne department in north-western France.

== See also ==
- Communes of the Mayenne department
