= Rebuffat =

Rebufatt is a French surname. Notable people with the surname include:

- Gaston Rébuffat (1921–1985), French alpinist, mountain guide, and author
- René Rebuffat (1930–2019), French historian and archaeologist, specializing in ancient Africa
