= Noiodunum =

Noiodunum may refer to:

- Nyon, Vaud, Switzerland
- Jublains, Mayenne, France
