= Jean Lebeuf =

French historian (1687–1760)

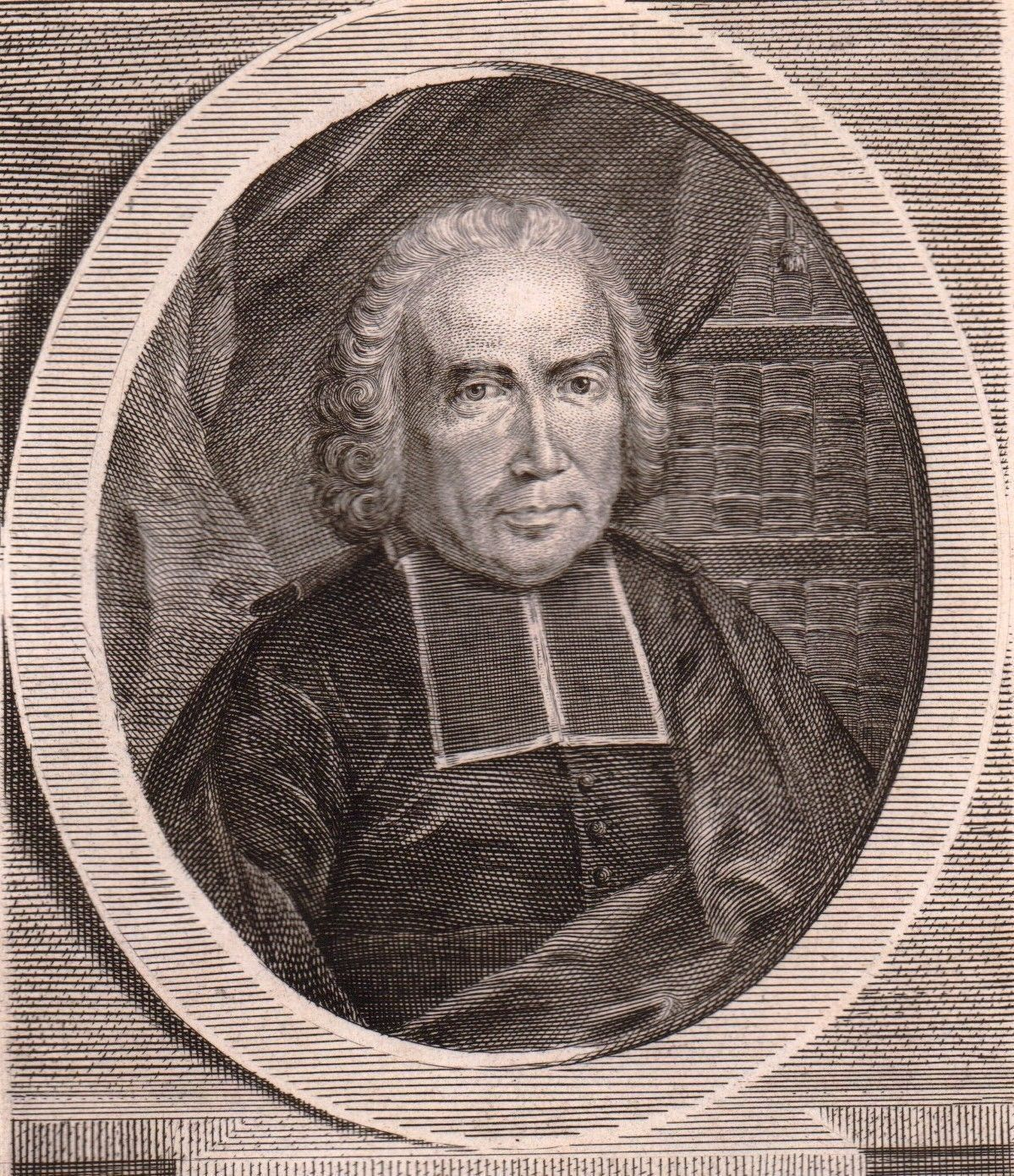
Jean Lebeuf.

Jean Lebeuf (French pronunciation: [ʒɑ̃ ləbœf]; 7 March 1687 – 10 April 1760) was a French historian.

== Early life ==
Lebeuf was born at Auxerre, Province of Burgundy, where his father, a councillor in the parlement, was receveur des consignations. He began his studies in his native town, and continued them in Paris at the Collège Sainte-Barbe. He became known as one of his time's most cultivated minds. He mastered practically every branch of medieval learning, and had a thorough knowledge of the sources and the bibliography of his subjects.

== Career ==
His learning was drawn from books; but as an archaeologist, he went on many expeditions across France, on foot. On these expeditions he examined monuments of architecture and sculpture, as well as libraries, and produced many notes and sketches. He was in correspondence with the learned men of the day. His correspondence with President Bouhier was published in 1885 by Ernest Petit; his other letters were edited by the Société des Sciences Historiques et Naturelles de L'Yonne. He wrote numerous articles. After his election as a member of the Académie des Inscriptions et Belles Lettres (1740), he produced a number of Mémoires that appeared in the Recueil of this society. He died in Paris.

== Research ==
Lebeuf's most important research had Paris as its subject. He published a collection of Dissertations sur l'histoire civile et ecclésiastique de Paris, then an Histoire de la ville et de tout le diocèse de Paris, mostly taken from the original sources. In view of scholarship's 19th century advances, he published a second, updated, edition. The reprinting was undertaken by Hippolyte Cocheris, but was interrupted (1863) before the completion of volume IV. Adrien Augier resumed the work, and added a sixth volume containing an analytical table of contents. Finally, Fernand Bournon completed the work with a volume of Rectifications et additions in 1890.

Lebeuf's bibliography appears partly in the Bibliothèque des écrivains de Bourgogne (1716–1741). His biography was written by Charles le Beau in the Histoire de l'Académie royale des Inscriptions, and by H. Cocheris, in the preface to his edition.

== See also ==
- Jublains archeological site, whose discovery was due in part to Lebeuf
