= René Rebuffat =

French historian and archaeologist (1930–2019)

René Rebuffat (10 September 1930 – 31 October 2019) was a French historian and archaeologist, specializing in ancient Africa. He conducted archaeological excavations at Thamusida in Morocco, Bu-Njem to (Gholaia) in Libya, and in the Sebou basin in Morocco. He also worked on archaeological sites of Aléria and Jublains.

== Career ==
A student of the École normale supérieure (class 1952), then a member of the École française de Rome (1959), he was detached to the service of Antiquities of Morocco (1961) where he began his scientific career. He entered the CNRS in 1963, which he left in 1998 with the title of emeritus Research Director.

In historical linguistics, he contributed since 2002 to research on linguistic practices of ancient North Africa, and among others to research on Numidian language inscriptions.

== Publications (partial list) ==
- Le complexe fortifié de Jublains [collaborations], J. Naveau, Recherches sur Jublains et sur la cité des Diablintes, 1997
- Thamusida I, II, III, [collaborations], Collection de l'Ecole Française de Rome, 1965, 1970, 1977, 1977
- Aires sémantiques des principaux mots libyques, in MEFRA 118/1, 2006, p. 267-295

== See also ==
- Jublains archeological site
