= Jublains =

- Commune
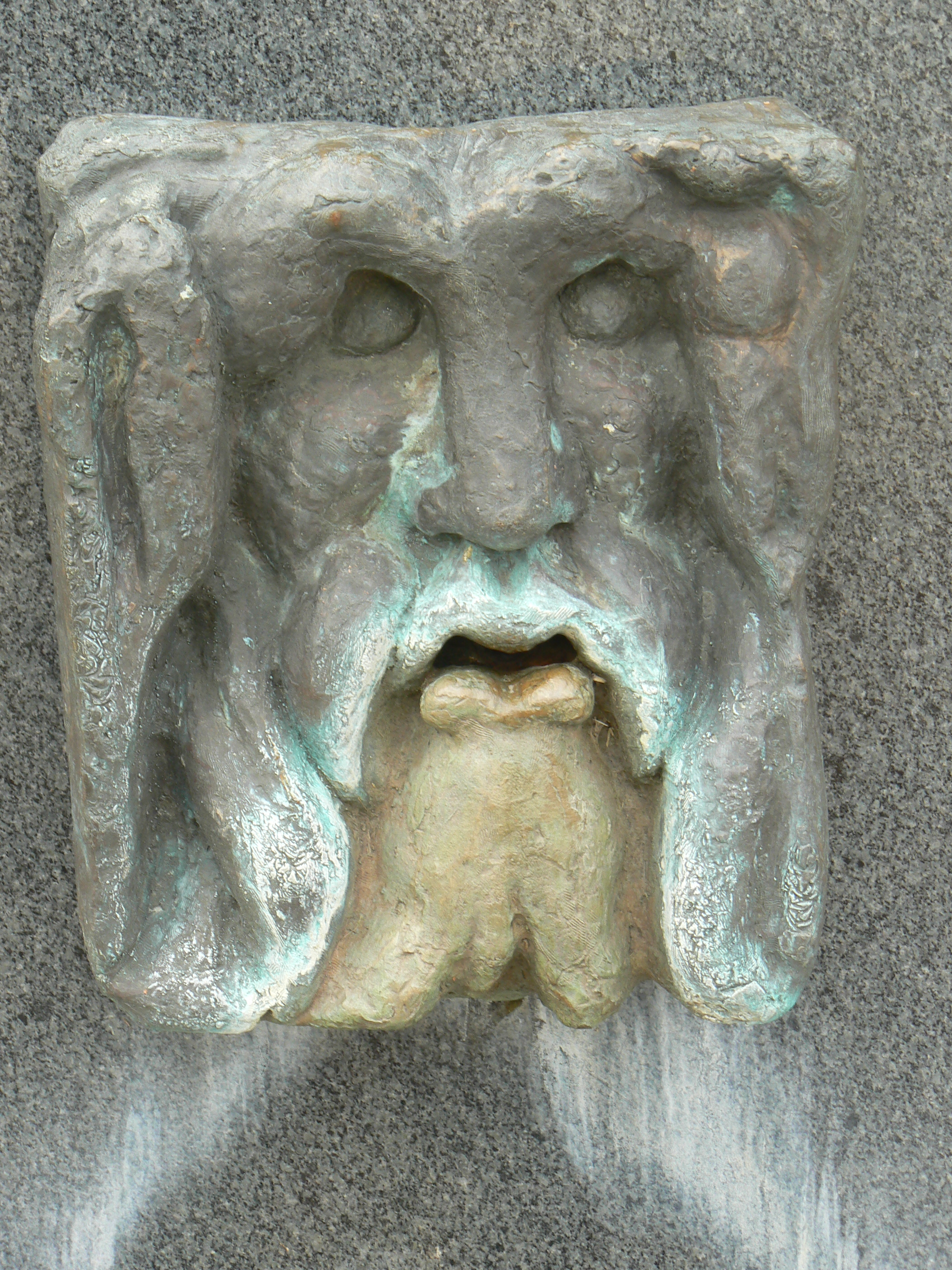
- Detail of the fountain, located to the side of the church, with the representation of the god Oceanus, the symbol of Jublains
- Location of Jublains
- Location within France Location within Pays de la Loire
- Coordinates: 48°15′15″N 0°29′49″W
- Country: France
- Region: Pays de la Loire
- Department: Mayenne
- Arrondissement: Mayenne
- Canton: Lassay-les-Châteaux

Government
  - Mayor (2020–2026): Alain Rondeau
- Area^{1}: 36.01 km^{2} (13.90 sq mi)
- Elevation: 147 m (482 ft)
- Highest elevation: 190 m (620 ft)
- Lowest elevation: 104 m (341 ft)
- Population (2023): 747
  - Density: 20.7/km^{2} (53.7/sq mi)
- Time zone: UTC+01:00 (CET)
  - Summer (DST): UTC+02:00 (CEST)
- INSEE/Postal code: 53122 /53160
- ^{1} French Land Register data, which excludes lakes, ponds, glaciers > 1 km^{2} (0.386 sq mi or 247 acres) and river estuaries.

Jublains (French pronunciation: [ʒyblɛ̃]) is a commune in the Mayenne department in north-western France.

== History ==
Jublains, formerly spelled Jubleins, is the site of ancient Noeodunum (also spelled Noiodunum or Noviodunum), the capital of the ancient Gallic tribe of the Diablintes, later occupied and settled by Romans and called Civitas Diablintum. Noeodunum (Νοιόδουνον in Greek language sources), was the chief city of the Diablintes, or of the Aulircii Diaulitae, as the name appears in the Greek texts of Ptolemy (ii. 8. § 7). There is no doubt that the old Gallic name of the town was exchanged for that of the people, Diablintes - Civitas Diablintum. In a medieval document, referred to by D'Anville, the town's name is written Jublent, and thence comes the corrupted name Jublains. Jublains is a small place not far from Mayenne, where Roman remains have also been discovered.

A name "Nudionnum" occurs in the Theodosian Table between Araegenus (modern Vieux in Calvados) and Subdinnum (modern Le Mans), and it is marked as a capital town. It appears to be the Noeodunum of the Diablintes, hence Jublains.

In an excavation in London a writing tablet was found with a note about a slave girl from Jublains. It read:

‘Vegetus, assistant slave of Montanus the slave of the August Emperor, has bought the girl Fortunata, by nationality a Diablintian, for 600 denarii. She is warranted healthy and not liable to run away ...’

== See also ==
- Jublains archeological site
- Communes of the Mayenne department
