= List of châteaux in the Pays-de-la-Loire =

This article is a list of châteaux in Pays de la Loire, France.

== Loire-Atlantique ==
In the former duchy of Brittany

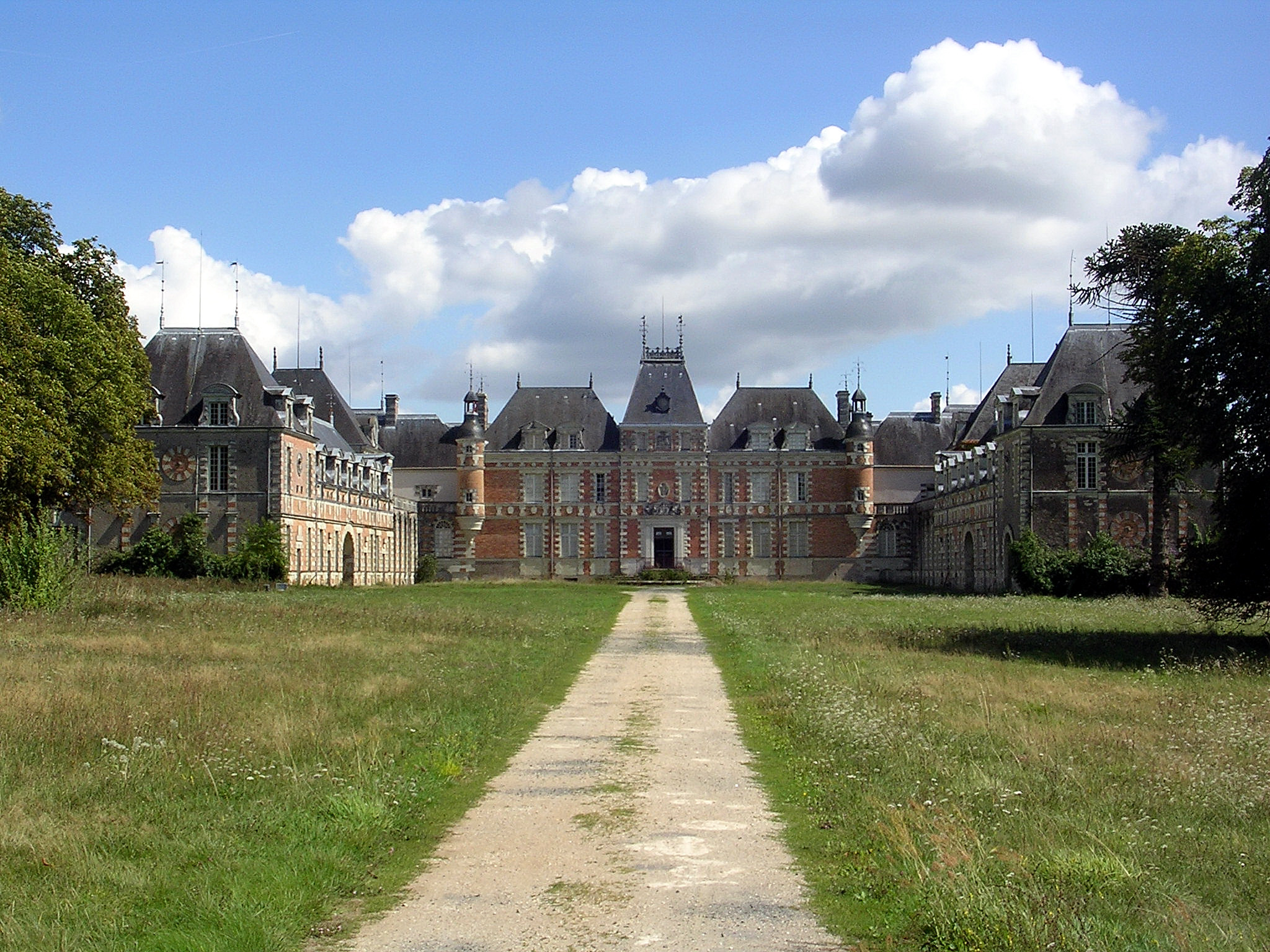
Château de Clermont

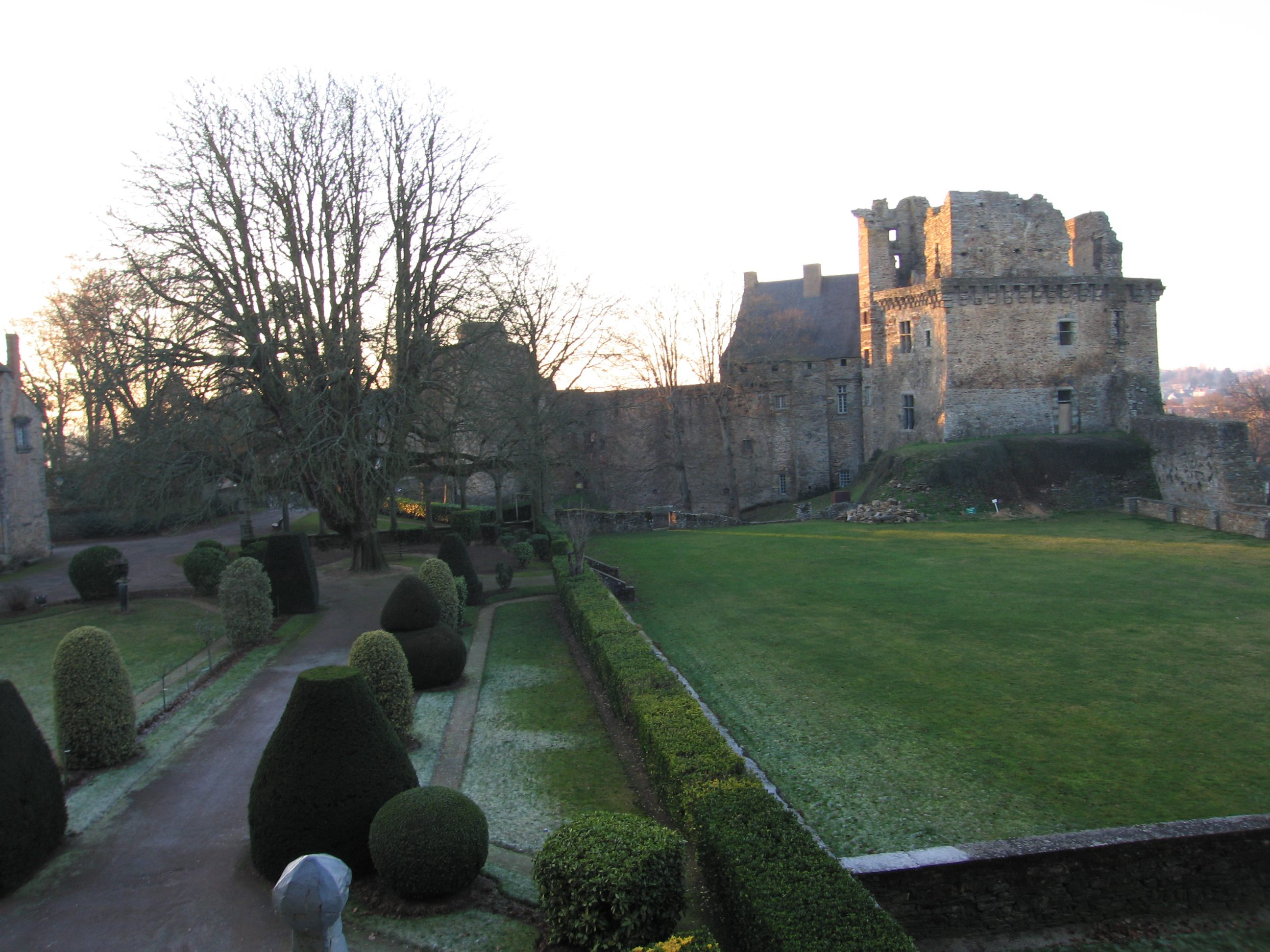
Château de Châteaubriant

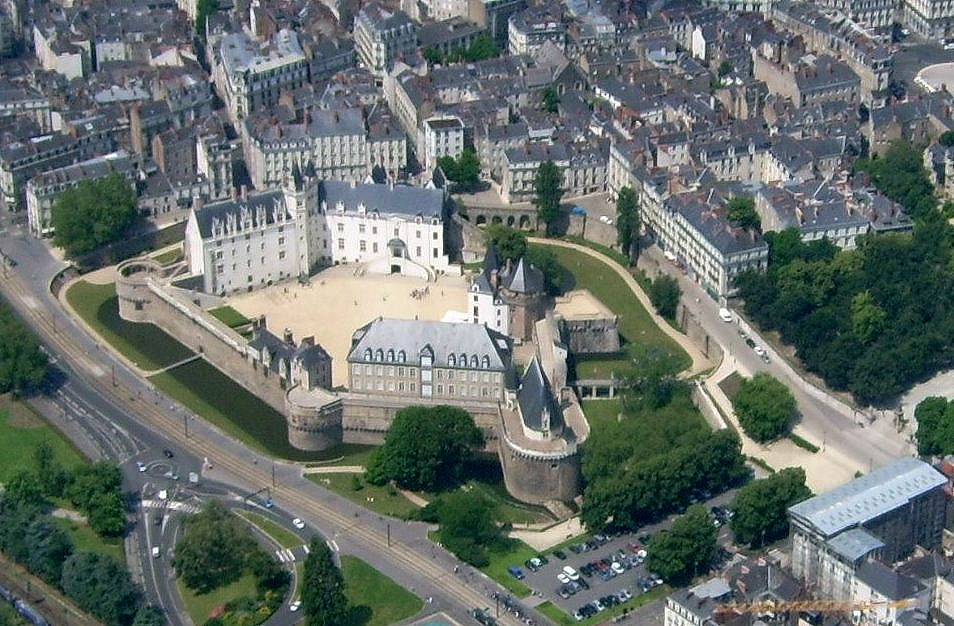
aerial view of the Château des ducs de Bretagne, Nantes

- Château d'Ancenis, in Ancenis
- Château de la Bégraisiere, in Saint-Herblain
- Château de Blain, in Blain
- Château de Bois Chevalier, in Legé
- Château de Bois-Briand, in Nantes
- Château du Bois-Rouaud, in Chéméré
- Château du Bouffay destroyed in the 19th century, in Nantes
- Château de la Bourgonnière destroyed in 2006, in Saint-Herblain
- Château de la Bretesche, in Missillac
- Château de Briord, in Port-Saint-Père
- Château de Campbon, in Campbon
- Château de Caratel, in Louisfert
- Château de Careil, in Guérande
- Château de Carheil, in Plessé
- Château de Chassay, in Sainte-Luce-sur-Loire
- Château de Châteaubriant, in Châteaubriant
- Château de Château-Thébaud, Château-Thébaud
- Château de Chavagne, in Sucé-sur-Erdre
- Château de Clermont, au Cellier
- Château de Clisson, in Clisson
- Château de Conquereuil, in Conquereuil
- Château des ducs de Bretagne, in Nantes
- Château de l' Épinay, in Carquefou
- Château de la Frémoire, in Vertou
- Château de la Freudière, in La Chevrolière
- Château de la Gascherie, in La Chapelle-sur-Erdre
- Château de Gilles de Rais, in Machecoul
- Château de Goulaine, in Haute-Goulaine
- Château du Goust, in Malville (voir Le Goust)
- Château du Grand-Blottereau, in Nantes
- Château de Granville, in Port-Saint-Père
- Château de la Guibourgère, in Teillé
- Château de Launay, in Sucé-sur-Erdre
- Château de Lucinière, in Joué-sur-Erdre
- Château de la Madeleine, in Varades
- Château Mercœur, in Indre
- Château de la Mesnerie, in La Chapelle-sur-Erdre
- Château de la Motte-Glain, in La Chapelle-Glain
- Château de la Noë de Bel Air, in Vallet
- Château de l'Oiselinière, in Gorges
- Tour d'Oudon, in Oudon
- Château de la Pinelais, in Saint-Père-en-Retz
- Château du Plessis, in Casson
- Château du Plessis, in Pont-Saint-Martin
- Château du Plessis, in Saint-Aubin-des-Châteaux
- Château du Plessis-de-Vair, in Anetz
- Château du Plessis-Mareil, in Saint-Viaud
- Château de Pornic, in Pornic
- Château de Portillon, in Vertou
- Château de la Rairie, in Pont-Saint-Martin
- Château de Ranrouët, in Herbignac
- Château de Retail, in Legé
- Château Saint-Clair, in Derval
- Château de Saint-Mars-de-Coutais, in Saint-Mars-de-Coutais
- Château de Saint-Mars-la-Jaille, in Saint-Mars-la-Jaille
- Château de la Seilleraye, in Carquefou
- Château de Thouaré-sur-Loire, in Thouaré-sur-Loire
- Logis de la Touche, in La Limouzinière
- Château de la Touche, in Nozay
- Château de la Tour, in Orvault
- Château de la Villejégu, in Couffé
- Château de Villeneuve, in Pornichet
- Château de la Vrillière, in La Chapelle-Basse-Mer

== Maine-et-Loire ==
Former province of Anjou

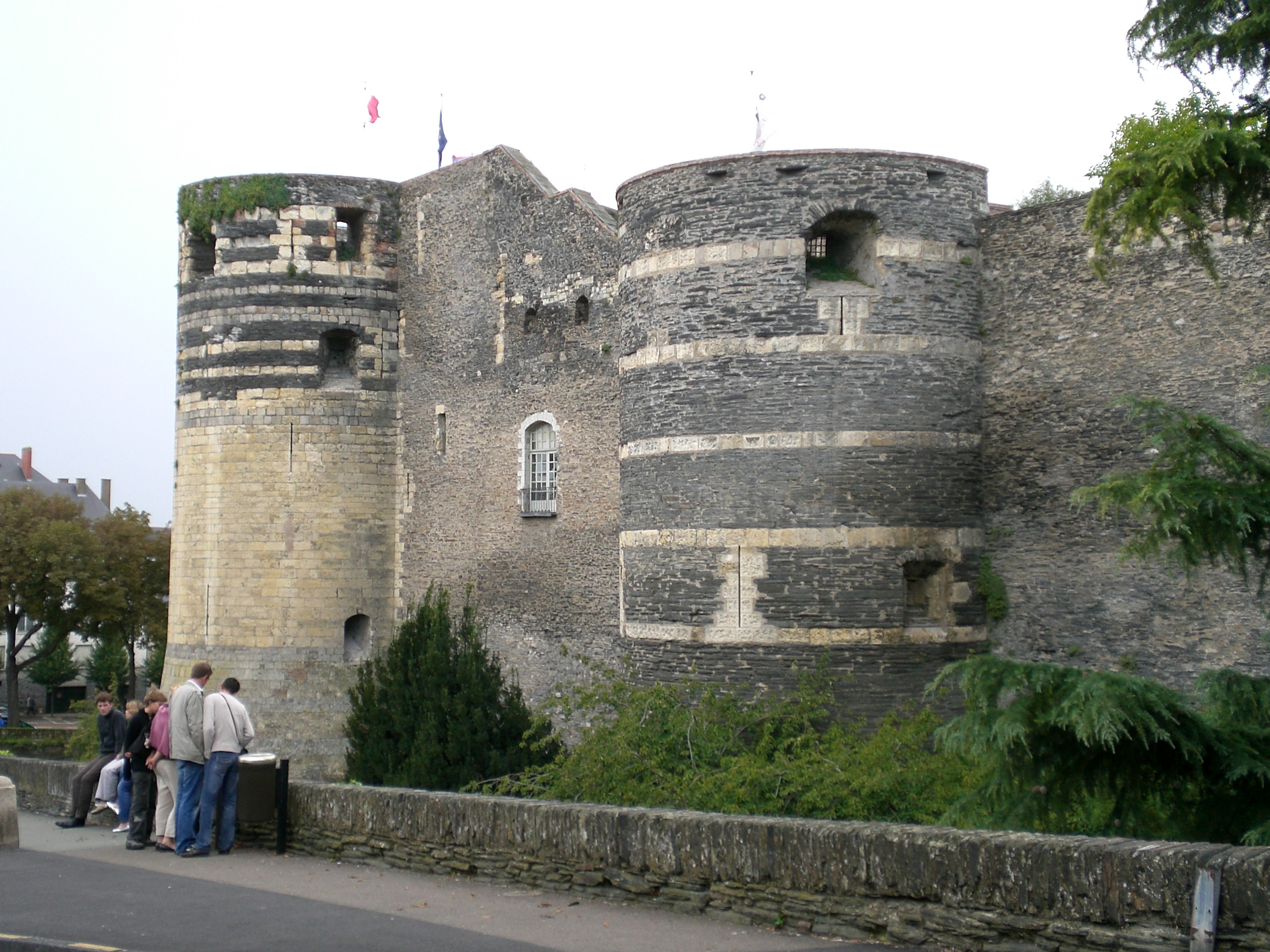
Rempart du château d'Angers

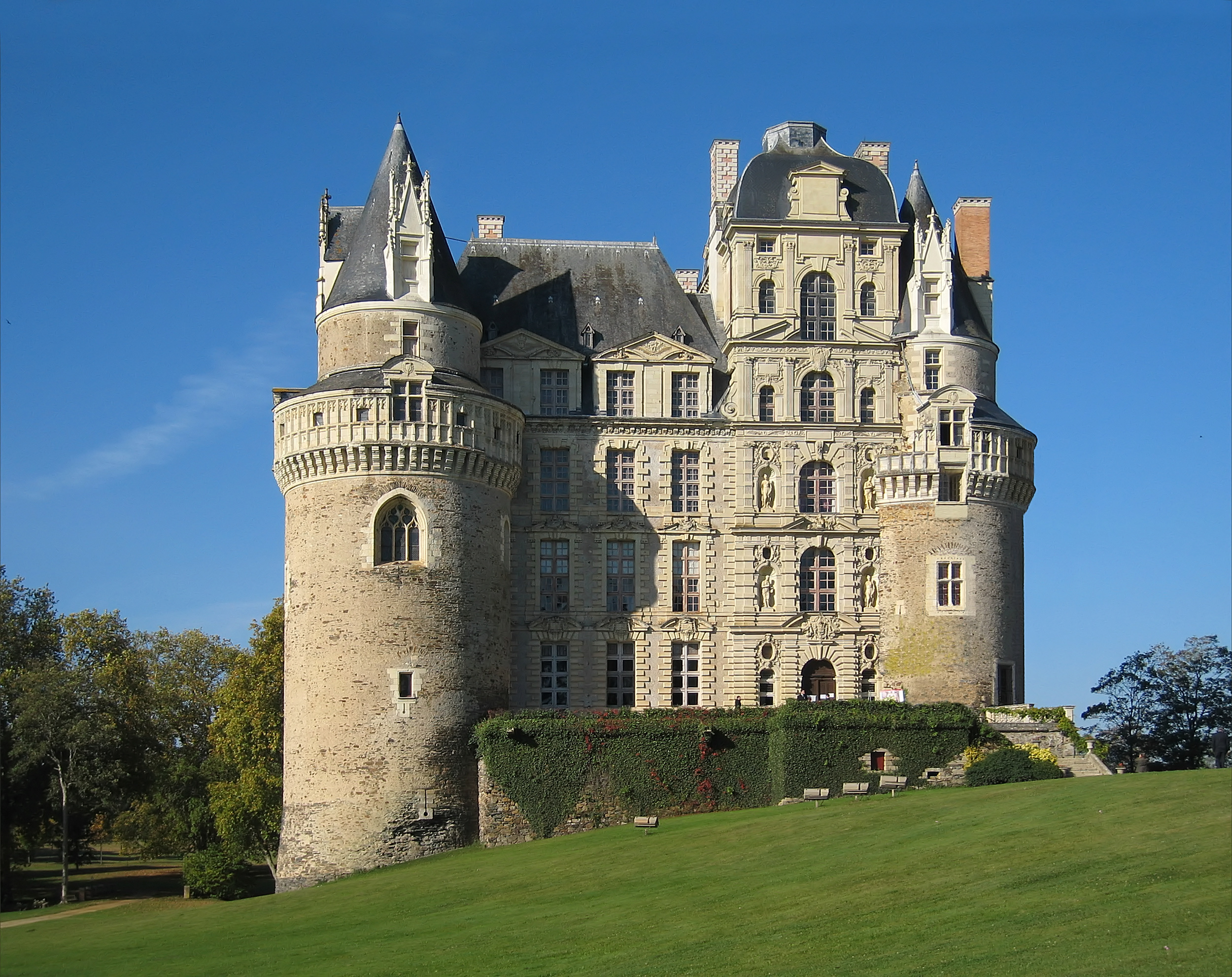
Château de Brissac

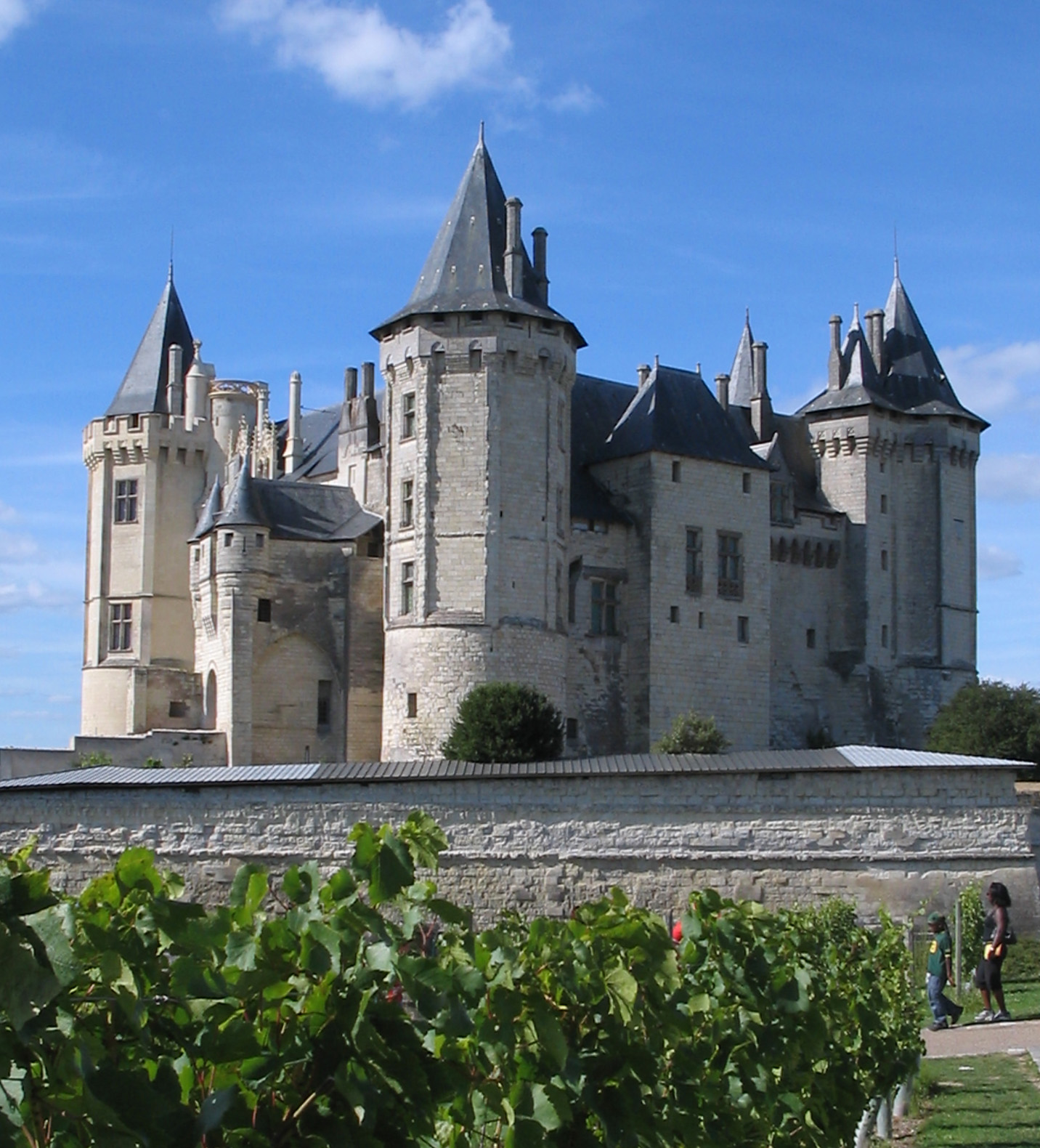
Château de Saumur

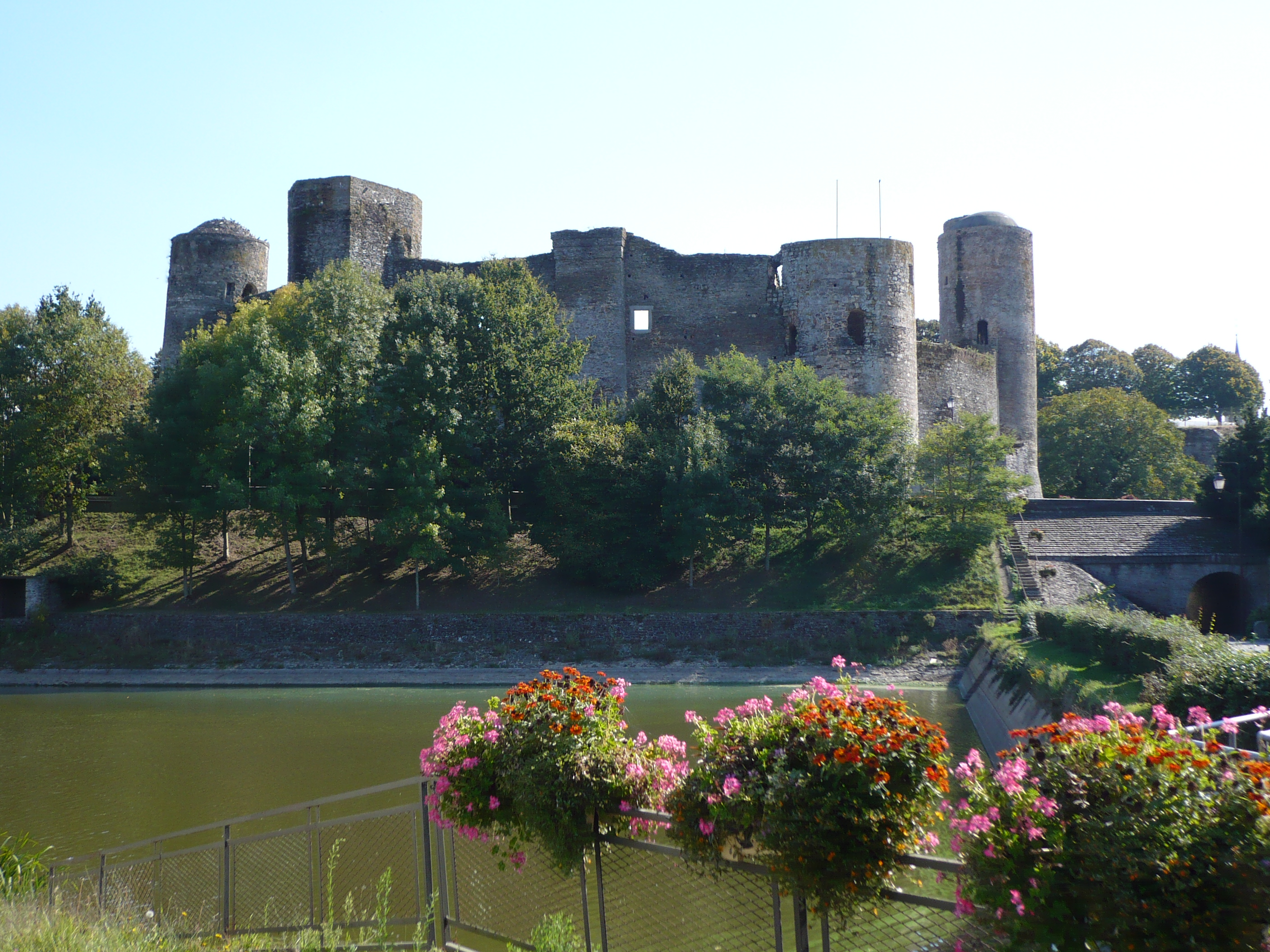
Château médiéval de Pouancé

- Château d'Angers, in Angers
- Château de la Beuvrière Grez-Neuville, in Grez-Neuville
- Château de Boumois, in Saint-Martin-de-la-Place
- Château de Bourmont, in Freigné
- Château de Brézé, in Brézé
- Château de Brissac, in Brissac-Quincé
- Château La Cailleterie, in La Meignanne 18th century
- Château de Challain-la-Potherie, in Challain-la-Potherie 19th century
- Château de Champtocé, in Champtocé-sur-Loire 13th century
- Château La Goujonnaie, in La Meignanne 18th century et 19th century
- Château de Grésillon, in Baugé 18th century
- Château de Martigné-Briand, in Martigné-Briand
- Château de Montgeoffroy, in Mazé
- Château de Montreuil-Bellay, in Montreuil-Bellay
- Château de Montsoreau, in Montsoreau
- Château de Noizé, in Soulaines-sur-Aubance
- Château de Pignerolle in Saint-Barthélemy-d'Anjou
- Château du Plessis-Bourré, in Écuillé
- Château du Plessis-Macé, au Plessis-Macé
- Château médiéval de Pouancé, in Pouancé
- Château Saint-Quentin, in La Meignanne 19th century
- Château Saint-Venant, in La Meignanne 19th century
- Château de Saumur, in Saumur
- Château de Serrant, in Saint-Georges-sur-Loire
- Château de la Turmelière, in Liré
- Château du Verger, in Seiches-sur-le-Loir
- Château de Villeneuve, in Martigné-Briand
- Château de Villeneuve, in Souzay-Champigny

== Mayenne ==
Former county of Maine

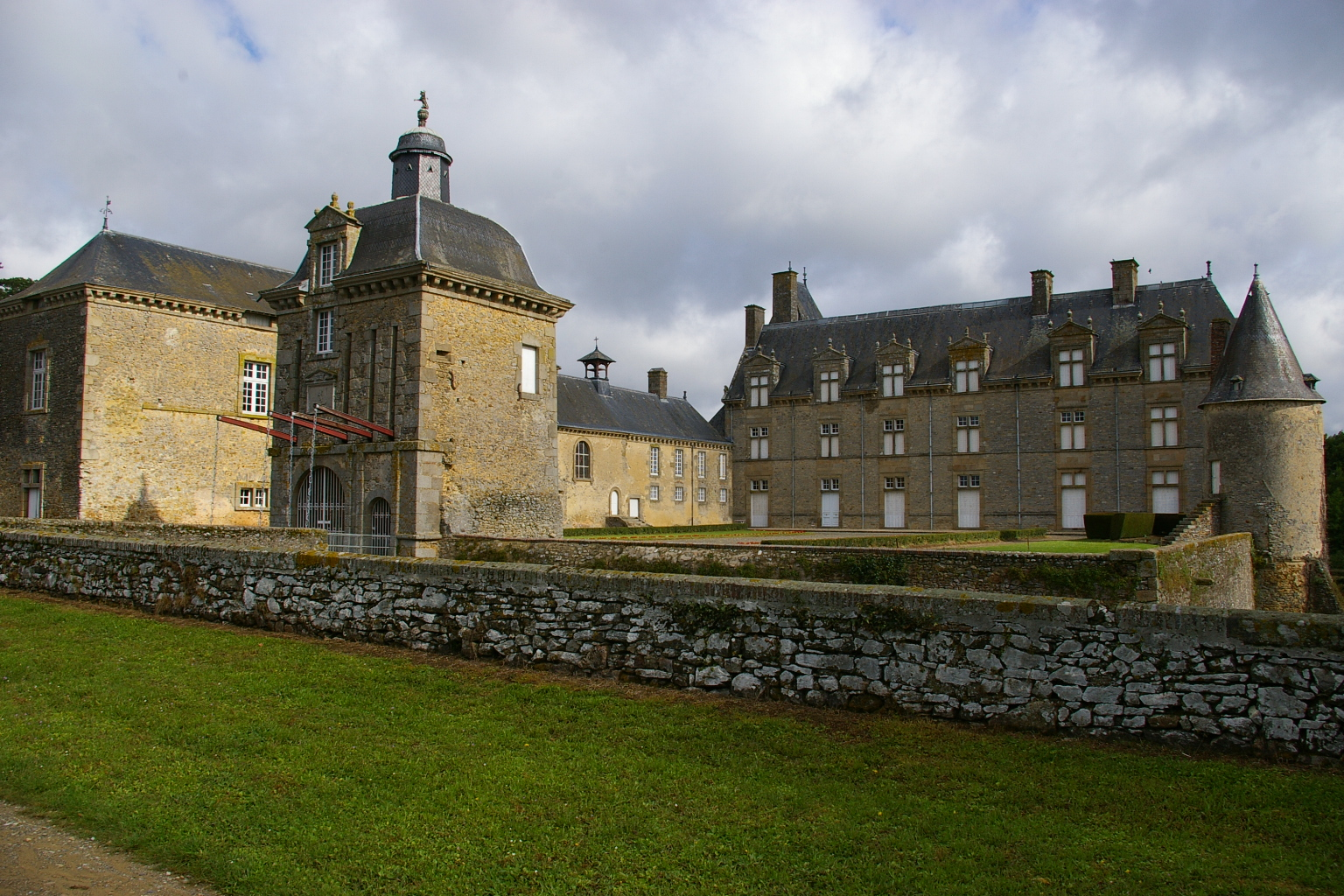
Château de Montecler

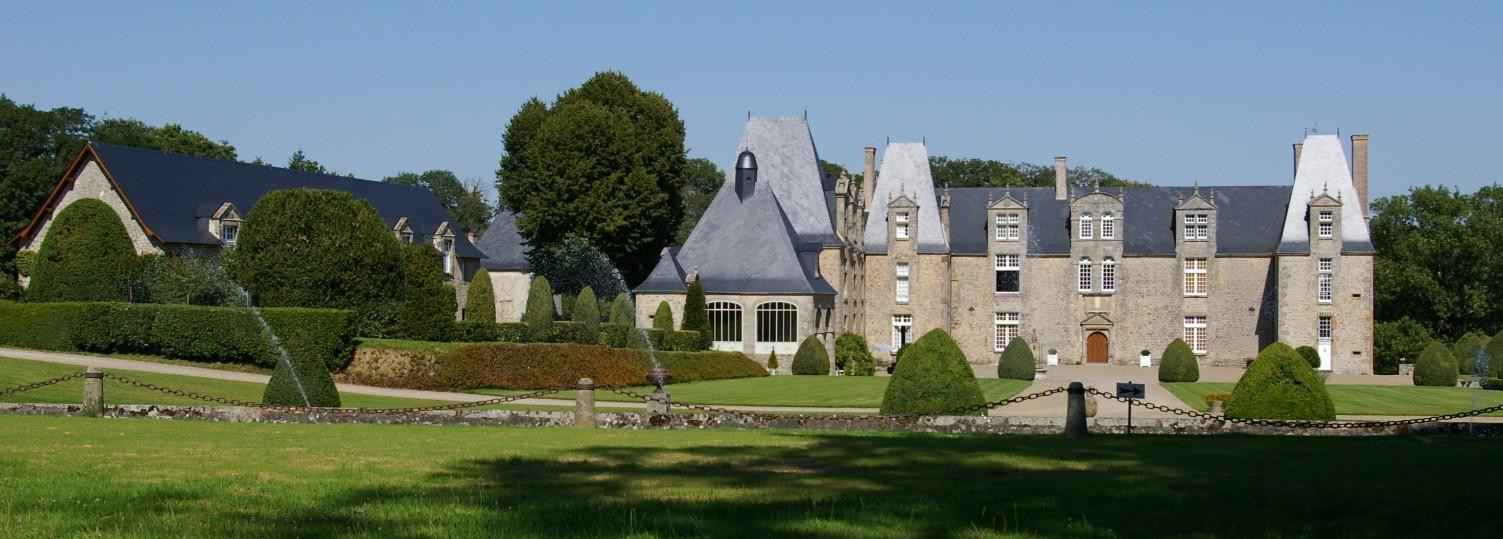
Château de la Roche-Pichemer

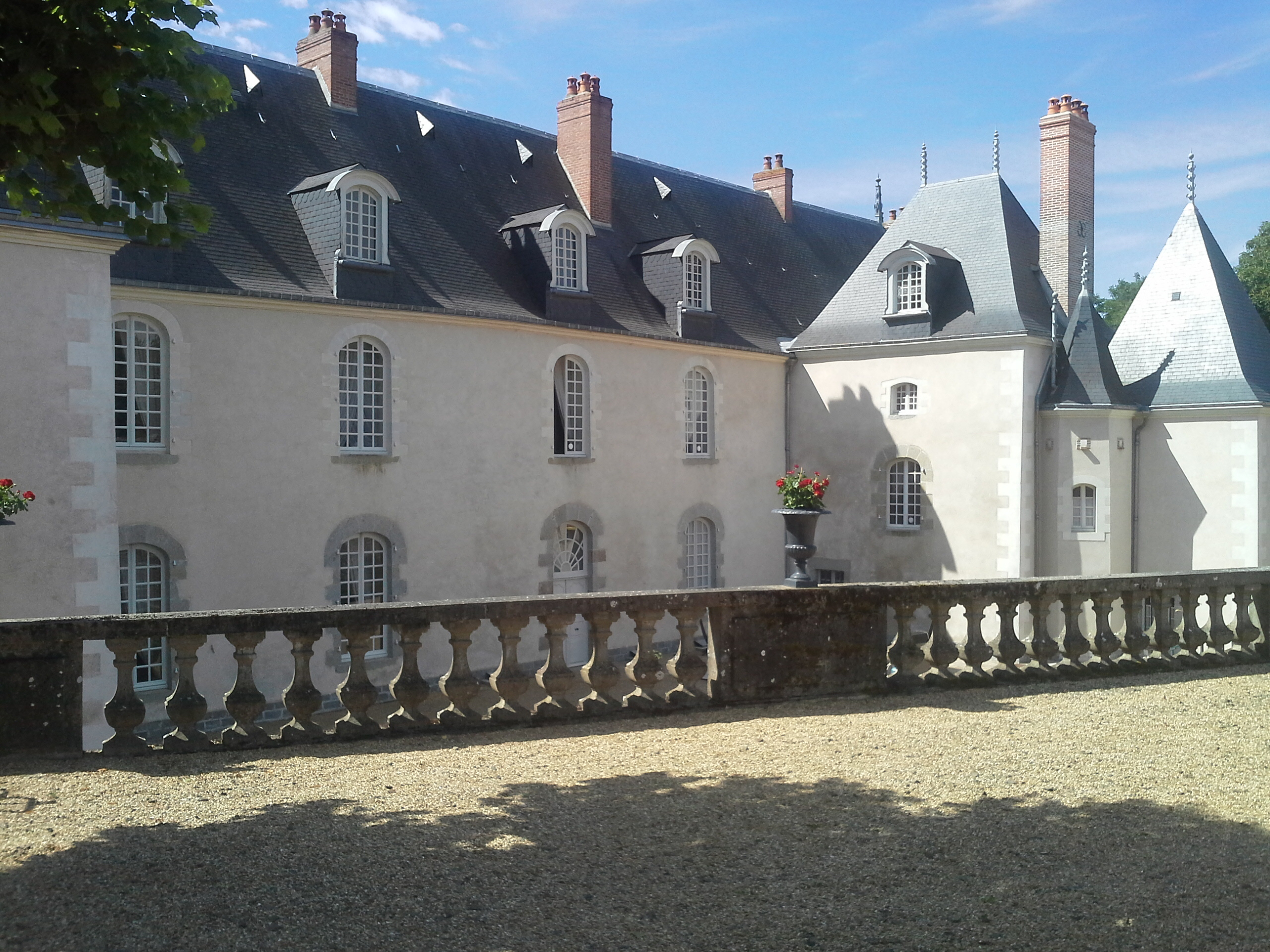
North façade of Château de Hauterive

- Château d'Ampoigné, in Ampoigné
- La Barbottière, in Ahuillé
- Château du Bas du Gast, in Laval
- Camp de Beugy, in Sainte-Suzanne
- Château du Bois Thibault, in Lassay-les-Châteaux
- Château de la Boissivière, in Argenton-Notre-Dame
- Château de Bouillé, in Torcé-Viviers-en-Charnie
- Château de Bourgon, in Montourtier
- Château de Champfleury, in Arquenay
- Château les Courans, in Longuefuye
- Château de la Courbe de Brée, in Brée
- Château de Courtaliéru, in Vimarcé
- Château de Craon, in Craon
- Château de l'Escoublère in Daon
- Château de la Fautraise, in Argenton-Notre-Dame
- Château de La Feuillée, in Alexain
- Château de Foulletorte, in Saint-Georges-sur-Erve
- Château de Fresnay, au Bourgneuf-la-Forêt
- Château de la Goinière, in Andouillé
- Château de Goué, in Fougerolles-du-Plessis
- Château de Hauterive, in Argentré
- Château de Hauteville, in Charchigné
- Château de la Lande de Niafles, in Niafles
- Château de Lassay, in Lassay-les-Châteaux
- Château de Laval, in Laval
- Château de Lévaré, in Levaré
- Château de la Marie, in Alexain
- Château de Mayenne, in Mayenne
- Château de Montchevrier, in Nuillé-sur-Vicoin
- Château de Montecler, in Châtres-la-Forêt
- Château de Montesson, in Bais
- Château de Montflaux, in Saint-Denis-de-Gastines
- Château de Montjean, in Montjean
- Château de Mortiercrolles, in Saint-Quentin-les-Anges
- Château de la Motte-Daudier, in Niafles
- Château de Pannard, in Ernée
- Château de la Patrière, in Courbeveille
- Château du Pin de Préaux, in Préaux
- Château du Plessis de Cosmes, in Cosmes
- Château du Plessis-Buret, in Sainte-Gemmes-le-Robert
- Château de Poligné, in Bonchamp-lès-Laval
- La Provôterie, in Ahuillé
- Château de la Roche-Pichemer, in Saint-Ouën-des-Vallons
- Château du Rocher, in Mézangers
- Château de la Rongère, in Saint-Sulpice
- Château de Sainte-Suzanne, in Sainte-Suzanne
- Donjon de Sainte-Suzanne, in Sainte-Suzanne
- Château de Saint-Ouen de Chemazé, in Chemazé
- Château de Senonnes, in Senonnes
- Château de la Sionnière, in Argenton-Notre-Dame
- Château de Terchant, in Ruillé-le-Gravelais
- Château du Tertre, in Ambrières-les-Vallées
- Château de Thévalles, in Chémeré-le-Roi
- Château de Thorigné-en-Charnie, in Thorigné-en-Charnie
- Château de Thubœuf, in Nuillé-sur-Vicoin
- Château de Thuré, in La Bazouge-des-Alleux
- Château de Trancalou, in Deux-Évailles
- Château de Varennes-l'Enfant, in Épineux-le-Seguin
- Château des Ifs, in Montsûrs
- Château du Verger de Montigné, in Montigné-le-Brillant
- La Vieux-Cour, in Ahuillé
- Château de la Villatte, in Montigné-le-Brillant

== Sarthe ==
Former county of Maine

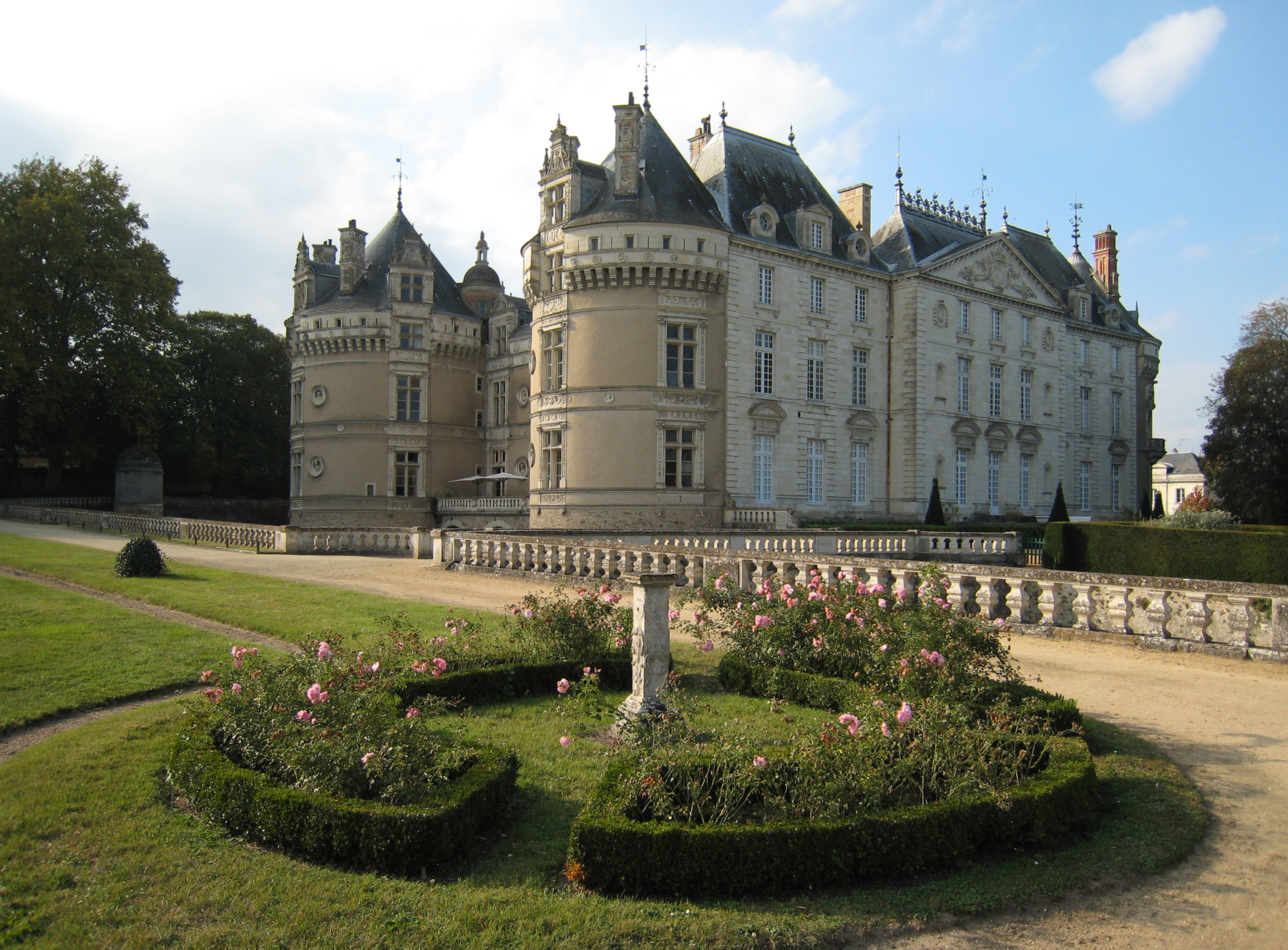
Château du Lude

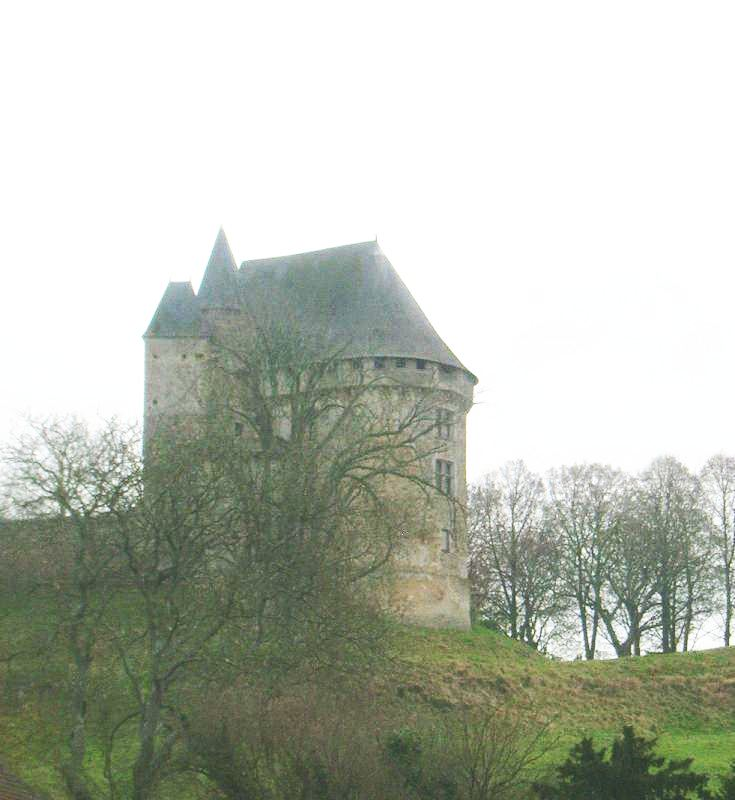
Château de Ballon

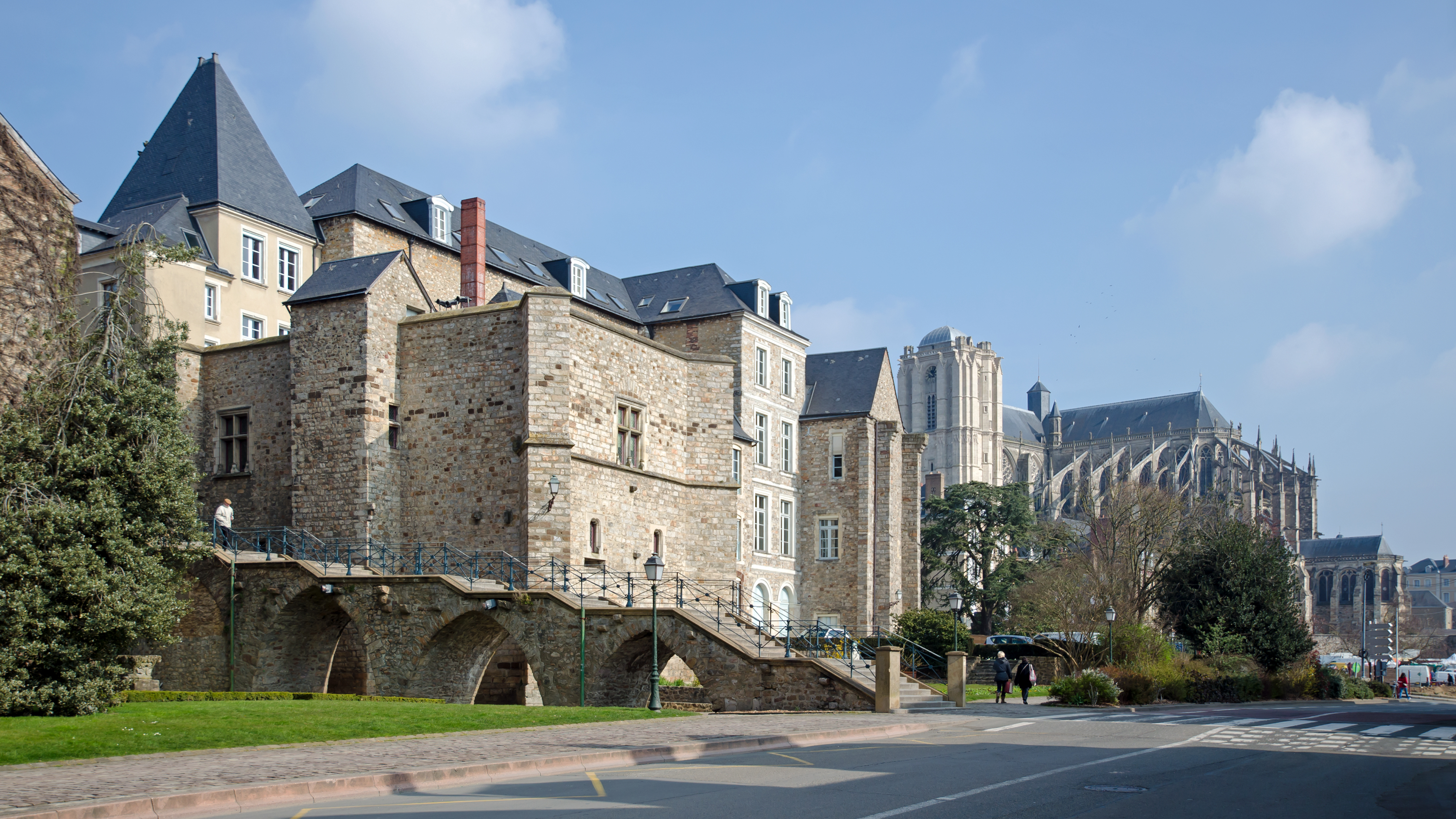
Palais des Comtes du Maine

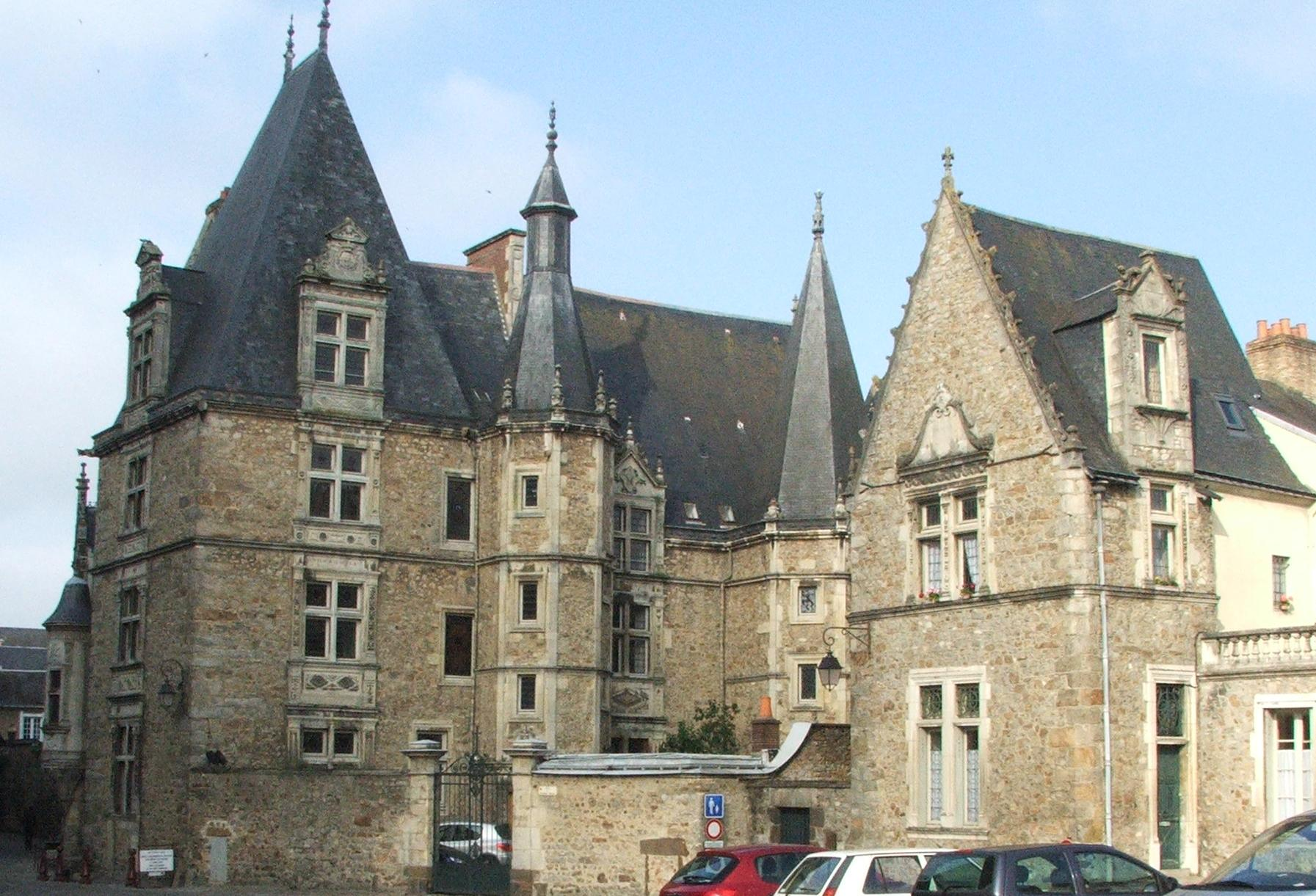
Palais du Grabatoire

- Château d'Aillières-Beauvoir, in Aillières-Beauvoir
- Château d'Ardenay, in Ardenay-sur-Mérize
- Château des Aulnays, in Torcé-en-Vallée
- Château de Ballon, in Ballon, XI^{e}
- Château de la Balluère, in Pirmil, XIV^{e}
- Château de La Barre, in Conflans-sur-Anille
- Château de Bazouges sur le Loir, in Bazouges-sur-le-Loir, XV^{e}
- Château de Bellefille, in Chemiré-le-Gaudin, XI^{e}
- Château de Bénéhard, in Chahaignes, XVI^{e}
- Château de Bezonnais, in Écommoy
- Château de Brusson, in Soulitré
- Château du Mans, XI^{e}
- Château du Gué de Maulny, au Mans, XI^{e}
- Palais des Comtes du Maine, au Mans, XI^{e}
- Palais du Grabatoire, au Mans, XVI^{e} (palace)
- Chateau de Connerré, in Connerré
- Château de Courmenant, in Rouez-en-Champagne
- Château de Courtanvaux, in Bessé-sur-Braye, XV^{e} Gothique
- Château de Dehault, in Dehault
- Château des Etangs L'Archevêque, in Saint-Vincent-du-Lorouër, XVII^{e}
- Château de Gallerande, in Luché-Pringé
- Château du Grand-Lucé, au Grand-Lucé
- Château de La Grange-Moreau, in Vallon-sur-Gée
- Château des Gringrenières, in La Chapelle-d'Aligné, XVII^{e}
- Château de Launay, in Lombron
- Château du Levain
- Château du Lude, au Lude, XVIII^{e}
- Château de Malicorne, in Malicorne-sur-Sarthe, XII^{e}
- Château de Monhoudou, in Monhoudou, XV^{e} monument historique
- Château de Montbraye, in Parigné-l'Évêque
- Château de Montfort-le-Gesnois, in Montfort-le-Gesnois
- Château de Montmirail, in Montmirail, XV^{e}
- Château d'Oyré, in Clermont-Créans
- Château de Poncé, in Poncé-sur-le-Loir, XVI^{e},
- Château de Saint Paterne, in Saint-Paterne
- Château des Salles, in Mayet
- Château de Sillé, in Sillé le Guillaume, XV^{e}
- Château de Vaulogé, in Fercé-sur-Sarthe
- Château de Viré en Champagne, in Viré-en-Champagne, XII^{e}

== Vendée ==
Former province of Poitou

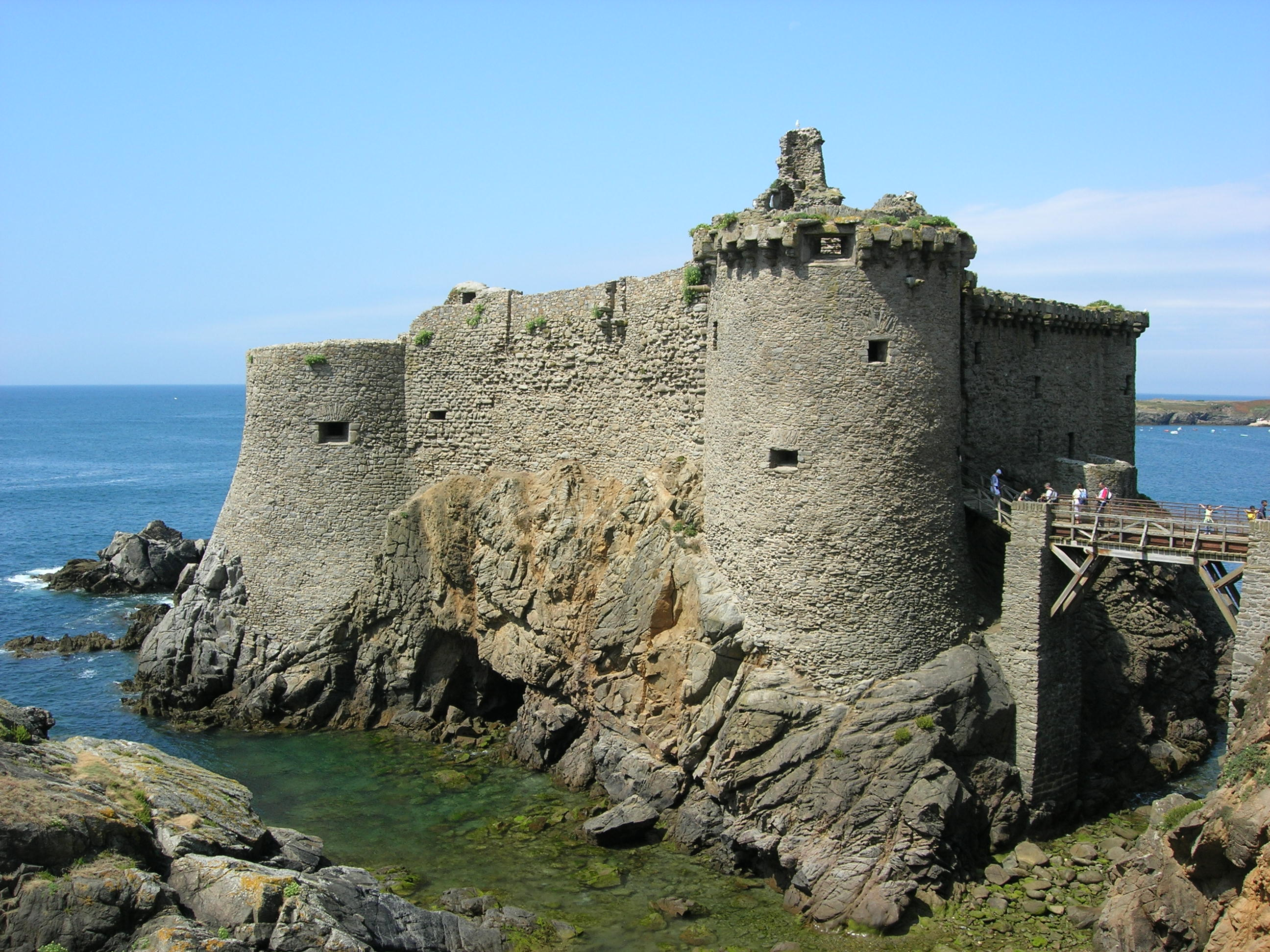
Vieux-château de l'Île d'Yeu

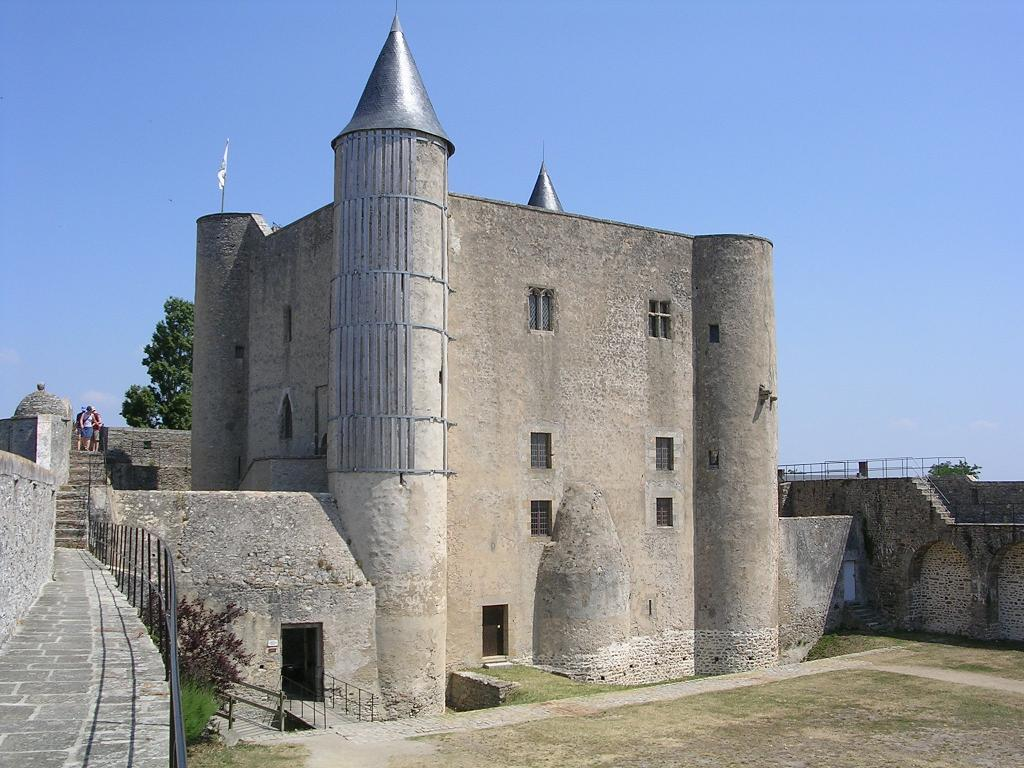
Château de Noirmoutier

- Château de La Roche-sur-Yon Destroyed during rebuilding the napoleonic era.
- Château d'Apremont, in Apremont
- Château de la Bijoire, in Saint-Vincent-sur-Graon
- Château du Breuil, in Saint-Denis-la-Chevasse
- Château de la Cantaudière, in Moutiers-les-Mauxfaits
- Château de Commequiers, in Commequiers
- Château des Essarts, aux Essarts
- Château de La Flocellière, in Saint-Denis-la-Chevasse
- Château de la Guignardière, in Avrillé
- Tour Mélusine, in Vouvant
- Tour de Moricq, in Angles
- Château de Noirmoutier, in Noirmoutier
- Manoir de Ponsay, in Chantonnay
- Château de Pouzauges, in Pouzauges
- Puy du fou, aux Épesses
- Château de Saint-Denis-la-Chevasse, in Saint-Denis-la-Chevasse
- Château de Sainte-Hermine, in Sainte-Hermine
- Château de Talmont, in Talmont-Saint-Hilaire
- Château de Terre Neuve, in Fontenay-le-Comte
- Château de Tiffauges, in Tiffauges
- Château de Châteaumur, in les Châtelliers-Châteaumur
- Château de La Vérie, in Challans
- Vieux-château de l'Île d'Yeu, in l'Île-d'Yeu

== See also ==
- List of castles in France
- List of castles in the Pays de la Loire
