= Saint-Céneré =

- Part of Montsûrs
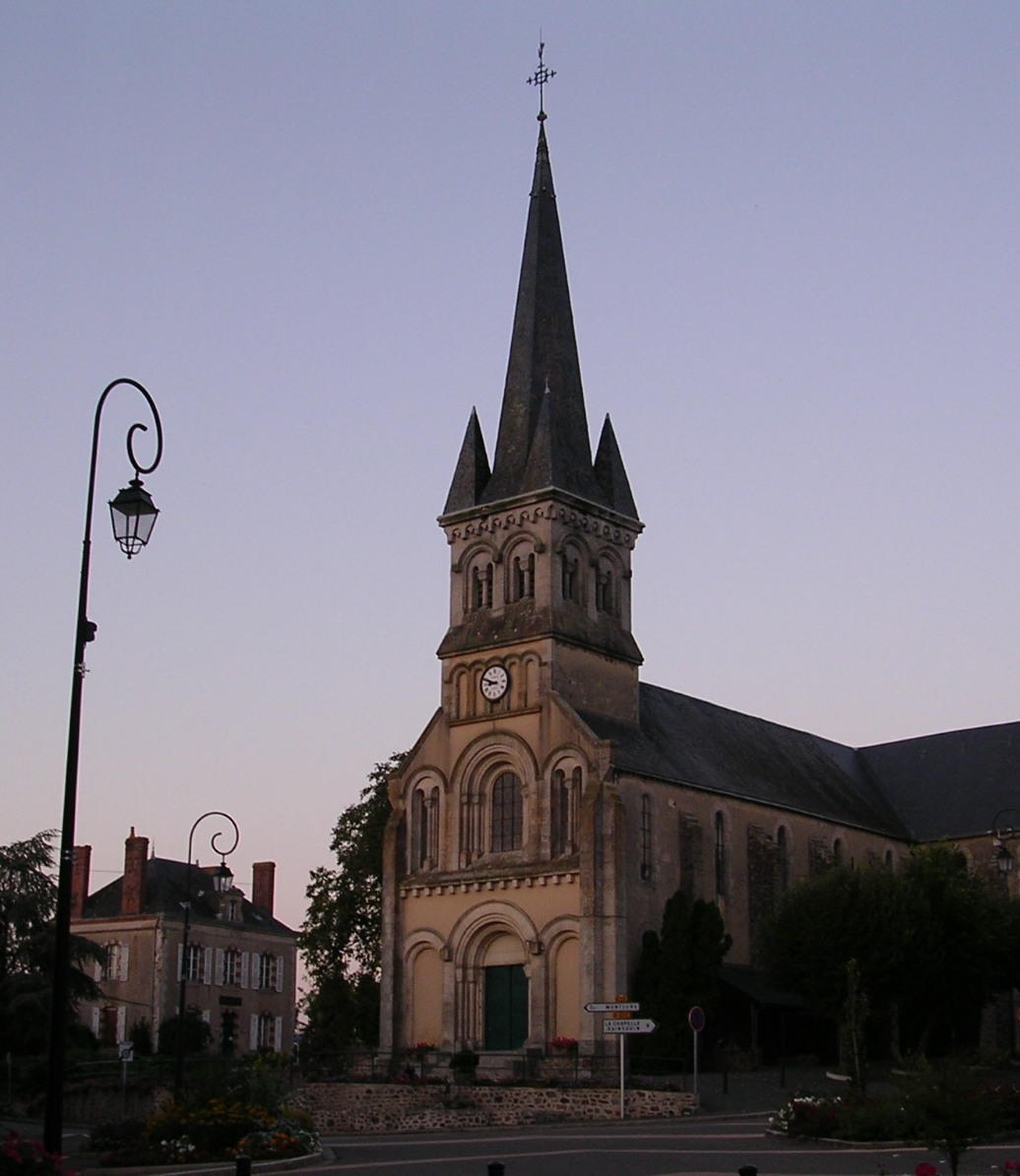
- The church in Saint Cénéré
- Location of Saint-Céneré
- Location within France Location within Pays de la Loire
- Coordinates: 48°07′21″N 0°35′37″E
- Country: France
- Region: Pays de la Loire
- Department: Mayenne
- Arrondissement: Mayenne
- Canton: Meslay-du-Maine
- Commune: Montsûrs
- Area^{1}: 18.89 km^{2} (7.29 sq mi)
- Elevation: 192 m (630 ft)
- Highest elevation: 128 m (420 ft)
- Lowest elevation: 62 m (203 ft)
- Population (2022): 489
  - Density: 25.9/km^{2} (67.0/sq mi)
- Time zone: UTC+01:00 (CET)
  - Summer (DST): UTC+02:00 (CEST)
- Postal code: 53150
- ^{1} French Land Register data, which excludes lakes, ponds, glaciers > 1 km^{2} (0.386 sq mi or 247 acres) and river estuaries.

Saint-Céneré (French pronunciation: [sɛ̃ sɛnʁe]) is a former commune in the Mayenne department and Pays de la Loire region of France. It gets its name from Cénéré de Saulges.

== Background ==
On 1 January 2017, it was merged into the new commune Montsûrs-Saint-Céneré. On 1 January 2019 the comune was unified with Deux-Évailles, Montourtier and Saint-Ouën-des-Vallons, and the new municipality took the name of Montsûrs. Its population was 489 in 2022.

== See also ==
- Communes of the Mayenne department
