= Saint Paterne - Le Chevain =

- Commune
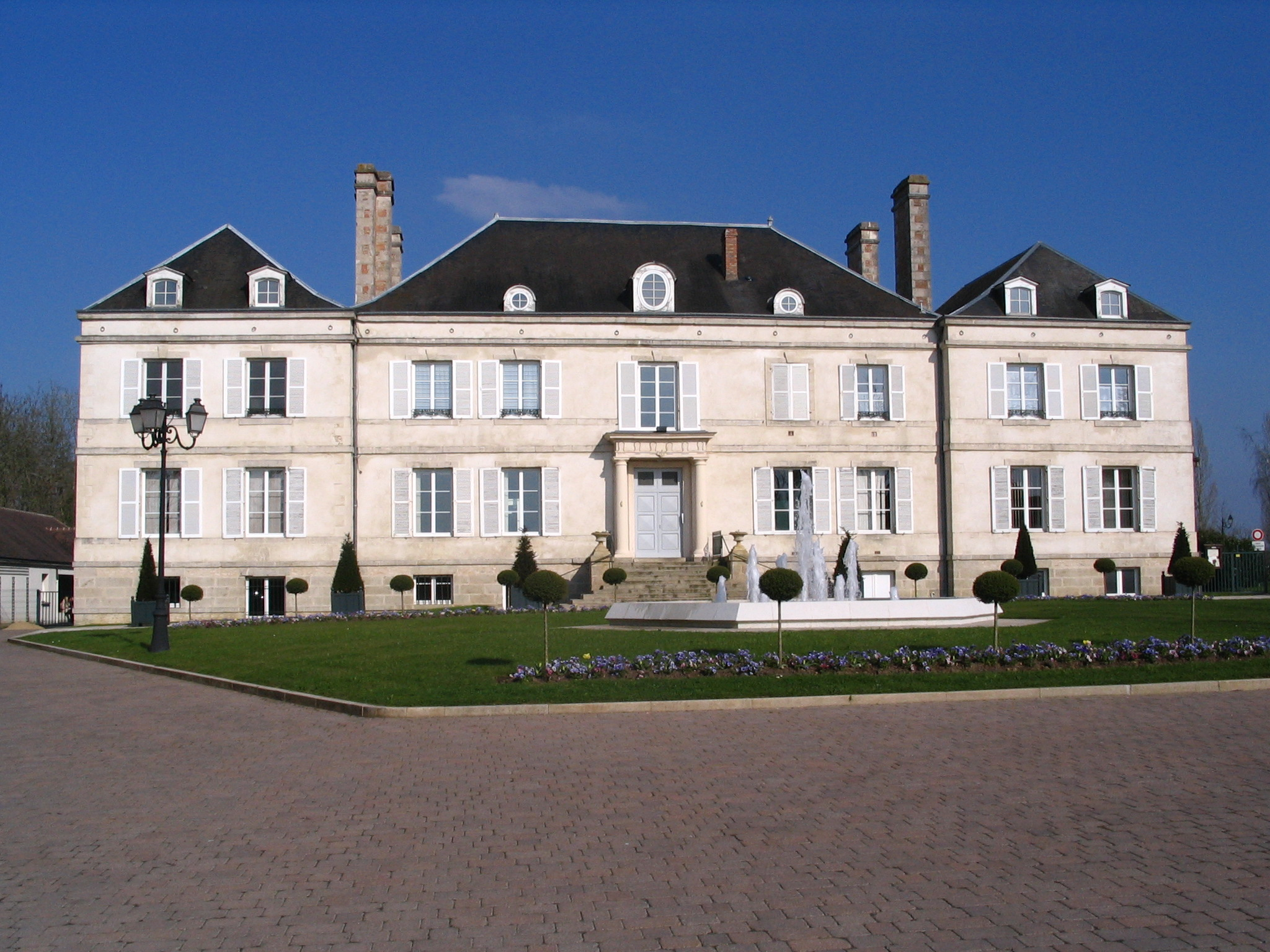
- The Chateau of le Chevain
- Location of Saint Paterne - Le Chevain
- Location within France Location within Pays de la Loire
- Coordinates: 48°24′58″N 0°06′40″E
- Country: France
- Region: Pays de la Loire
- Department: Sarthe
- Arrondissement: Mamers
- Canton: Mamers
- Intercommunality: CU Alençon
- Area^{1}: 12.93 km^{2} (4.99 sq mi)
- Population (2023): 2,076
  - Density: 160.6/km^{2} (415.8/sq mi)
- Time zone: UTC+01:00 (CET)
  - Summer (DST): UTC+02:00 (CEST)
- INSEE/Postal code: 72308 /72610
- ^{1} French Land Register data, which excludes lakes, ponds, glaciers > 1 km^{2} (0.386 sq mi or 247 acres) and river estuaries.

Saint Paterne - Le Chevain is a commune in the department of Sarthe, northwestern France. The municipality was established on 1 January 2017 by merger of the former communes of Saint-Paterne (the seat) and Le Chevain.

== Geography ==
The commune is made up of the following collection of villages and hamlets, Le Chevain, Le Grand Ozé, La Basse Sente, La Rue d'Ancinnes, La Chaussée and Saint-Gilles.

The commune along with another 32 communes is part of a 3,503 hectare, Natura 2000 conservation area, called the Haute vallée de la Sarthe.

The river Sarthe flows through the commune.

== Population ==
Population data refer to the area corresponding with the commune as of January 2025.

Historical population
Year	Pop.	±% p.a.
1968	982	—
1975	1,270	+3.74%
1982	1,847	+5.50%
1990	2,206	+2.25%
1999	2,249	+0.21%
2007	2,242	−0.04%
2012	2,199	−0.39%
2017	2,120	−0.73%
2023	2,076	−0.35%
Source: INSEE

== Points of Interest ==
=== National Heritage sites ===
- Maison au cabinet peint - a house that contains an eighteenth century mural depicting a panoramic landscape, which was listed as a Monument historique in 1997.

== Twin towns – sister cities ==
Saint Paterne - Le Chevain was twinned with Uffington for 25 years before being dissolved in 2016.

== See also ==
- Communes of the Sarthe department
