= Arboretum de Montsûrs =

Arboretum and nature walk in Pays de la Loire, France

Coordinates: 48.1347°N 0.5525°W

The Arboretum de Montsûrs is an arboretum and nature walk located at the Place des Anciens-Combattants, Montsûrs, Mayenne, Pays de la Loire, France. It consists of a loop trail (almost 1 km) along the River Jouanne, with an information panel, and is open daily without charge.

== See also ==
- List of botanical gardens in France
