= Château de Hauterive =

Castle in Mayenne department, France

Coordinates: 48°05′38″N 0°38′58″W

- Château de Hauterive (French)
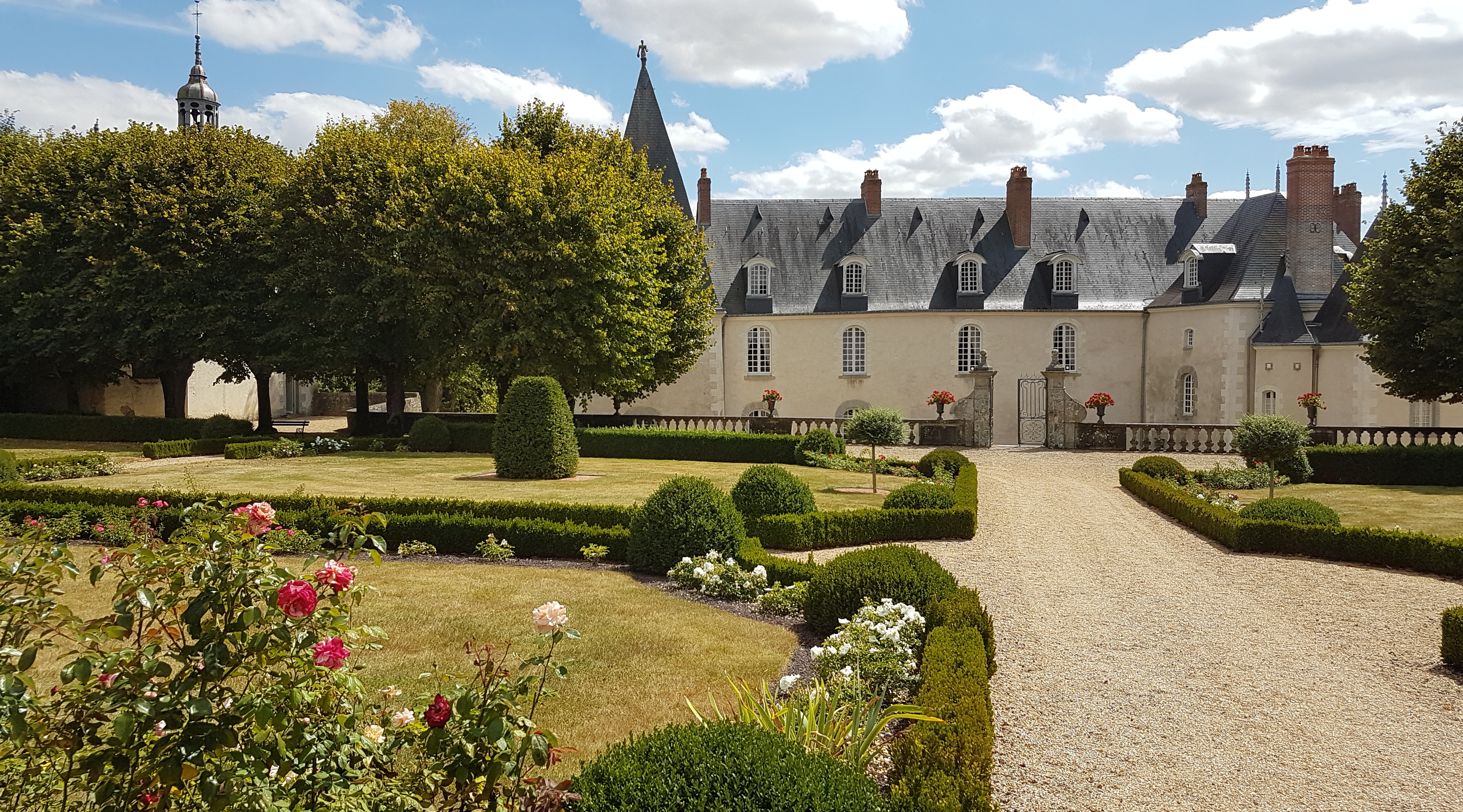
- Château de Hauterive
- Interactive map of Château de Hauterive
- Type: Château
- Location: Argentré, Mayenne, France

History
- Built: Medieval origins; largely rebuilt in the 18th century

Site notes
- Owner: Private

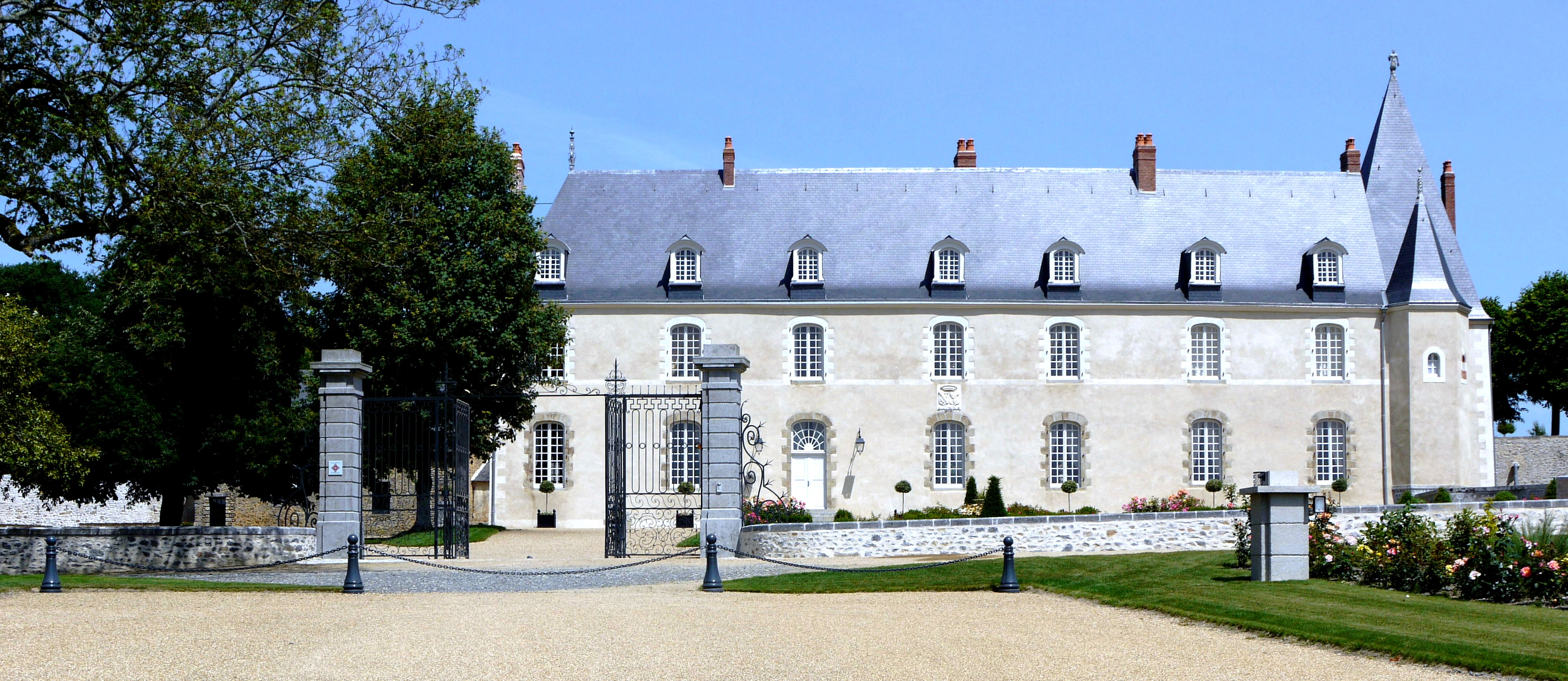
The Château d'Hauterive

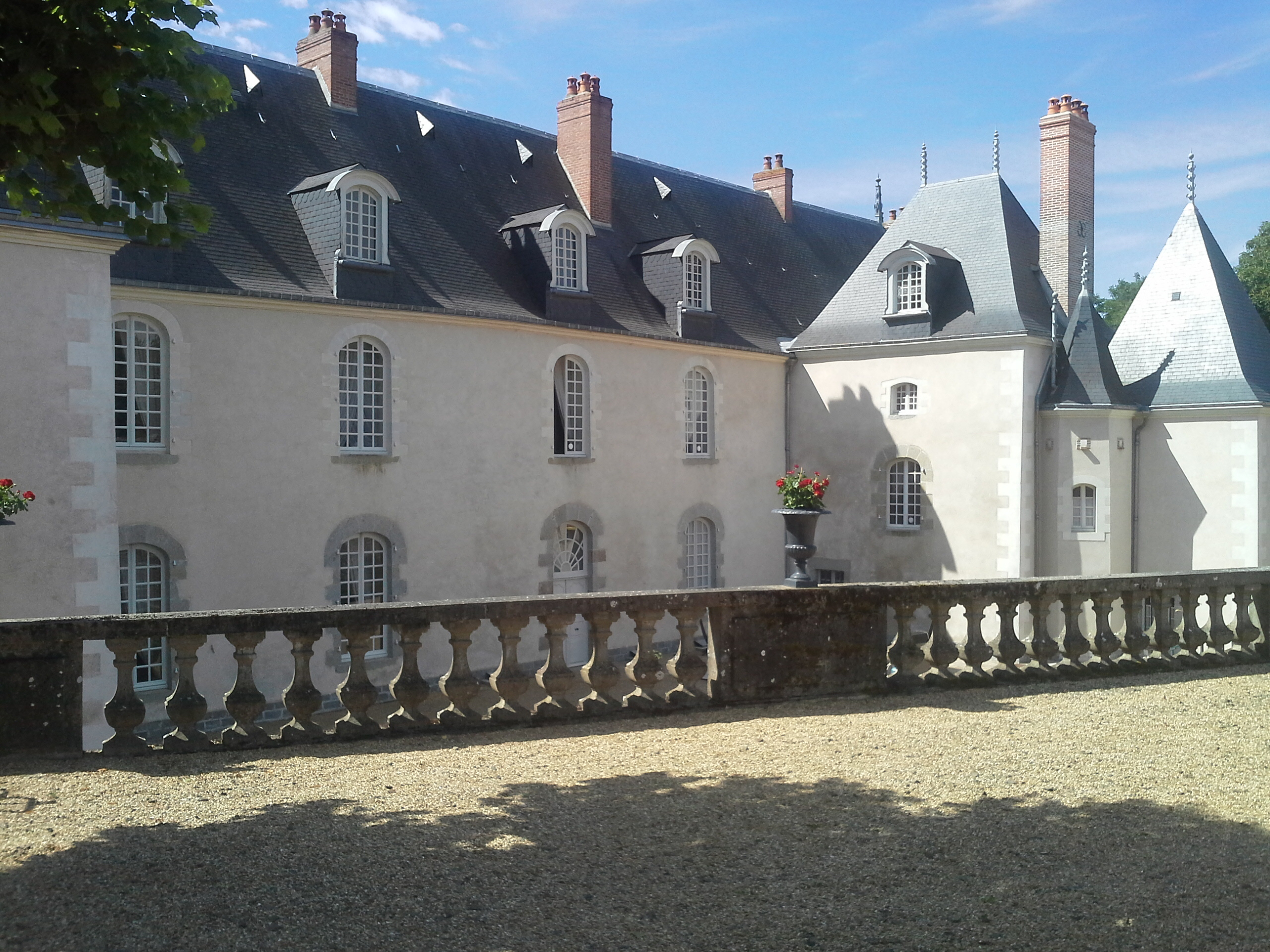
North façade of Château de Hauterive

Hauterive Castle (Château de Hauterive) is a castle located in Argentré, within the department of Mayenne. The castle has been a registered monument since March 13, 1989. Originally established as a medieval seigneurial manor, the estate evolved over several centuries into an aristocratic residence associated with several noble families, including the du Bellay, Hautefort, Berset, Fitzgerald, and Montalembert families.

Much of the château's present appearance dates from extensive eighteenth-century reconstruction campaigns undertaken by Jean-Baptiste Berset.

Château de Hauterive is included in the Route des Joyaux de la Mayenne, a heritage circuit highlighting notable historic châteaux, parks, and gardens within the department.

== History ==
=== Medieval origins ===
The earliest known reference to Hauterive dates to 1209, when Guillaume d’Hauterive acknowledged holding the manor from the lords of Bazougers in exchange for mounted military service.

During the medieval period, Hauterive functioned as a fortified seigneury with agricultural lands and feudal jurisdiction. Ownership later passed to the Villiers family. In 1508, Thomine de Villiers, Lady of La Flotte and Hauterive, founded the château chapel.

=== du Bellay and Hautefort connections ===
During the Renaissance period, the château became associated with the House of du Bellay, an influential noble family of western France. Members of the family included:

- Jean du Bellay, cardinal and diplomat,
- Guillaume du Bellay, military adviser to Francis I,
- and Joachim du Bellay, poet and member of La Pléiade.

One member of the Hauterive branch was René du Bellay II, who married Catherine le Voyer de Lignerolles. Through later marriage alliances, the estate became connected to the Hautefort family. Their descendants included Marie de Hautefort, later a prominent figure at the court of Louis XIII.

Catherine Le Voyer de Lignerolles (1571–1657), known as Madame de la Flotte-Hauterive, became associated with Château de Hauterive through her marriage to René du Bellay II, Baron de la Flotte-Hauterive. A member of the French royal court, she served as a lady-in-waiting to Marie de Médicis and was later appointed dame d'atour to Anne of Austria, a position she held from 1630 until her death. She was also the grandmother and guardian of Marie de Hautefort, who was raised under her care after being orphaned in infancy and whom she later introduced at court.

=== Berset reconstruction ===
A major transformation of the château occurred in 1737, when the estate was purchased by Jean-Baptiste Berset, a wealthy banker and merchant from Laval who had acquired the office of Secrétaire du Roi under Louis XV.

Berset undertook extensive reconstruction work that largely created the château's present eighteenth-century appearance. The rebuilding campaign introduced formal façades, landscaped approaches, terraces, and architectural symmetry while integrating portions of earlier medieval structures.

Surviving features associated with this period include:

- the pigeon tower (fuie),
- the chapel,
- terraces,
- landscaped grounds,
- and estate wells.

=== French Revolution ===
During the Chouan uprising of the French Revolution, the château suffered significant damage. On 15 June 1795, Republican forces and looters attacked Hauterive, stripping furniture, windows, paneling, and decorative interiors.

Sébastien Berset d'Hauterives was a member of the Berset family that owned Château de Hauterive during the late eighteenth and early nineteenth centuries. The son of Jean Baptiste Berset, who acquired the estate in 1737, he was a notable landowner and political figure in Mayenne. During the French Revolution, members of the Berset d'Hauterives family were arrested during the Reign of Terror. According to Abbé Angot, Madame d'Hauterives was arrested at Château de Hauterive, where her husband later joined her, before the family was transferred with other prisoners to Chartres following the evacuation of Laval. Despite these events, Sébastien Berset d'Hauterives later returned to public life. Under the First French Empire, he was listed among the principal notables of the department of Mayenne and subsequently served as mayor of Argentré.

The château was later rebuilt and enlarged during the late eighteenth and nineteenth centuries. Additional nineteenth-century alterations included the construction of towers and other architectural embellishments.

=== Nineteenth and twentieth centuries ===
Through inheritance, the estate later passed into the Fitzgerald family and subsequently the House of Montalembert. French actor Thibault de Montalembert later recalled spending part of his childhood at the château before the property was sold in 1975.

=== Restoration ===
In 2007, the château was acquired by Patrick and Roxanne Longpré-Matton, who initiated an extensive restoration campaign involving structural stabilization, restoration of interiors, and recreation of historic gardens.

In 2025, the château was sold by Patrick and Roxanne Longpré-Matton to the American couple Melissa and Richard Bryant.

== Architecture ==
Principal features include:

- eighteenth-century façades
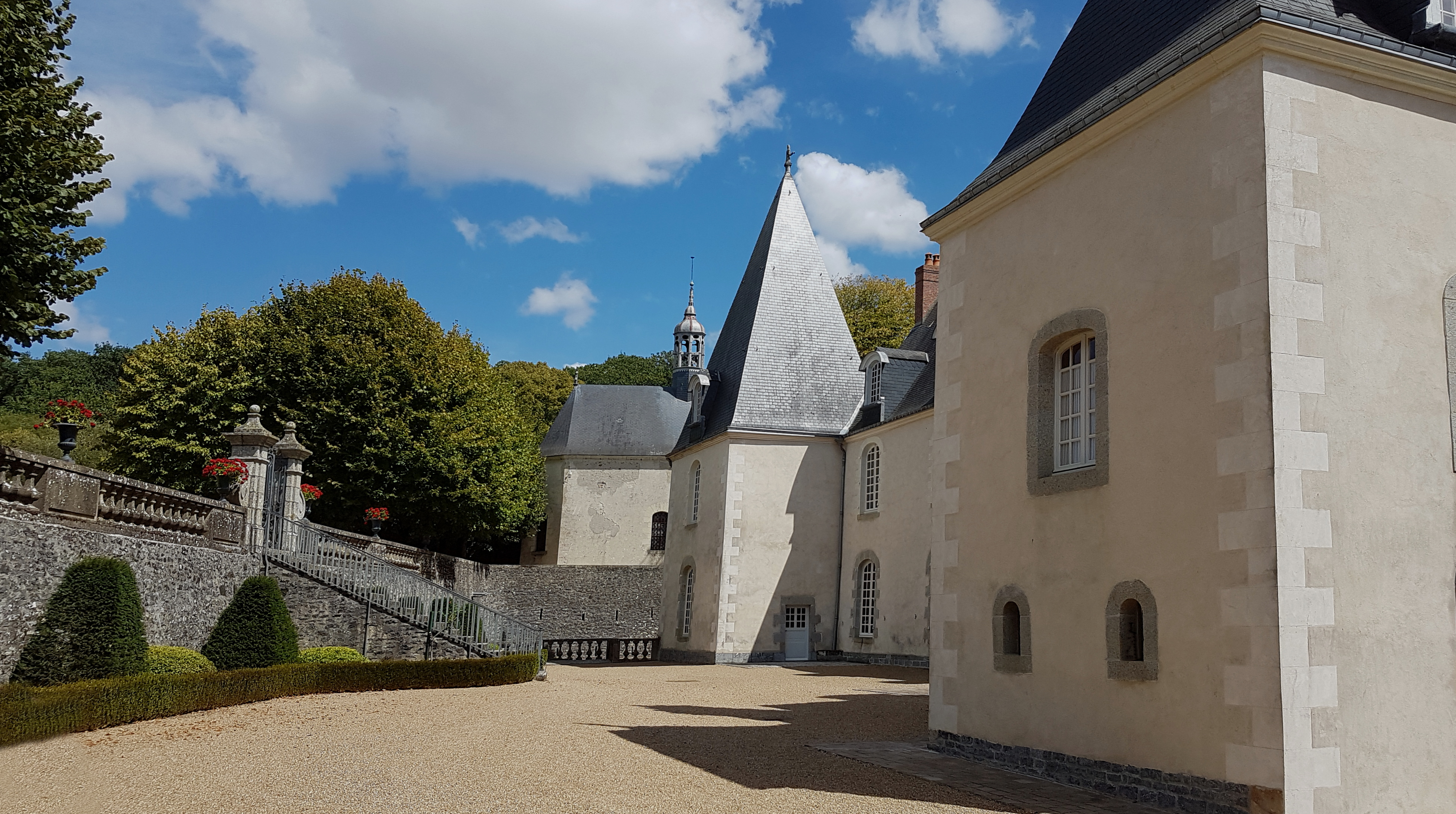
- View of Château de Hauterive and estate grounds
- chapel
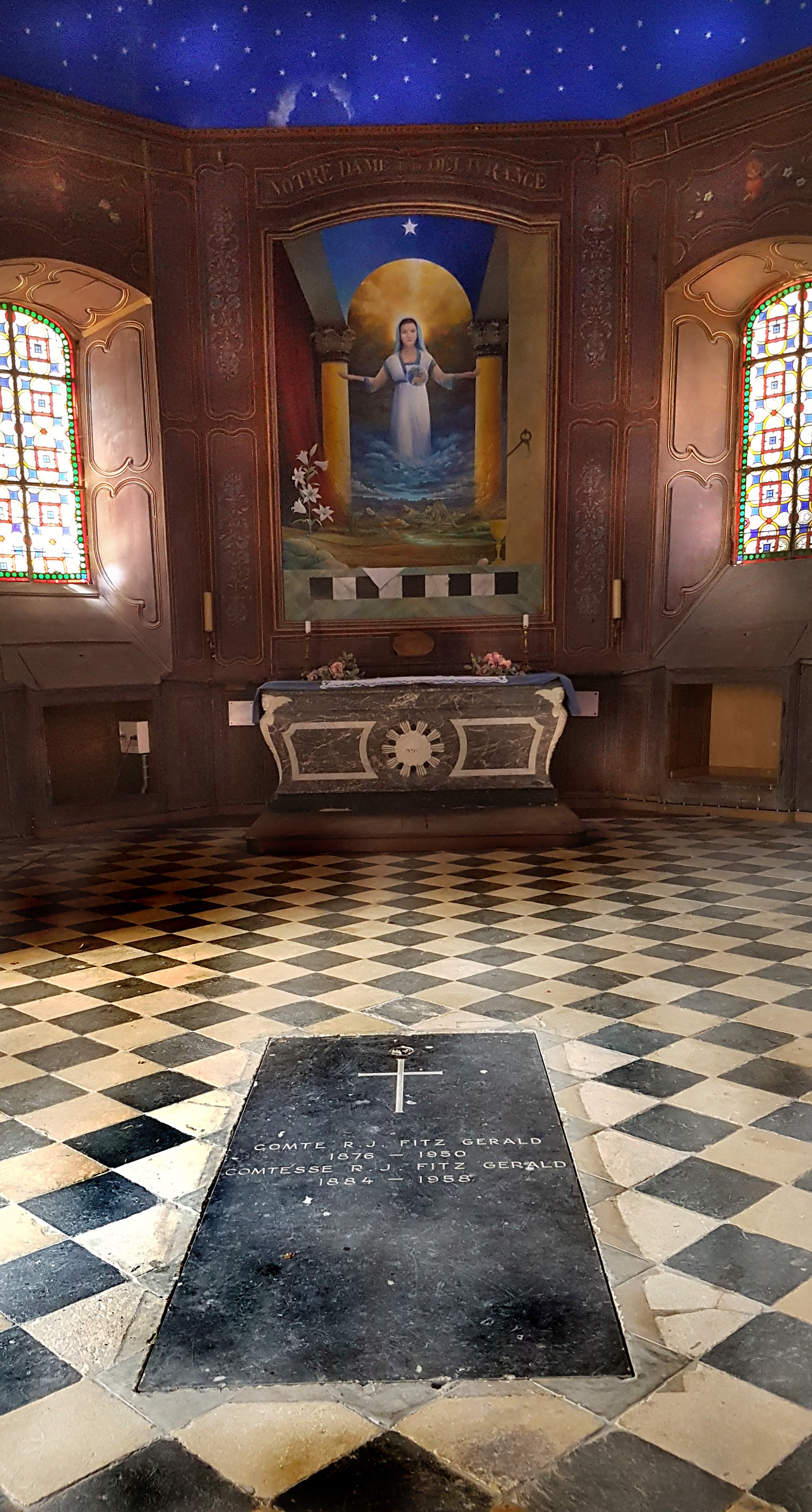
- Interior chapel and memorial tomb at Château de Hauterive
- formal terraces and a well
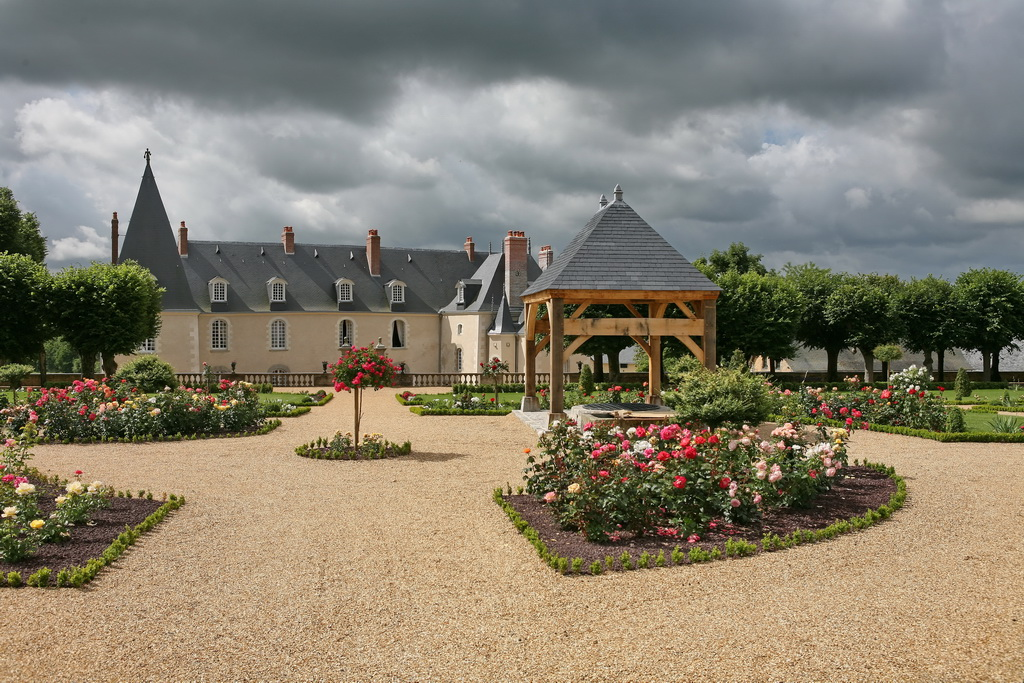
- Terraced gardens and landscaped grounds of the château
- landscaped grounds,
- a monumental pigeon tower and stables
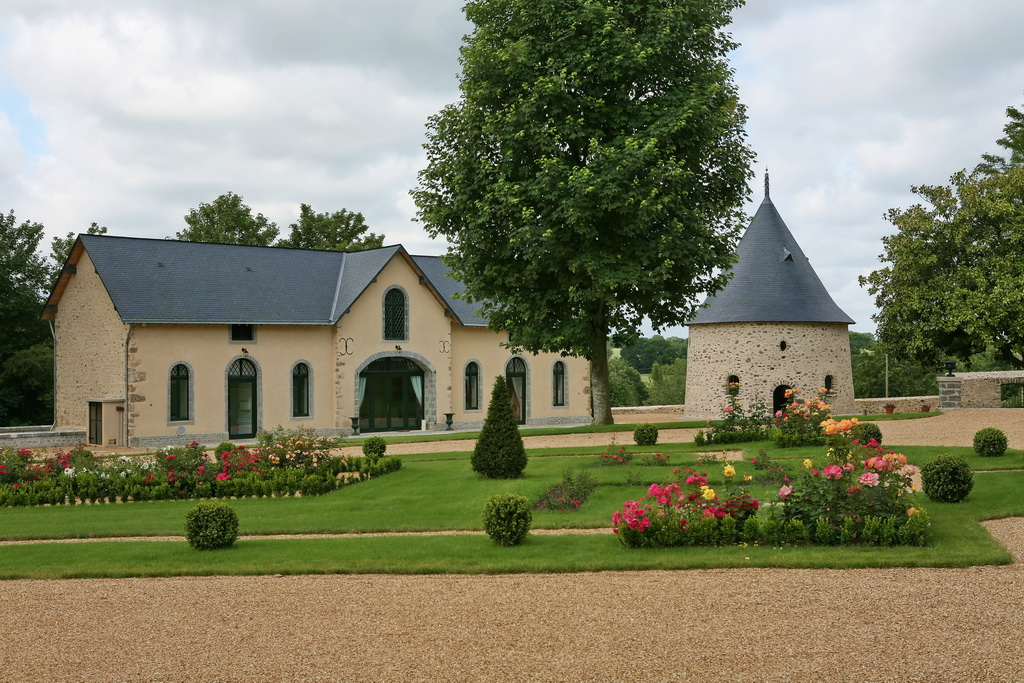
  Historic pigeon tower and stables
- and surviving estate outbuildings.

== See also ==
- List of châteaux in the Pays-de-la-Loire
