= Saint-Paterne =

- Part of Saint Paterne - Le Chevain
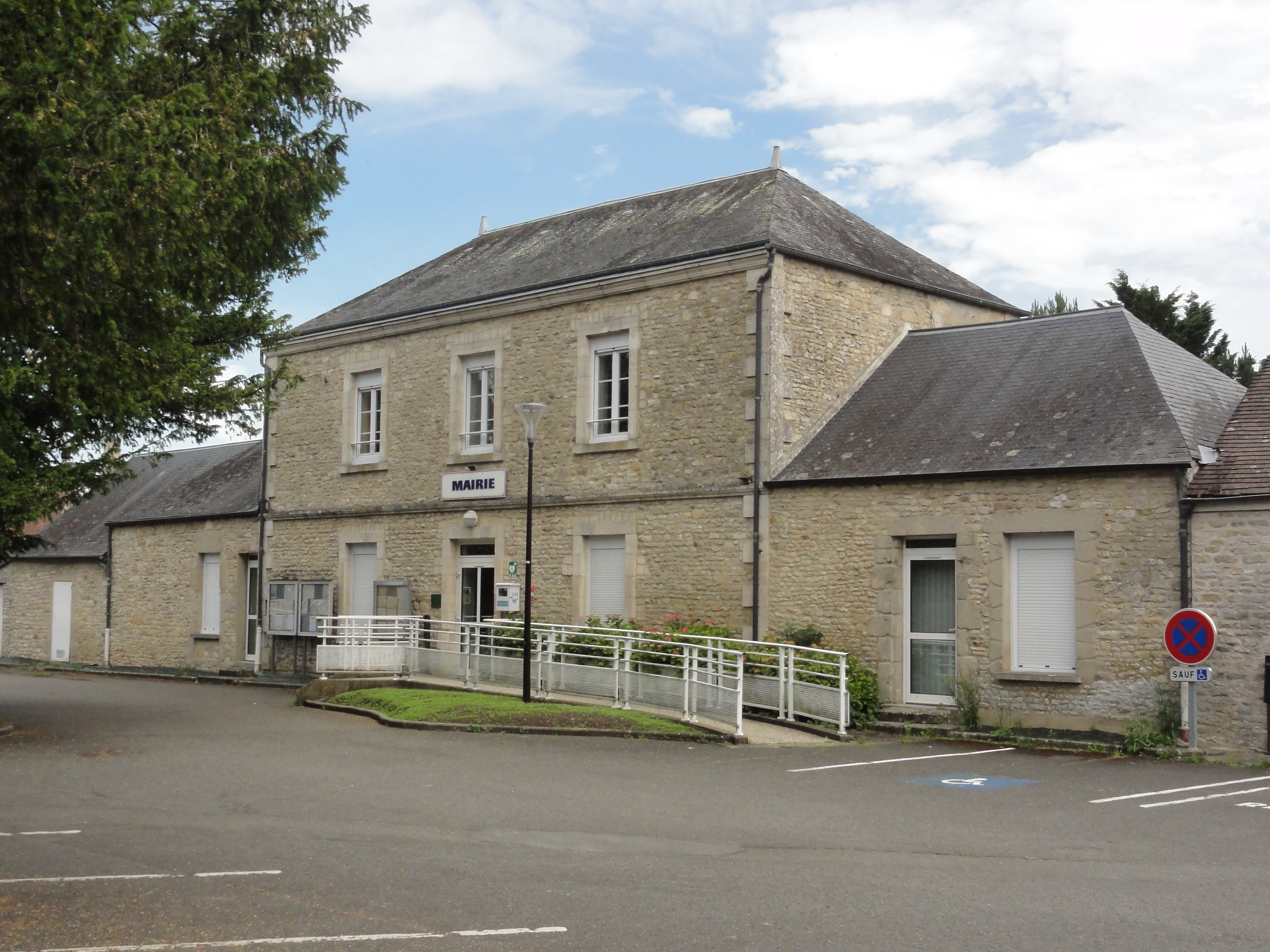
- Saint-Paterne Town hall

- Coat of arms
- Location of Saint-Paterne
- Location within France Location within Pays de la Loire
- Coordinates: 48°24′56″N 0°06′41″E
- Country: France
- Region: Pays de la Loire
- Department: Sarthe
- Arrondissement: Mamers
- Canton: Mamers
- Commune: Saint Paterne - Le Chevain
- Area^{1}: 7.23 km^{2} (2.79 sq mi)
- Elevation: 135 m (443 ft)
- Highest elevation: 148 m (486 ft)
- Lowest elevation: 130 m (430 ft)
- Population (2022): 1,527
  - Density: 211/km^{2} (547/sq mi)
- Demonym: Saint-Paternais
- Time zone: UTC+01:00 (CET)
  - Summer (DST): UTC+02:00 (CEST)
- Postal code: 72610
- ^{1} French Land Register data, which excludes lakes, ponds, glaciers > 1 km^{2} (0.386 sq mi or 247 acres) and river estuaries.

Saint-Paterne is a former commune in the Sarthe department in the region of Pays de la Loire in north-western France. On 1 January 2017, it was merged into the new commune Saint Paterne - Le Chevain.

== See also ==
- Communes of the Sarthe department
