= Château de Commequiers =

Castle in Pays de la Loire, France

Coordinates: 46.7663°N 1.8315°W

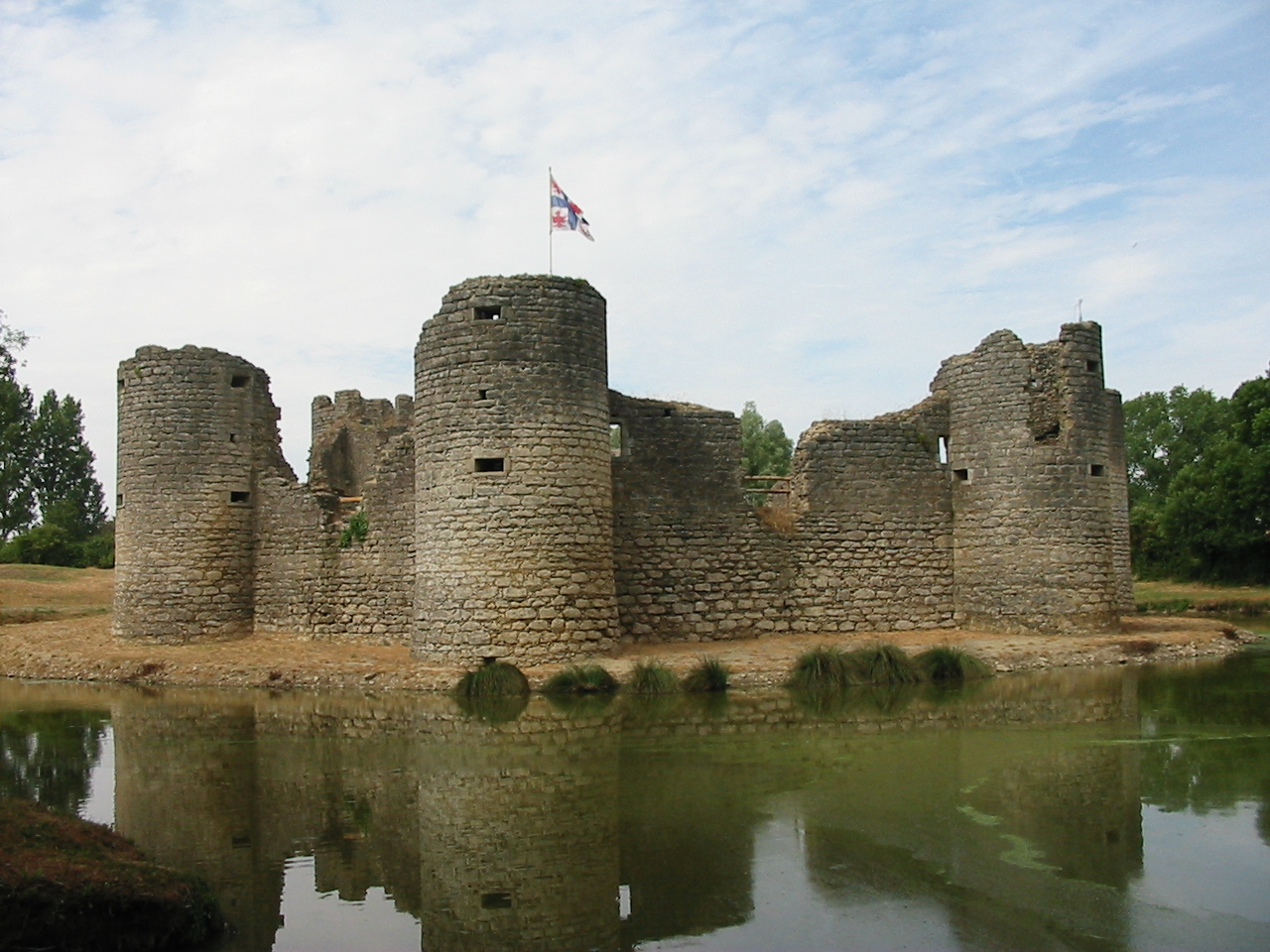
Château de Commequiers

The Château de Commequiers is a castle in Commequiers in Vendée, France. The original location and time of construction of the original castle is unknown. Some scholars claim it may have been built in the 11th century, at the same time as the châteaux of La Chaize-le-Vicomte and Tiffauges, under the commission of the Viscount of Thouars, who had influence over what are today the northern parts of Vendée.

The castle was constructed by Louis de Beaumont between the latter half of the 15th century and beginning of the 16th using white Sallertaine stone. In 1628, under orders from the cardinal de Richilieu, the castle was dismantled along with all other castles of its time in the region. It became property of historically Protestant nobles, the de la Trémoille family.

In 1926, the castle was registered as a historical monument. Each year, the organization “Friends of the old castle at Commequiers” organizes various events, including “Médievales”, a two-day festival including period costumes.

The earliest known lord of Commequiers (spelled Quemeiquiers at the time) is Urvoidus. In 1093, he participated in the foundation of the priory of Saint-Nicolas at Chaize-le-Vicomte by Aimery IV de Thouars. Urvoidus was almost certainly a vassal of the Thouars, and in 1099 was named Baron of Commequiers. His barony consisted of the parishes of Soullans, Saint-Christophe-du-Ligneron, Maché and le Perrier. Furthermore, five chatelaines were added including La Vérie, near Challans. Through an arranged marriage, the barony of Commequiers was added to the Lordship of Montaigue at the end of the 12th century. At the beginning of the 14th century, the new baron of Commequiers was the lord of Forêt-sur-Sèvres, Josselin.
