= Montsûrs =

- Commune
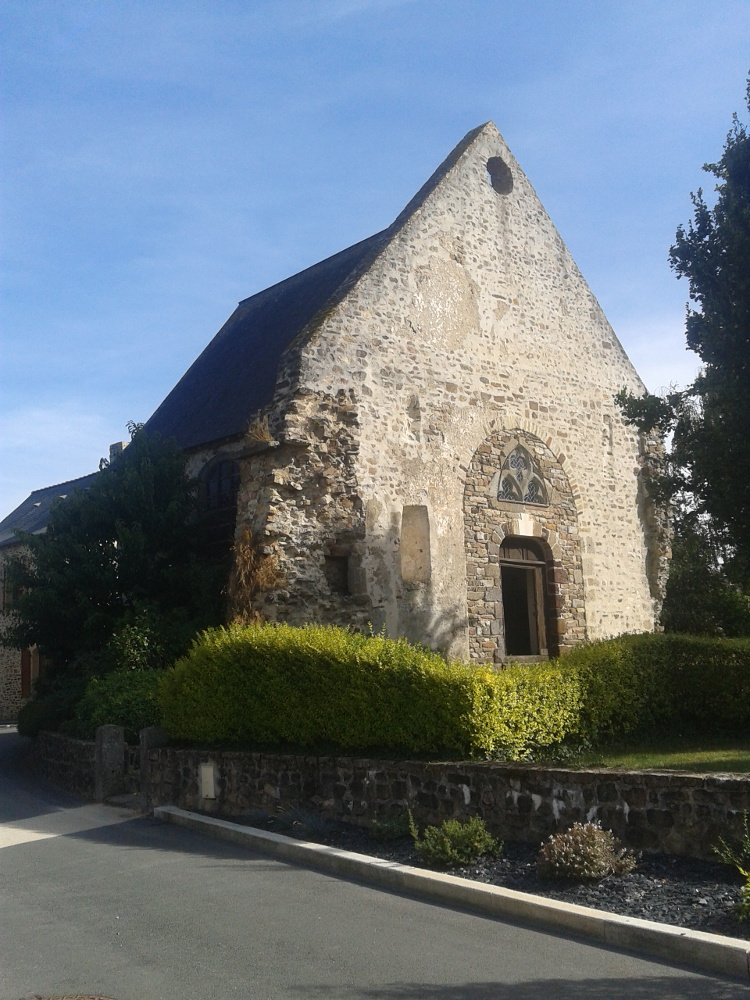
- The Chapel of Saint-Martin, in Montsûrs

- Coat of arms
- Location of Montsûrs
- Location within France Location within Pays de la Loire
- Coordinates: 48°08′05″N 0°33′09″W
- Country: France
- Region: Pays de la Loire
- Department: Mayenne
- Arrondissement: Mayenne
- Canton: Évron
- Area^{1}: 68.14 km^{2} (26.31 sq mi)
- Elevation: 89 m (292 ft)
- Highest elevation: 151 m (495 ft)
- Lowest elevation: 62 m (203 ft)
- Population (2023): 3,192
  - Density: 46.84/km^{2} (121.3/sq mi)
- Time zone: UTC+01:00 (CET)
  - Summer (DST): UTC+02:00 (CEST)
- INSEE/Postal code: 53161 /53150
- ^{1} French Land Register data, which excludes lakes, ponds, glaciers > 1 km^{2} (0.386 sq mi or 247 acres) and river estuaries.

Montsûrs (French pronunciation: [mɔ̃syʁ]) is a commune in the Mayenne department in north-western France. On 1 January 2017, it was merged with Saint-Céneré and formed the short-lived commune Montsûrs-Saint-Céneré. Montsûrs-Saint-Céneré was merged with Deux-Évailles, Montourtier and Saint-Ouën-des-Vallons on 1 January 2019, and the new commune took the name of Montsûrs. The river Jouanne flows through the commune.

== Population ==
Population data refer to the area corresponding with the commune as of January 2025.

Historical population
Year	Pop.	±% p.a.
1968	3,016	—
1975	3,131	+0.54%
1982	3,216	+0.38%
1990	3,126	−0.35%
1999	3,109	−0.06%
2007	3,241	+0.52%
2012	3,316	+0.46%
2017	3,227	−0.54%
2023	3,192	−0.18%
Source: INSEE

== Points of interest ==
- Arboretum de Montsûrs

== See also ==
- Communes of the Mayenne department
