= Saint-Denis-la-Chevasse =

- Commune
- Coat of arms
- Location of Saint-Denis-la-Chevasse
- Location within France Location within Pays de la Loire
- Coordinates: 46°49′23″N 1°21′25″W
- Country: France
- Region: Pays de la Loire
- Department: Vendée
- Arrondissement: La Roche-sur-Yon
- Canton: Aizenay
- Intercommunality: Vie et Boulogne

Government
  - Mayor (2020–2026): Mireille Hermouet
- Area^{1}: 39.47 km^{2} (15.24 sq mi)
- Highest elevation: 88 m (289 ft)
- Lowest elevation: 43 m (141 ft)
- Population (2023): 2,419
  - Density: 61.29/km^{2} (158.7/sq mi)
- Time zone: UTC+01:00 (CET)
  - Summer (DST): UTC+02:00 (CEST)
- INSEE/Postal code: 85208 /85170
- ^{1} French Land Register data, which excludes lakes, ponds, glaciers > 1 km^{2} (0.386 sq mi or 247 acres) and river estuaries.

Saint-Denis-la-Chevasse (French pronunciation: [sɛ̃ dəni la ʃəvas]) is a commune in the Vendée department in the Pays de la Loire region in western France.

== Population ==
Historical population
Year	Pop.	±% p.a.
1968	1,548	—
1975	1,471	−0.73%
1982	1,432	−0.38%
1990	1,543	+0.94%
1999	1,665	+0.85%
2007	1,979	+2.18%
2012	2,209	+2.22%
2017	2,290	+0.72%
2023	2,419	+0.92%
Source: INSEE

== See also ==
- Communes of the Vendée department
