= Vieux-château de l'Île d'Yeu =

Coordinates: 46°41′58″N 2°22′07″W

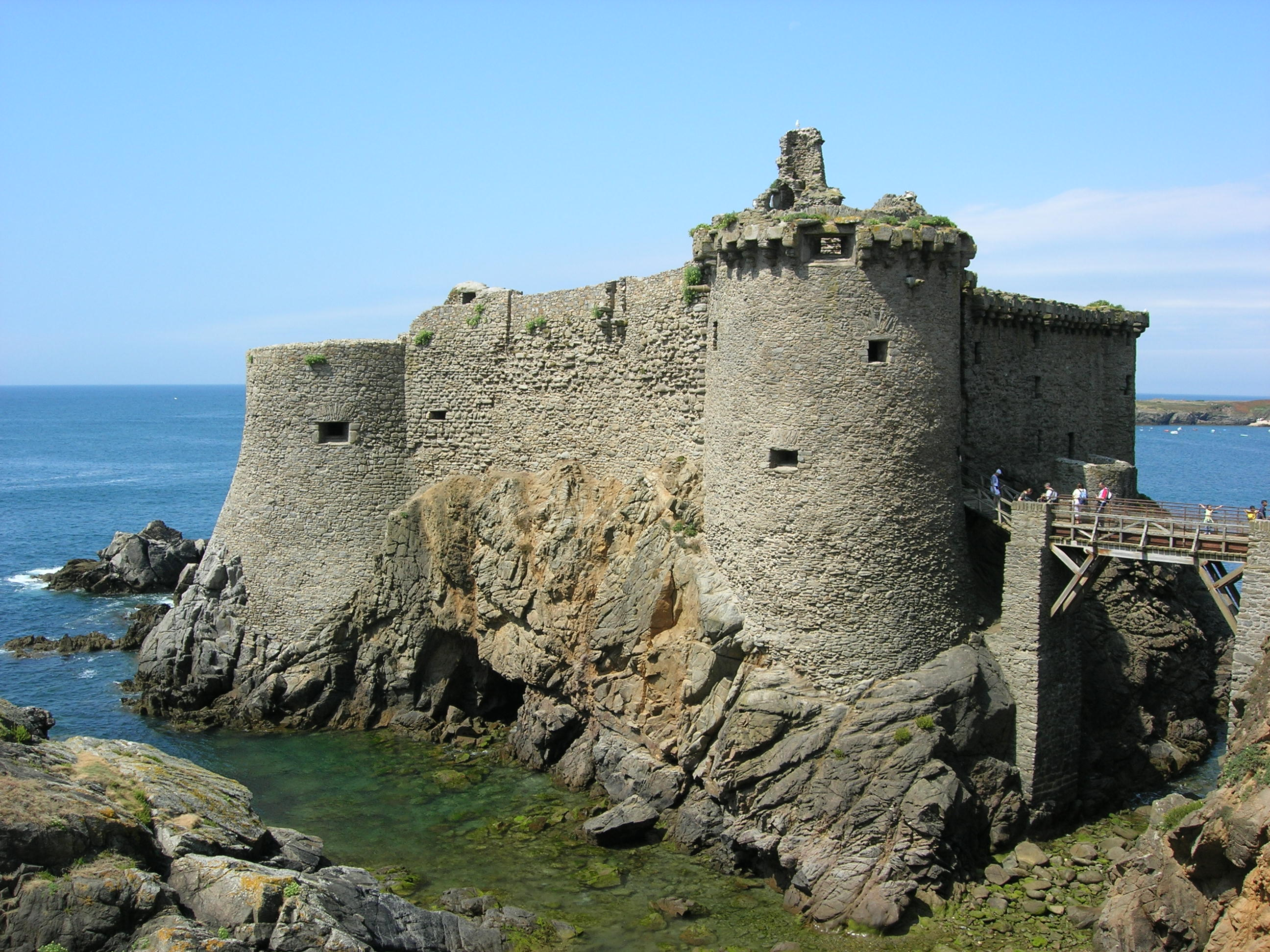
Île d'Yeu - Vieux château

The Vieux-château de l'Île d'Yeu ("Old castle of the Isle of Yeu") is a fortification on Île d'Yeu off the French Atlantic coast in the département of Vendée.

Olivier IV de Clisson, a great builder of castles, undertook the work with the aim of protecting the islanders in the event of foreign invasion. The longest of these had been led by the famous English pirate, Robert Knolles, who managed to seize the castle in 1355 and occupied the island for 37 years. In 1381, Île d'Yeu was retaken during the reconquest of Poitou by his son, Olivier V de Clisson.

During the Renaissance, Jean V de Rieux, master of the isle, erected towered walls around the castle. This type of construction was carried out by Italian engineers brought back from the Italian Wars by King Francis I. This protection proved effective in 1550 when several thousand Spanish soldiers attacked from the north. Held in check under the walls by the local garrison, they were forced to retreat by sea to the Iberian peninsula.

Later, Vauban perfected this style of military architecture for his famous forts. The Vieux-château, made obsolete by the construction between 1654 and 1660 of small coastal forts following Vauban's technique, was demolished at the end of the 17th century, along with several other ancient castles on the French coast, by order of Louis XIV, worried that they could be taken by an enemy and used as strong points.

The Vieux-château de l'Île d'Yeu has been classified as a monument historique (historic monument) since 1900.

Hergé, the Belgian cartoonist, was inspired by the Vieux-château in the design of The Adventures of Tintin comic, The Black Island.

== See also ==
- List of castles in France
- Jeanne de Clisson
- Olivier IV de Clisson
