= Montourtier =

- Part of Montsûrs
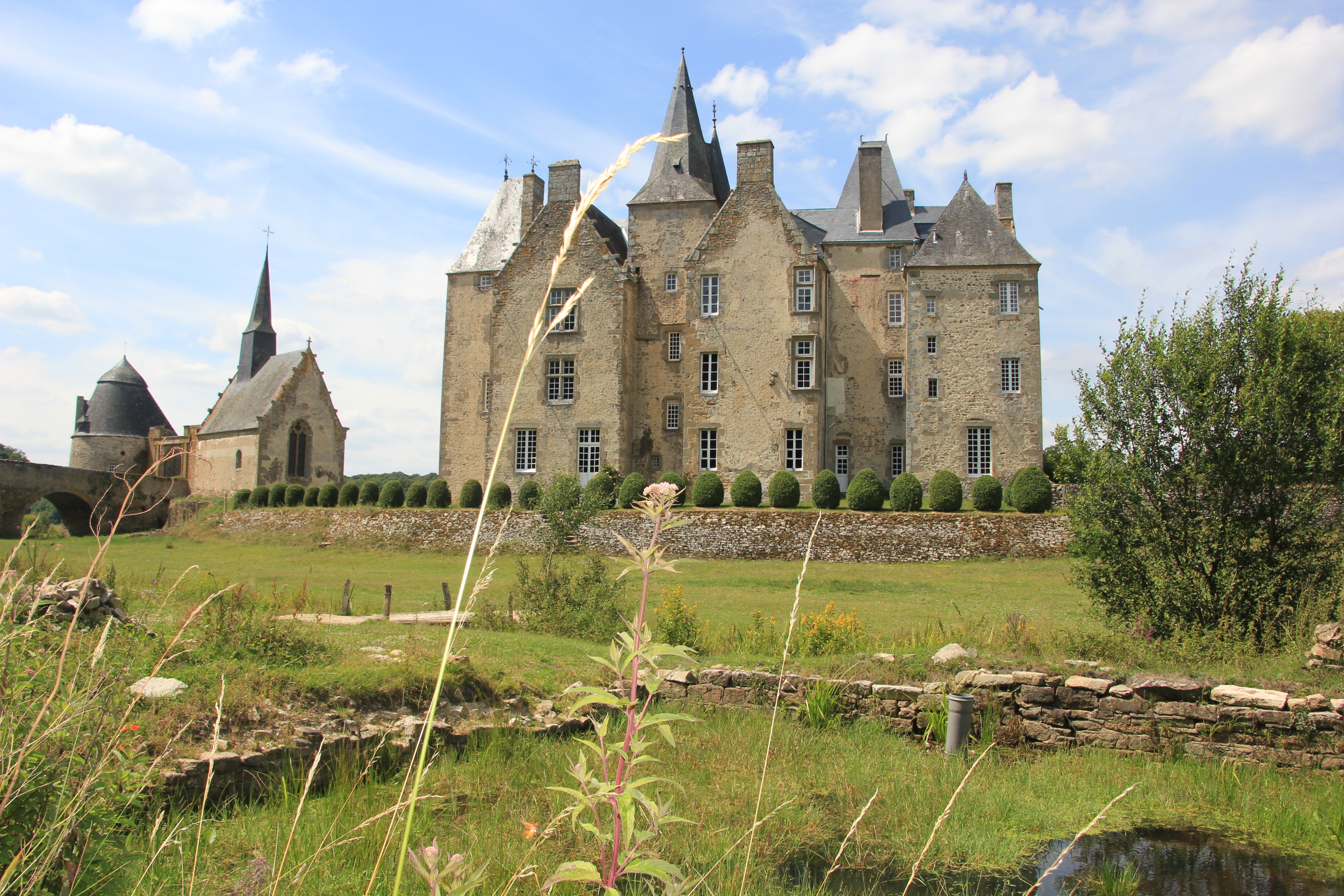
- The Château de Bourgon
- Location of Montourtier
- Location within France Location within Pays de la Loire
- Coordinates: 48°12′15″N 0°33′00″W
- Country: France
- Region: Pays de la Loire
- Department: Mayenne
- Arrondissement: Mayenne
- Canton: Évron
- Commune: Montsûrs
- Area^{1}: 19.09 km^{2} (7.37 sq mi)
- Elevation: 103 m (338 ft)
- Highest elevation: 151 m (495 ft)
- Lowest elevation: 97 m (318 ft)
- Population (2022): 331
  - Density: 17.3/km^{2} (44.9/sq mi)
- Time zone: UTC+01:00 (CET)
  - Summer (DST): UTC+02:00 (CEST)
- Postal code: 53150
- ^{1} French Land Register data, which excludes lakes, ponds, glaciers > 1 km^{2} (0.386 sq mi or 247 acres) and river estuaries.

Montourtier is a former commune in the Mayenne department in north-western France.

On 1 January 2019 the commune was unified with Montsûrs-Saint-Céneré, Deux-Évailles and Saint-Ouën-des-Vallons, and the new municipality took the name of Montsûrs.

== See also ==
- Communes of Mayenne
