= Saint-Ouën-des-Vallons =

- Part of Montsûrs
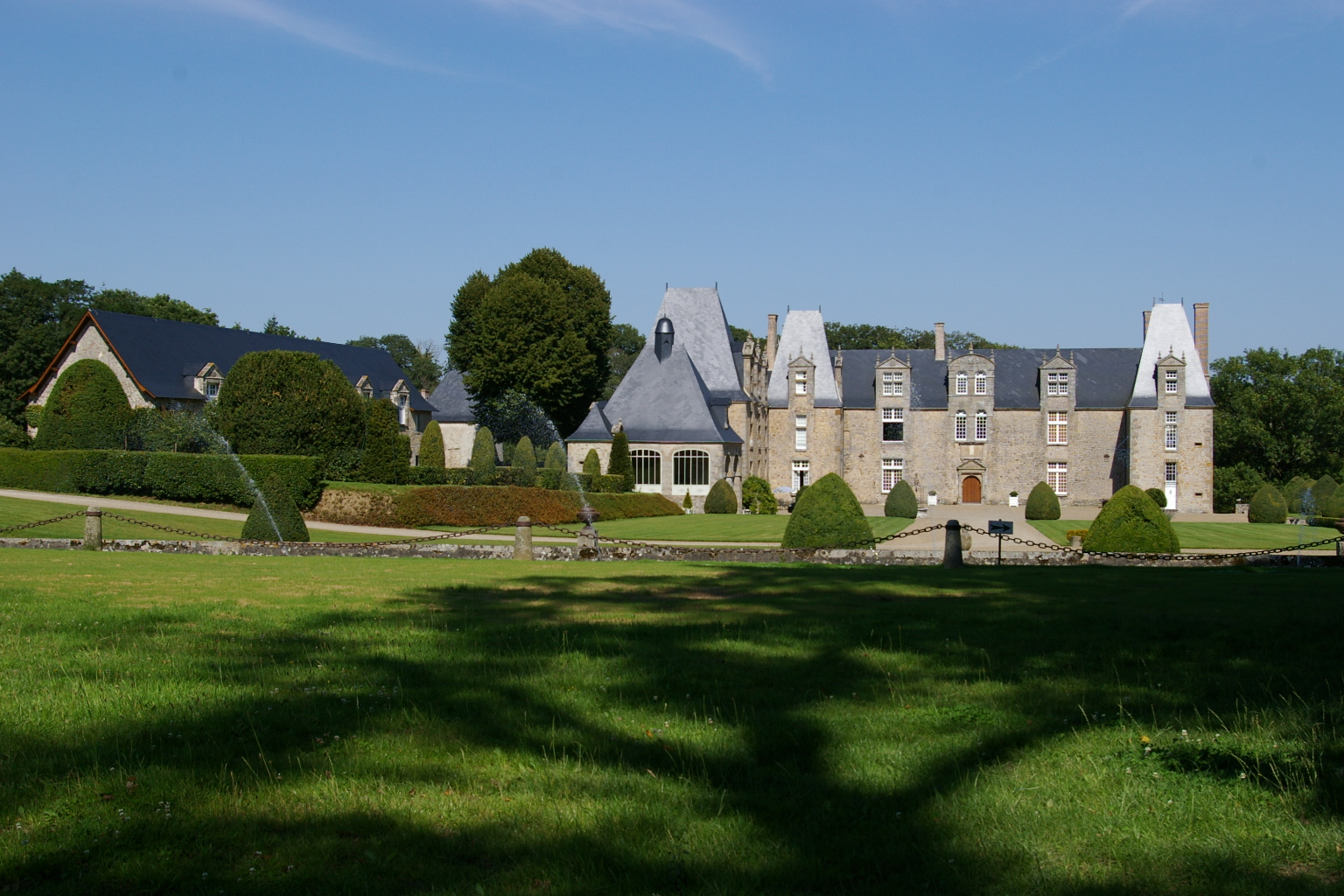
- The Château de la Roche-Pichemer, in Saint-Ouën-des-Vallons
- Location of Saint-Ouën-des-Vallons
- Location within France Location within Pays de la Loire
- Coordinates: 48°10′07″N 0°32′51″W
- Country: France
- Region: Pays de la Loire
- Department: Mayenne
- Arrondissement: Mayenne
- Canton: Évron
- Commune: Montsûrs
- Area^{1}: 7.38 km^{2} (2.85 sq mi)
- Elevation: 110 m (360 ft)
- Highest elevation: 128 m (420 ft)
- Lowest elevation: 82 m (269 ft)
- Population (2022): 197
  - Density: 26.7/km^{2} (69.1/sq mi)
- Time zone: UTC+01:00 (CET)
  - Summer (DST): UTC+02:00 (CEST)
- Postal code: 53150
- ^{1} French Land Register data, which excludes lakes, ponds, glaciers > 1 km^{2} (0.386 sq mi or 247 acres) and river estuaries.

Saint-Ouën-des-Vallons (French pronunciation: [sɛ̃.t‿wɛ̃ de valɔ̃]) is a former commune in the Mayenne department in north-western France.

From 1 January 2019 the commune was unified with Montsûrs-Saint-Céneré, Deux-Évailles and Montourtier, and the new municipality took the name of Montsûrs.

== See also ==
- Communes of the Mayenne department
