= Deux-Évailles =

- Part of Montsûrs
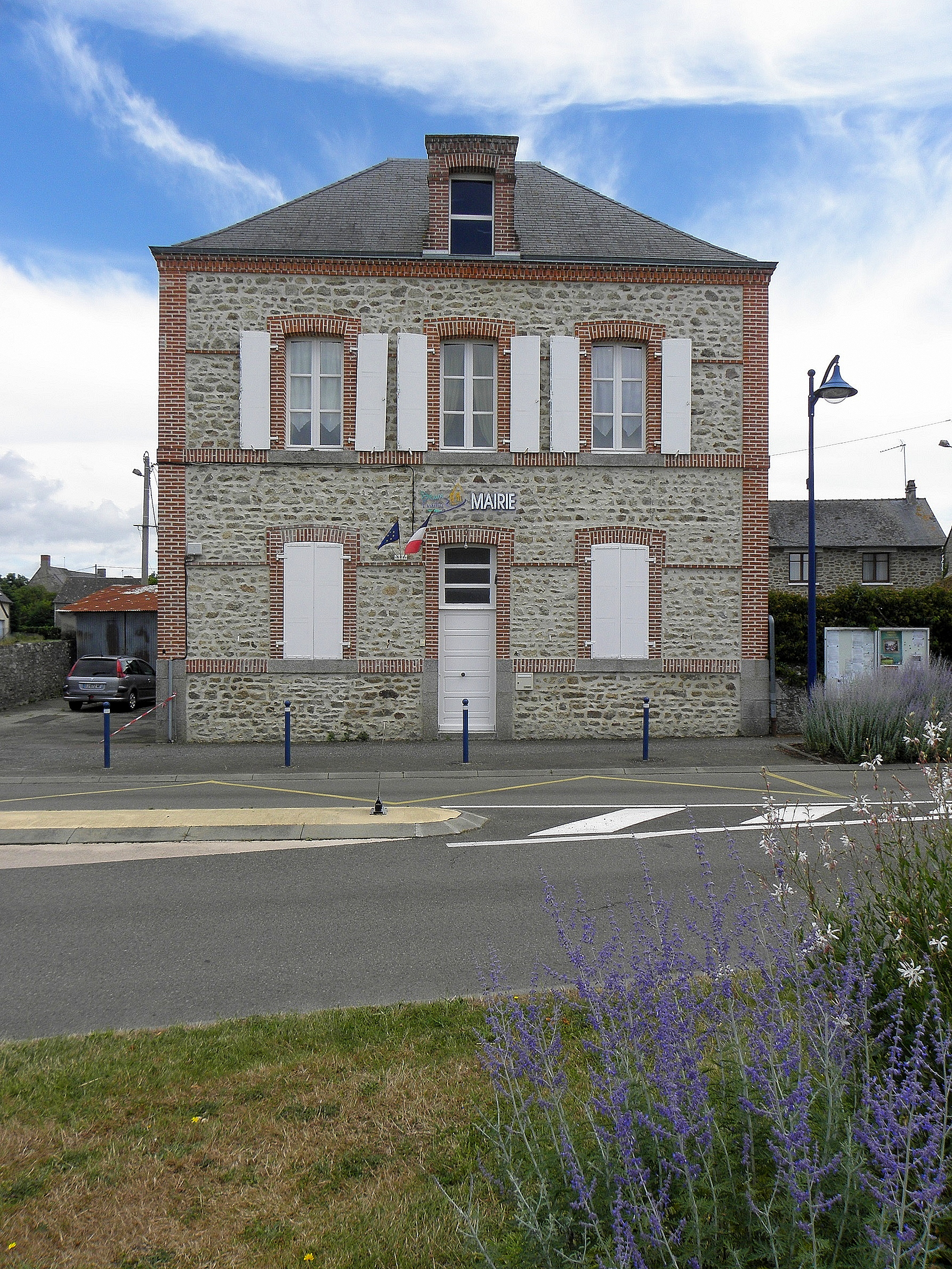
- Town hall
- Location of Deux-Évailles
- Location within France Location within Pays de la Loire
- Coordinates: 48°11′31″N 0°31′32″W
- Country: France
- Region: Pays de la Loire
- Department: Mayenne
- Arrondissement: Mayenne
- Canton: Évron
- Commune: Montsûrs
- Area^{1}: 11.93 km^{2} (4.61 sq mi)
- Elevation: 112 m (367 ft)
- Highest elevation: 130 m (430 ft)
- Lowest elevation: 92 m (302 ft)
- Population (2022): 208
  - Density: 17.4/km^{2} (45.2/sq mi)
- Time zone: UTC+01:00 (CET)
  - Summer (DST): UTC+02:00 (CEST)
- Postal code: 53150
- ^{1} French Land Register data, which excludes lakes, ponds, glaciers > 1 km^{2} (0.386 sq mi or 247 acres) and river estuaries.

Deux-Évailles (French pronunciation: [dø.z‿evaj]) is a former commune in the Mayenne department in north-western France. On 1 January 2019 the commune was unified with Montsûrs-Saint-Céneré, Montourtier and Saint-Ouën-des-Vallons, and the new municipality took the name of Montsûrs.

== See also ==
- Communes of the Mayenne department
