= Perrine Dugué =

French murder victim (c. 1779–1796)

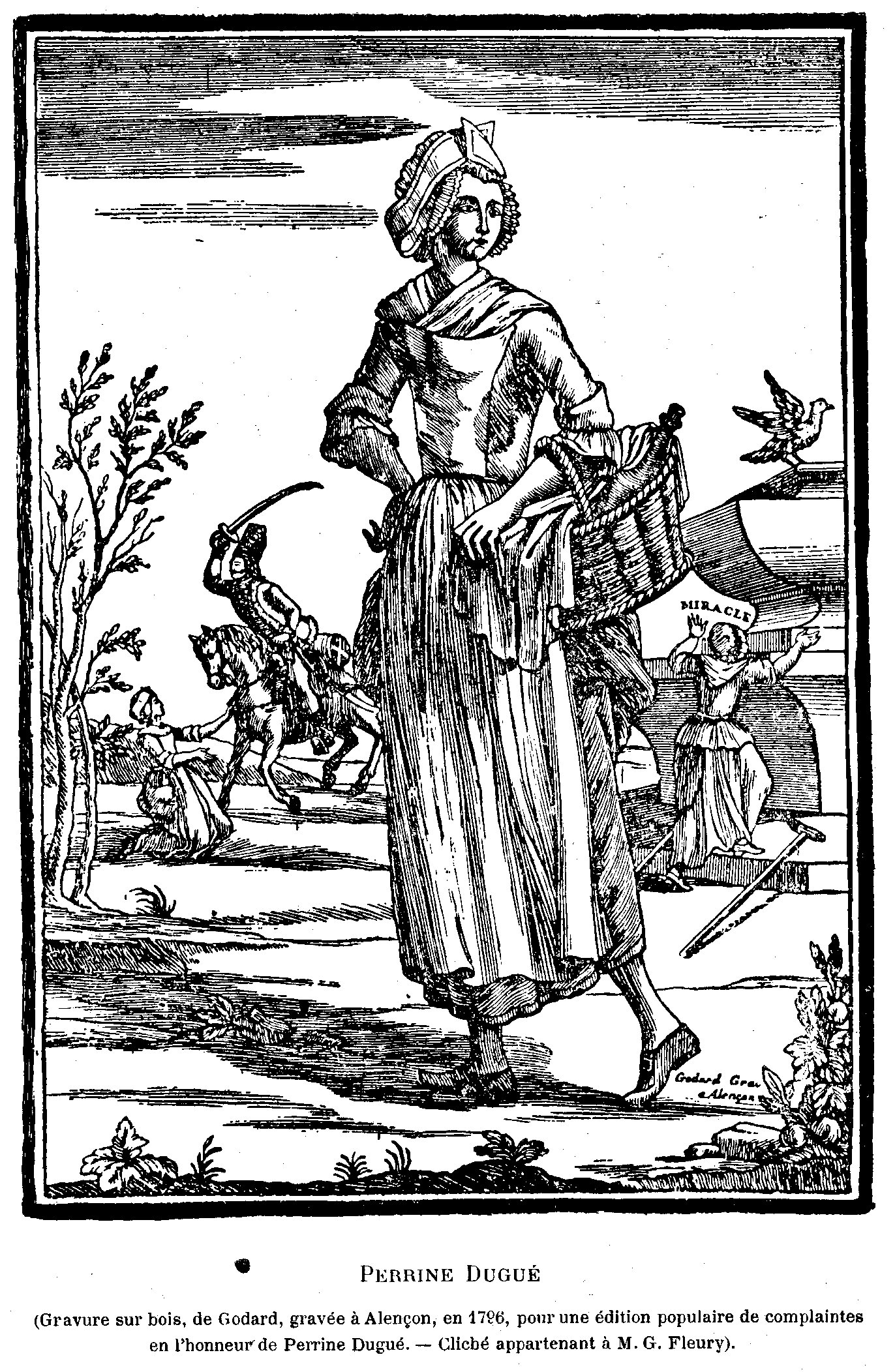
- Engraving of Perrine Dugué, 1796
- Born: c. 1779 (Note: Some sources say she was born in April 1777, specifically 10 April or 24 April, and died when she was 19. Other sources say she was born in 1779 and died when she was 17. The inscription that her family put on her tombstone says that she was 17 years-old when she died, which would mean she was born after 1777.); Épineux-le-Seguin, Kingdom of France
- Died: 22 March 1796 (aged 16–17); Saint-Jean-sur-Erve, First French Republic
- Known for: A murder victim and revolutionary martyr whose grave was rumored to have miraculous healing powers

Perrine Dugué (c. 1779 – 22 March 1796) was a French teenager who was murdered by counter-revolutionary Chouans while she was traveling to the fair in Sainte-Suzanne in 1796. She was targeted for allegedly bringing information to her brothers, who were conscripted into General François Joseph Westermann's republican army during the ongoing conflicts of the war in the Vendée during the French Revolution.

The local authorities had no power to seek justice for Dugué's murder, and she was buried in secret due to fears of reprisal from the Chouans. After her burial, her grave was rumored to have miraculous healing powers and became a pilgrimage site. Using donations from pilgrims, her family built a chapel for her remains. Though never officially recognized by the Catholic Church, Dugué was venerated as a revolutionary martyr and referred to as "the saint with tricolor wings."

== Early life ==
Perrine Dugué was born c. 1779 in either Thorigné or Épineux-le-Seguin in the Mayenne department of northwest France. Her family were farmers and staunch republicans and included her father Jean, her mother Marie Renard, one sister, and five brothers. Her community lived in extreme poverty due to rampant looting from armies on both sides of the war.

== Murder ==
During the war in the Vendée and the Virée de Galerne, Chouans joined counter-revolutionary royalist armies that were advancing toward Granville, plundering as they went. After their defeat by General François Joseph Westermann, the royalist troops retreated in disarray toward Maine. Peasants in the area, encouraged by the presence of Westermann's republican troops, defended their homes and livestock on 12 December 1793 and captured many of the fleeing royalists. Two of Dugué's brothers were involved in this effort; afterwards, the brothers took refuge in Sainte-Suzanne, fearing they might be targeted by Chouans. The brothers were then conscripted into Westermann's army and tasked with continuing to hunt Chouans roaming the area.

Dugué visited her brothers at the barracks frequently. To get there, she would pass near a forest called la Grande Charnie, which was controlled by a group of Chouans connected to Louis Courtillé, who was also known as "Saint-Paul". Her travels to and from the barracks drew their attention, and they claimed that she was transporting intelligence. They threatened to kill her if they caught her on the road leading to the barracks again.

On 22 March 1796 (2 Germinal, Year IV on the French Republican calendar), Dugué planned to attend the fair in Sainte-Suzanne, ignoring the protests of her mother and neighbors who were concerned for her safety. She declared, "Le diable lui-même ne me retiendrait pas!" (transl. "The devil himself would not hold me back!") and set out on horseback with several companions. Along the road just north of Saint-Jean-sur-Erve, the group was stopped by three Chouans, who compelled her companions to leave and then forced her to get down from her horse. The Chouans cut Dugué down with their sabers and left her to bleed to death at the foot of an oak tree. She was discovered the next day, barely alive, but later died due to the severity of her wounds. Her community did not bury her for several days out of fear of reprisal from the Chouans.

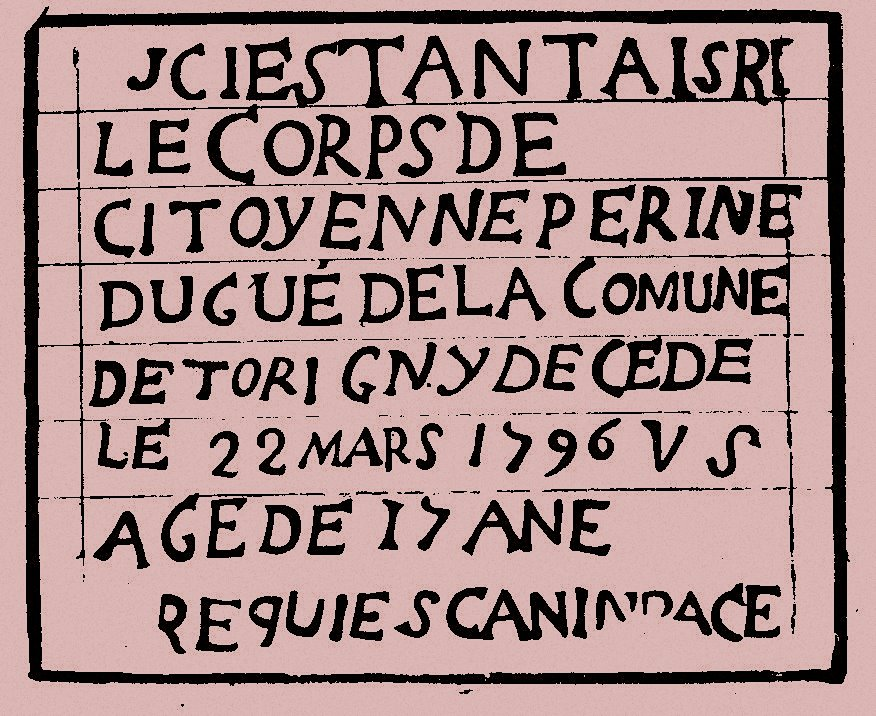
Dugué's epitaph which reads, in part: CITOYENNE PERINE DUGUÉ ... DECEDE LE 22 MARS 1796 ... AGE DE 17 ANE. (transl. "Citizen Perine Dugué ... died 22 March 1796 ... 17 years-old.")

Counter-revolutionaries claimed that she was killed by hussars—another name for light cavalry soldiers. Another narrative was that her murders were "bleus"—another name for revolutionary soldiers. However, the identities of her murderers were known to be Chouans, and two of them were from the nearby community of Saint-Jean-sur-Erve. A witness saw one of her murderers at a nearby farm, carrying a bloody saber. When questioned, the man with the saber admitted that he and the other Chouans killed Dugué, because they found "lettres dans ses souliers" (transl. letters in her shoes). Historians Michel Lagrée and Jehanne Roche describe the murder as "Vengeance politique" or "political vengeance": the murderers were taking revenge for their leader, Courtillé, who had been killed earlier that year. Ultimately, the local authorities had no power to enforce the law, and Dugué's murderers were never punished.

== Saint with tricolor wings ==
The chapel is located on farmland between Saint-Jean-sur-Erve and Sainte-Suzanne in the Mayenne department of France.

Oral traditions in her community say that her soul ascended to heaven with tricolor wings when she breathed her last breath. One of the women who buried Dugué claimed that she was miraculously healed, and the rumored healing powers of her grave quickly spread. An ephemeral "culte bizarre" (transl. bizarre cult) emerged around her for eighteen months after Dugué's death, and her grave became a popular pilgrimage site, with one thousand to fifteen hundred visitors flocking there at one point. People would lay down on the ground near her grave and rub themselves with dirt to be healed. Herbs that only grew on the "sépulture des bienheureux" (transl. tombs of the blessed) were rumored to grow around her grave.

In 1797, Dugué's family used donations from pilgrims to purchase a plot of land and build a chapel in her honor. The chapel measured 9.4 m (31 ft) by 5.1 m (17 ft) and approximately 7 m (23 ft) in height. They transferred her remains to the chapel at night to avoid being attacked by Chouans. During the ceremony, a hundred people held candles and watched silently.

Despite her popularity at the time, Dugué was never officially recognized as a saint by the Catholic Church. Still, she was venerated as a popular "saint" and revolutionary martyr. A portrait engraving was made of her, though it presented an incorrect version of events by depicting her murderer as a hussar on horseback. (Note: Also drawn wearing a tall cylindrical military headdress that is typical of hussar light cavalry units.) Three contemporary ballads, likely written by a local priest, were printed in her honor. The ballads did not mention her "well-known" revolutionary politics and, instead, "portray[ed] her simply as a good Christian girl who preferred death to being raped." Dugué's story follows the tradition of the "cult of 'patriotic saints'", where old patterns of Catholic worship were blended with the new political reality of the French Revolution.

== See also ==
- Chouannerie
- Tombe à la fille – "Sainte Pataude", a teenager murdered by Chouans in 1795
- Françoise Gandriau – "Petite-Émigrée", a teenager who was guillotined in 1794
