= Thorigné-en-Charnie =

- Commune
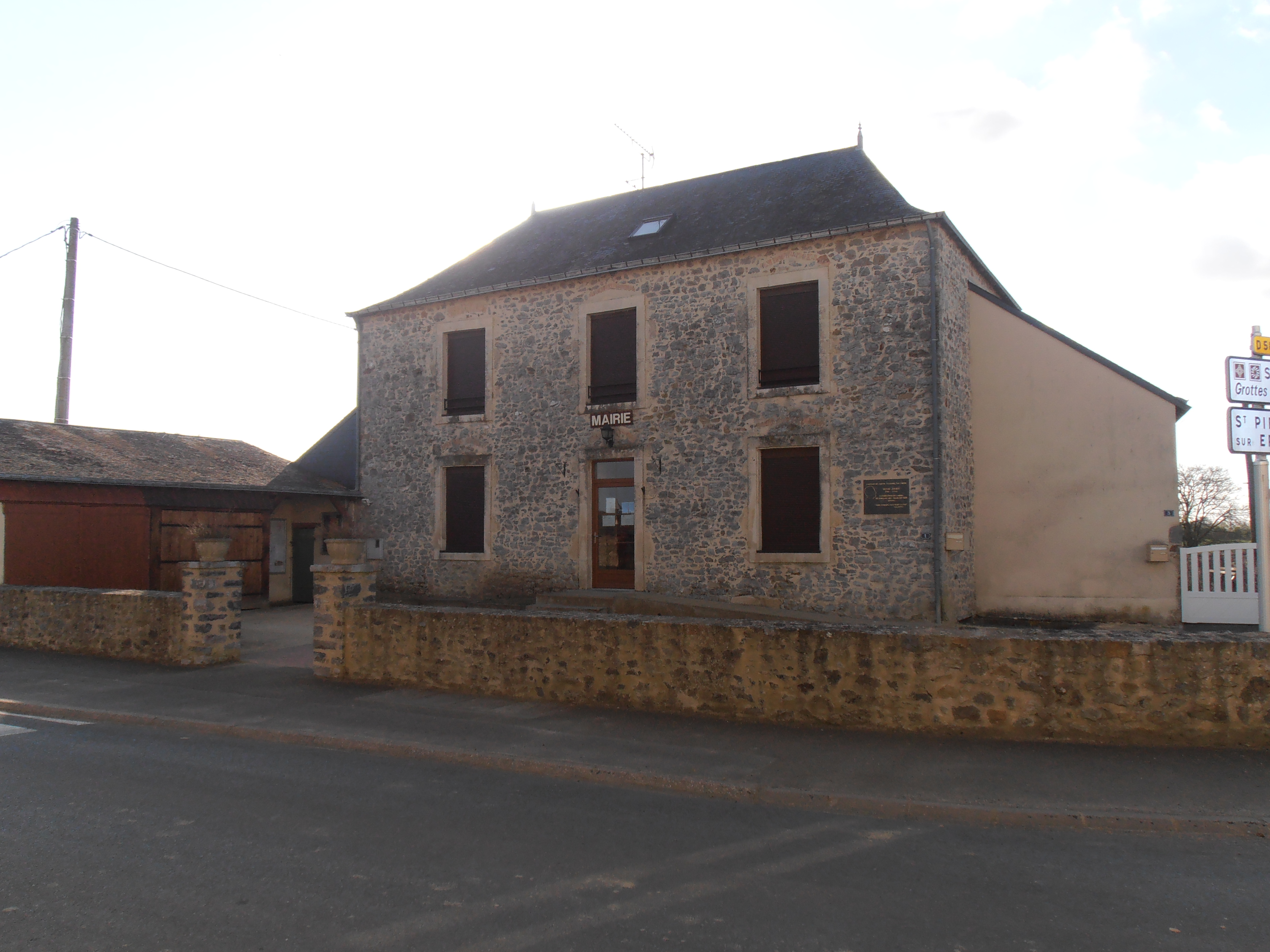
- The town hall of Thorigné-en-Charnie

- Coat of arms
- Location of Thorigné-en-Charnie
- Location within France Location within Pays de la Loire
- Coordinates: 48°00′05″N 0°21′25″W
- Country: France
- Region: Pays de la Loire
- Department: Mayenne
- Arrondissement: Mayenne
- Canton: Meslay-du-Maine

Government
  - Mayor (2020–2026): Bernard Morice
- Area^{1}: 17.57 km^{2} (6.78 sq mi)
- Elevation: 102 m (335 ft)
- Highest elevation: 114 m (374 ft)
- Lowest elevation: 57 m (187 ft)
- Population (2023): 191
  - Density: 10.9/km^{2} (28.2/sq mi)
- Time zone: UTC+01:00 (CET)
  - Summer (DST): UTC+02:00 (CEST)
- INSEE/Postal code: 53264 /53270
- ^{1} French Land Register data, which excludes lakes, ponds, glaciers > 1 km^{2} (0.386 sq mi or 247 acres) and river estuaries.

Thorigné-en-Charnie (French pronunciation: [tɔʁiɲe ɑ̃ ʃaʁni], before 1953: Thorigné) is a commune in the Mayenne department in north-western France.

== History ==
On 22 March 1796, a teenager named Perrine Dugué was murdered by three Chouans in a field between Thorigné and Sainte-Suzanne. Her grave was rumored to have miraculous healing powers, and it quickly became a popular pilgrimage site. Though never officially recognized by the church, she was venerated as a patriotic martyr and referred to as "the saint with tricolor wings."

== See also ==
- Communes of the Mayenne department
