= Beaumont-Pied-de-Bœuf =

Beaumont-Pied-de-Bœuf may refer to the following places in France:

- Beaumont-Pied-de-Bœuf, Mayenne, a commune in the Mayenne department
- Beaumont-Pied-de-Bœuf, Sarthe, a commune in the Sarthe department
