= Ballée =

- Part of Val-du-Maine
- Location of Ballée
- Location within France Location within Pays de la Loire
- Coordinates: 47°56′00″N 0°24′54″W
- Country: France
- Region: Pays de la Loire
- Department: Mayenne
- Arrondissement: Château-Gontier
- Canton: Meslay-du-Maine
- Commune: Val-du-Maine
- Area^{1}: 14.19 km^{2} (5.48 sq mi)
- Highest elevation: 88 m (289 ft)
- Lowest elevation: 37 m (121 ft)
- Population (2023): 702
  - Density: 49.5/km^{2} (128/sq mi)
- Time zone: UTC+01:00 (CET)
  - Summer (DST): UTC+02:00 (CEST)
- Postal code: 53340
- ^{1} French Land Register data, which excludes lakes, ponds, glaciers > 1 km^{2} (0.386 sq mi or 247 acres) and river estuaries.

Ballée (French pronunciation: [bale]) is a former commune in the Mayenne department in northwestern France. On 1 January 2017, it was merged into the new commune Val-du-Maine.

== Geography ==
The Vaige forms part of the commune's western border.

== See also ==
- Communes of Mayenne
