= Chammes =

Commune in Mayenne, France

- Part of Sainte-Suzanne-et-Chammes
- Location of Chammes
- Location within France Location within Pays de la Loire
- Coordinates: 48°04′39″N 0°22′36″W
- Country: France
- Region: Pays de la Loire
- Department: Mayenne
- Arrondissement: Mayenne
- Canton: Meslay-du-Maine
- Commune: Sainte-Suzanne-et-Chammes
- Area^{1}: 21.06 km^{2} (8.13 sq mi)
- Elevation: 80 m (260 ft)
- Highest elevation: 132 m (433 ft)
- Lowest elevation: 73 m (240 ft)
- Population (2022): 360
  - Density: 17/km^{2} (44/sq mi)
- Time zone: UTC+01:00 (CET)
  - Summer (DST): UTC+02:00 (CEST)
- Postal code: 53270
- ^{1} French Land Register data, which excludes lakes, ponds, glaciers > 1 km^{2} (0.386 sq mi or 247 acres) and river estuaries.

Chammes (French pronunciation: [ʃam]) is a former commune in the Mayenne department in north-western France. On 1 January 2016, it was merged into the new commune of Sainte-Suzanne-et-Chammes.

== See also ==
- Communes of Mayenne
