= Hubert de Beaumont-au-Maine =

French viscount of Beaumont and Maine

The Beaumont family coat of arms, adopted at the start of the age of heraldry, c.1200

Hubert II de Beaumont-au-Maine, also known as Hubert de Sainte-Suzanne, was a French viscount of Beaumont and Maine, and later of Vendôme. In the 11th century he held the French territories of Beaumont, Fresnay and Sainte-Suzanne.

== Career ==
Hubert, was the son of Raoul V de Beaumont and Emma de Montreveau. He held several viscounties, including that of Sainte-Suzanne, Lude, Maine, Manceaux and Mans. During the lifetime of his father's second wife, Cana, he claimed to be her son, and always referred to her as "Viscountess".

Moved by the cause of the Count of Anjou and Maine, he played a significant role in the battle between his liege lords and William the Conqueror. Despite a four-year siege (1083–1086), the city of Sainte-Suzanne, defended by Hubert II, was the only castle that William the Conqueror never succeeded in taking.

== Genealogy ==
The Beaumont family, later Beaumont-Brienne, dominated this part of Maine from the tenth to the thirteenth centuries.

== Family ==
Hubert married Ermengarde de Nevers on 6 December 1067. She was the daughter of William I of Nevers (1029–1083), count of Nevers, and Ermengarde de Tonnerre. She appears with her husband in several historical accounts, notably at the confirmation of the chapel of Saint-Aubin du Lude, around 1090, and at the donation of Saint-Flaceau to the abbey of Saint-Vincent.

With her daughter Godeheult, the future abbess of the abbey at Étival, located in Chemiré-en-Charnie, Ermengarde frequently visited various convents. One Easter, having gone to Cellières, she gave the priest, Henri de Champeaux, the right to hunt in her forest; later on, at Christmas, she also gave the priest at Cheffes, Geoffroy de Nantes, permission to use her woods. An account exists, dated 28 December 1135, of a Viscountess Ermengarde, wife of Gautier Hait, Viscount of Mollan; Dom Guilloreau suggests this to be the very same Viscountess of Maine, remarried late in life, and still living despite being at least 90 years old. This account seems somewhat unbelievable and requires further proof to support it.

Hubert and Ermendgarde had:

1. Raoul († 1120–25), Viscount de Fresnay, de Beaumont, de Sainte-Suzanne
2. Hubert, mentioned in 1095
3. William
4. Denis
5. Godeheult († 1099), a nun at Cluny

== Sources ==
- Bouchard, Constance Brittain (1987). Sword, Miter, and Cloister:Nobility and the Church in Burgundy, 980-1198. Cornell University Press.
- Véron, Teddy (2007). L'intégration des Mauges à l'Anjou au XIe siècle (in French). Presses universitaires de Limoges.97
