= Maisoncelles-du-Maine =

- Commune
- Coat of arms
- Location of Maisoncelles-du-Maine
- Location within France Location within Pays de la Loire
- Coordinates: 47°57′56″N 0°39′00″W
- Country: France
- Region: Pays de la Loire
- Department: Mayenne
- Arrondissement: Château-Gontier
- Canton: Meslay-du-Maine

Government
  - Mayor (2020–2026): Michel Bourgeais
- Area^{1}: 15.83 km^{2} (6.11 sq mi)
- Elevation: 90 m (300 ft)
- Highest elevation: 112 m (367 ft)
- Lowest elevation: 38 m (125 ft)
- Population (2023): 506
  - Density: 32.0/km^{2} (82.8/sq mi)
- Time zone: UTC+01:00 (CET)
  - Summer (DST): UTC+02:00 (CEST)
- INSEE/Postal code: 53143 /53170
- ^{1} French Land Register data, which excludes lakes, ponds, glaciers > 1 km^{2} (0.386 sq mi or 247 acres) and river estuaries.

Maisoncelles-du-Maine (French pronunciation: [mɛzɔ̃sɛl dy mɛn], literally Maisoncelles of the Maine) is a commune in the Mayenne department in north-western France.

== See also ==
- Communes of Mayenne
