= Torcé-Viviers-en-Charnie =

- Commune
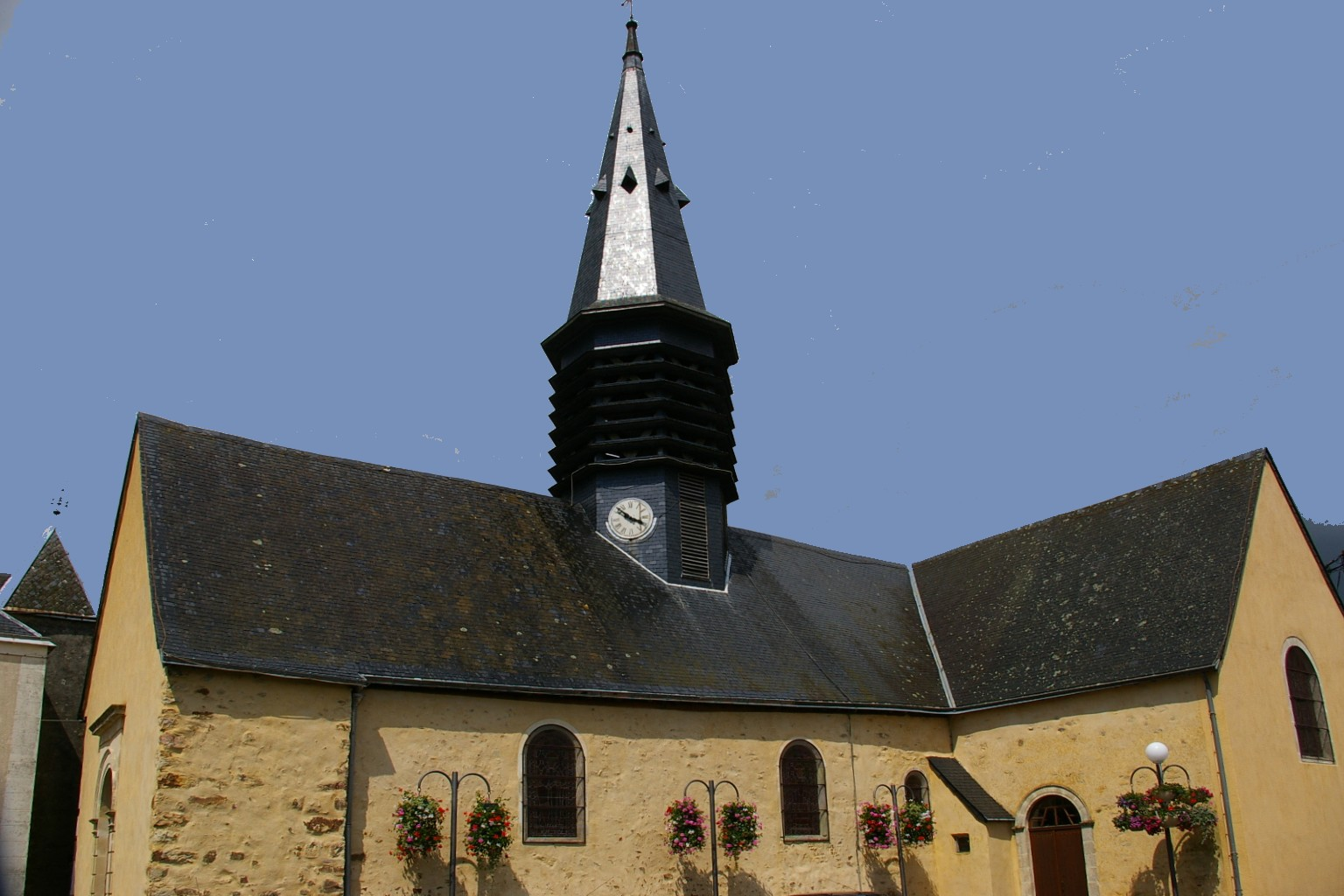
- The church in Torcé-Viviers-en-Charnie

- Coat of arms
- Location of Torcé-Viviers-en-Charnie
- Location within France Location within Pays de la Loire
- Coordinates: 48°05′59″N 0°15′38″W
- Country: France
- Region: Pays de la Loire
- Department: Mayenne
- Arrondissement: Mayenne
- Canton: Meslay-du-Maine

Government
  - Mayor (2020–2026): Joëlle Blanchard
- Area^{1}: 48.77 km^{2} (18.83 sq mi)
- Elevation: 200 m (660 ft)
- Highest elevation: 286 m (938 ft)
- Lowest elevation: 114 m (374 ft)
- Population (2023): 768
  - Density: 15.7/km^{2} (40.8/sq mi)
- Time zone: UTC+01:00 (CET)
  - Summer (DST): UTC+02:00 (CEST)
- INSEE/Postal code: 53265 /53270
- ^{1} French Land Register data, which excludes lakes, ponds, glaciers > 1 km^{2} (0.386 sq mi or 247 acres) and river estuaries.

Torcé-Viviers-en-Charnie (French pronunciation: [tɔʁse vivje ɑ̃ ʃaʁni]) is a commune in the Mayenne department in north-western France.

== See also ==
- Communes of the Mayenne department
