= Meslay-du-Maine =

- Commune
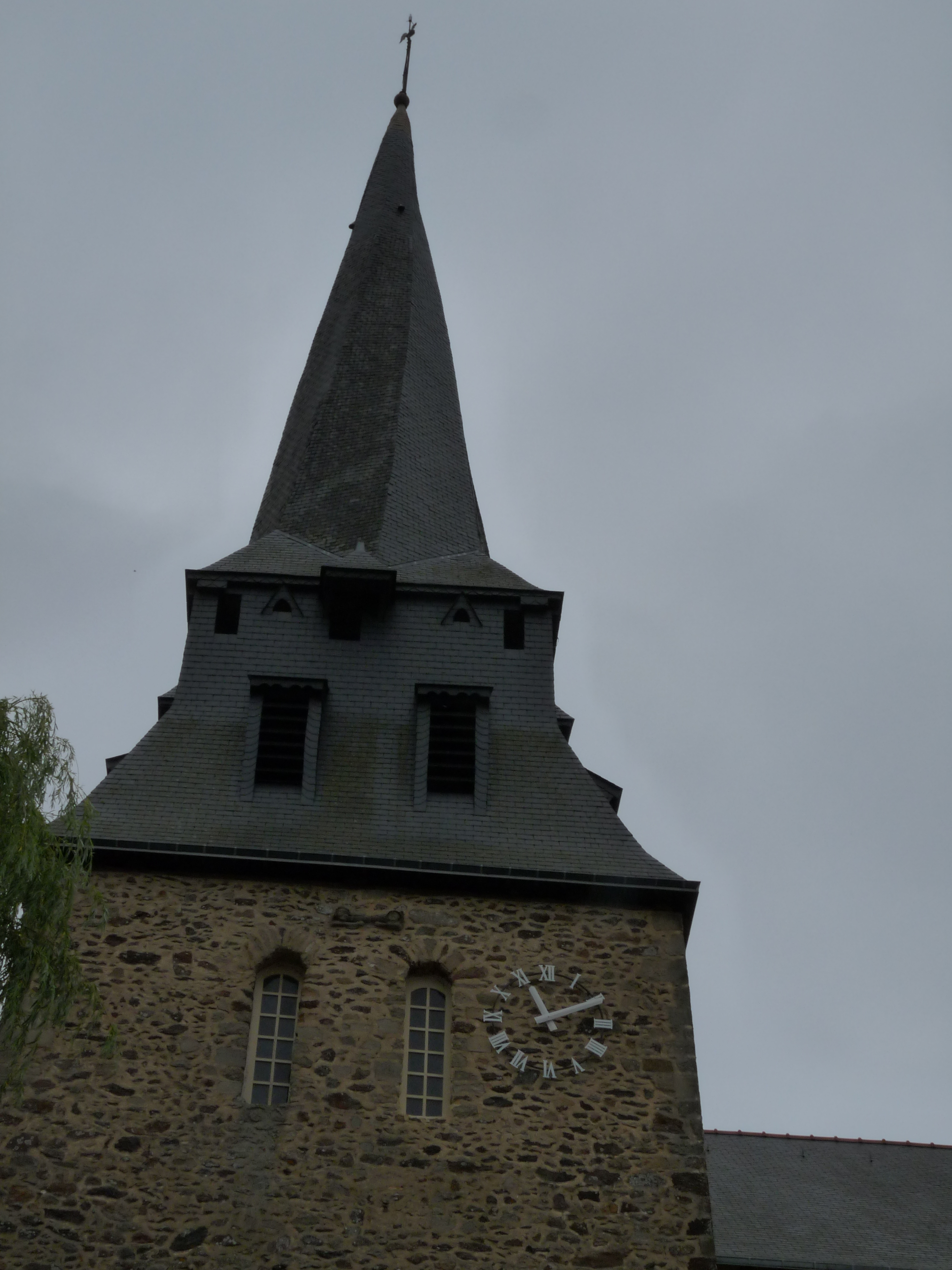
- The clock tower of the church, in Meslay-du-Maine

- Coat of arms
- Location of Meslay-du-Maine
- Location within France Location within Pays de la Loire
- Coordinates: 47°57′07″N 0°33′16″W
- Country: France
- Region: Pays de la Loire
- Department: Mayenne
- Arrondissement: Château-Gontier
- Canton: Meslay-du-Maine

Government
  - Mayor (2020–2026): Christian Boulay
- Area^{1}: 24.18 km^{2} (9.34 sq mi)
- Elevation: 90 m (300 ft)
- Highest elevation: 112 m (367 ft)
- Lowest elevation: 63 m (207 ft)
- Population (2023): 2,779
  - Density: 114.9/km^{2} (297.7/sq mi)
- Time zone: UTC+01:00 (CET)
  - Summer (DST): UTC+02:00 (CEST)
- INSEE/Postal code: 53152 /53170
- ^{1} French Land Register data, which excludes lakes, ponds, glaciers > 1 km^{2} (0.386 sq mi or 247 acres) and river estuaries.

Meslay-du-Maine (French pronunciation: [mɛlɛ dy mɛn]) is a commune in the Mayenne department in north-western France.

== Population ==
Historical population
Year	Pop.	±% p.a.
1968	1,676	—
1975	1,981	+2.42%
1982	2,201	+1.52%
1990	2,418	+1.18%
1999	2,612	+0.86%
2007	2,671	+0.28%
2012	2,777	+0.78%
2017	2,875	+0.70%
2023	2,779	−0.56%
Source: INSEE

== See also ==
- Communes of Mayenne
