= Le Bignon-du-Maine =

- Commune
- Coat of arms
- Location of Le Bignon-du-Maine
- Location within France Location within Pays de la Loire
- Coordinates: 47°57′05″N 0°36′32″W
- Country: France
- Region: Pays de la Loire
- Department: Mayenne
- Arrondissement: Château-Gontier
- Canton: Meslay-du-Maine

Government
  - Mayor (2020–2026): Jean-Louis Bellay
- Area^{1}: 14.29 km^{2} (5.52 sq mi)
- Elevation: 80 m (260 ft)
- Highest elevation: 114 m (374 ft)
- Lowest elevation: 68 m (223 ft)
- Population (2023): 322
  - Density: 22.5/km^{2} (58.4/sq mi)
- Time zone: UTC+01:00 (CET)
  - Summer (DST): UTC+02:00 (CEST)
- INSEE/Postal code: 53030 /53170
- ^{1} French Land Register data, which excludes lakes, ponds, glaciers > 1 km^{2} (0.386 sq mi or 247 acres) and river estuaries.

Le Bignon-du-Maine (French pronunciation: [lə biɲɔ̃ dy mɛn], literally Le Bignon of the Maine) is a commune in the Mayenne department in northwestern France.

== Population ==
Historical population
Year	Pop.	±% p.a.
1968	366	—
1975	289	−3.32%
1982	251	−1.99%
1990	288	+1.73%
1999	304	+0.60%
2007	362	+2.21%
2012	337	−1.42%
2017	336	−0.06%
2023	322	−0.71%
Source: INSEE

== See also ==
- Communes of Mayenne
