= Jean Déré =

French music educator and composer

- Born: June 23, 1886; Niort, France
- Died: December 6, 1970 (aged 84); Sainte-Suzanne, Mayenne, France
- Education: Conservatoire de Paris
- Occupations: composer, music educator

Jean Déré (23 June 1886 – 6 December 1970) was a French music educator and composer.

== Life ==
Born in Niort, Déré was introduced to classical music by his father, who was organist and choir director in Niort, and performed in public at the age of six. From 1897 he studied at the Conservatoire de Paris, where he was a student of Louis Diémer, Albert Lavignac, Georges Caussade, Charles Lenepveu, Jules Massenet and Charles Marie Widor.

Already in the time of the First World War he developed his first compositions, among them a symphonic poem and an opera. During this time he also taught in Niort and temporarily represented Widor as organist at The Great Organ of Église Saint-Sulpice de Paris, where he also met Albert Schweitzer several times.

As the competition and the Prix de Rome were suspended during the war, Déré had already clearly exceeded the maximum age of thirty years laid down in the rules when he participated in 1919. He won the "Second Grand Prix" with the cantata Le Poéte et la Fée.

He then taught counterpoint at the Conservatoire de Paris before becoming professor of solfège and harmony from 1937 to 1956. In 1933 he became one of the pioneers in the broadcasting of great classical concerts with Désiré-Émile Inghelbrecht, Élisabeth Brasseur and Igor Stravinsky. He was Jacques Loussier's teacher.

He is the author of pieces for piano, violin, orchestra and an opera Le Mirage. He is also author of film music, in particular Kœnigsmark (1923).

He remained active as a composer and wrote numerous church music works in addition to orchestral and choral works and chamber music.

Déré died in Sainte-Suzanne, Mayenne at age 84.

== Works ==
- Sonate for piano and violin
- Trio for piano, violin and cello
- Poème de la mer, symphonic poem in three parts
- Au seuil des arènes, Opera in three acts
- Esquisses sketches, ten pieces for orchestra
- Krishna, symphonic poem
- Trois Esquisses for piano and orchestra
- Stage music for Faustus by Christopher Marlowe
- Andante et Scherzo for clarinet and piano
- Suite brève et disparate for cello and piano
- Chant héroïque for cello and piano
- Deux sonates and Trois sonatines for violin and piano
- Trois sonatines for piano
- A la campagne for piano
- Trois marines for piano
- Trois danses anciennes for piano
- Chants arabes after Franz Toussaint
- Les Saintes du Paradis, song cycle after Rémy de Gourmont
- Jeux et chansons à la mode de chez nous
- Cinq Repons pour les funérailles : Libera me, Domine, Subvenite, In paradisum, Credo quod Redemptor and Qui Lazarum.
