= Saint-Loup-du-Dorat =

- Commune
- Location of Saint-Loup-du-Dorat
- Location within France Location within Pays de la Loire
- Coordinates: 47°53′29″N 0°24′57″W
- Country: France
- Region: Pays de la Loire
- Department: Mayenne
- Arrondissement: Château-Gontier
- Canton: Meslay-du-Maine
- Intercommunality: CC Pays de Meslay-Grez

Government
  - Mayor (2020–2026): Jean-Claude Bréhin
- Area^{1}: 8.29 km^{2} (3.20 sq mi)
- Elevation: 53 m (174 ft)
- Highest elevation: 72 m (236 ft)
- Lowest elevation: 36 m (118 ft)
- Population (2023): 338
  - Density: 40.8/km^{2} (106/sq mi)
- Time zone: UTC+01:00 (CET)
  - Summer (DST): UTC+02:00 (CEST)
- INSEE/Postal code: 53233 /53290
- ^{1} French Land Register data, which excludes lakes, ponds, glaciers > 1 km^{2} (0.386 sq mi or 247 acres) and river estuaries.

Saint-Loup-du-Dorat (French pronunciation: [sɛ̃ lu dy dɔʁa]) is a commune in the Mayenne department in north-western France.

== Geography ==
The Vaige forms most of the commune's north-eastern border.

== See also ==
- Communes of the Mayenne department
