= Val-du-Maine =

- Commune
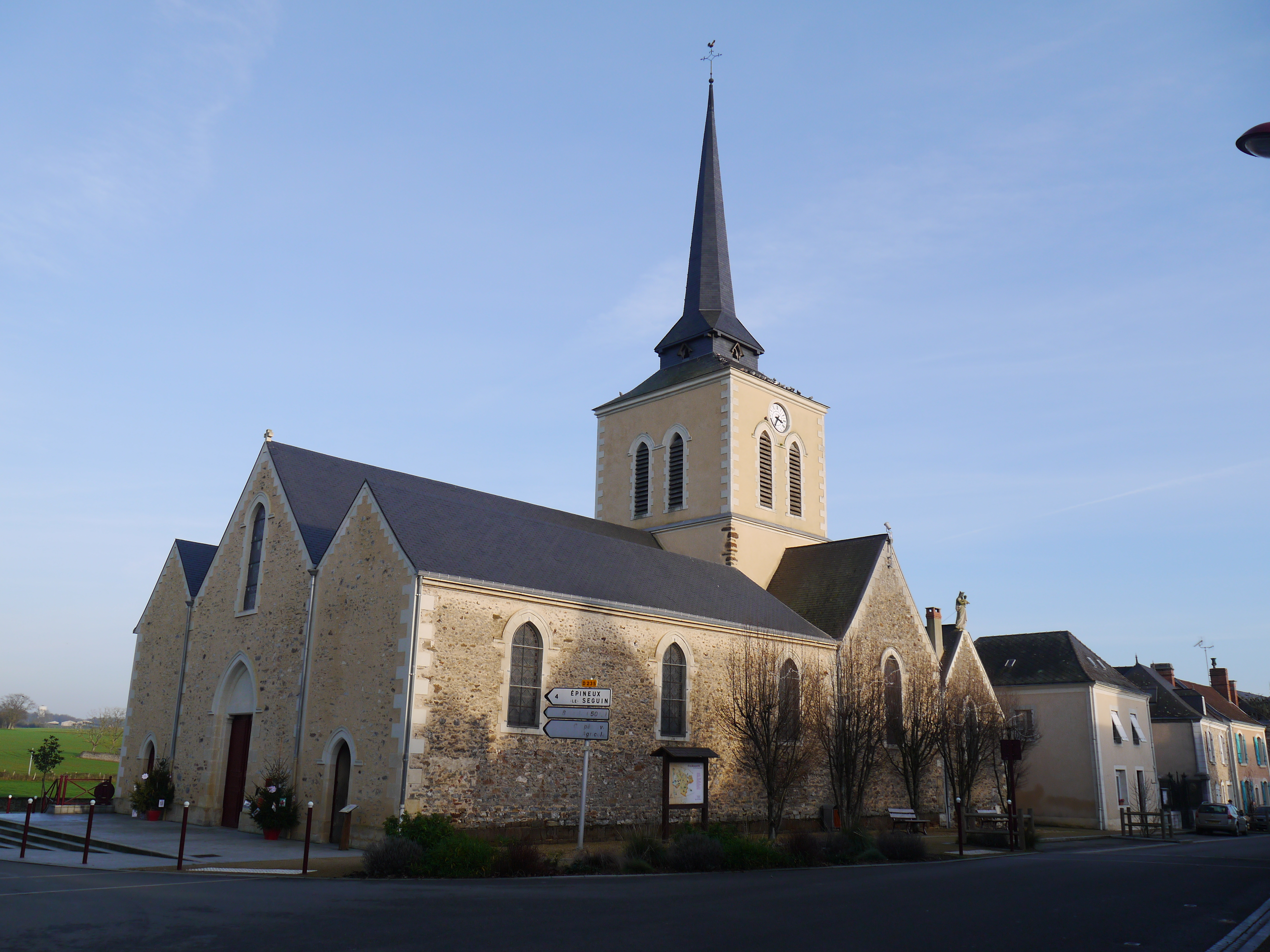
- The church of Ballée
- Location of Val-du-Maine
- Location within France Location within Pays de la Loire
- Coordinates: 47°55′59″N 0°24′58″W
- Country: France
- Region: Pays de la Loire
- Department: Mayenne
- Arrondissement: Château-Gontier
- Canton: Meslay-du-Maine
- Intercommunality: Pays de Meslay-Grez

Government
  - Mayor (2021–2026): Stéphane Desnoë
- Area^{1}: 23.67 km^{2} (9.14 sq mi)
- Highest elevation: 91 m (299 ft)
- Lowest elevation: 37 m (121 ft)
- Population (2023): 952
  - Density: 40.2/km^{2} (104/sq mi)
- Time zone: UTC+01:00 (CET)
  - Summer (DST): UTC+02:00 (CEST)
- INSEE/Postal code: 53017 /53340
- ^{1} French Land Register data, which excludes lakes, ponds, glaciers > 1 km^{2} (0.386 sq mi or 247 acres) and river estuaries.

Val-du-Maine (French pronunciation: [val dy mɛn]) is a commune in the department of Mayenne, western France. The municipality was established on 1 January 2017 by merger of the former communes of Ballée (the seat) and Épineux-le-Seguin.

== See also ==
- Communes of the Mayenne department
