= Épineux-le-Seguin =

- Part of Val-du-Maine
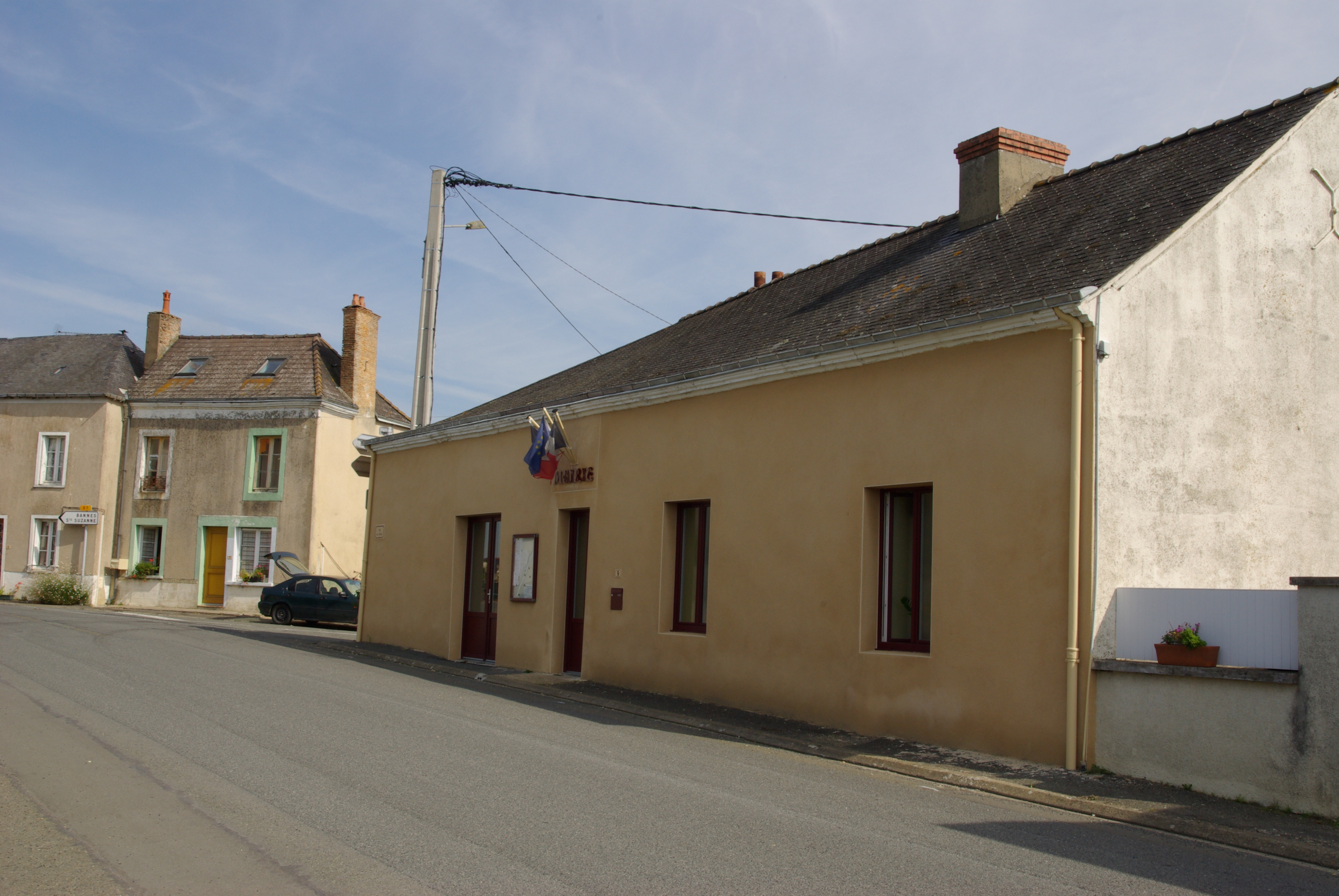
- The town hall
- Location of Épineux-le-Seguin
- Location within France Location within Pays de la Loire
- Coordinates: 47°56′34″N 0°21′34″W
- Country: France
- Region: Pays de la Loire
- Department: Mayenne
- Arrondissement: Laval
- Canton: Meslay-du-Maine
- Commune: Val-du-Maine
- Area^{1}: 9.48 km^{2} (3.66 sq mi)
- Highest elevation: 91 m (299 ft)
- Lowest elevation: 37 m (121 ft)
- Population (2022): 267
  - Density: 28.2/km^{2} (72.9/sq mi)
- Time zone: UTC+01:00 (CET)
  - Summer (DST): UTC+02:00 (CEST)
- Postal code: 53340
- ^{1} French Land Register data, which excludes lakes, ponds, glaciers > 1 km^{2} (0.386 sq mi or 247 acres) and river estuaries.

Épineux-le-Seguin (French pronunciation: [epinø lə səɡɛ̃]) is a former commune in the Mayenne department in north-western France. On 1 January 2017, it was merged into the new commune Val-du-Maine.

== See also ==
- Communes of the Mayenne department
