= Saint-Georges-le-Fléchard =

- Commune
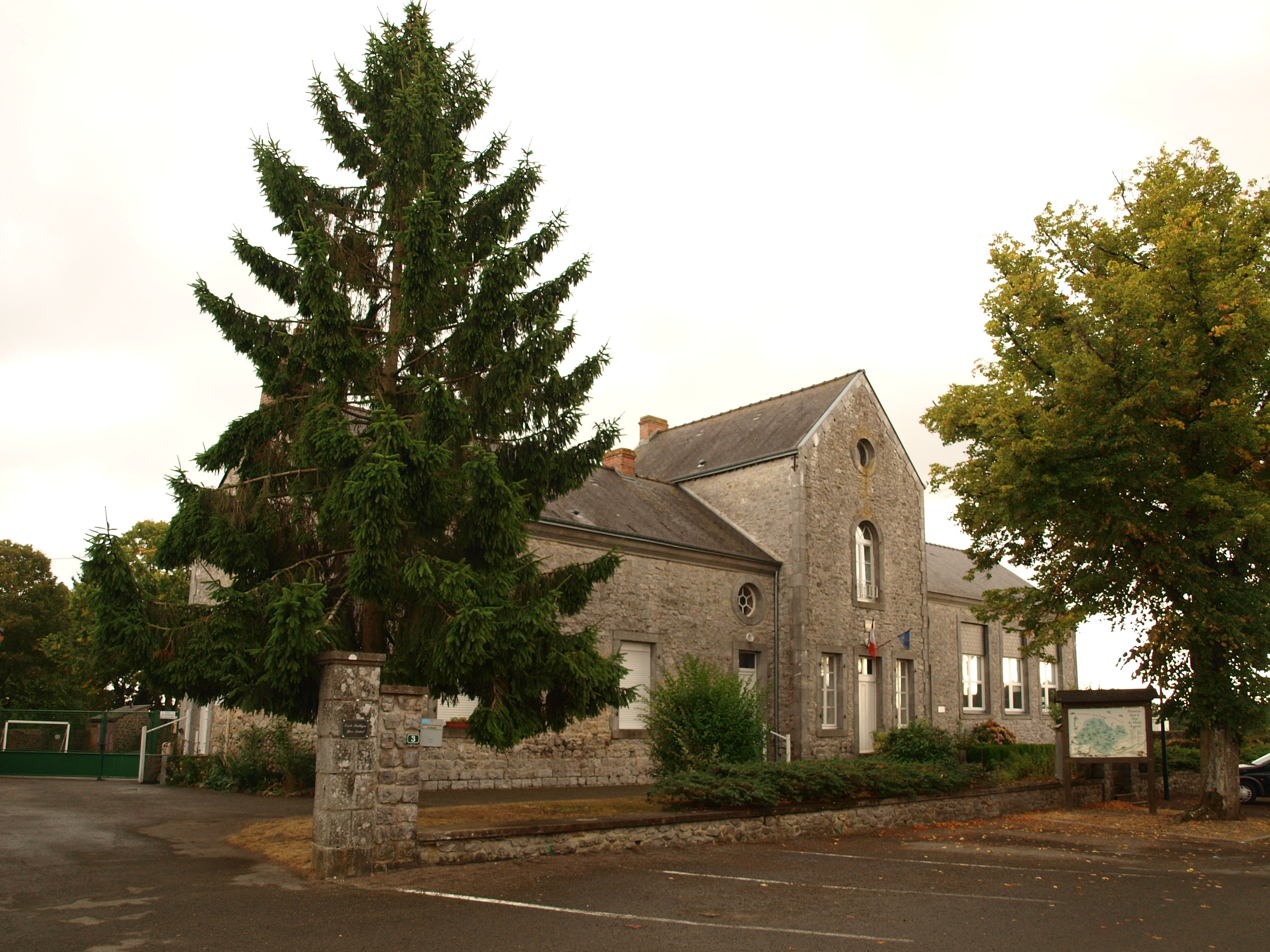
- The school and town hall in Saint-Georges-le-Fléchard
- Location of Saint-Georges-le-Fléchard
- Location within France Location within Pays de la Loire
- Coordinates: 48°02′15″N 0°30′31″W
- Country: France
- Region: Pays de la Loire
- Department: Mayenne
- Arrondissement: Mayenne
- Canton: Meslay-du-Maine
- Intercommunality: CC des Coëvrons

Government
  - Mayor (2020–2026): Arlette Leutelier
- Area^{1}: 8.44 km^{2} (3.26 sq mi)
- Elevation: 90 m (300 ft)
- Highest elevation: 112 m (367 ft)
- Lowest elevation: 70 m (230 ft)
- Population (2023): 373
  - Density: 44.2/km^{2} (114/sq mi)
- Time zone: UTC+01:00 (CET)
  - Summer (DST): UTC+02:00 (CEST)
- INSEE/Postal code: 53220 /53480
- ^{1} French Land Register data, which excludes lakes, ponds, glaciers > 1 km^{2} (0.386 sq mi or 247 acres) and river estuaries.

Saint-Georges-le-Fléchard (French pronunciation: [sɛ̃ ʒɔʁʒ lə fleʃaʁ]) is a commune in the Mayenne department in north-western France.

== Geography ==
The Vaige forms most of the commune's eastern border.

== See also ==
- Communes of the Mayenne department
