= Vaiges =

- Commune
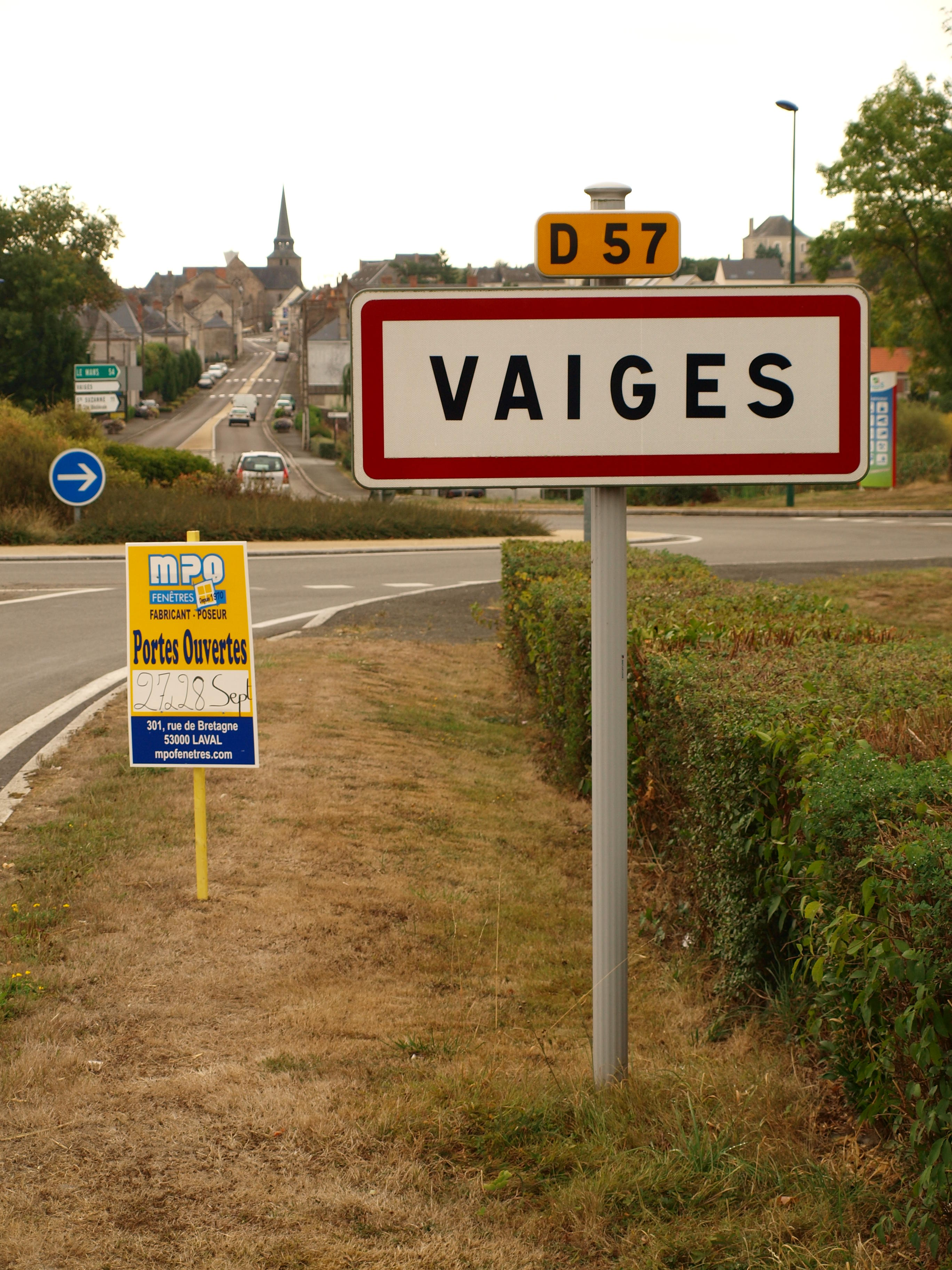
- The road into Vaiges
- Location of Vaiges
- Location within France Location within Pays de la Loire
- Coordinates: 48°02′29″N 0°28′29″W
- Country: France
- Region: Pays de la Loire
- Department: Mayenne
- Arrondissement: Mayenne
- Canton: Meslay-du-Maine

Government
  - Mayor (2020–2026): Régis Lefeuvre
- Area^{1}: 36.26 km^{2} (14.00 sq mi)
- Elevation: 91 m (299 ft)
- Highest elevation: 126 m (413 ft)
- Lowest elevation: 67 m (220 ft)
- Population (2023): 1,178
  - Density: 32.49/km^{2} (84.14/sq mi)
- Time zone: UTC+01:00 (CET)
  - Summer (DST): UTC+02:00 (CEST)
- INSEE/Postal code: 53267 /53480
- ^{1} French Land Register data, which excludes lakes, ponds, glaciers > 1 km^{2} (0.386 sq mi or 247 acres) and river estuaries.

Vaiges (French pronunciation: [vɛʒ]) is a commune in the Mayenne department and Pays de la Loire region of France.

== Geography ==
The river Vaige forms part of the commune's northern border, then traverses the commune's territory from north to south before forming part of its south-western border.

== See also ==
- Communes of the Mayenne department
