= Sainte-Suzanne-et-Chammes =

- Commune
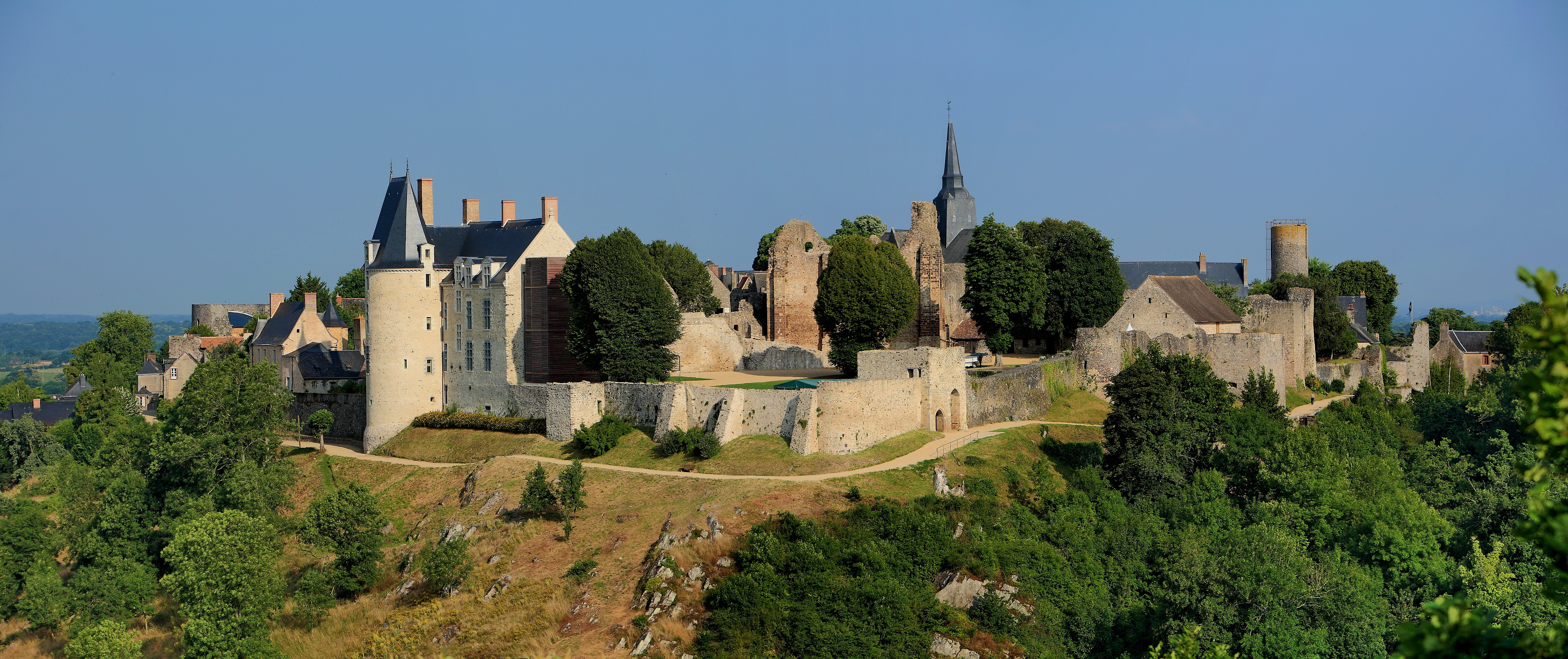
- A general view of Sainte-Suzanne

- Coat of arms
- Location of Sainte-Suzanne-et-Chammes
- Location within France Location within Pays de la Loire
- Coordinates: 48°05′49″N 0°20′56″W
- Country: France
- Region: Pays de la Loire
- Department: Mayenne
- Arrondissement: Mayenne
- Canton: Meslay-du-Maine

Government
  - Mayor (2020–2026): Michel Galvane
- Area^{1}: 44.20 km^{2} (17.07 sq mi)
- Population (2023): 1,175
  - Density: 26.58/km^{2} (68.85/sq mi)
- Time zone: UTC+01:00 (CET)
  - Summer (DST): UTC+02:00 (CEST)
- INSEE/Postal code: 53255 /53270
- ^{1} French Land Register data, which excludes lakes, ponds, glaciers > 1 km^{2} (0.386 sq mi or 247 acres) and river estuaries.

Sainte-Suzanne-et-Chammes (French pronunciation: [sɛ̃t syzan e ʃam]) is a commune in the department of Mayenne, western France. The municipality was established on 1 January 2016 by merger of the former communes of Sainte-Suzanne and Chammes.

== See also ==
- Communes of the Mayenne department
