= Siege of Sainte-Suzanne =

Four year siege of the castle at Saint-Suzanne

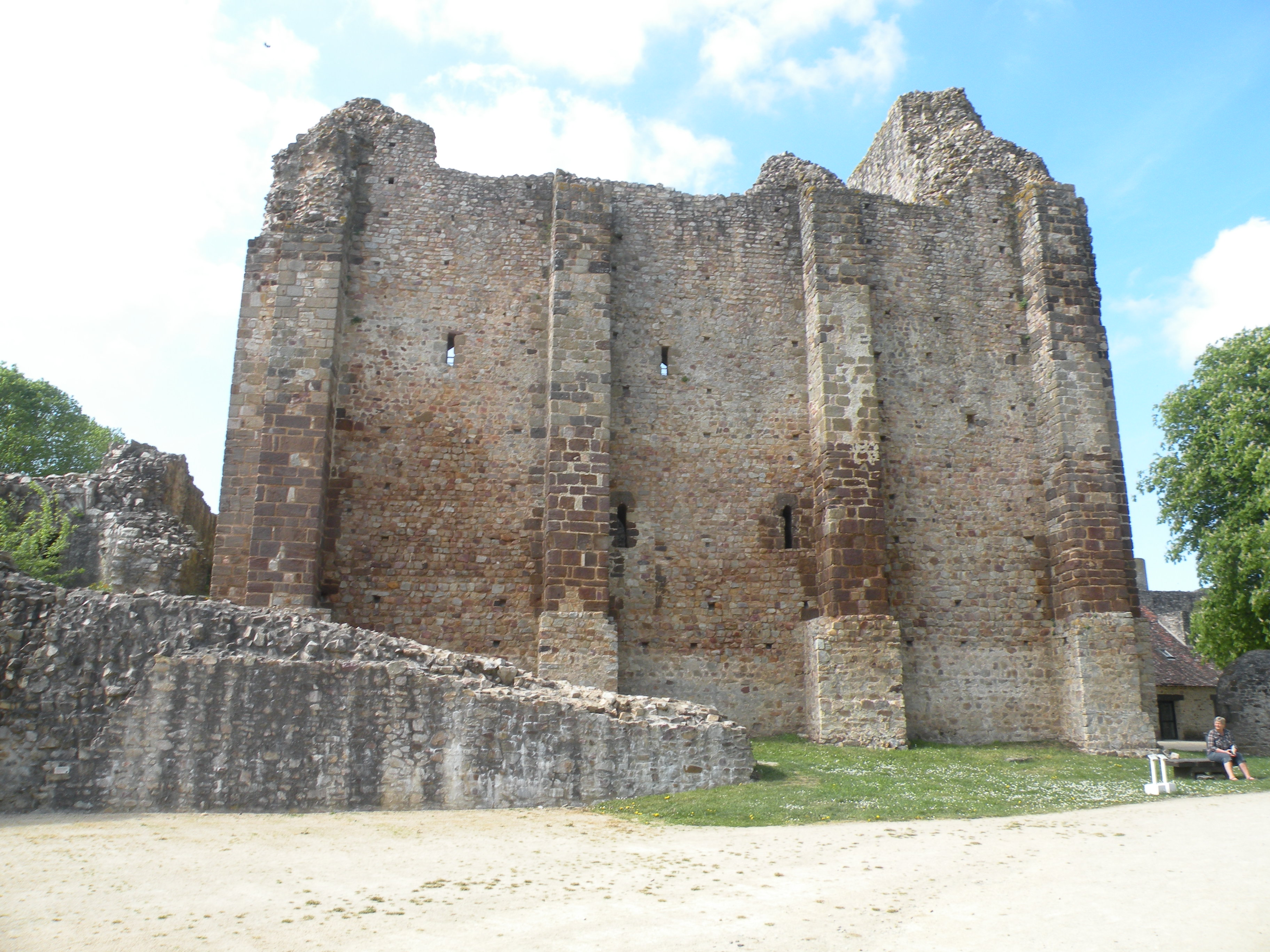
The ruins of the keep (donjon) of St-Suzanne (2014)

The siege of the castle at Saint-Suzanne took place in a four-year period from 1083 to 1086, when the forces of William the Conqueror attempted to quell a rebellion led by Hubert de Beaumont-au-Maine and his liege lords against the rule of William. This was the only castle in Normandy that William did not succeed in taking.

Hubert was moved to action by the cause of Fulk IV, Count of Anjou, and Hugh V, Count of Maine. He was supported by Robert of Nevers, Baron of Craon, son of Renauld I, Count of Nevers, and uncle of Hubert's wife Ermengarde de Nevers.

During the siege, William built a huge military camp known as Beugy on the outskirts of the town, taking advantage of Roman earthworks. William's garrison was under the command of Alan Rufus from 1083 to 1085.

William, Count of Évreux, participated in the siege and was taken captive in 1085. It is not clear under what terms he was released, but somewhat later he forfeited significant holdings.

Richer d'Aigle, son-in-law of Richard le Goz, Viscount of Avranches, died in the siege, mortally wounded by an arrow to the eye, and was buried at the monastery of Saint-Sulpice. Orderic Vitalis records that in January 1086, William de Warenne, 1st Earl of Surrey, wanting to avenge Richer's death, unsuccessfully attacked the castle. He was accompanied by Richer's brother Gilbert l'Aigle and Baudry II de Guitry. Robert de Vieux-Pont was also killed in the siege but it is unclear which side he supported.

With the siege faltering as the castle turned out to be exceptionally well-defended, Alan Rufus eventually turned over command to another Breton who was later killed. With many knights killed or captured, William eventually came to terms with the rebels, with Hubert being restored to favor.

== Sources ==
- Dunbabin, Jean, France in the Making, 843–1180, Second Edition, Oxford University Press, Oxford, 2005
- Forester, Thomas (Translator), Ordericus Vitalis, The Ecclesiastical History of England and Normandy, Henry G. Bohn, London, 1854
- Jessee, W. Scott, Robert the Burgundian and the Counts of Anjou, ca. 1025–1098, Catholic University Press of America, 2000
- Keats-Rohan, K, Domesday People: A Prosopography of Persons Occurring in English Documents, 1066–1166, Boydell Press, Suffolk, 1999
