= Saint-Denis-du-Maine =

- Commune
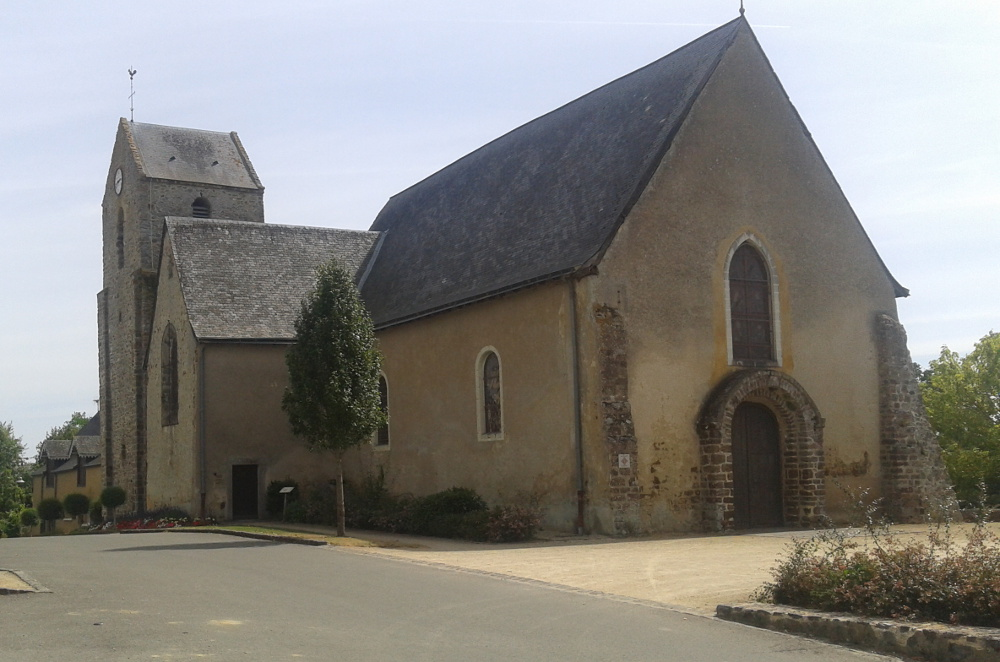
- The church in Saint-Denis-du-Maine
- Location of Saint-Denis-du-Maine
- Location within France Location within Pays de la Loire
- Coordinates: 47°58′03″N 0°31′34″W
- Country: France
- Region: Pays de la Loire
- Department: Mayenne
- Arrondissement: Château-Gontier
- Canton: Meslay-du-Maine

Government
  - Mayor (2020–2026): Bernard Boizard
- Area^{1}: 14.55 km^{2} (5.62 sq mi)
- Elevation: 63 m (207 ft)
- Highest elevation: 98 m (322 ft)
- Lowest elevation: 52 m (171 ft)
- Population (2023): 449
  - Density: 30.9/km^{2} (79.9/sq mi)
- Time zone: UTC+01:00 (CET)
  - Summer (DST): UTC+02:00 (CEST)
- INSEE/Postal code: 53212 /53170
- ^{1} French Land Register data, which excludes lakes, ponds, glaciers > 1 km^{2} (0.386 sq mi or 247 acres) and river estuaries.

Saint-Denis-du-Maine (French pronunciation: [sɛ̃ dəni dy mɛn]) is a commune in the Mayenne department in north-western France.

== Geography ==
The Vaige forms most of the commune's eastern border.

== See also ==
- Communes of Mayenne
