= Bazougers =

- Commune
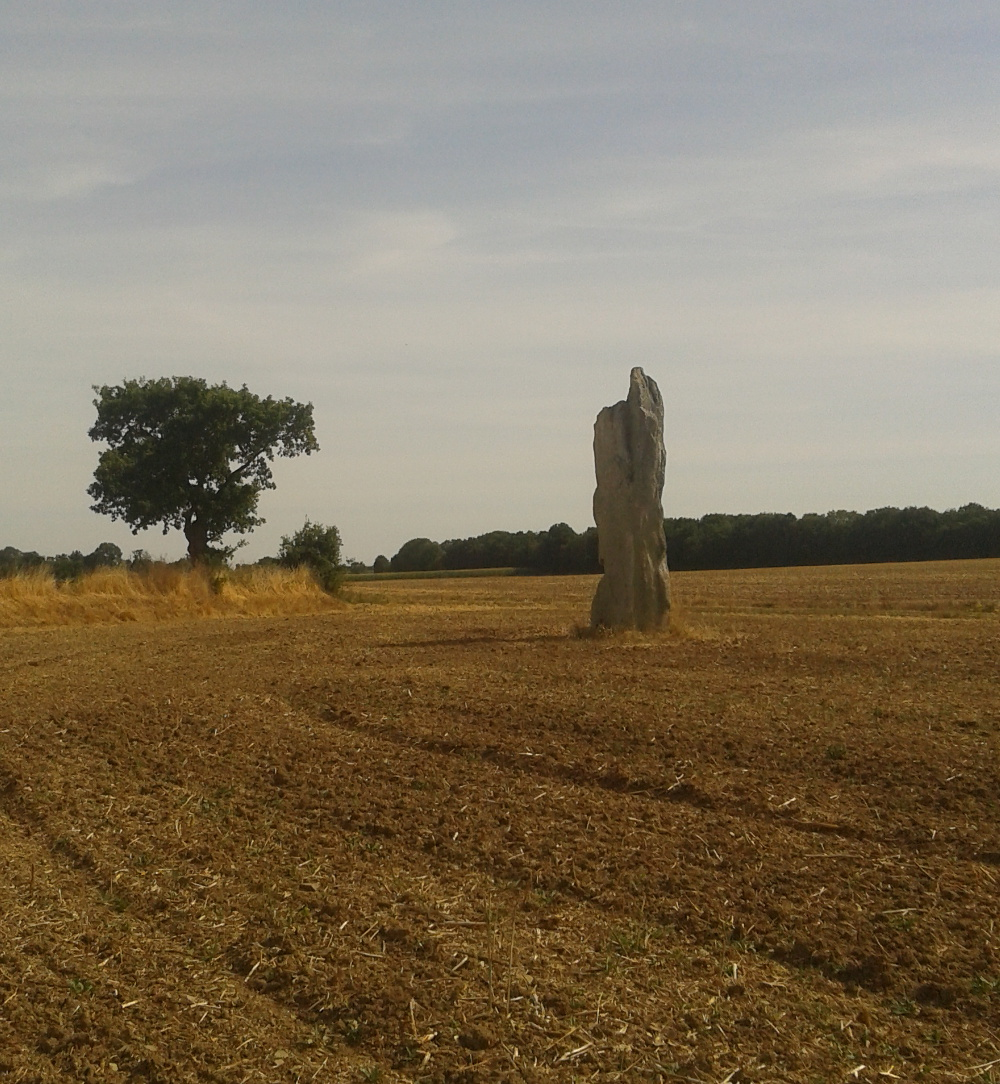
- The Menhir de la Hune, in Bazougers

- Coat of arms
- Location of Bazougers
- Location within France Location within Pays de la Loire
- Coordinates: 48°01′02″N 0°34′47″W
- Country: France
- Region: Pays de la Loire
- Department: Mayenne
- Arrondissement: Château-Gontier
- Canton: Meslay-du-Maine

Government
  - Mayor (2020–2026): Jérôme Landelle
- Area^{1}: 31.72 km^{2} (12.25 sq mi)
- Elevation: 83 m (272 ft)
- Highest elevation: 108 m (354 ft)
- Lowest elevation: 52 m (171 ft)
- Population (2023): 1,079
  - Density: 34.02/km^{2} (88.10/sq mi)
- Time zone: UTC+01:00 (CET)
  - Summer (DST): UTC+02:00 (CEST)
- INSEE/Postal code: 53025 /53170
- ^{1} French Land Register data, which excludes lakes, ponds, glaciers > 1 km^{2} (0.386 sq mi or 247 acres) and river estuaries.

Bazougers (French pronunciation: [bazuʒe]) is a commune in the Mayenne department in northwestern France.

== Population ==
Historical population
Year	Pop.	±% p.a.
1968	781	—
1975	743	−0.71%
1982	864	+2.18%
1990	869	+0.07%
1999	933	+0.79%
2007	981	+0.63%
2012	1,109	+2.48%
2017	1,106	−0.05%
2023	1,079	−0.41%
Source: INSEE

== See also ==
- Communes of Mayenne
