= Françoise Gandriau =

French teenager executed by guillotine (1775–1794)

- Born: 17 July 1775 (Note: At least one source has stated that she was born in 1777 or 1778, however modern sources assert that she was born on 17 July 1775.); Fontenay-le-Comte, Kingdom of France
- Died: 7 March 1794 (aged 18); Lassay-les-Châteaux, Mayenne, First French Republic
- Known for: Grave became a pilgrimage site after she was guillotined during the Reign of Terror for being an émigrée

Françoise Gandriau (Note: Her surname is commonly written as Gandriau, but other sources have spelled it "Gaudérian" or "Gaudériau".) (17 July 1775 – 7 March 1794), also called the Petite-Émigrée, was a French teenager who was denounced as an émigrée and executed by guillotine during the Reign of Terror period of the French Revolution. After her death, people claimed to witness miracles and unexplained healing, and her grave became a popular pilgrimage site in Lassay-les-Châteaux.

== Biography ==
Françoise Gandriau was born in 1775 in Fontenay-le-Comte in an area of western France called the Vendée. Her father was a shoemaker, and she was one of 14 children in her family. She worked for a noble family, and, during the Virée de Galerne campaign in 1793, she followed her employer and the Catholic and Royal Armies across the Loire. Afterwards, she was separated from her employer and taken in by the former mayor of Lassay-les-Châteaux.

On 17 September 1793, at the start of the Reign of Terror period of the Revolution, (Note: Historians consider 5 September 1793, or the "September journée", to be the beginning of the Reign of Terror.) the Law of Suspects passed and gave the authorities broad powers to prosecute suspected enemies of the Revolution, including émigrés. The following year on 2 February 1794, a juring priest who was hostile to the Vendean royalist rebels denounced Gandriau as an émigrée, and she was arrested. She was encouraged to claim she was pregnant in order to save herself, but she refused. She was condemned to death on 6 March by the "Clément" military commission and then executed by guillotine the following day, on 7 March 1794.

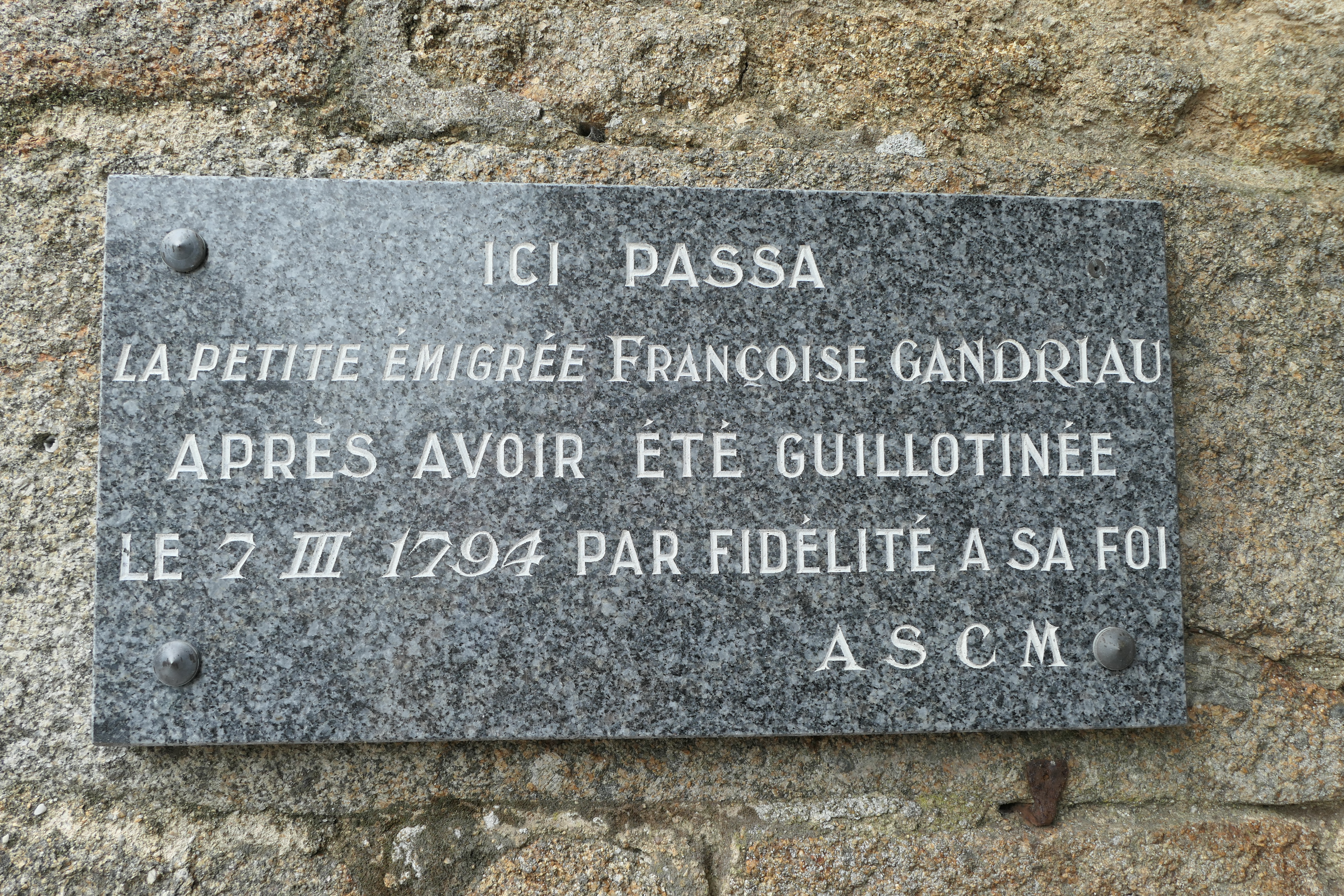
Plaque commemorating Gandriau at the intersection of Cébaudière and Castle streets in Lassay-les-Châteaux

== Legacy ==
After Gandriau's death, her grave was rumored to have miraculous healing powers and became a pilgrimage site. Mothers would bring their young children to her grave, hoping for a blessing that would make their children walk early. Also, children with difficulties walking were encouraged to circle her grave with their crutches and then lay the crutches down in the shape of a cross. A small chapel was built for Gandriau in a grazing field. She has been nicknamed the Petite-Émigrée (transl. little emigrant).

In 2014, a requiem mass was held on the anniversary of Gandriau's execution.

== See also ==
- Chouannerie
- Perrine Dugué – a teenager murdered by Chouans in Mayenne
- Tombe à la fille – "Sainte Pataude", a teenager murdered by Chouans in Brittany
