= Villiers-Charlemagne =

- Commune
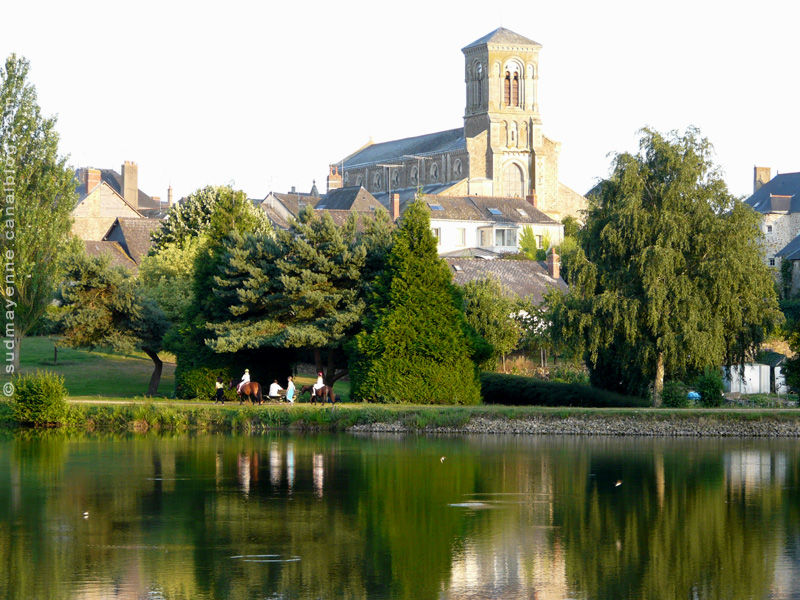
- The church of Saint Martin, in Villiers-Charlemagne

- Coat of arms
- Location of Villiers-Charlemagne
- Location within France Location within Pays de la Loire
- Coordinates: 47°55′23″N 0°40′30″W
- Country: France
- Region: Pays de la Loire
- Department: Mayenne
- Arrondissement: Château-Gontier
- Canton: Meslay-du-Maine

Government
  - Mayor (2020–2026): Jacques Sabin
- Area^{1}: 27.57 km^{2} (10.64 sq mi)
- Elevation: 95 m (312 ft)
- Highest elevation: 113 m (371 ft)
- Lowest elevation: 32 m (105 ft)
- Population (2023): 1,109
  - Density: 40.22/km^{2} (104.2/sq mi)
- Time zone: UTC+01:00 (CET)
  - Summer (DST): UTC+02:00 (CEST)
- INSEE/Postal code: 53273 /53170
- ^{1} French Land Register data, which excludes lakes, ponds, glaciers > 1 km^{2} (0.386 sq mi or 247 acres) and river estuaries.

Villiers-Charlemagne (French pronunciation: [vilje ʃaʁləmaɲ]) is a commune in the Mayenne department in north-western France.

== See also ==
- Communes of the Mayenne department
