= Saint-Léger, Mayenne =

Saint-Léger
- Commune
- Location of Saint-Léger
- Location within France Location within Pays de la Loire
- Coordinates: 48°05′00″N 0°27′16″W
- Country: France
- Region: Pays de la Loire
- Department: Mayenne
- Arrondissement: Mayenne
- Canton: Meslay-du-Maine
- Intercommunality: CC des Coëvrons

Government
  - Mayor (2020–2026): Christine Gesbert
- Area^{1}: 17.22 km^{2} (6.65 sq mi)
- Elevation: 112 m (367 ft)
- Highest elevation: 135 m (443 ft)
- Lowest elevation: 89 m (292 ft)
- Population (2023): 312
  - Density: 18.1/km^{2} (46.9/sq mi)
- Time zone: UTC+01:00 (CET)
  - Summer (DST): UTC+02:00 (CEST)
- INSEE/Postal code: 53232 /53480
- ^{1} French Land Register data, which excludes lakes, ponds, glaciers > 1 km^{2} (0.386 sq mi or 247 acres) and river estuaries.

Saint-Léger (French pronunciation: [sɛ̃ leʒe]) is a commune in the Mayenne department and Pays de la Loire region of France.

== Geography ==
The Vaige has its source in the commune and forms part of its south-western border.

== See also ==
- Communes of the Mayenne department
