= Saint-Pierre-sur-Erve =

- Commune
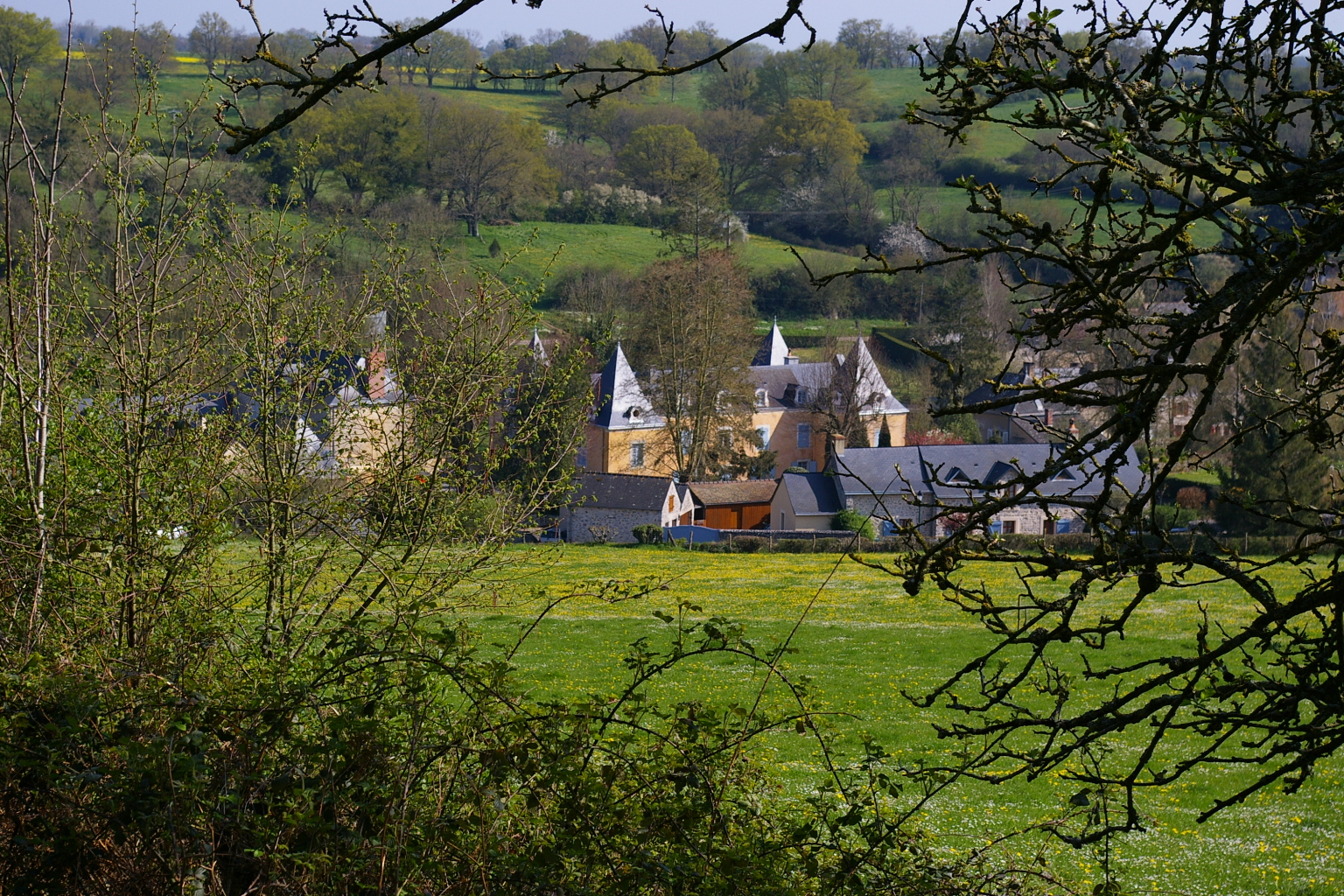
- A general view of Saint-Pierre-sur-Erve
- Location of Saint-Pierre-sur-Erve
- Location within France Location within Pays de la Loire
- Coordinates: 48°00′32″N 0°23′30″W
- Country: France
- Region: Pays de la Loire
- Department: Mayenne
- Arrondissement: Mayenne
- Canton: Meslay-du-Maine

Government
  - Mayor (2020–2026): Christian Le Blanc
- Area^{1}: 9.74 km^{2} (3.76 sq mi)
- Elevation: 82 m (269 ft)
- Highest elevation: 116 m (381 ft)
- Lowest elevation: 57 m (187 ft)
- Population (2023): 130
  - Density: 13/km^{2} (35/sq mi)
- Time zone: UTC+01:00 (CET)
  - Summer (DST): UTC+02:00 (CEST)
- INSEE/Postal code: 53248 /53270
- ^{1} French Land Register data, which excludes lakes, ponds, glaciers > 1 km^{2} (0.386 sq mi or 247 acres) and river estuaries.

Saint-Pierre-sur-Erve (French pronunciation: [sɛ̃ pjɛʁ syʁ ɛʁv]) is a commune in the Mayenne department in north-western France.

== See also ==
- Communes of the Mayenne department
