= Vaige =

River in France

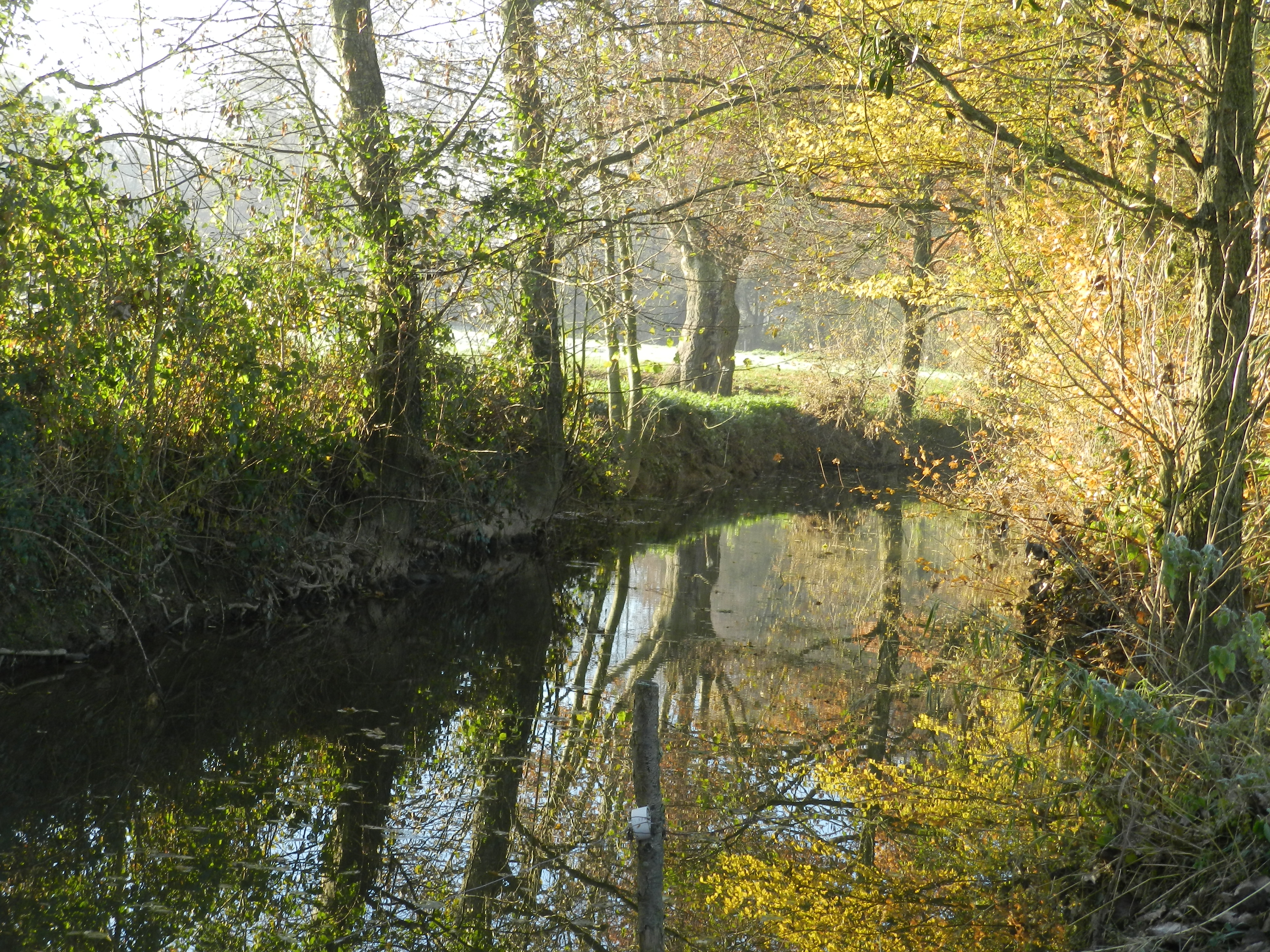
- Vaige river at the south of La Bazouge-de-Chemeré in winter

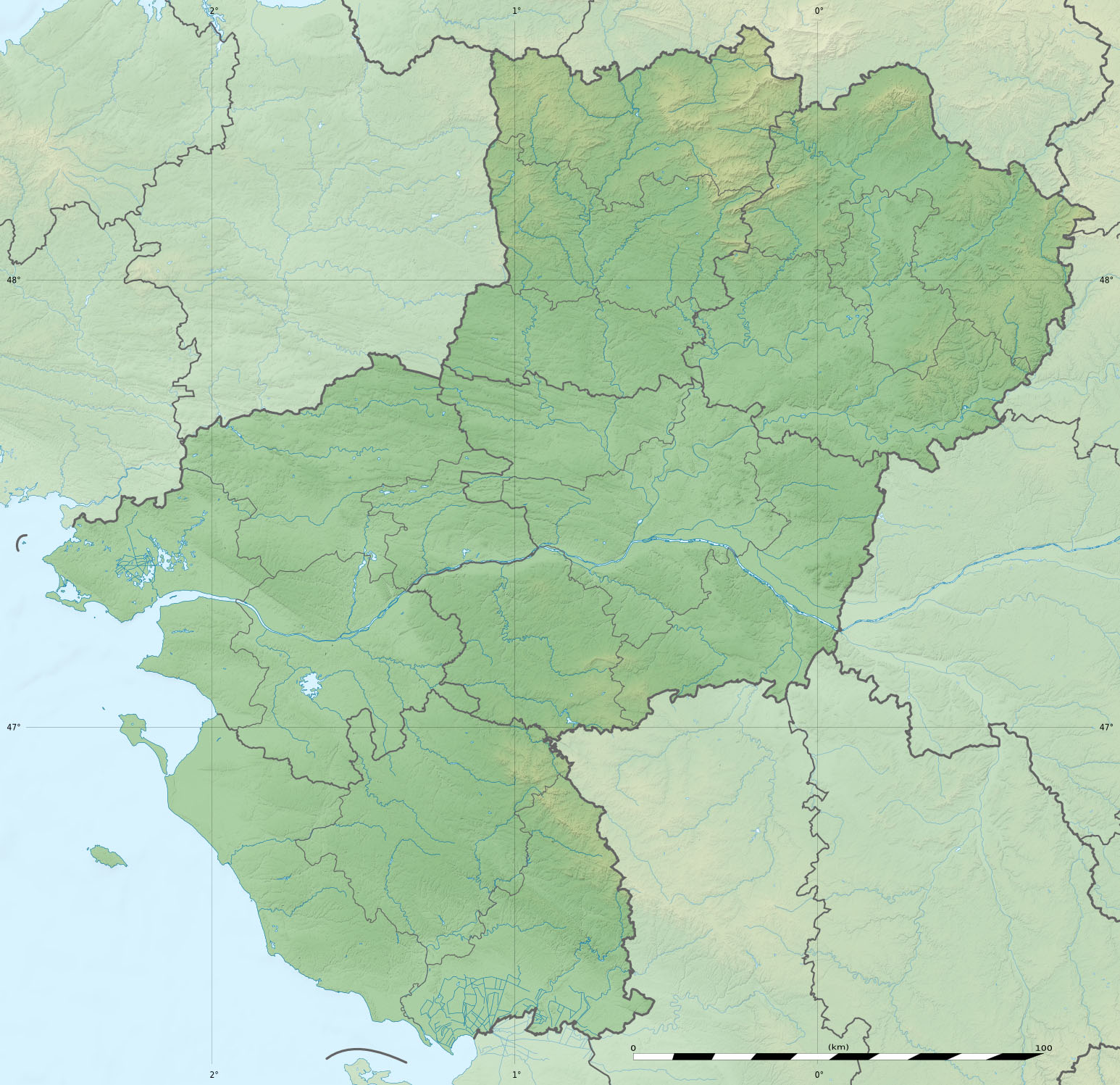
- Location within France Location within Pays de la Loire

Location
- Country: France

Physical characteristics
- Source
  - location: Saint-Léger
  - coordinates: 48°04′52″N 00°28′15″W
  - elevation: 112 m (367 ft)
- Mouth
  - location: Sarthe
  - coordinates: 47°50′15″N 00°19′55″W
  - elevation: 24 m (79 ft)
- Length: 53.6 km (33.3 mi)
- Basin size: 233 km^{2} (90 sq mi)
- Discharge
  - average: 1.48 m^{3}/s (52 cu ft/s)

Basin features
- Progression: Sarthe→ Maine→ Loire→ Atlantic Ocean

The Vaige (French pronunciation: [vɛʒ]) is a 53.6 km (33.3 mi) long river in the Mayenne and Sarthe departments in western France.

This list is ordered from source to mouth:

- In Mayenne, the Vaige has its source in Saint-Léger then waters the following villages: Vaiges, Saint-Georges-le-Fléchard, La Bazouge-de-Chemeré, La Cropte, Saint-Denis-du-Maine, Préaux, Ballée, Beaumont-Pied-de-Bœuf,
- Then the Vaige séparates Mayenne (Saint-Loup-du-Dorat) from Sarthe (Auvers-le-Hamon),
- Only in Mayenne the Vaige waters Bouessay,
- Entering the Sarthe department, the Vaige avoid the Sablé-sur-Sarthe town and flows in the Sarthe (right tributary)

== Low water and flood ==
Very often the river uses to dry at the end of summer and the beginning of autumn, so fishes and river mussels die but kingfishers may fly away.

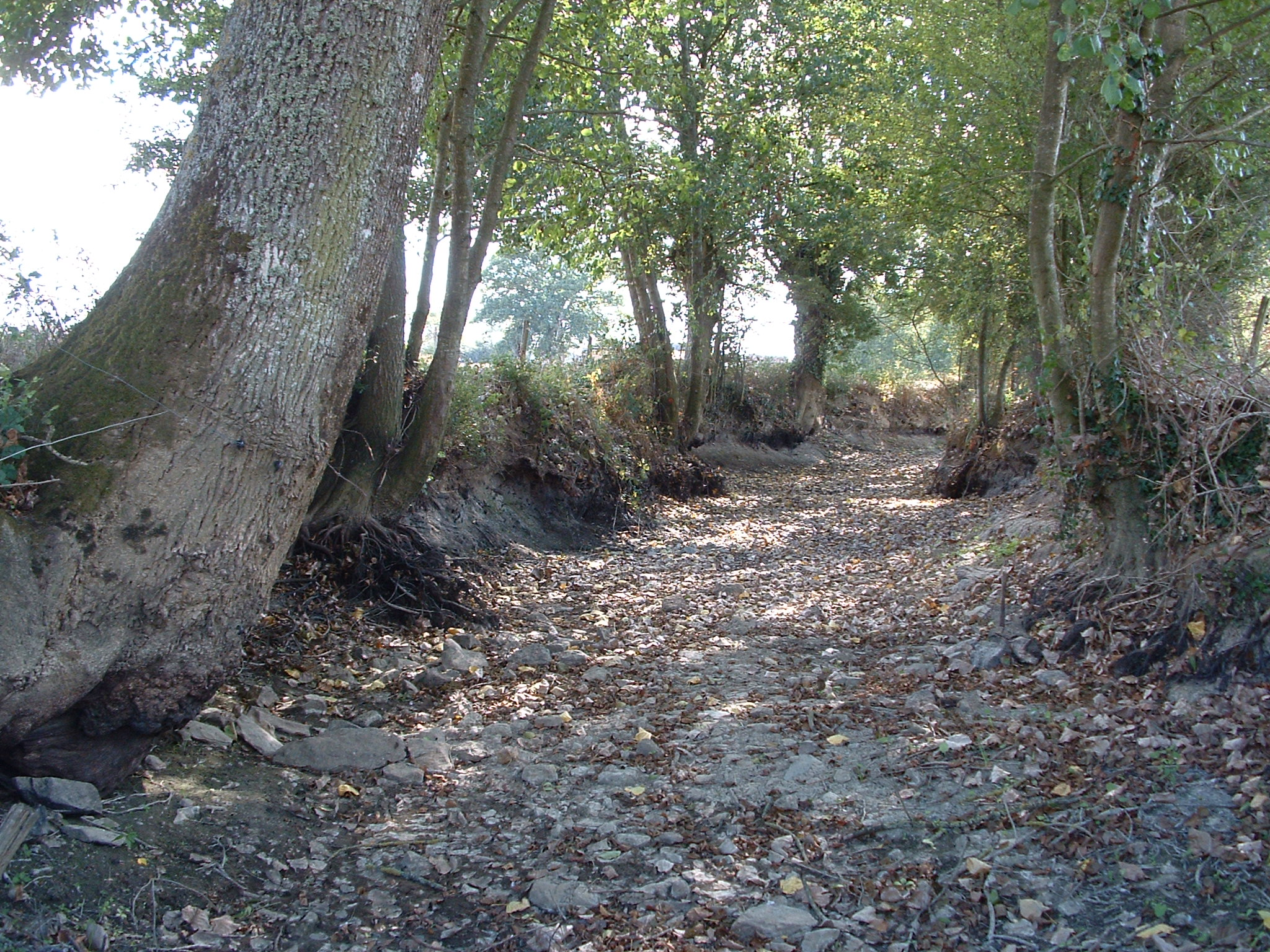
the Vaige dried at the south of the Bazouge-de-Chemeré on September 17, 2005

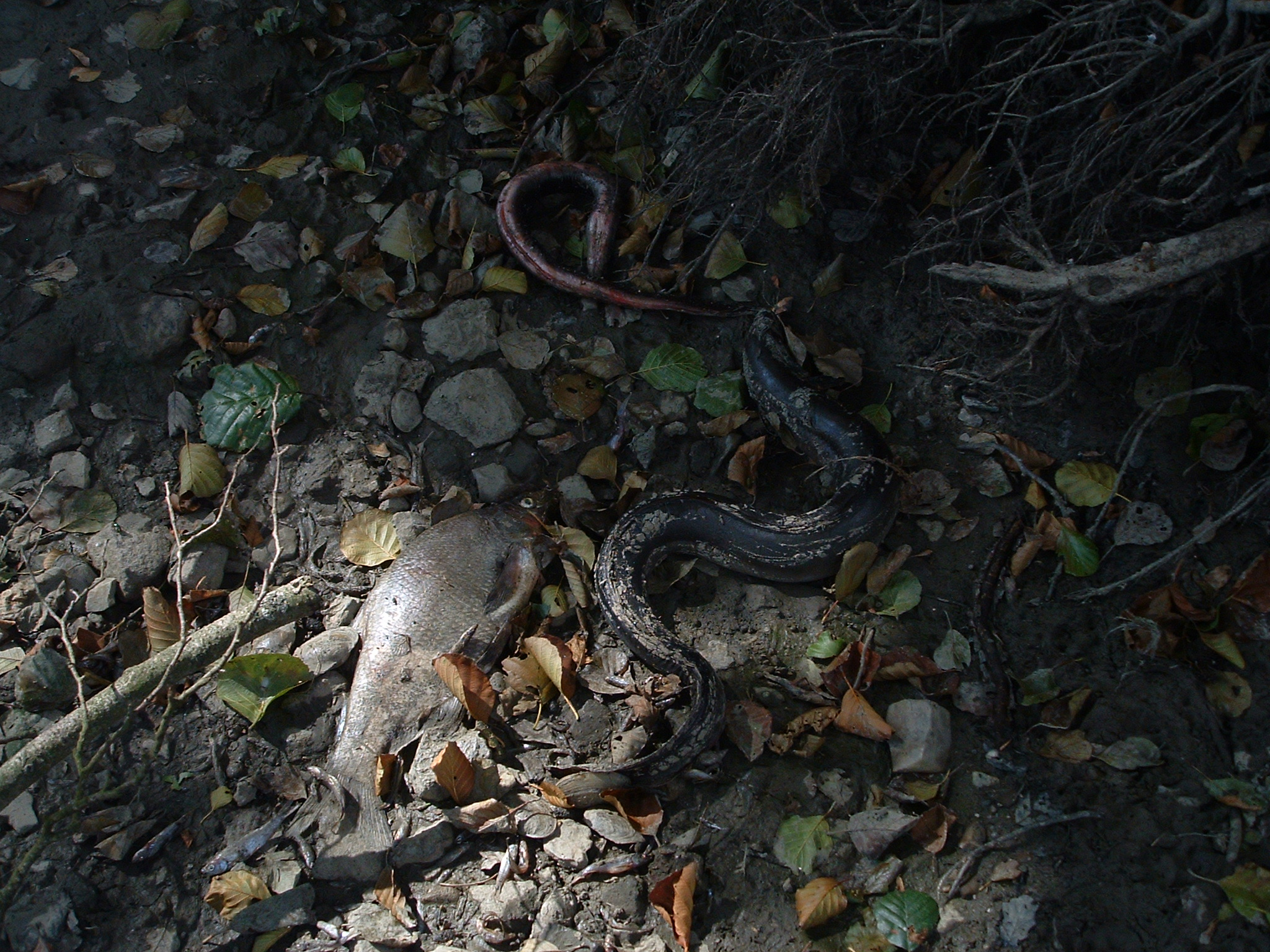
Died fishes in the dried river on 2005

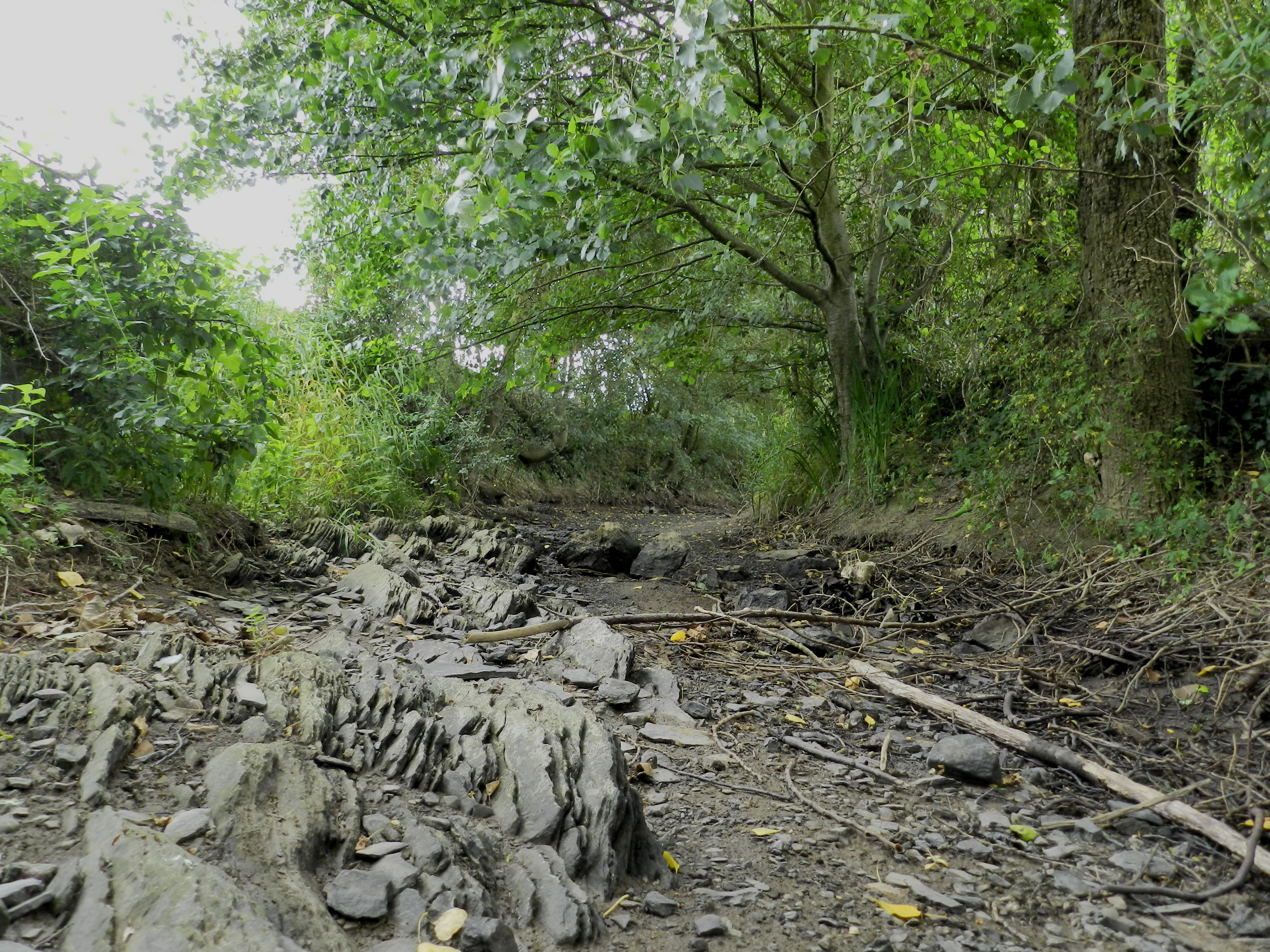
the Vaige dried at the south of the Bazouge-de-Chemeré on June 24, 2017

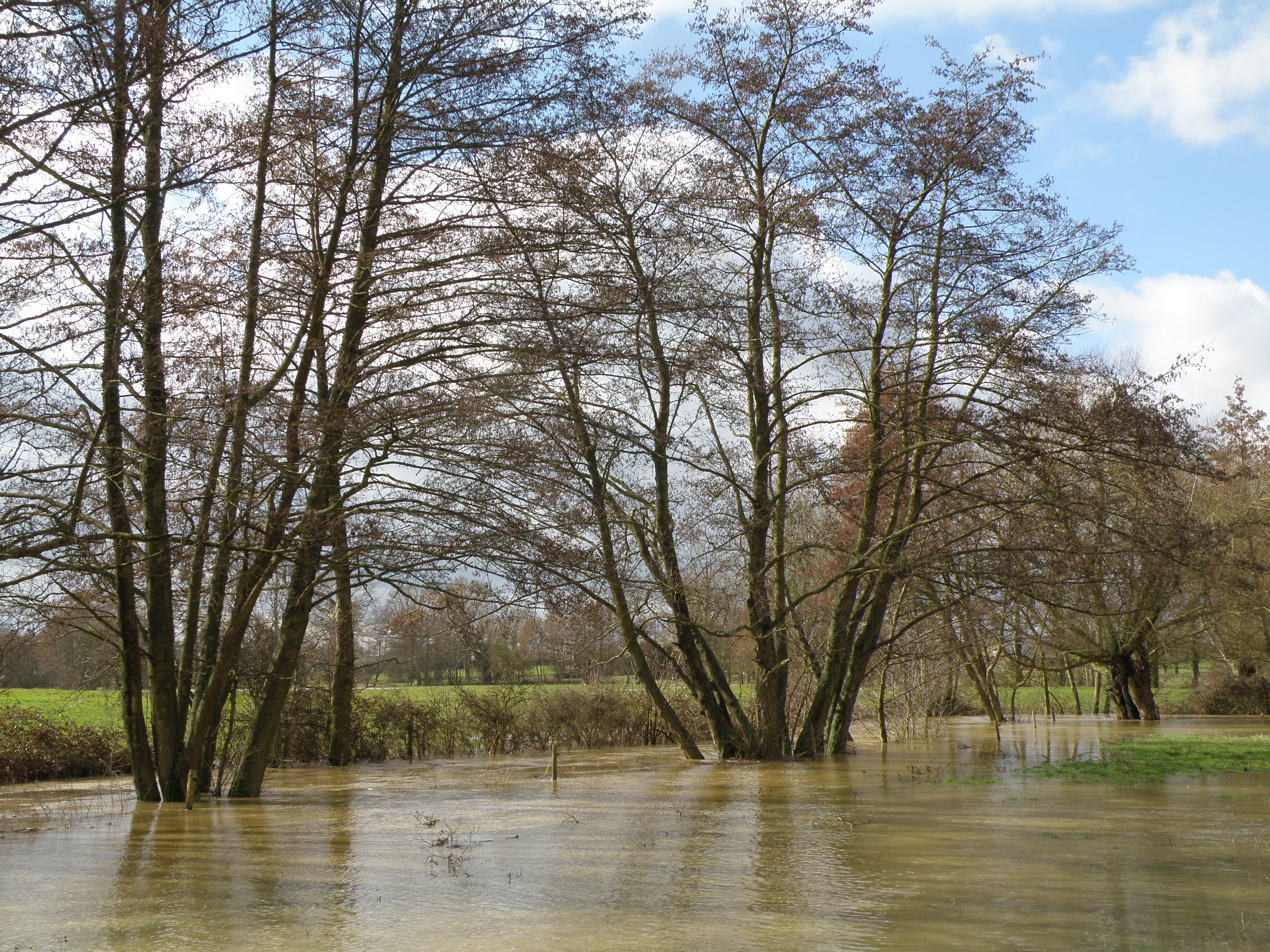
Flood at the south of the Bazouge-de-Chemeré on February 28, 2010

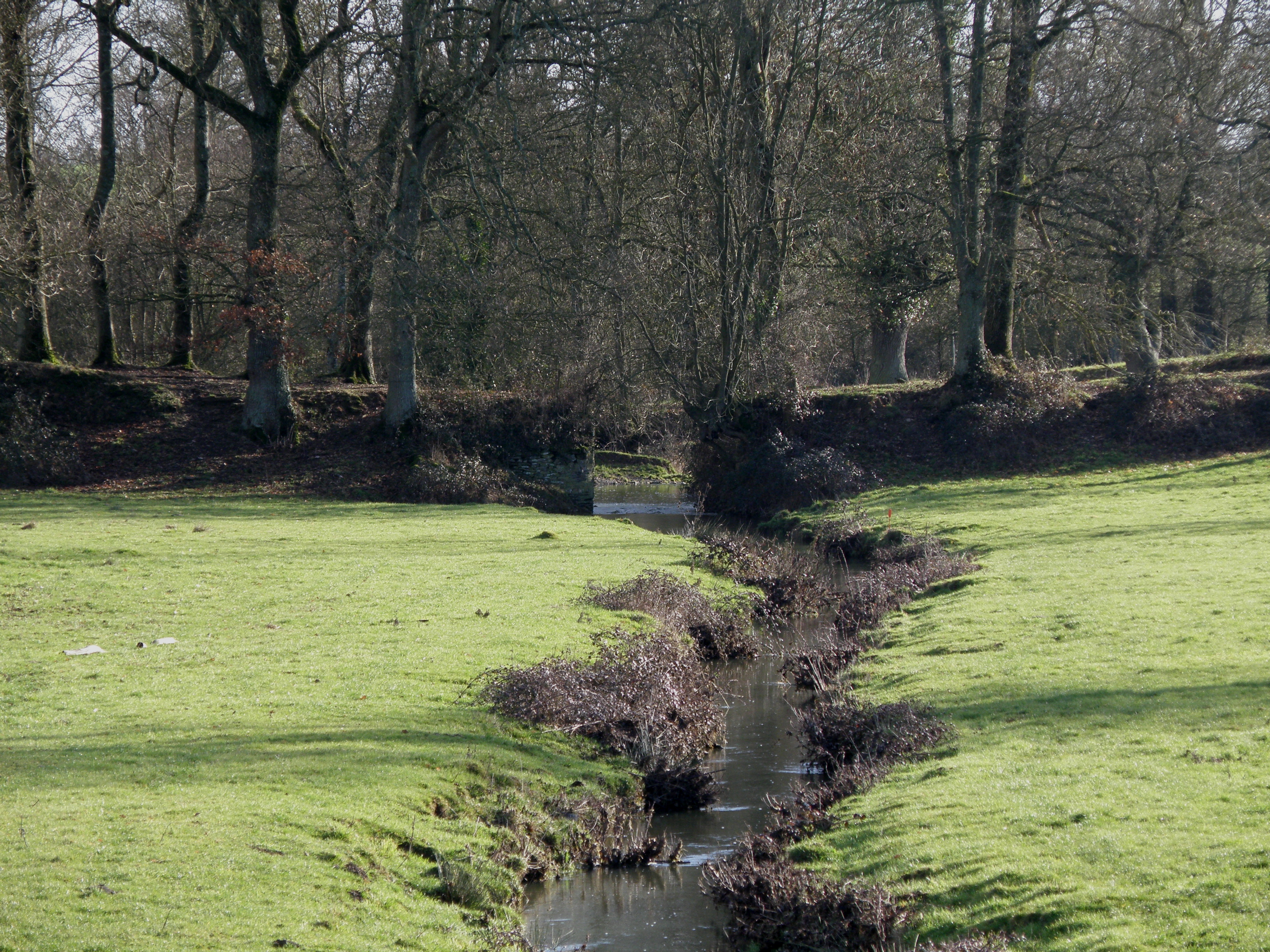
The Chemerette stream passes through an old path before flowing in Vaige river.

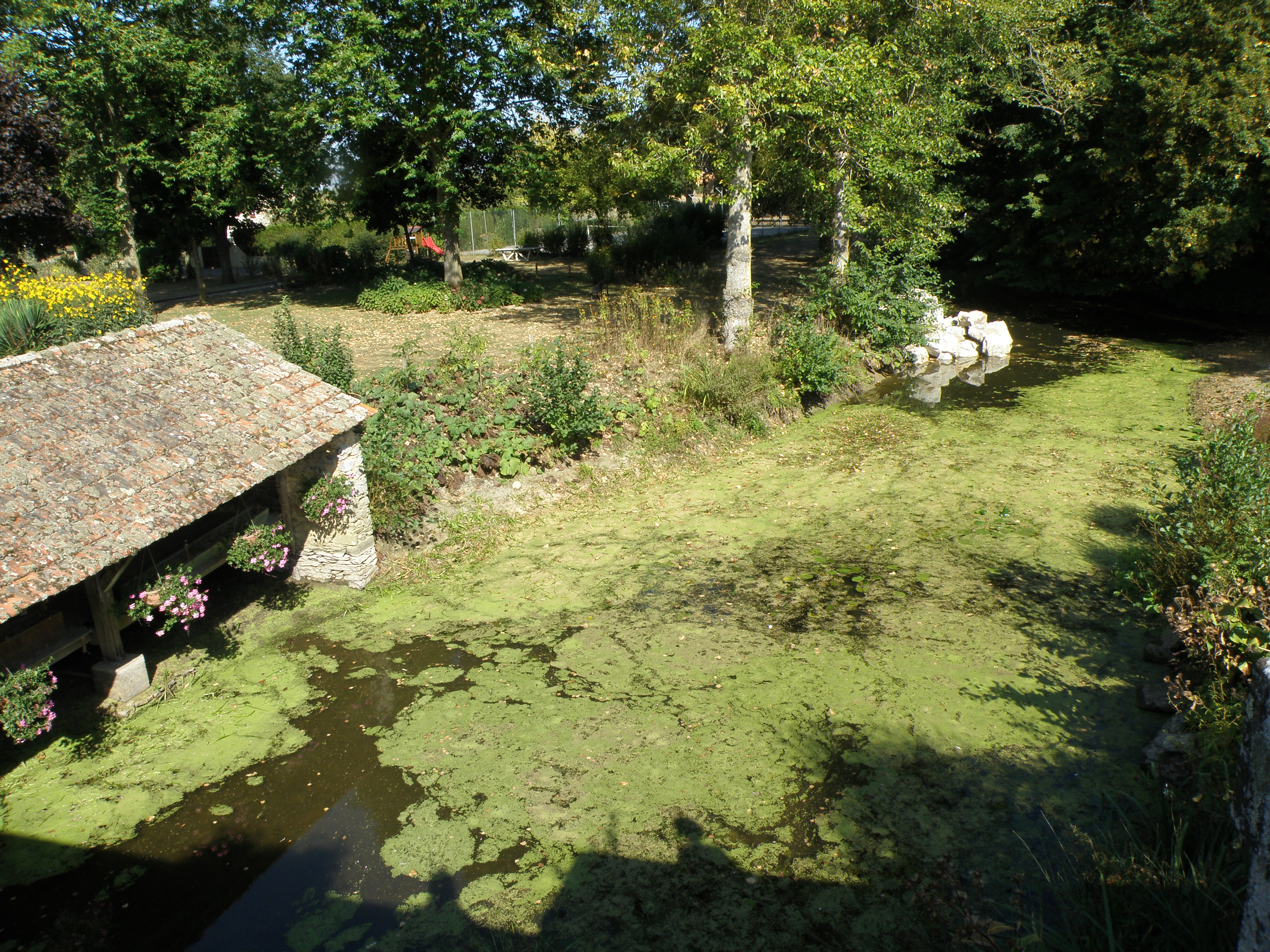
Wash-house in La Cropte
