= Préaux, Mayenne =

Préaux
- Commune
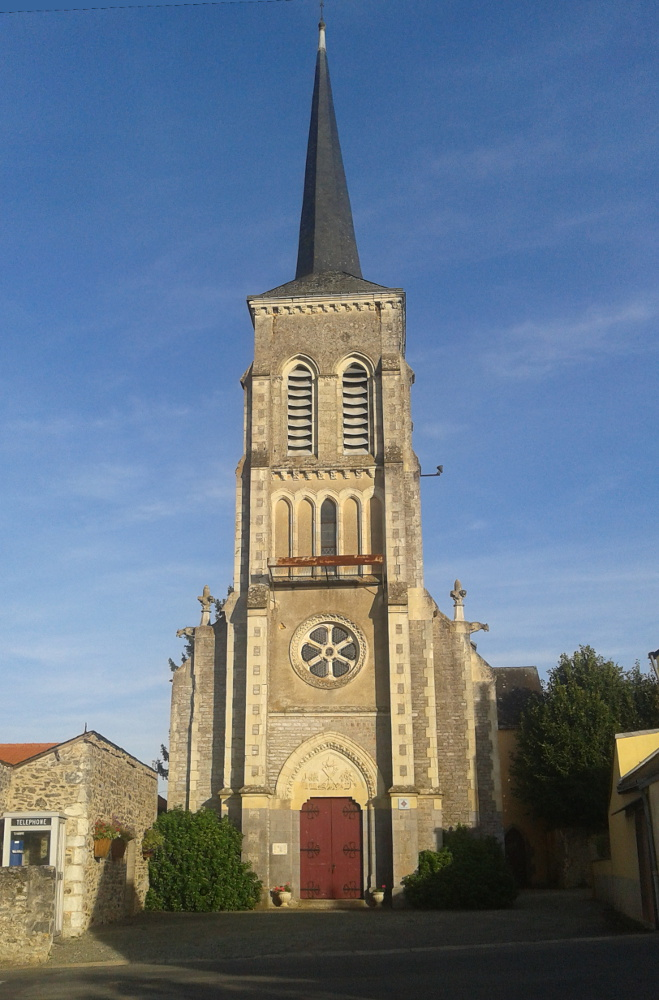
- The church of Saint-Martin, in Préaux
- Location of Préaux
- Location within France Location within Pays de la Loire
- Coordinates: 47°56′12″N 0°27′54″W
- Country: France
- Region: Pays de la Loire
- Department: Mayenne
- Arrondissement: Château-Gontier
- Canton: Meslay-du-Maine

Government
  - Mayor (2020–2026): Roland Foucault
- Area^{1}: 9.58 km^{2} (3.70 sq mi)
- Elevation: 110 m (360 ft)
- Highest elevation: 82 m (269 ft)
- Lowest elevation: 47 m (154 ft)
- Population (2023): 158
  - Density: 16.5/km^{2} (42.7/sq mi)
- Time zone: UTC+01:00 (CET)
  - Summer (DST): UTC+02:00 (CEST)
- INSEE/Postal code: 53184 /53340
- ^{1} French Land Register data, which excludes lakes, ponds, glaciers > 1 km^{2} (0.386 sq mi or 247 acres) and river estuaries.

Préaux (French pronunciation: [pʁeo]) is a commune in the Mayenne department in north-western France.

== Geography ==
The Vaige flows southeastwards through the middle of the commune and forms part of its eastern border.

== See also ==
- Communes of Mayenne
