= Saint-Brice, Mayenne =

Saint-Brice
- Commune
- Location of Saint-Brice
- Location within France Location within Pays de la Loire
- Coordinates: 47°51′38″N 0°26′21″W
- Country: France
- Region: Pays de la Loire
- Department: Mayenne
- Arrondissement: Château-Gontier
- Canton: Meslay-du-Maine

Government
  - Mayor (2020–2026): André Boisseau
- Area^{1}: 13.23 km^{2} (5.11 sq mi)
- Elevation: 71 m (233 ft)
- Highest elevation: 96 m (315 ft)
- Lowest elevation: 33 m (108 ft)
- Population (2023): 517
  - Density: 39.1/km^{2} (101/sq mi)
- Time zone: UTC+01:00 (CET)
  - Summer (DST): UTC+02:00 (CEST)
- INSEE/Postal code: 53203 /53290
- ^{1} French Land Register data, which excludes lakes, ponds, glaciers > 1 km^{2} (0.386 sq mi or 247 acres) and river estuaries.

Saint-Brice (French pronunciation: [sɛ̃ bʁis]) is a commune in the Mayenne department in north-western France.

== See also ==
- Communes of Mayenne
