= Grez-en-Bouère =

- Commune
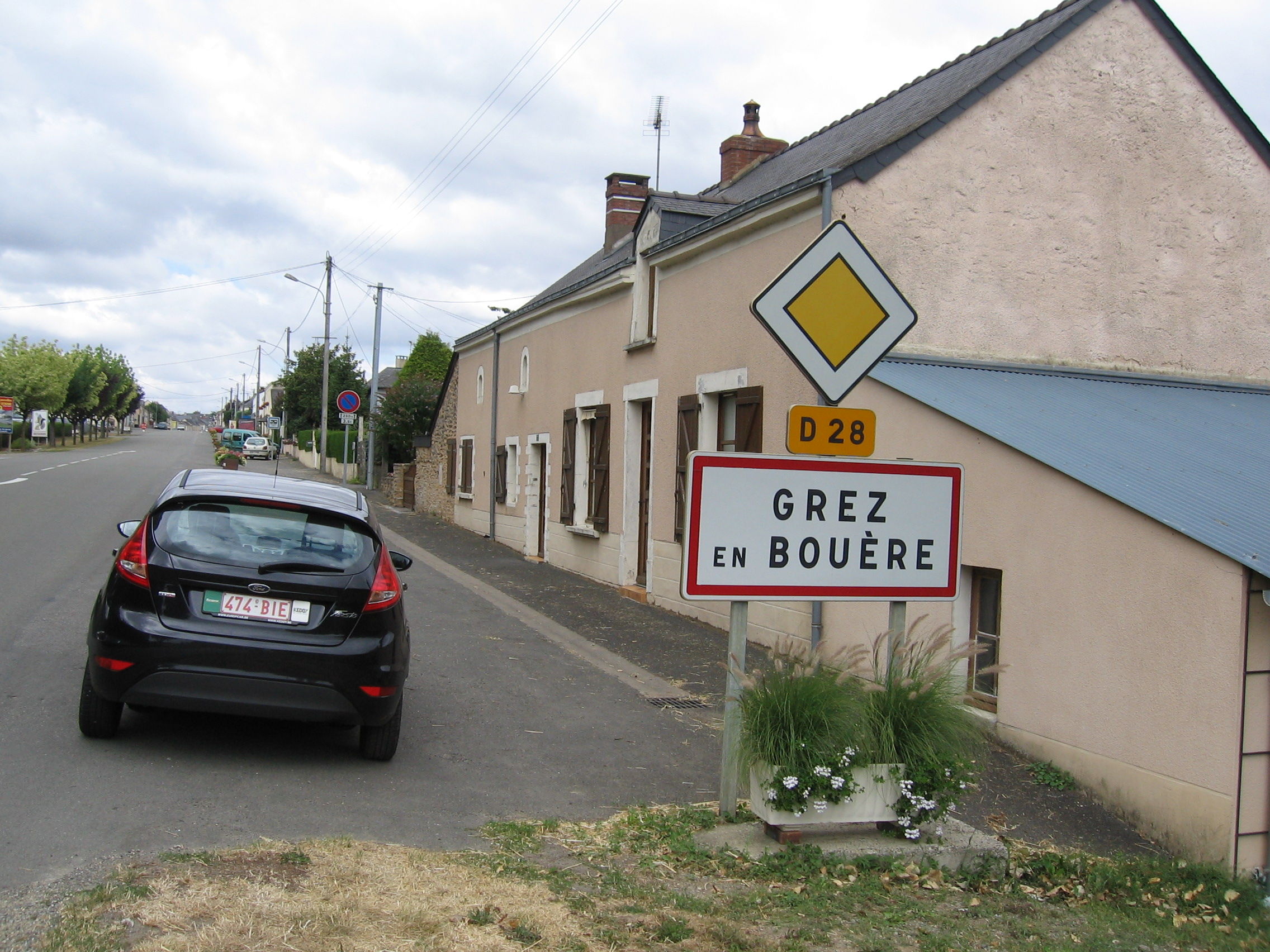
- The road into Grez-en-Bouère
- Location of Grez-en-Bouère
- Location within France Location within Pays de la Loire
- Coordinates: 47°52′30″N 0°31′16″W
- Country: France
- Region: Pays de la Loire
- Department: Mayenne
- Arrondissement: Château-Gontier
- Canton: Meslay-du-Maine

Government
  - Mayor (2021–2026): Jean-Pierre Foucher
- Area^{1}: 27.29 km^{2} (10.54 sq mi)
- Elevation: 85 m (279 ft)
- Highest elevation: 122 m (400 ft)
- Lowest elevation: 64 m (210 ft)
- Population (2023): 980
  - Density: 36/km^{2} (93/sq mi)
- Time zone: UTC+01:00 (CET)
  - Summer (DST): UTC+02:00 (CEST)
- INSEE/Postal code: 53110 /53290
- ^{1} French Land Register data, which excludes lakes, ponds, glaciers > 1 km^{2} (0.386 sq mi or 247 acres) and river estuaries.

Grez-en-Bouère is a commune in the Mayenne department in north-western France.

== See also ==
- Communes of the Mayenne department
