= Beaumont-Pied-de-Bœuf, Mayenne =

Beaumont-Pied-de-Bœuf
- Commune
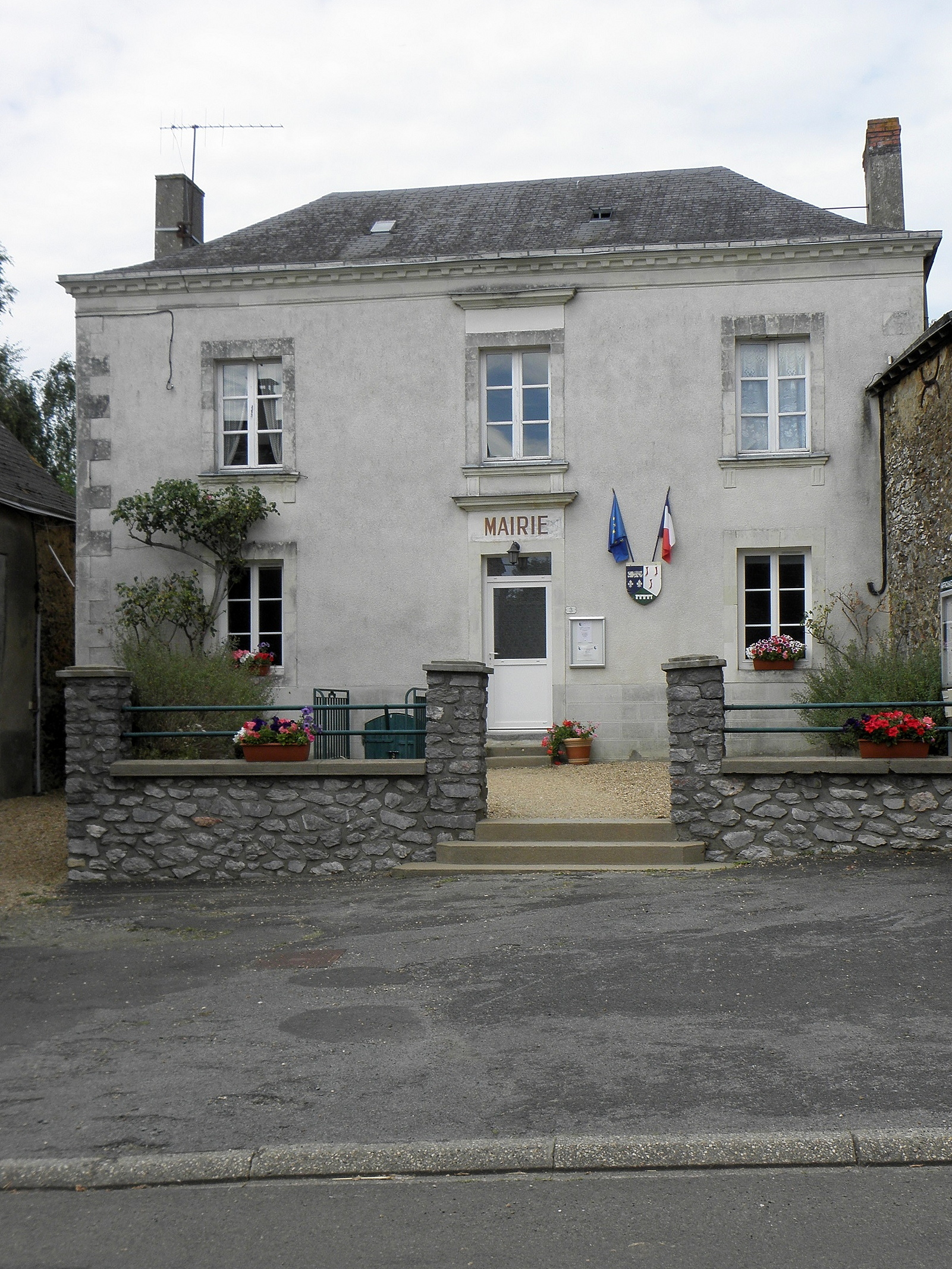
- Town hall

- Coat of arms
- Location of Beaumont-Pied-de-Bœuf
- Location within France Location within Pays de la Loire
- Coordinates: 47°54′17″N 0°25′57″W
- Country: France
- Region: Pays de la Loire
- Department: Mayenne
- Arrondissement: Château-Gontier
- Canton: Meslay-du-Maine

Government
  - Mayor (2020–2026): Eric Seurin
- Area^{1}: 13.31 km^{2} (5.14 sq mi)
- Elevation: 75 m (246 ft)
- Highest elevation: 89 m (292 ft)
- Lowest elevation: 38 m (125 ft)
- Population (2023): 203
  - Density: 15.3/km^{2} (39.5/sq mi)
- Time zone: UTC+01:00 (CET)
  - Summer (DST): UTC+02:00 (CEST)
- INSEE/Postal code: 53027 /53290
- ^{1} French Land Register data, which excludes lakes, ponds, glaciers > 1 km^{2} (0.386 sq mi or 247 acres) and river estuaries.

Beaumont-Pied-de-Bœuf (French pronunciation: [bomɔ̃ pje də bœf]) is a commune in the Mayenne department in northwestern France.

== Geography ==
The Vaige forms part of the commune's northwestern border, flows southeast through the middle of the commune, and forms part of its southeastern border.

== Population ==
Historical population
Year	Pop.	±% p.a.
1968	240	—
1975	202	−2.43%
1982	180	−1.63%
1990	186	+0.41%
1999	190	+0.24%
2007	197	+0.45%
2012	208	+1.09%
2017	190	−1.79%
2023	203	+1.11%
Source: INSEE

== See also ==
- Communes of Mayenne
