= Sainte-Suzanne, Mayenne =

Sainte-Suzanne
- Part of Sainte-Suzanne-et-Chammes
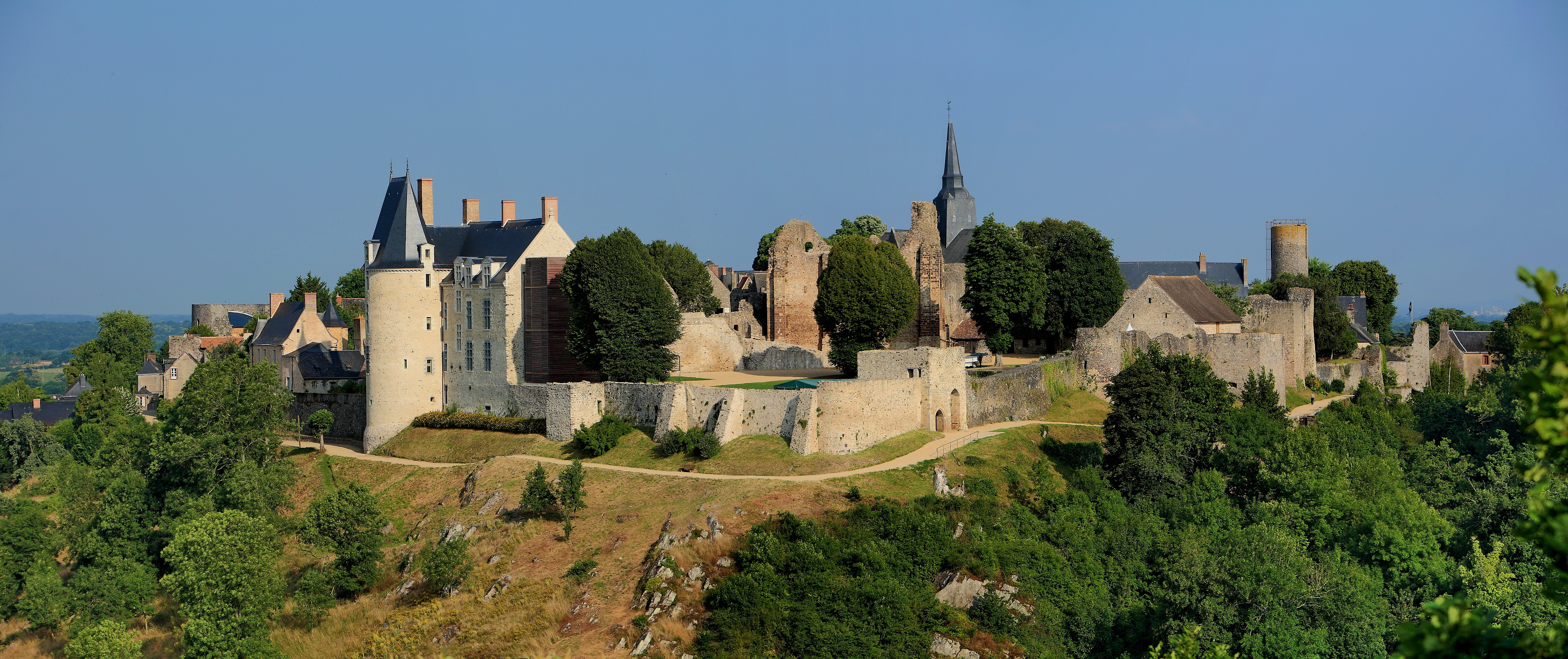
- A view of Sainte-Suzanne, from Tertre Ganne

- Coat of arms
- Location of Sainte-Suzanne
- Location within France Location within Pays de la Loire
- Coordinates: 48°05′54″N 0°21′06″W
- Country: France
- Region: Pays de la Loire
- Department: Mayenne
- Arrondissement: Laval
- Canton: Meslay-du-Maine
- Commune: Sainte-Suzanne-et-Chammes
- Area^{1}: 23.14 km^{2} (8.93 sq mi)
- Elevation: 170 m (560 ft)
- Highest elevation: 220 m (720 ft)
- Lowest elevation: 86 m (282 ft)
- Population (2022): 837
  - Density: 36.2/km^{2} (93.7/sq mi)
- Time zone: UTC+01:00 (CET)
  - Summer (DST): UTC+02:00 (CEST)
- Postal code: 53270
- ^{1} French Land Register data, which excludes lakes, ponds, glaciers > 1 km^{2} (0.386 sq mi or 247 acres) and river estuaries.

Sainte-Suzanne (French pronunciation: [sɛ̃t syzan]) is a former commune in the Mayenne department in north-western France. On 1 January 2016, it was merged into the new commune of Sainte-Suzanne-et-Chammes. It is a member of Les Plus Beaux Villages de France (The Most Beautiful Villages of France) Association. French composer Jean Déré died in Sainte-Suzanne on 6 December 1970.

== See also ==
- Siege of Sainte-Suzanne
- Communes of the Mayenne department
