= Canton of Meslay-du-Maine =

Coordinates: 47.95°N 0.55°W

The canton of Meslay-du-Maine is an administrative division of the Mayenne department, northwestern France. Its borders were modified at the French canton reorganisation which came into effect in March 2015. Its seat is in Meslay-du-Maine.

It consists of the following communes:

1. Arquenay
2. Bannes
3. La Bazouge-de-Chemeré
4. Bazougers
5. Beaumont-Pied-de-Bœuf
6. Le Bignon-du-Maine
7. Blandouet-Saint Jean
8. Bouère
9. Bouessay
10. Le Buret
11. La Chapelle-Rainsouin
12. Chémeré-le-Roi
13. Cossé-en-Champagne
14. La Cropte
15. Grez-en-Bouère
16. Maisoncelles-du-Maine
17. Meslay-du-Maine
18. Préaux
19. Ruillé-Froid-Fonds
20. Saint-Brice
21. Saint-Charles-la-Forêt
22. Saint-Denis-du-Maine
23. Sainte-Suzanne-et-Chammes
24. Saint-Georges-le-Fléchard
25. Saint-Léger
26. Saint-Loup-du-Dorat
27. Saint-Pierre-sur-Erve
28. Saulges
29. Thorigné-en-Charnie
30. Torcé-Viviers-en-Charnie
31. Vaiges
32. Val-du-Maine
33. Villiers-Charlemagne
