= Mée, Mayenne =

Mée
- Commune
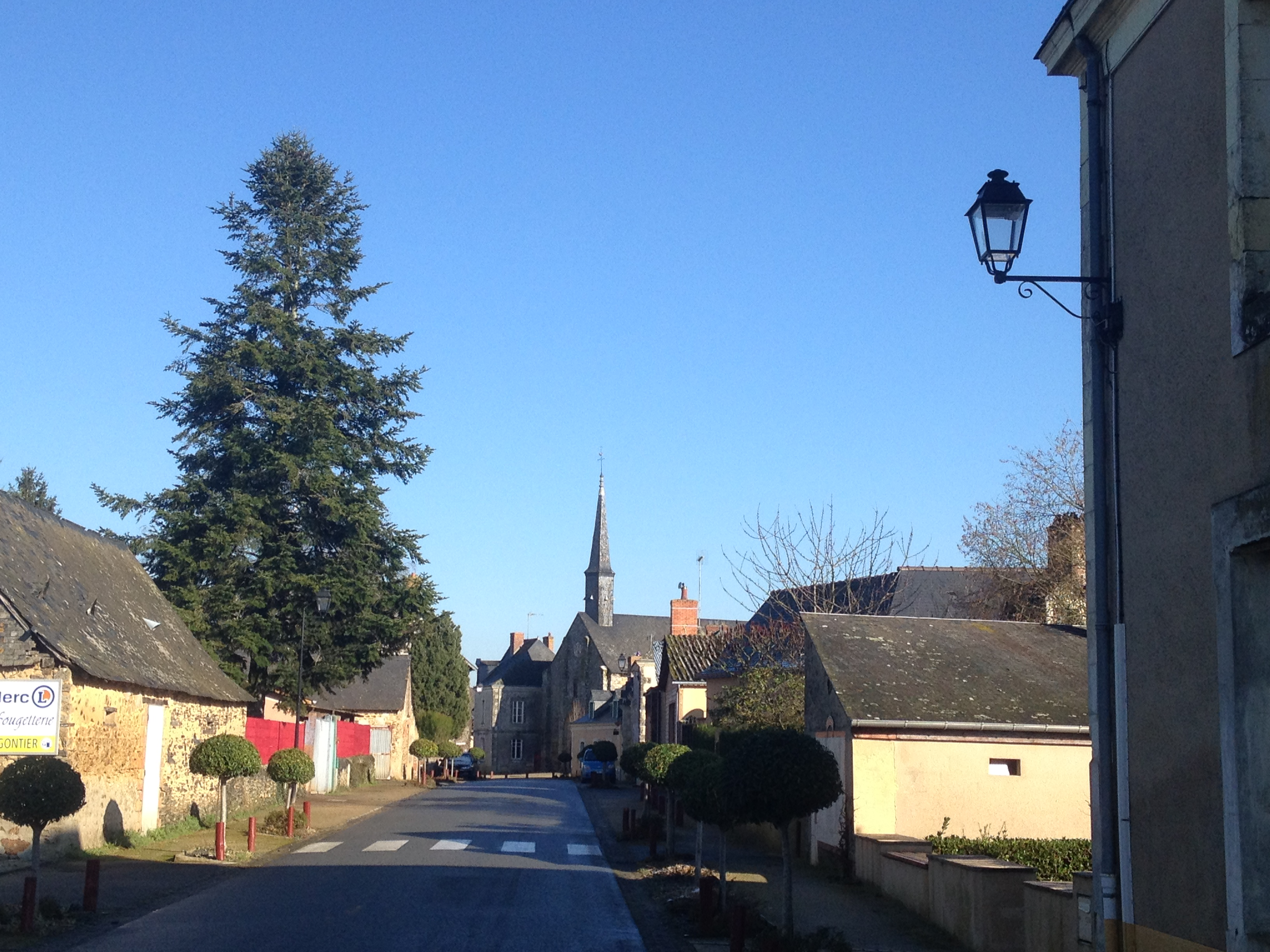
- The road into Mée, from Saint-Quentin-les-Anges
- Location of Mée
- Location within France Location within Pays de la Loire
- Coordinates: 47°47′53″N 0°51′34″W
- Country: France
- Region: Pays de la Loire
- Department: Mayenne
- Arrondissement: Château-Gontier
- Canton: Château-Gontier-sur-Mayenne-2

Government
  - Mayor (2020–2026): Alain Bahier
- Area^{1}: 8.75 km^{2} (3.38 sq mi)
- Elevation: 65 m (213 ft)
- Highest elevation: 81 m (266 ft)
- Lowest elevation: 35 m (115 ft)
- Population (2023): 226
  - Density: 25.8/km^{2} (66.9/sq mi)
- Time zone: UTC+01:00 (CET)
  - Summer (DST): UTC+02:00 (CEST)
- INSEE/Postal code: 53148 /53400
- ^{1} French Land Register data, which excludes lakes, ponds, glaciers > 1 km^{2} (0.386 sq mi or 247 acres) and river estuaries.

Mée (French pronunciation: [me]) is a commune in the Mayenne department in north-western France.

== History ==
Under the Ancien Régime, the town was part of the stronghold of the Angevin barony of Craon, depended on the main senechaussee of Angers and the chosen country of Château-Gontier.

In 1635 was listed on the territory of the municipality a rather mediocre fund, containing 350 arpents in arable land, 165 in pasture, 85 in meadows, 216 in wood, 8 in farms and 214 in "heaths and ungrateful lands."

The main resource of the town was for a long time only the chestnut trees. There were 54 farms in Méé in 1853.

== See also ==
- Communes of Mayenne
