= Bierné =

Commune in Mayenne, France

- Part of Bierné-les-Villages
- Location of Bierné
- Location within France Location within Pays de la Loire
- Coordinates: 47°48′41″N 0°32′32″W
- Country: France
- Region: Pays de la Loire
- Department: Mayenne
- Arrondissement: Château-Gontier
- Canton: Azé
- Commune: Bierné-les-Villages
- Area^{1}: 24.15 km^{2} (9.32 sq mi)
- Elevation: 86 m (282 ft)
- Highest elevation: 101 m (331 ft)
- Lowest elevation: 52 m (171 ft)
- Population (2023): 696
  - Density: 28.8/km^{2} (74.6/sq mi)
- Time zone: UTC+01:00 (CET)
  - Summer (DST): UTC+02:00 (CEST)
- Postal code: 53290
- ^{1} French Land Register data, which excludes lakes, ponds, glaciers > 1 km^{2} (0.386 sq mi or 247 acres) and river estuaries.

Bierné (French pronunciation: [bjɛʁne]) is a former commune in the Mayenne department in northwestern France. On 1 January 2019, it was merged into the new commune Bierné-les-Villages.

== See also ==
- Communes of Mayenne
