= Saint-Fort =

- Part of Château-Gontier-sur-Mayenne
- Location of Saint-Fort
- Location within France Location within Pays de la Loire
- Coordinates: 47°47′54″N 0°43′13″W
- Country: France
- Region: Pays de la Loire
- Department: Mayenne
- Arrondissement: Château-Gontier
- Canton: Azé
- Commune: Château-Gontier-sur-Mayenne
- Area^{1}: 10.79 km^{2} (4.17 sq mi)
- Elevation: 74 m (243 ft)
- Highest elevation: 88 m (289 ft)
- Lowest elevation: 22 m (72 ft)
- Population (2022): 1,810
  - Density: 168/km^{2} (434/sq mi)
- Time zone: UTC+01:00 (CET)
  - Summer (DST): UTC+02:00 (CEST)
- Postal code: 53200
- ^{1} French Land Register data, which excludes lakes, ponds, glaciers > 1 km^{2} (0.386 sq mi or 247 acres) and river estuaries.

Saint-Fort (French pronunciation: [sɛ̃ fɔʁ]) is a former commune in the Mayenne department in north-western France. On 1 January 2019, it was merged into the new commune Château-Gontier-sur-Mayenne.

== See also ==
- Communes of the Mayenne department
