= Saint-Laurent-des-Mortiers =

- Part of Bierné-les-Villages
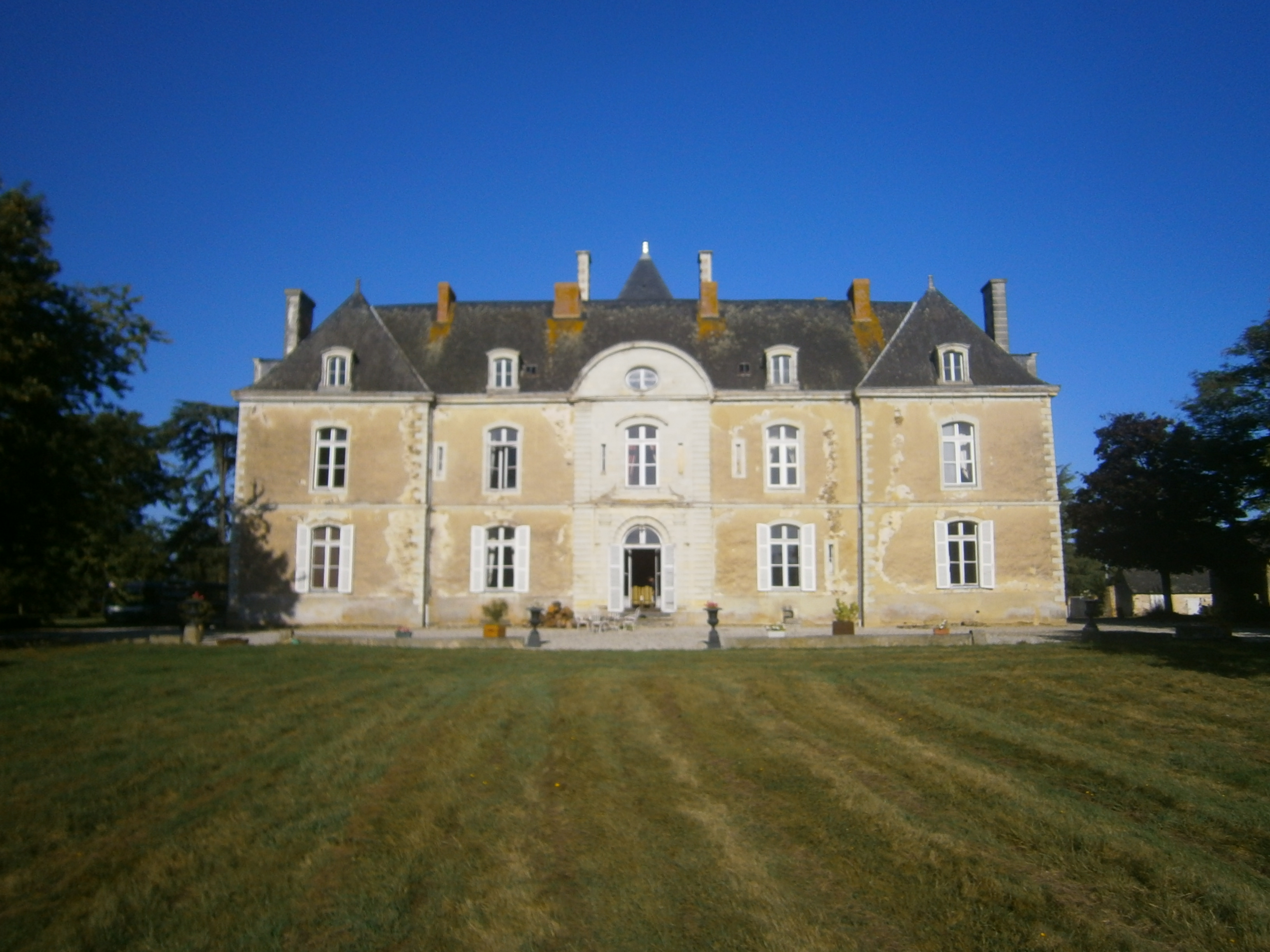
- The Château de Noirieux, in Saint-Laurent-des-Mortiers
- Location of Saint-Laurent-des-Mortiers
- Location within France Location within Pays de la Loire
- Coordinates: 47°46′22″N 0°32′46″E
- Country: France
- Region: Pays de la Loire
- Department: Mayenne
- Arrondissement: Château-Gontier
- Canton: Azé
- Commune: Bierné-les-Villages
- Area^{1}: 10.06 km^{2} (3.88 sq mi)
- Elevation: 80 m (260 ft)
- Highest elevation: 82 m (269 ft)
- Lowest elevation: 41 m (135 ft)
- Population (2022): 184
  - Density: 18.3/km^{2} (47.4/sq mi)
- Time zone: UTC+01:00 (CET)
  - Summer (DST): UTC+02:00 (CEST)
- Postal code: 53290
- ^{1} French Land Register data, which excludes lakes, ponds, glaciers > 1 km^{2} (0.386 sq mi or 247 acres) and river estuaries.

Saint-Laurent-des-Mortiers (French pronunciation: [sɛ̃ loʁɑ̃ de mɔʁtje]) is a former commune in the Mayenne department in north-western France. On 1 January 2019, it was merged into the new commune Bierné-les-Villages.

== See also ==
- Communes of the Mayenne department
