= Longuefuye =

Commune in Mayenne, France

- Part of Gennes-Longuefuye
- Location of Longuefuye
- Location within France Location within Pays de la Loire
- Coordinates: 47°52′03″N 0°36′47″W
- Country: France
- Region: Pays de la Loire
- Department: Mayenne
- Arrondissement: Château-Gontier
- Canton: Azé
- Commune: Gennes-Longuefuye
- Area^{1}: 14.32 km^{2} (5.53 sq mi)
- Elevation: 65 m (213 ft)
- Highest elevation: 116 m (381 ft)
- Lowest elevation: 52 m (171 ft)
- Population (2022): 335
  - Density: 23.4/km^{2} (60.6/sq mi)
- Time zone: UTC+01:00 (CET)
  - Summer (DST): UTC+02:00 (CEST)
- Postal code: 53200
- ^{1} French Land Register data, which excludes lakes, ponds, glaciers > 1 km^{2} (0.386 sq mi or 247 acres) and river estuaries.

Longuefuye (French pronunciation: [lɔ̃ɡfɥi]) is a former commune in the Mayenne department in north-western France. On 1 January 2019, it was merged into the new commune Gennes-Longuefuye.

== See also ==
- Communes of the Mayenne department
