= Loigné-sur-Mayenne =

- Part of La Roche-Neuville
- Location of Loigné-sur-Mayenne
- Location within France Location within Pays de la Loire
- Coordinates: 47°52′24″N 0°44′52″W
- Country: France
- Region: Pays de la Loire
- Department: Mayenne
- Arrondissement: Château-Gontier
- Canton: Azé
- Commune: La Roche-Neuville
- Area^{1}: 20.5 km^{2} (7.9 sq mi)
- Highest elevation: 104 m (341 ft)
- Lowest elevation: 27 m (89 ft)
- Population (2022): 1,000
  - Density: 49/km^{2} (130/sq mi)
- Time zone: UTC+01:00 (CET)
  - Summer (DST): UTC+02:00 (CEST)
- Postal code: 53200
- ^{1} French Land Register data, which excludes lakes, ponds, glaciers > 1 km^{2} (0.386 sq mi or 247 acres) and river estuaries.

Loigné-sur-Mayenne (French pronunciation: [lwaɲe syʁ majɛn], literally Loigné on Mayenne) is a former commune in the Mayenne department in north-western France. On 1 January 2019, it was merged into the new commune La Roche-Neuville.

== See also ==
- Communes of the Mayenne department
