= Arrondissements of the Mayenne department =

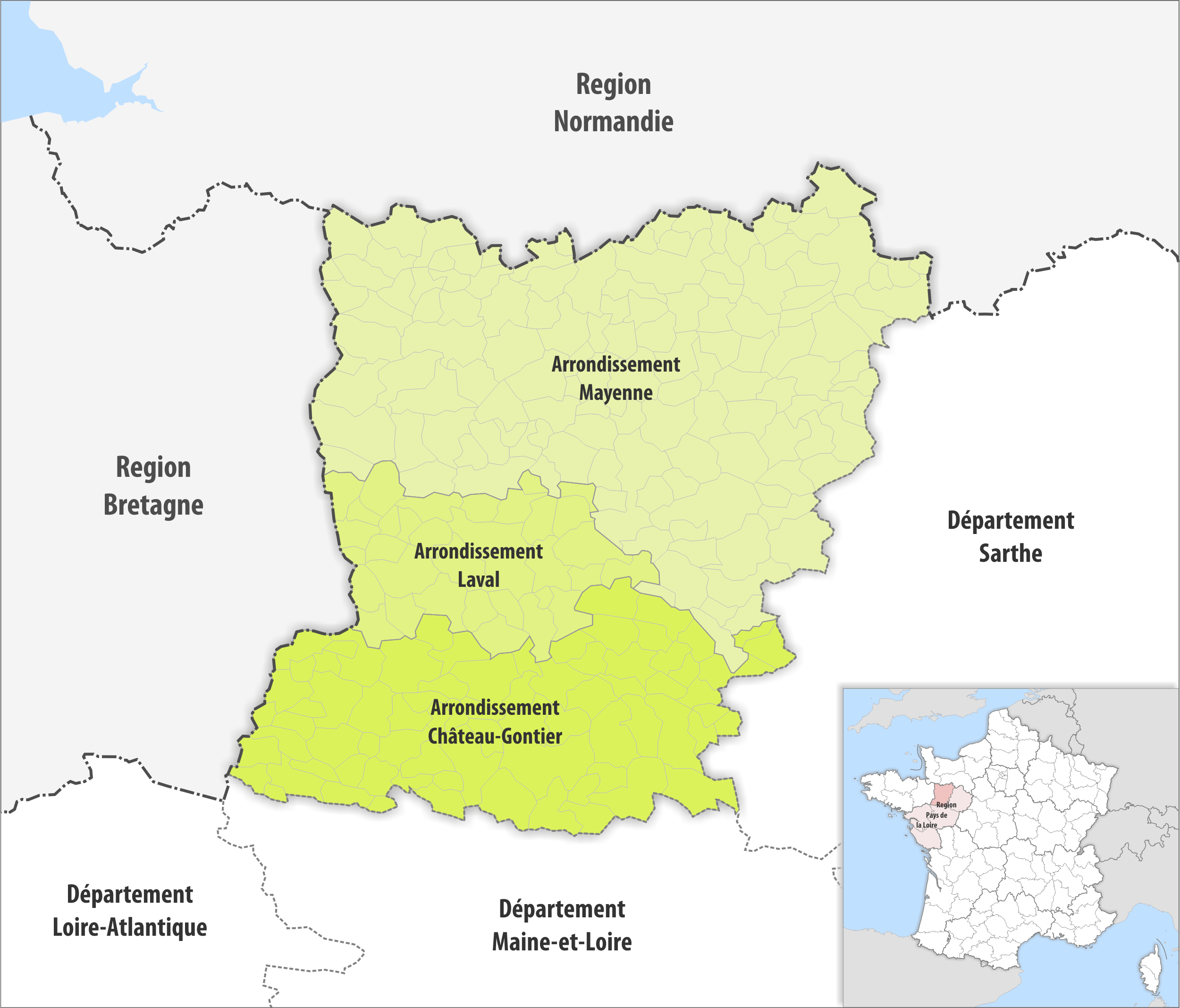
Map of arrondissements of the Mayenne department.

The 3 arrondissements of the Mayenne department are:

1. Arrondissement of Château-Gontier, (subprefecture: Château-Gontier-sur-Mayenne) with 76 communes. The population of the arrondissement was 73,211 in 2021.
2. Arrondissement of Laval, (prefecture of the Mayenne department: Laval) with 34 communes. The population of the arrondissement was 114,674 in 2021.
3. Arrondissement of Mayenne, (subprefecture: Mayenne) with 130 communes. The population of the arrondissement was 118,048 in 2021.

== History ==
In 1800 the arrondissements of Laval, Château-Gontier and Mayenne were established. The arrondissement of Château-Gontier was disbanded in 1926, and restored in 1942. On 1 January 2019, the commune of Château-Gontier was merged into the new commune of Château-Gontier-sur-Mayenne, which became the subprefecture for the Arrondissement of Château-Gontier.

The borders of the arrondissements of Mayenne were modified in March 2016:

- 14 communes from the arrondissement of Laval to the arrondissement of Château-Gontier
- 38 communes from the arrondissement of Laval to the arrondissement of Mayenne
