= Gennes-sur-Glaize =

- Part of Gennes-Longuefuye
- Location of Gennes-sur-Glaize
- Location within France Location within Pays de la Loire
- Coordinates: 47°51′17″N 0°36′26″W
- Country: France
- Region: Pays de la Loire
- Department: Mayenne
- Arrondissement: Château-Gontier
- Canton: Azé
- Commune: Gennes-Longuefuye
- Area^{1}: 25.97 km^{2} (10.03 sq mi)
- Elevation: 68 m (223 ft)
- Highest elevation: 98 m (322 ft)
- Lowest elevation: 53 m (174 ft)
- Population (2022): 1,016
  - Density: 39.12/km^{2} (101.3/sq mi)
- Time zone: UTC+01:00 (CET)
  - Summer (DST): UTC+02:00 (CEST)
- Postal code: 53200
- ^{1} French Land Register data, which excludes lakes, ponds, glaciers > 1 km^{2} (0.386 sq mi or 247 acres) and river estuaries.

Gennes-sur-Glaize (French pronunciation: [ʒɛn syʁ ɡlɛz]) is a former commune in the Mayenne department in north-western France. On 1 January 2019, it was merged into the new commune Gennes-Longuefuye.

== See also ==
- Communes of the Mayenne department
