= Saint-Michel-de-Feins =

- Part of Bierné-les-Villages
- Location of Saint-Michel-de-Feins
- Location within France Location within Pays de la Loire
- Coordinates: 47°46′41″N 0°34′05″W
- Country: France
- Region: Pays de la Loire
- Department: Mayenne
- Arrondissement: Château-Gontier
- Canton: Azé
- Commune: Bierné-les-Villages
- Area^{1}: 6.75 km^{2} (2.61 sq mi)
- Elevation: 80 m (260 ft)
- Highest elevation: 86 m (282 ft)
- Lowest elevation: 50 m (160 ft)
- Population (2022): 182
  - Density: 27.0/km^{2} (69.8/sq mi)
- Time zone: UTC+01:00 (CET)
  - Summer (DST): UTC+02:00 (CEST)
- Postal code: 53290
- ^{1} French Land Register data, which excludes lakes, ponds, glaciers > 1 km^{2} (0.386 sq mi or 247 acres) and river estuaries.

Saint-Michel-de-Feins (French pronunciation: [sɛ̃ miʃɛl də fɛ̃]) is a former commune in the Mayenne department in north-western France. On 1 January 2019, it was merged into the new commune Bierné-les-Villages.

== See also ==
- Communes of the Mayenne department
