= Argenton-Notre-Dame =

- Part of Bierné-les-Villages
- Location of Argenton-Notre-Dame
- Location within France Location within Pays de la Loire
- Coordinates: 47°46′51″N 0°35′16″W
- Country: France
- Region: Pays de la Loire
- Department: Mayenne
- Arrondissement: Château-Gontier
- Canton: Azé
- Commune: Bierné-les-Villages
- Area^{1}: 6.77 km^{2} (2.61 sq mi)
- Elevation: 60 m (200 ft)
- Highest elevation: 82 m (269 ft)
- Lowest elevation: 33 m (108 ft)
- Population (2023): 221
  - Density: 32.6/km^{2} (84.5/sq mi)
- Time zone: UTC+01:00 (CET)
  - Summer (DST): UTC+02:00 (CEST)
- Postal code: 53290
- ^{1} French Land Register data, which excludes lakes, ponds, glaciers > 1 km^{2} (0.386 sq mi or 247 acres) and river estuaries.

Argenton-Notre-Dame (French pronunciation: [aʁʒɑ̃tɔ̃ nɔtʁə dam]) is a former commune in the Mayenne department in northwestern France with a population of 215 (2018). On 1 January 2019, it was merged into the new commune Bierné-les-Villages.

== Local culture and heritage ==
- Château de la Fautraise
- Château de la Sionnière

== See also ==
- Communes of Mayenne
