= Bierné-les-Villages =

- Commune
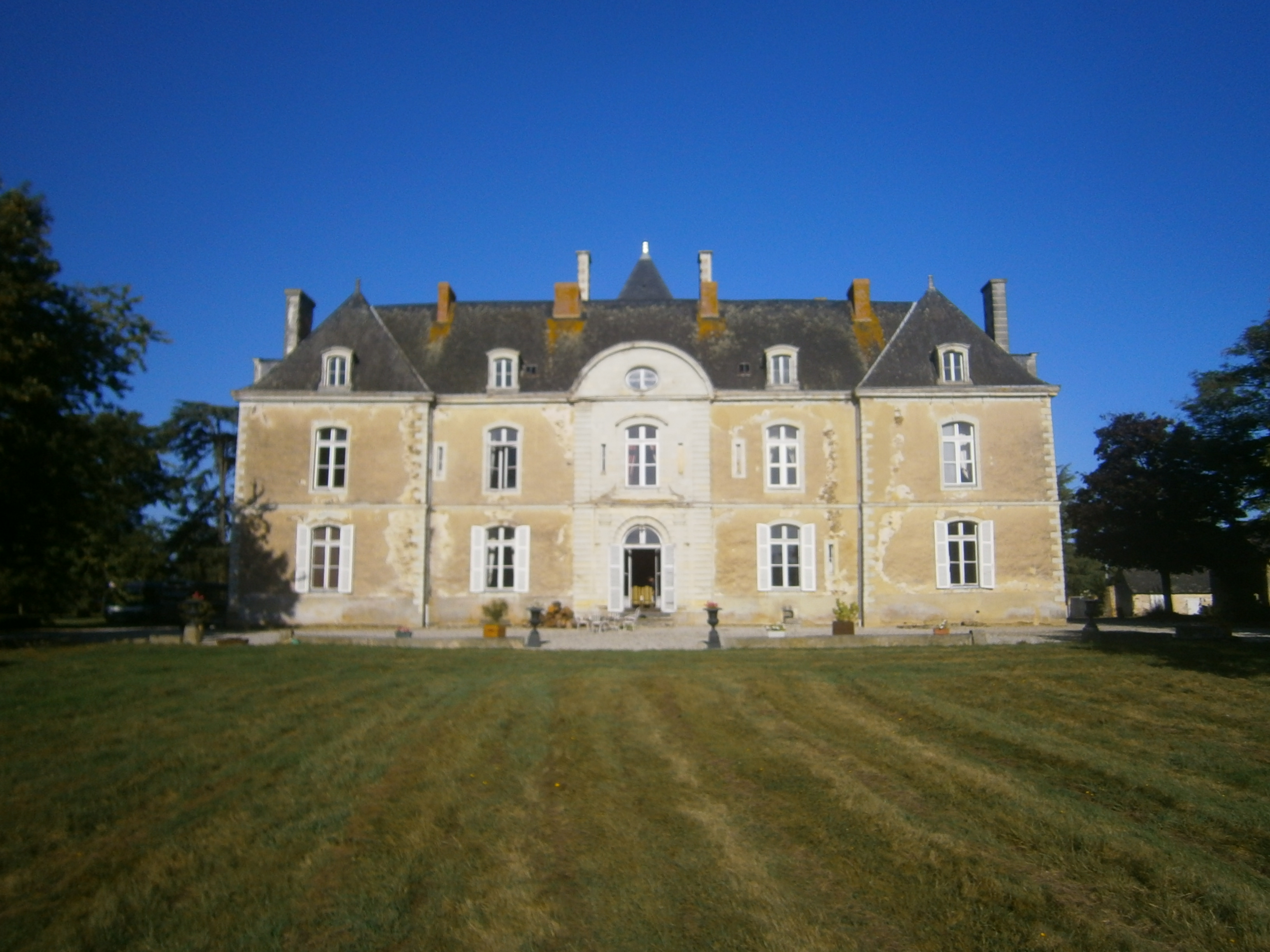
- The Château de Noirieux, in Saint-Laurent-des-Mortiers
- Location of Bierné-les-Villages
- Location within France Location within Pays de la Loire
- Coordinates: 47°48′41″N 0°32′32″W
- Country: France
- Region: Pays de la Loire
- Department: Mayenne
- Arrondissement: Château-Gontier
- Canton: Château-Gontier-sur-Mayenne-1
- Intercommunality: CC Pays de Château-Gontier

Government
  - Mayor (2020–2026): Marie-Noëlle Tribondeau
- Area^{1}: 47.73 km^{2} (18.43 sq mi)
- Highest elevation: 101 m (331 ft)
- Lowest elevation: 40 m (130 ft)
- Population (2023): 1,285
  - Density: 26.92/km^{2} (69.73/sq mi)
- Time zone: UTC+01:00 (CET)
  - Summer (DST): UTC+02:00 (CEST)
- INSEE/Postal code: 53029 /53290
- ^{1} French Land Register data, which excludes lakes, ponds, glaciers > 1 km^{2} (0.386 sq mi or 247 acres) and river estuaries.

Bierné-les-Villages (French pronunciation: [bjɛʁne le vilaʒ], literally Bierné the Villages) is a commune in the Mayenne department in northwestern France. It was established on 1 January 2019 by merger of the former communes of Bierné (the seat), Argenton-Notre-Dame, Saint-Laurent-des-Mortiers and Saint-Michel-de-Feins.

== See also ==
- Communes of the Mayenne department
