= Louis-François Allard =

French physician and politician

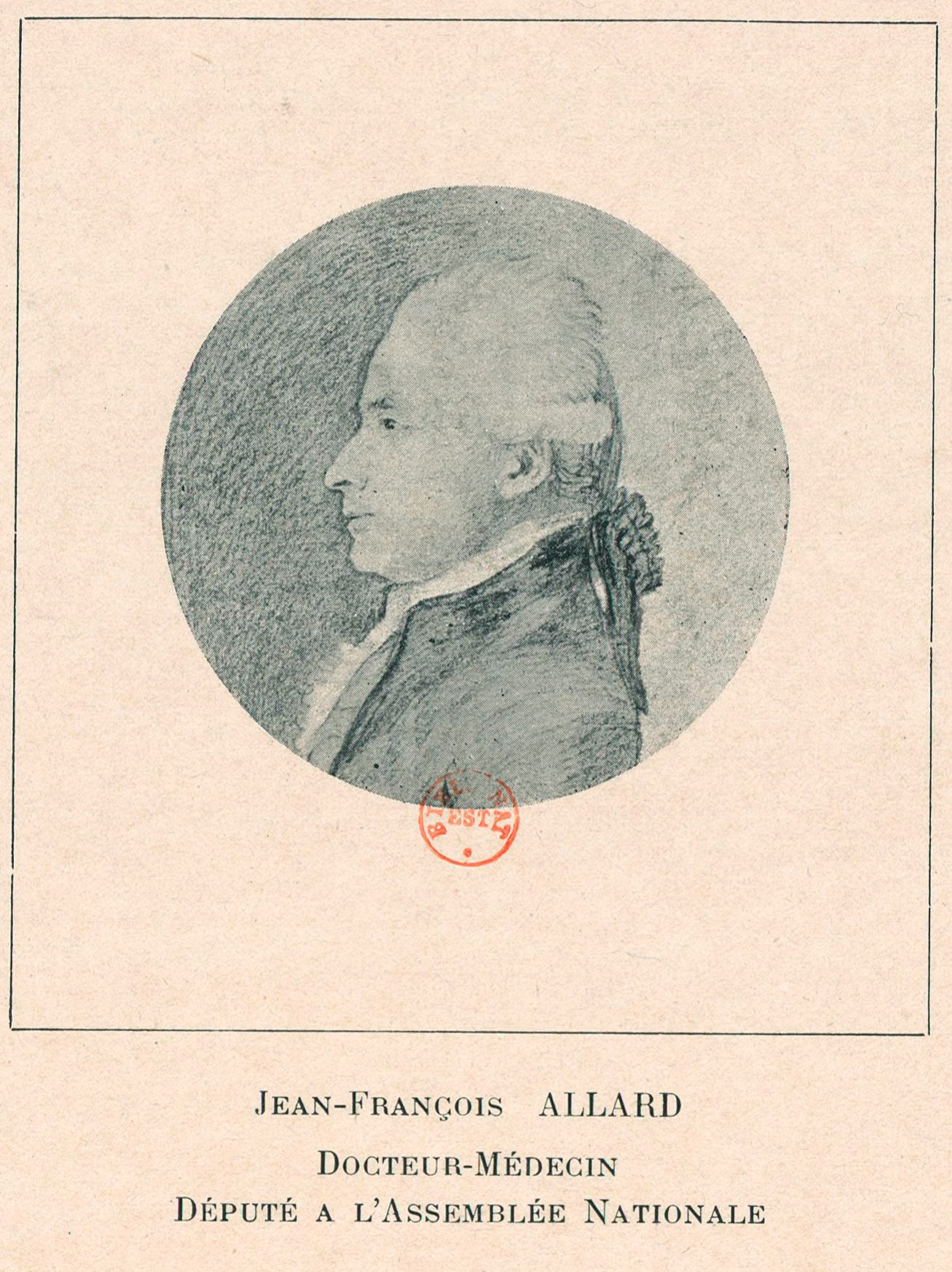
Portrait of Louis-François Allard

Louis-François Allard (17 August 1735 - 30 June 1819) was a French physician and politician.

== First years ==
His father, René Allard, was a merchant and a public figure in Craon: he was convened in 1770 by the Présidial Councillor, as well as master Jacques-René Chassebœuf (father of Volney), lawyer at Craon and former administrator of the hospital, to deliberate on the reforms to the mismanagement of the Hôtel-Dieu de Craon. René Allard married Marthe-Marie Gousset on 10 May 1734 and she gave him a son who received the names of Louis François.

He became medical doctor in the University of Angers on 19 November 1754. On 22 February 1759 he married Marie-Marguerite Millet. This marriage fixed him in Château-Gontier and he was incorporated into the physicians college of this city.

In 1786, with his colleagues René Theulier and Louis Jousselin, he wrote and sent to the intendant, a memorandum on the status of the city and its ferruginous mineral waters, known as of Baths of Château-Gontier (fr).

== French Revolution ==
He was elected member of Parliament for the Third Estate to the Estates-General of 1789 by the bailiwick of Anjou on 20 March 1789. He went to Paris and lived first in Versailles, pavillon Journé, cul-de-sac of the Hôtel de Limoges then in Paris, (1790 and 1791), cul-de-sac of Coq-Saint-Honoré, hôtel d'Artois.

He signed the Tennis Court Oath on 20 June 1789 and he contributed to the night of 4 August 1789 (fr) (Abolition of feudalism in France).

On 9 July 1789 he was elected to the National Constituent Assembly and became a member of the Committee on Public Health (fr) established on the basis of an initiative of Joseph-Ignace Guillotin and presided over by himself. Allard was a true patriot but liberal: he voted against the Civil Constitution of the Clergy.

== Back to Château-Gontier ==
When the Constituent Assembly stopped in favour of Legislative Assembly (1 October 1791) he took up his first job again in Château-Gontier where he died the 30 June 1819 without political problem.
