= Fromentières =

Fromentières may refer to the following places in France:

- Fromentières, Marne, a commune in the Marne department
- Fromentières, Mayenne, a commune in the Mayenne department
