= Houssay =

Houssay may refer to:

- Bernardo Houssay (1887–1971), Argentine physiologist and Nobel Prize winner
- Houssay, Loir-et-Cher, a commune in the Loir-et-Cher department, France
- Houssay, Mayenne, a commune in the Mayenne department, France
- Houssay (crater), a lunar impact crater located on the lunar far side near the northern pole
- Bernardo Houssay Award, an Argentine Ministry of Science honor
