= Azé =

Azé is the name of the following communes in France:

- Azé, Loir-et-Cher, in the Loir-et-Cher department
- Azé, Saône-et-Loire, in the Saône-et-Loire department
- Azé, Mayenne, former commune in the Mayenne department

== See also ==
- Aze (disambiguation)
- Azay (disambiguation)
