= Gennes-Longuefuye =

- Commune
- Location of Gennes-Longuefuye
- Location within France Location within Pays de la Loire
- Coordinates: 47°51′17″N 0°36′26″W
- Country: France
- Region: Pays de la Loire
- Department: Mayenne
- Arrondissement: Château-Gontier
- Canton: Château-Gontier-sur-Mayenne-1

Government
  - Mayor (2020–2026): Michel Giraud
- Area^{1}: 40.29 km^{2} (15.56 sq mi)
- Highest elevation: 116 m (381 ft)
- Lowest elevation: 52 m (171 ft)
- Population (2023): 1,354
  - Density: 33.61/km^{2} (87.04/sq mi)
- Time zone: UTC+01:00 (CET)
  - Summer (DST): UTC+02:00 (CEST)
- INSEE/Postal code: 53104 /53200
- ^{1} French Land Register data, which excludes lakes, ponds, glaciers > 1 km^{2} (0.386 sq mi or 247 acres) and river estuaries.

Gennes-Longuefuye (French pronunciation: [ʒɛn lɔ̃ɡfɥi]) is a commune in the Mayenne department in north-western France. It was established on 1 January 2019 by merger of the former communes of Gennes-sur-Glaize (the seat) and Longuefuye.

== See also ==
- Communes of the Mayenne department
