= Denazé =

- Commune
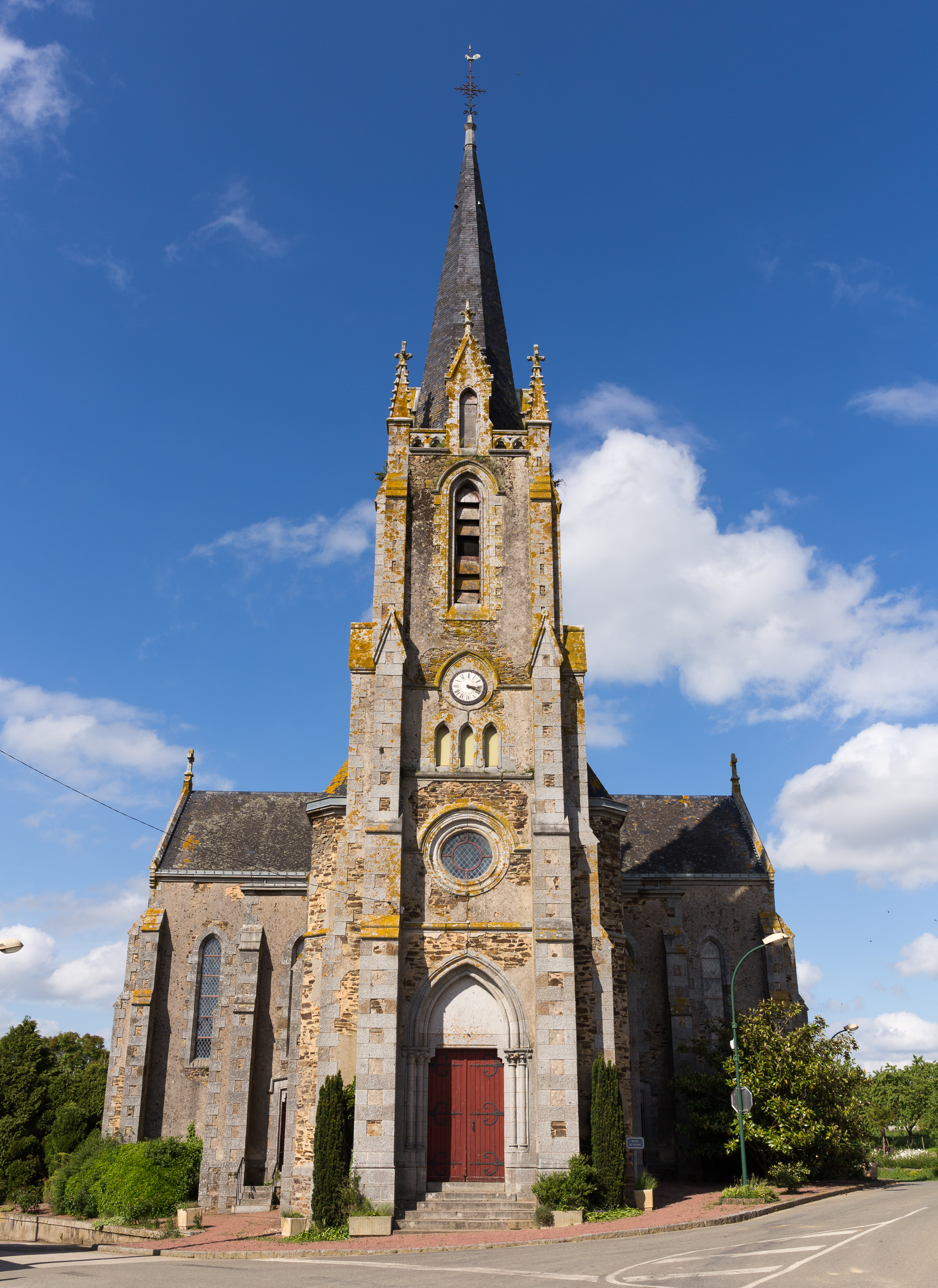
- Location of Denazé
- Location within France Location within Pays de la Loire
- Coordinates: 47°53′09″N 0°53′09″W
- Country: France
- Region: Pays de la Loire
- Department: Mayenne
- Arrondissement: Château-Gontier
- Canton: Château-Gontier-sur-Mayenne-2
- Intercommunality: CC du Pays de Craon

Government
  - Mayor (2020–2026): Odile Gohier
- Area^{1}: 9.3 km^{2} (3.6 sq mi)
- Elevation: 150 m (490 ft)
- Highest elevation: 104 m (341 ft)
- Lowest elevation: 52 m (171 ft)
- Population (2023): 194
  - Density: 21/km^{2} (54/sq mi)
- Time zone: UTC+01:00 (CET)
  - Summer (DST): UTC+02:00 (CEST)
- INSEE/Postal code: 53090 /53400
- ^{1} French Land Register data, which excludes lakes, ponds, glaciers > 1 km^{2} (0.386 sq mi or 247 acres) and river estuaries.

Denazé (French pronunciation: [dənaze]) is a commune in the Mayenne department in north-western France.

== See also ==
- Communes of the Mayenne department
