= Daon, Mayenne =

Daon
- Commune
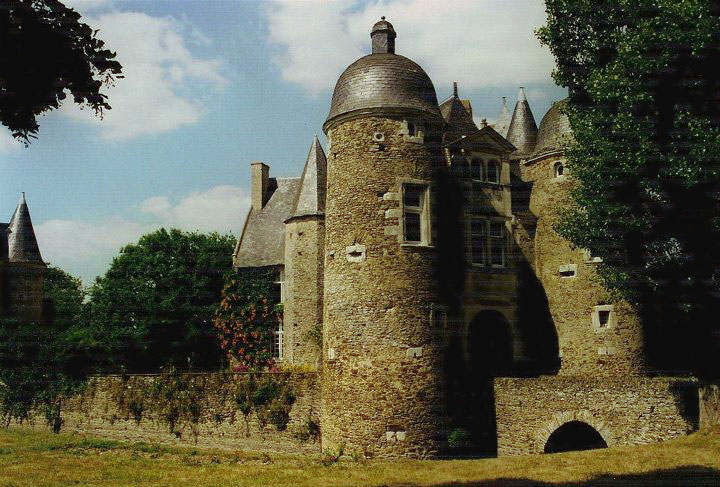
- The Château de l'Escoublère, in Daon

- Coat of arms
- Location of Daon
- Location within France Location within Pays de la Loire
- Coordinates: 47°45′03″N 0°38′15″W
- Country: France
- Region: Pays de la Loire
- Department: Mayenne
- Arrondissement: Château-Gontier
- Canton: Château-Gontier-sur-Mayenne-1

Government
  - Mayor (2021–2026): Catherine Delarue
- Area^{1}: 17.93 km^{2} (6.92 sq mi)
- Elevation: 73 m (240 ft)
- Highest elevation: 81 m (266 ft)
- Lowest elevation: 19 m (62 ft)
- Population (2023): 543
  - Density: 30.3/km^{2} (78.4/sq mi)
- Time zone: UTC+01:00 (CET)
  - Summer (DST): UTC+02:00 (CEST)
- INSEE/Postal code: 53089 /53200
- ^{1} French Land Register data, which excludes lakes, ponds, glaciers > 1 km^{2} (0.386 sq mi or 247 acres) and river estuaries.

Daon is a commune in the Mayenne department in north-western France.

== Sights ==
- Saint-Germain Church, under renovation in 2012.
- The Logis de la Grande Jaillerie.
- Le Logis du Petit Marigné, listed as a historical monument since 1997.

=== Castles ===
Daon is the commune of the Pays de Château-Gontier containing the most of castles, with around ten of these on its territory:

- The Castle of l'Escoublère, 16th century, listed as a historical monument since 1927.
- Mortreux Castle, listed as a historical monument since 1933.
- The Castle Places.
- Lutz Castle.
- Castle of the Porte.
- Bréon Castle.
- Nouairie Castle.
- Touche-Belin Castle.
- Bellevue Castle, known as Villa Bellevue.
- Beaumont Castle.

== See also ==
- Communes of the Mayenne department
