= La Roche-Neuville =

- Commune
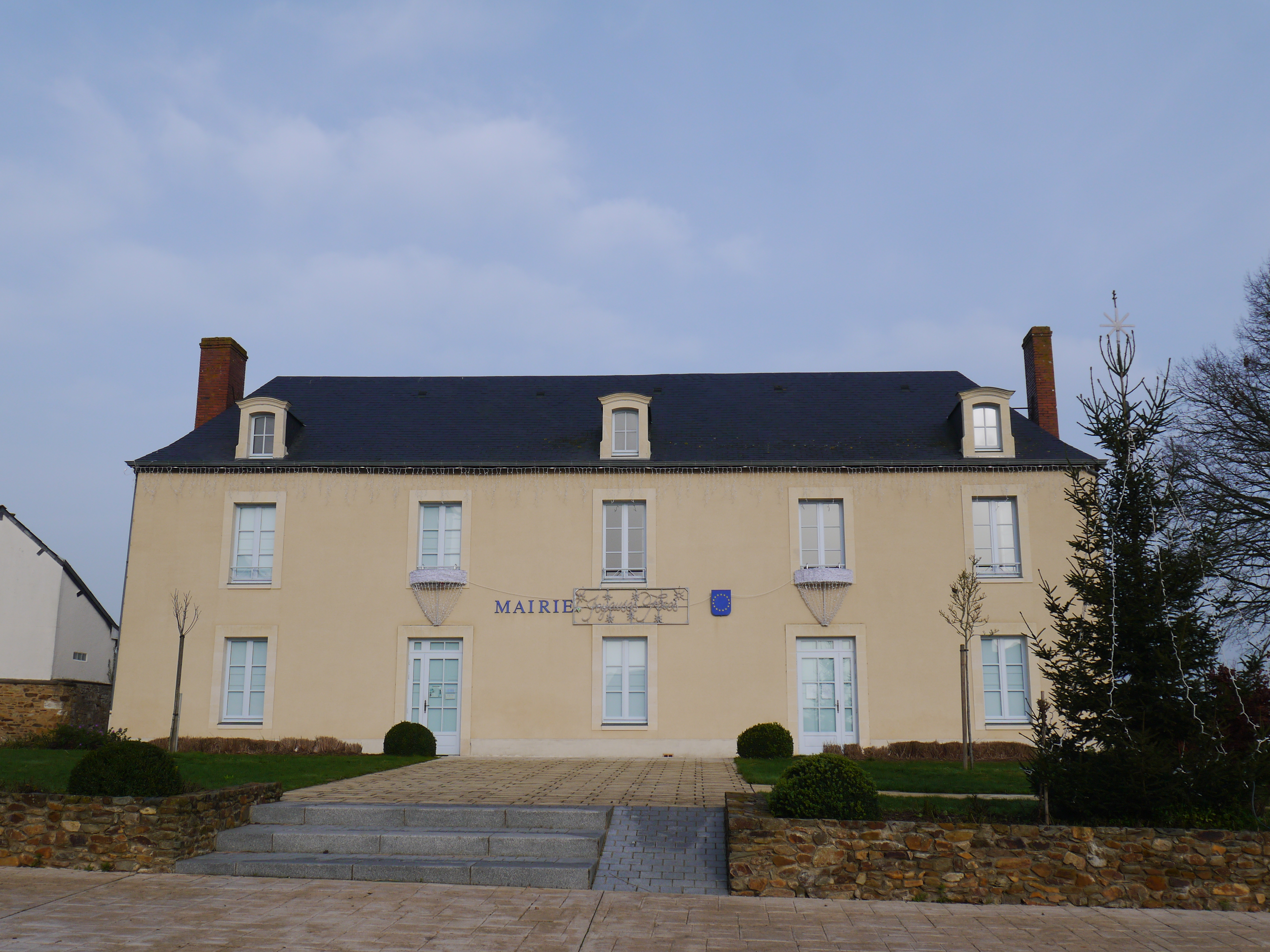
- La Roche-Neuville Town hall
- Location of La Roche-Neuville
- Location within France Location within Pays de la Loire
- Coordinates: 47°52′24″N 0°44′52″W
- Country: France
- Region: Pays de la Loire
- Department: Mayenne
- Arrondissement: Château-Gontier
- Canton: Château-Gontier-sur-Mayenne-1
- Area^{1}: 28.67 km^{2} (11.07 sq mi)
- Highest elevation: 104 m (341 ft)
- Lowest elevation: 27 m (89 ft)
- Population (2023): 1,240
  - Density: 43.3/km^{2} (112/sq mi)
- Time zone: UTC+01:00 (CET)
  - Summer (DST): UTC+02:00 (CEST)
- INSEE/Postal code: 53136 /53200
- ^{1} French Land Register data, which excludes lakes, ponds, glaciers > 1 km^{2} (0.386 sq mi or 247 acres) and river estuaries.

La Roche-Neuville (French pronunciation: [la ʁɔʃ nøvil]) is a commune in the Mayenne department in north-western France. It was established on 1 January 2019 by merger of the former communes of Loigné-sur-Mayenne (the seat) and Saint-Sulpice.

== See also ==
- Communes of the Mayenne department
