= Azé, Mayenne =

Azé
- Part of Château-Gontier-sur-Mayenne
- Location of Azé
- Location within France Location within Pays de la Loire
- Coordinates: 47°49′20″N 0°41′02″W
- Country: France
- Region: Pays de la Loire
- Department: Mayenne
- Arrondissement: Château-Gontier
- Canton: Azé
- Commune: Château-Gontier-sur-Mayenne
- Area^{1}: 29.82 km^{2} (11.51 sq mi)
- Elevation: 58 m (190 ft)
- Highest elevation: 87 m (285 ft)
- Lowest elevation: 22 m (72 ft)
- Population (2022): 3,307
  - Density: 110.9/km^{2} (287.2/sq mi)
- Time zone: UTC+01:00 (CET)
  - Summer (DST): UTC+02:00 (CEST)
- Postal code: 53200
- ^{1} French Land Register data, which excludes lakes, ponds, glaciers > 1 km^{2} (0.386 sq mi or 247 acres) and river estuaries.

Azé (French pronunciation: [aze]) is a former commune in the Mayenne department in northwestern France. On 1 January 2019, it was merged into the new commune Château-Gontier-sur-Mayenne.

== Population ==
Historical population
Year	Pop.	±% p.a.
1962	1,044	—
1968	1,099	+0.86%
1975	1,357	+3.06%
1982	1,999	+5.69%
1990	2,665	+3.66%
1999	2,999	+1.32%
2013	3,284	+0.65%
2022	3,307	+0.08%
Source: EHESS and INSEE

== See also ==
- Communes of Mayenne
