= Chemazé =

- Commune
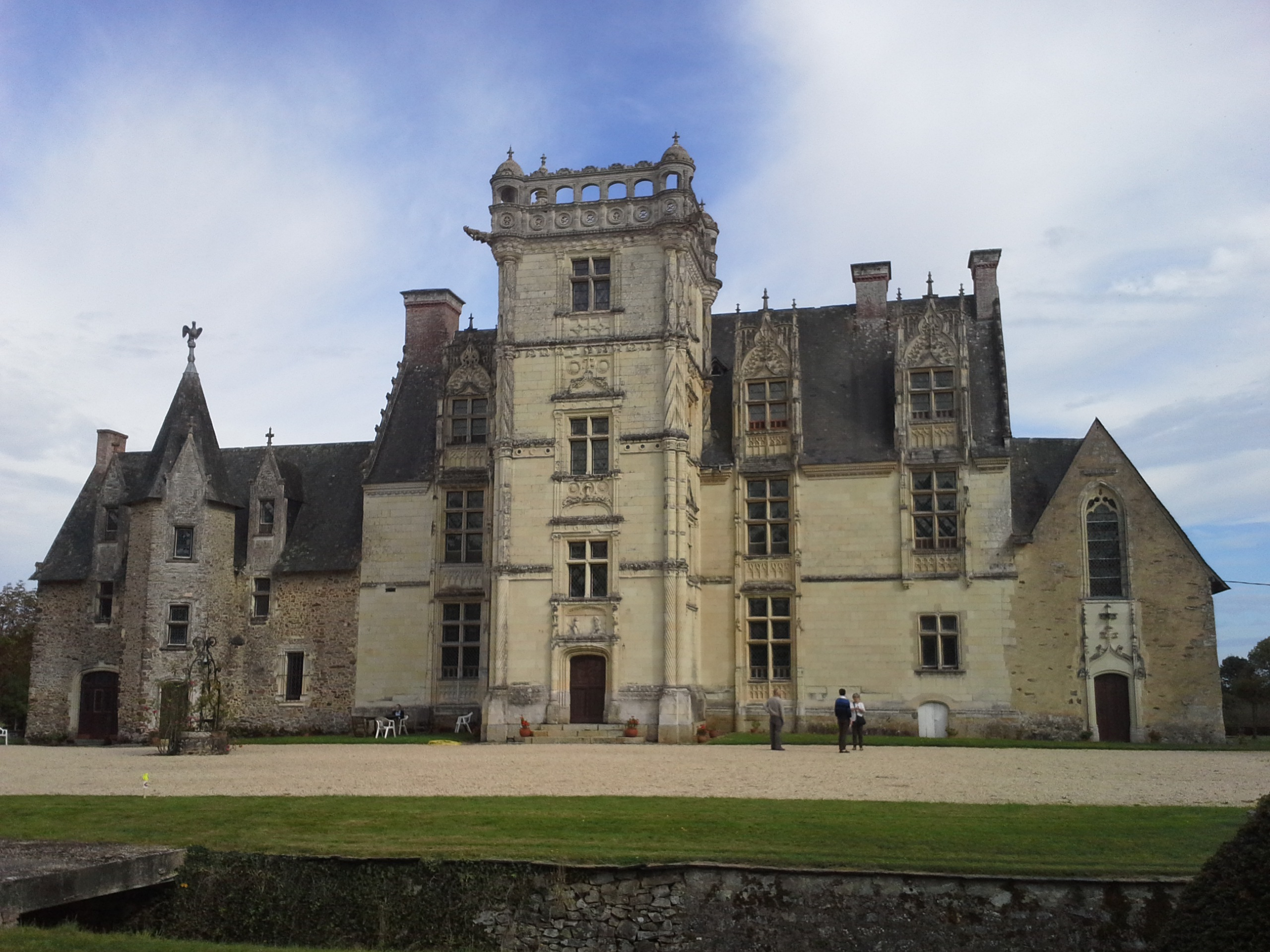
- The Château de Saint-Ouen, in Chamazé
- Location of Chemazé
- Location within France Location within Pays de la Loire
- Coordinates: 47°47′17″N 0°46′25″W
- Country: France
- Region: Pays de la Loire
- Department: Mayenne
- Arrondissement: Château-Gontier
- Canton: Château-Gontier-sur-Mayenne-1

Government
  - Mayor (2021–2026): Caroline Fouilleux
- Area^{1}: 38.54 km^{2} (14.88 sq mi)
- Elevation: 87 m (285 ft)
- Highest elevation: 91 m (299 ft)
- Lowest elevation: 38 m (125 ft)
- Population (2023): 1,352
  - Density: 35.08/km^{2} (90.86/sq mi)
- Time zone: UTC+01:00 (CET)
  - Summer (DST): UTC+02:00 (CEST)
- INSEE/Postal code: 53066 /53200
- ^{1} French Land Register data, which excludes lakes, ponds, glaciers > 1 km^{2} (0.386 sq mi or 247 acres) and river estuaries.

Chemazé (French pronunciation: [ʃəmaze]) is a commune in the Mayenne department in north-western France.

== Notable people ==
- Landry Chauvin, football player and manager, born 1968 in Chemazé

== See also ==
- Communes of the Mayenne department
