= Houssay, Mayenne =

Houssay
- Commune
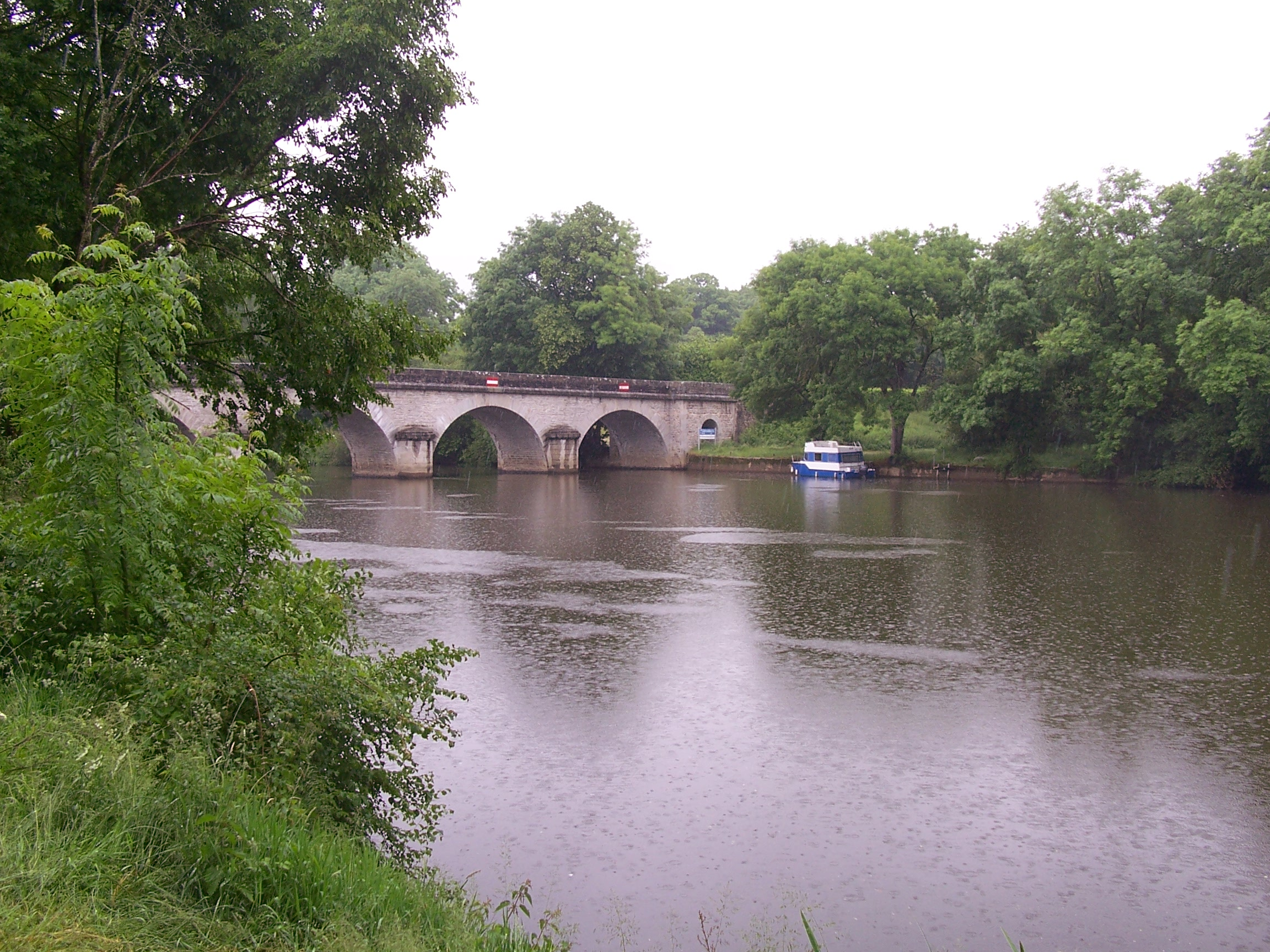
- The Mayenne river at Houssay
- Location of Houssay
- Location within France Location within Pays de la Loire
- Coordinates: 47°54′54″N 0°44′05″W
- Country: France
- Region: Pays de la Loire
- Department: Mayenne
- Arrondissement: Château-Gontier
- Canton: Château-Gontier-sur-Mayenne-1

Government
  - Mayor (2020–2026): Jean-Marie Gigan
- Area^{1}: 14.26 km^{2} (5.51 sq mi)
- Elevation: 100 m (330 ft)
- Highest elevation: 107 m (351 ft)
- Lowest elevation: 32 m (105 ft)
- Population (2023): 493
  - Density: 34.6/km^{2} (89.5/sq mi)
- Time zone: UTC+01:00 (CET)
  - Summer (DST): UTC+02:00 (CEST)
- INSEE/Postal code: 53117 /53360
- ^{1} French Land Register data, which excludes lakes, ponds, glaciers > 1 km^{2} (0.386 sq mi or 247 acres) and river estuaries.

Houssay (French pronunciation: [usɛ]) is a commune in the Mayenne department in north-western France.

== See also ==
- Communes of the Mayenne department
