= Fromentières, Mayenne =

Fromentières
- Commune
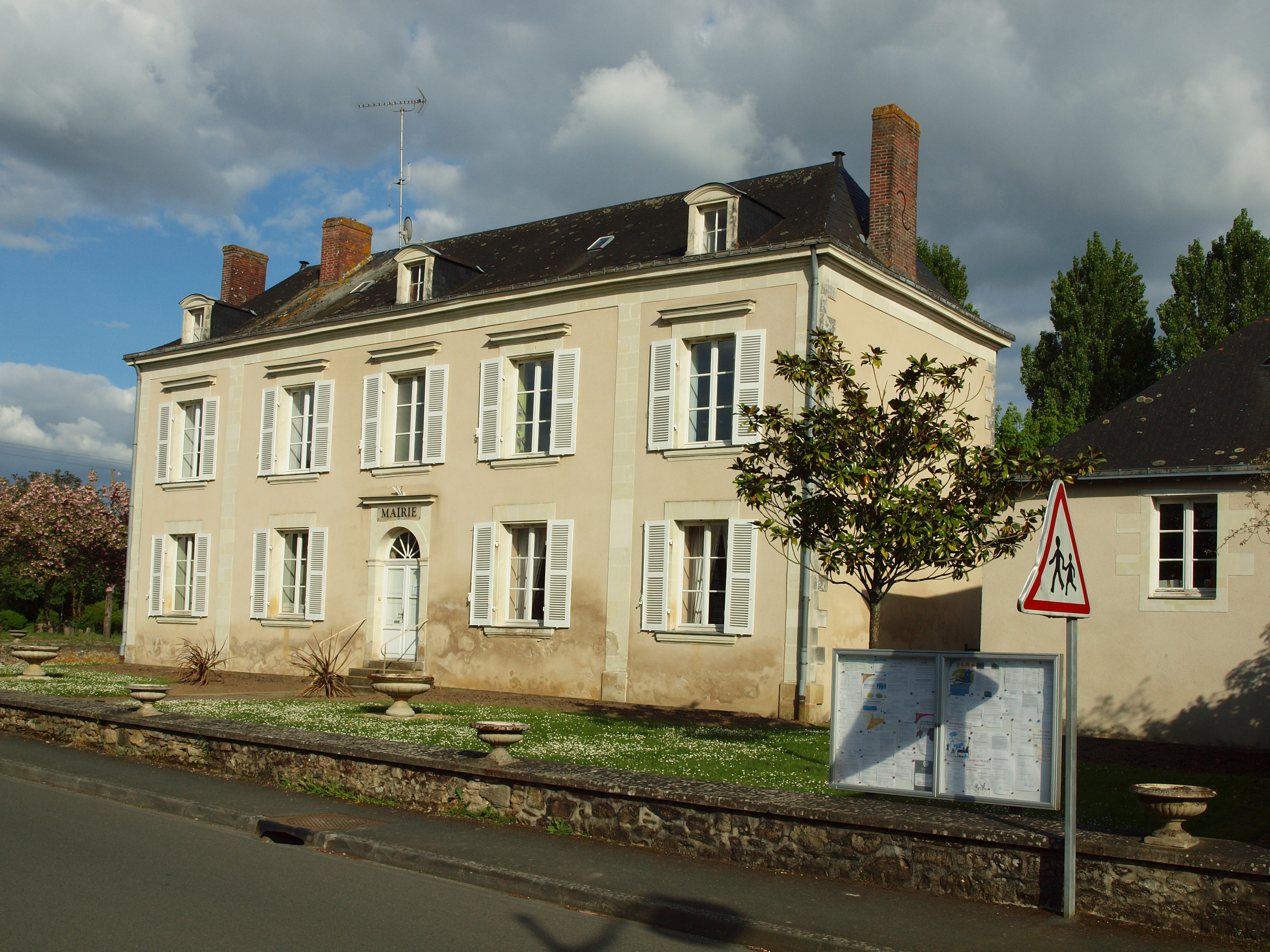
- Town hall
- Location of Fromentières
- Location within France Location within Pays de la Loire
- Coordinates: 47°51′54″N 0°39′50″W
- Country: France
- Region: Pays de la Loire
- Department: Mayenne
- Arrondissement: Château-Gontier
- Canton: Château-Gontier-sur-Mayenne-1

Government
  - Mayor (2020–2026): Christian Livenais
- Area^{1}: 22.06 km^{2} (8.52 sq mi)
- Elevation: 54 m (177 ft)
- Highest elevation: 96 m (315 ft)
- Lowest elevation: 27 m (89 ft)
- Population (2023): 848
  - Density: 38.4/km^{2} (99.6/sq mi)
- Time zone: UTC+01:00 (CET)
  - Summer (DST): UTC+02:00 (CEST)
- INSEE/Postal code: 53101 /53200
- ^{1} French Land Register data, which excludes lakes, ponds, glaciers > 1 km^{2} (0.386 sq mi or 247 acres) and river estuaries.

Fromentières (French pronunciation: [fʁɔmɑ̃tjɛʁ]) is a commune in the Mayenne department in north-western France.

== See also ==
- Communes of the Mayenne department
