= Alexis Roger =

French composer

Alexis-André Roger (11 June 1814 – 1846) was a French composer.

Born in Château-Gontier, in 1828 Roger was admitted to study at the Conservatoire de Paris. He studied harmony with Victor Dourlen, counterpoint with Anton Reicha, piano with Pierre Zimmermann and organ with François Benoist. His composition teachers were Jean-François Lesueur and Ferdinando Paër.

After a commendatory mention in 1838, he won the Premier Grand Prix in 1842 with the cantata La Reine flore in the competition for the Prix de Rome. At the beginning of 1843 he began his two-year stay at the Villa Medici in Rome, which was associated with the prize. This was followed by a trip to Vienna and to Germany, where he died in 1846 at the age of thirty-two.

Only one violin textbook (Grande méthode de violon) which was published in Paris in 1830, has survived of his works.
