= Saint-Quentin-les-Anges =

- Commune
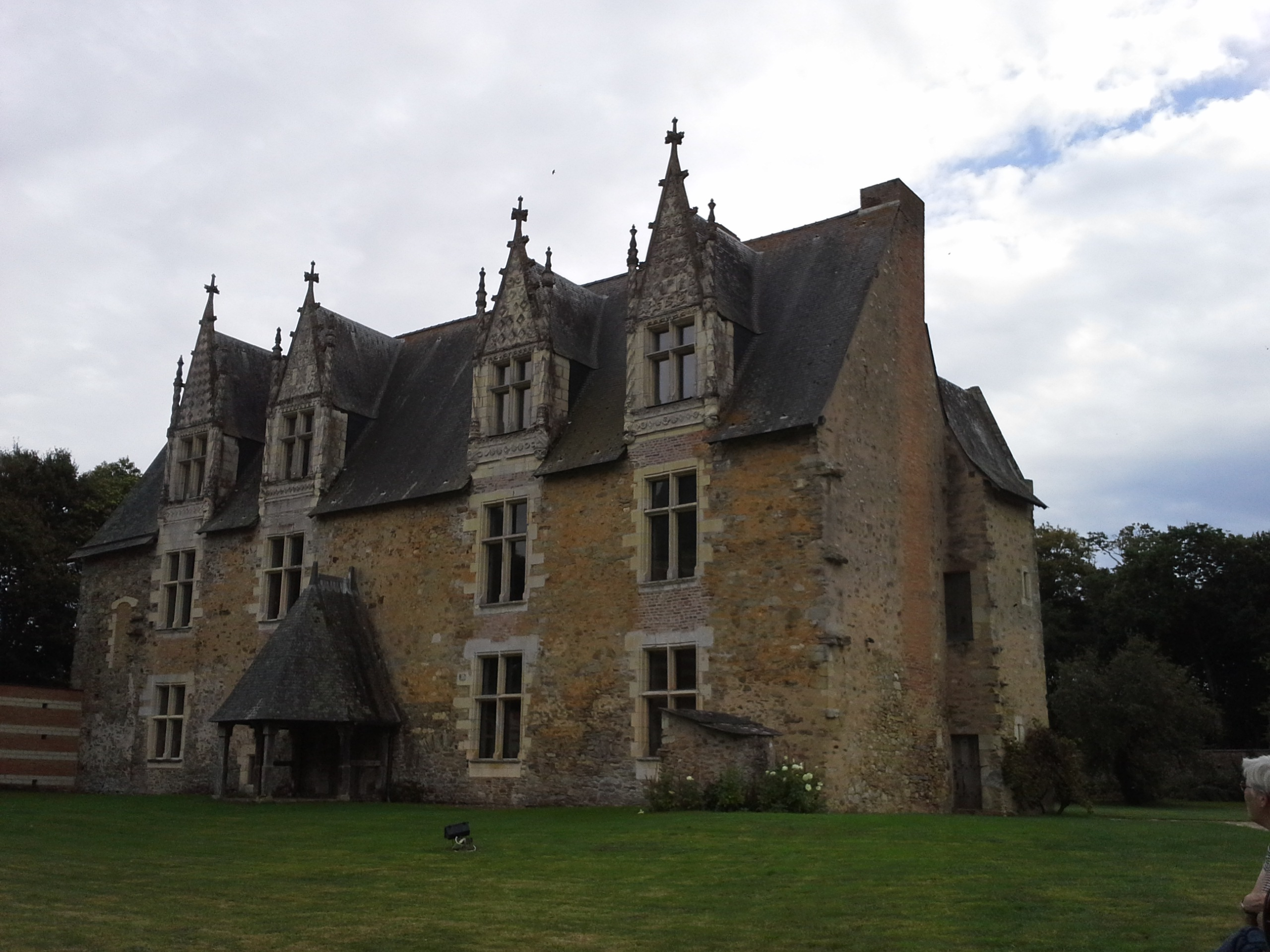
- The Château de Mortiercrolles
- Location of Saint-Quentin-les-Anges
- Location within France Location within Pays de la Loire
- Coordinates: 47°46′27″N 0°53′06″W
- Country: France
- Region: Pays de la Loire
- Department: Mayenne
- Arrondissement: Château-Gontier
- Canton: Château-Gontier-sur-Mayenne-2
- Intercommunality: CC du Pays de Craon

Government
  - Mayor (2020–2026): Dominique Guineheux
- Area^{1}: 17.81 km^{2} (6.88 sq mi)
- Elevation: 53 m (174 ft)
- Highest elevation: 90 m (300 ft)
- Lowest elevation: 32 m (105 ft)
- Population (2023): 472
  - Density: 26.5/km^{2} (68.6/sq mi)
- Time zone: UTC+01:00 (CET)
  - Summer (DST): UTC+02:00 (CEST)
- INSEE/Postal code: 53251 /53400
- ^{1} French Land Register data, which excludes lakes, ponds, glaciers > 1 km^{2} (0.386 sq mi or 247 acres) and river estuaries.

Saint-Quentin-les-Anges (French pronunciation: [sɛ̃ kɑ̃tɛ̃ le.z‿ɑ̃ʒ]) is a commune in the Mayenne department in north-western France.

== See also ==
- Communes of the Mayenne department
