= AZE =

AZE may refer to:

- Alliance for Zero Extinction
- Aze (magazine)
- AZE notation for isotopes: $^A_Z E$ where A is the mass number, Z the atomic number, and E the element's chemical symbol.
- Azerbaijan (ISO 3166-1 alpha-3 and UNDP country code)
- Azerbaijani language (ISO 639 alpha-3, aze)
- German car number plate for Anhalt-Zerbst
- Azetidine-2-carboxylic acid

== See also ==
- Azé (disambiguation)
