= Guy de Charnacé =

French writer, agronomist and musicologist (1825–1909)

- Arms of the Girard family, counts of Charnacé
- Born: 3 May 1825; Château-Gontier, France
- Died: 3 March 1909 (aged 83); Paris
- Occupations: Journalist; Writer; Musicologist; Agronomist
- Awards: Légion d'honneur

Ernest Charles Guy de Girard, count then marquis de Charnacé (3 May 1825 – 3 March 1909) was a French writer, journalist, agronomist and musicologist. In Anjou, he was called the "hero of Bois-Montbourcher".

== Biography ==
Originally from a family in Anjou, his father Charles-Guy (1800-1884) was a senior officer of the Royal Guard who resigned during the July Revolution. Guy de Charnacé studied at the college of Vendôme. In 1843, he left for Dresden. He took a taste for music and attended the premieres of the first lyrical works by Richard Wagner who he did not cease fighting as a musician and a poet.

On 8 May 1849, he married in Paris Claire d'Agoult (1830-1912), daughter of Marie d'Agoult (1805-1876)—her nom de plume being Daniel Stern—, at whose literary salon he had become a regular after meeting Honoré de Balzac in Dresden in countess Hanska's salon. For eight years he was an inspector of the Chemins de Fer du Nord. In 1857 he entered journalism and gave a large number of articles on agronomy and zootechnics in the Journal de l'Agriculture and in La Presse. A pupil of Émile Baudement, he was a specialist in agricultural issues and the rural economy. He was decorated with the Legion of Honour on 13 August 1864. He was one of the first five founders of the Société des agriculteurs de France.

He wrote many literary headings and joined Émile de Girardin at La Liberté newspaper for the musical and literary critics. It was at this time (1864) that his duel took place with Gaston de Galliffet, then a colonel. In 1868–1869 he published Portraits de femmes. After the War of 1870-71, he returned to the Bien Public, created by friends of Adolphe Thiers, where he wrote for four years musical and literary criticism.

He came to live at the castle of Bois-Monbourcher in Anjou at Chambellay from 1880 to the death of his mother in 1899. There he wrote his various novels. including Le Baron Vampire, an antisemitic publication. He took charge of the literary magazine La Revue angevine.

His son, Daniel de Charnacé (1851 – 1942), a former naval officer, then a farmer and a breeder, settled at the Bois-Montbourcher in 1876, with his grandfather, the Marquis Ernest de Charnacé (1800-1884), who had just completed the restoration of the castle and succeeded him as mayor of Chambellay from 1884 to 1942, thus holding the record of longevity to this municipal function.

His name was given to a steeple chase competition.

== Writings ==
- 1863: Études d'économie rurale, Paris: Michel Lévy frères, in-12, 301 p.
- 1864: Études sur les animaux domestiques. Amélioration des races. Consanguinité. Haras., Paris: V. Masson et fils, in-12, VIII-384 p.
- 1866-1869: Les femmes d'aujourd'hui. Esquisses, Paris: M. Lévy frères, in-18 Read online.
- 1867: Les Principes de zootechnie de Baudement, in-12, Delagrave.
- 1868: Les Étoiles du chant... Adelina Patti, Christina Nilsson, Gabrielle Krauss, Paris, Plon, gr. in-8.
- 1868: Les Mérinos by Émile Baudement, preceded by Considérations générales sur l'espèce ovine by Count Guy de Charnacé, Paris: C. Delagrave, 199 p. : fig.; in-18; series Bibliothèque de l'agriculture published under the direction of J.-A. Barral.
- 1869: Les Races chevalines en France, Paris: C. Delagrave, In-12, 89 p., fig.
- 1869: Les Races bovines en France. Éléments de zootechnie., Paris: C. Delagrave, In-12, 98 p., fig.
- 1869: Discours prononcés à la distribution des prix du Concours agricole du canton de Sablé par M. le vicomte de Charnacé, président du comice, les 6 septembre 1868 et 5 septembre 1869, Sablé: Choisnet, in-8°, 15 p.
- 1869: Nouveaux Portraits, Paris: M. Lévy frères.
- 1870: Les Compositeurs français et les théâtres lyriques subventionnés, Paris: Édouard Dentu, in-8°, 61 p.
- 1872: Réponse à l'Homme-Femme de M. Alexandre Dumas fils, Paris: E. Lachaud, in-16, 30 p.
- 1873: Musique et musiciens, critical fragments by Mr. Richard Wagner, translated and annotated, Paris: Pottier de Lalaine, 2 vol. in-12.
- 1874: Causeries sur mes contemporains... , Paris: É. Dentu, In-12, III-460 p.
- 1879: Drames mystérieux, Heymann et Perois, 1879.
- 1881: Une parvenue, Paris: Paul Ollendorff, 225 p.; in-12.
- 1882: Un homme fatal, Paris: Paul Ollendorff.
- 1885: Le Baron Vampire, Paris: E. Dentu, in-12, 309 p.
- 1886: Souvenirs d'une jument de chasse, suivis de : Écoute à Bois Rosé..., Paris : Pairault, in-12, 107 p., fig.
- 1887: Les Veneurs ennemis, Paris: Pairault, In-12, 230 p., fig.
- 1887: Vaincu.
- 1888: Aventures et portraits.
- 1890: Le Chasseur noir, souvenirs d'une jument de chasse. Écoute à Bois Rosé., Paris: Édouard Dentu, In-16, 245 p.
- 1890: Sur le Vif, portraits, Paris: A. Savine, In-16, 281 p.
- 1892: Expiation, suivi de Elles et nous, et de Renée, Paris: A. Savine, in-12, 282 p.
- 1893: L'Amour et l'argent; [Une confession]; [Coquette], Paris: A. Savine, In-16, 274 p.
- 1894: Journal d'un amoureux, Paris: L. Grasilier, In-16, 143 p.
- 1894: R. Wagner jugé par un Allemand, Angers: Lachèze, In-8°, 50 p.
- 1895: L'Esclave, Paris, P. Ollendorf, 305 p.
- 1897: Portraits angevins, par l'Ermite de la chaussée Saint-Pierre (G. de Charnacé), Angers: Lachèze, in-8°, 65 p.
- 1900: Notes d'un philosophe provincial, Paris: Perrin, in-12, XI-295 p.
- 1902-1906: Hommes et choses du temps présent, Paris: E. Paul, 4 vol. in-12°.
- 1903: Wagner jugé par Nietzsche [S. l.], paginé 39-4; In-8, excerpt from le Carnet, October–December 1903.
- 1903: Un ambassadeur de Louis XIII (Charnacé), Paris: édition de la Nouvelle Revue, in-8°, 43 p.
- 1903: Femmes d'à présent, portraits, Paris: E. Paul, In-12, XXVI-124 p.
- 1908: Lettres à ma petite-fille, Paris: E. Paul, In-16, 418 p., portr.
- 1909: Essais de psychologie intime, Paris: Nouvelle Librairie nationale, In-16, 345 p.
- 1909: Veneurs excentriques : short stories, Paris: Pairault et Cie, 197 p.; 19 cm + 2 photos.

Translation

- 1870: Lettres de Gluck et de Weber publiées par M. L. Nohl... traduites par Guy de Charnacé. Ouvrage orné de portraits et d'autographes, Paris: Henry Plon, 279 p. : portr., fac-sim., music; in-8°.

== Bibliography ==
- Henri Carnoy, Dictionnaire biographique international des écrivains, Paris : Imprimerie de l'armorial français, [1902]-1909.
