= Azay =

Azay may refer to the following communes in France:

- Azay-le-Brûlé, in the Deux-Sèvres department
- Azay-le-Ferron, in the Indre department
- Azay-le-Rideau, in the Indre-et-Loire department
  - Château d'Azay-le-Rideau, a chateau in Azay-le-Rideau
- Azay-sur-Cher, in the Indre-et-Loire department
- Azay-sur-Indre, in the Indre-et-Loire department
- Azay-sur-Thouet, in the Deux-Sèvres department

== See also ==
- Azé (disambiguation)
