= Canton of Château-Gontier-sur-Mayenne-2 =

Coordinates: 47.83°N 0.71°W

The canton of Château-Gontier-sur-Mayenne-2 (before March 2020: canton of Château-Gontier) is an administrative division of the Mayenne department, northwestern France. It was created at the French canton reorganisation which came into effect in March 2015. Its seat is in Château-Gontier-sur-Mayenne.

It consists of the following communes:

1. Bouchamps-lès-Craon
2. Château-Gontier-sur-Mayenne (partly)
3. Chérancé
4. Craon
5. Denazé
6. Marigné-Peuton
7. Mée
8. Niafles
9. Peuton
10. Pommerieux
11. Prée-d'Anjou
12. Saint-Quentin-les-Anges
