= Château-Gontier =

Commune in Mayenne, France

- Part of Château-Gontier-sur-Mayenne
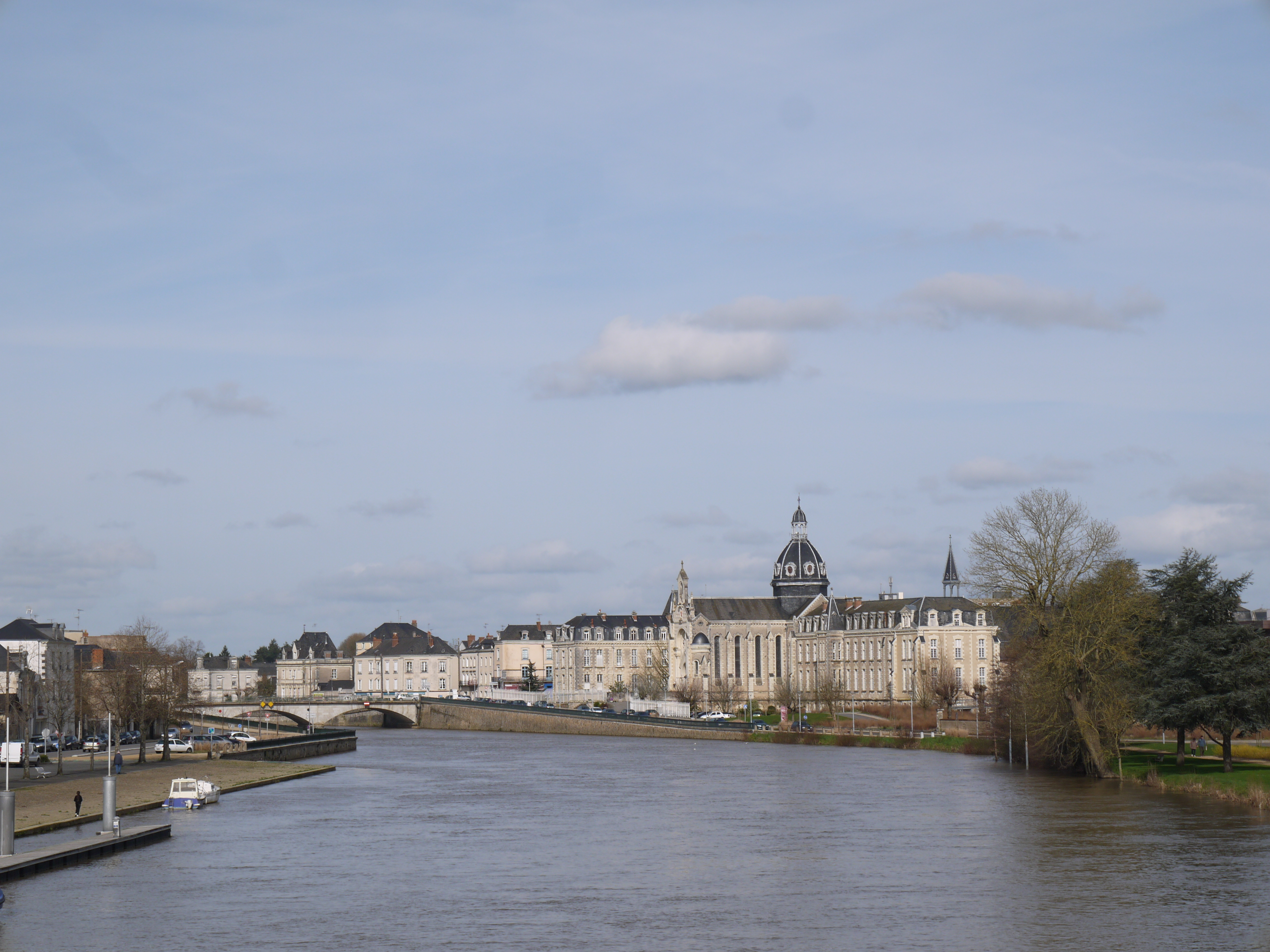
- Château-Gontier seen from the Europe Bridge

- Coat of arms
- Location of Château-Gontier
- Location within France Location within Pays de la Loire
- Coordinates: 47°49′43″N 0°42′10″W
- Country: France
- Region: Pays de la Loire
- Department: Mayenne
- Arrondissement: Château-Gontier
- Canton: Château-Gontier
- Commune: Château-Gontier-sur-Mayenne
- Area^{1}: 27.88 km^{2} (10.76 sq mi)
- Elevation: 83 m (272 ft)
- Highest elevation: 99 m (325 ft)
- Lowest elevation: 26 m (85 ft)
- Population (2022): 11,422
  - Density: 409.7/km^{2} (1,061/sq mi)
- Time zone: UTC+01:00 (CET)
  - Summer (DST): UTC+02:00 (CEST)
- Postal code: 53200
- ^{1} French Land Register data, which excludes lakes, ponds, glaciers > 1 km^{2} (0.386 sq mi or 247 acres) and river estuaries.

Château-Gontier (French pronunciation: [ʃɑto ɡɔ̃tje]) is a former commune in the Mayenne department in north-western France. On 1 January 2019, it was merged into the new commune Château-Gontier-sur-Mayenne.

== Geography ==
It is about 30 km (19 mi) south of Laval, the préfecture of the department of Mayenne. Château-Gontier is home to the Refuge de l'Arche, also known as the Ark Refuge , a refuge for abandoned or mistreated animals.

== History ==
There are chalybeate springs close to the town. Château-Gontier owes its origin and its name to a castle erected in the first half of the 11th century by Gunther, the steward of Fulk Nerra of Anjou, on the site of a farm belonging to the monks of St Aubin d’Angers. On the extinction of the family, the lordship was assigned by Louis XI of France to Philippe de Comines. The town suffered severely during the wars of the League. In 1793 it was occupied by the Vendeans.

== Culture and heritage ==
The following buildings have been listed as historical monuments:

- The ruined 13th century castle
- The 11th century church of Saint John Baptist
- The church of the Holy Trinity
- The 12th century chapel of Le Genneteil
- The 16th century chapel of Le Moulinet
- The 17th century Hôtel de Lantivy

== People ==
- Roséva Bidois (born 2000) competed for the Union Pour l'Athlétisme à Château-Gontier sports club here.
- Conan II, Duke of Brittany was found dead here during the Breton Norman Wars, likely the victim of poisoning.
- Claude Pompidou was born here.
- General Emile-René Lemonnier was born and buried here.
- Louis-François Allard (1735-1819), physician and politician.
- Guy de Charnacé (1825–1909), agronomist, writer, musicologist was born here.
- Alexis Roger, French composer (1814–1846), was born here.
- Olivier Peslier, French horse racing jockey was born here.

== Climate ==
Climate data for Château-Gontier (Coudray) (1996–2020 normals, extremes 1972–present)
Month	Jan	Feb	Mar	Apr	May	Jun	Jul	Aug	Sep	Oct	Nov	Dec	Year
Record high °C (°F)	16.1 (61.0)	21.9 (71.4)	25.5 (77.9)	29.2 (84.6)	34.0 (93.2)	38.4 (101.1)	39.8 (103.6)	39.1 (102.4)	36.6 (97.9)	30.6 (87.1)	21.5 (70.7)	18.0 (64.4)	39.8 (103.6)
Mean daily maximum °C (°F)	8.8 (47.8)	10.3 (50.5)	13.5 (56.3)	17.0 (62.6)	20.5 (68.9)	24.0 (75.2)	25.9 (78.6)	25.9 (78.6)	23.0 (73.4)	17.7 (63.9)	12.4 (54.3)	9.3 (48.7)	17.4 (63.3)
Daily mean °C (°F)	5.5 (41.9)	6.2 (43.2)	8.5 (47.3)	11.0 (51.8)	14.5 (58.1)	17.8 (64.0)	19.5 (67.1)	19.4 (66.9)	16.7 (62.1)	13.1 (55.6)	8.6 (47.5)	5.9 (42.6)	12.2 (54.0)
Mean daily minimum °C (°F)	2.3 (36.1)	2.0 (35.6)	3.4 (38.1)	5.0 (41.0)	8.6 (47.5)	11.6 (52.9)	13.1 (55.6)	13.0 (55.4)	10.4 (50.7)	8.4 (47.1)	4.9 (40.8)	2.6 (36.7)	7.1 (44.8)
Record low °C (°F)	−16.0 (3.2)	−13.2 (8.2)	−11.9 (10.6)	−4.0 (24.8)	−2.2 (28.0)	0.2 (32.4)	5.0 (41.0)	4.9 (40.8)	1.0 (33.8)	−3.5 (25.7)	−6.8 (19.8)	−9.4 (15.1)	−16.0 (3.2)
Average precipitation mm (inches)	69.8 (2.75)	56.1 (2.21)	50.2 (1.98)	52.6 (2.07)	58.5 (2.30)	53.1 (2.09)	46.2 (1.82)	43.2 (1.70)	61.9 (2.44)	71.3 (2.81)	76.6 (3.02)	78.9 (3.11)	718.4 (28.28)
Average precipitation days (≥ 1.0 mm)	12.1	10.0	9.5	9.6	9.6	7.2	6.4	7.1	7.9	10.9	11.7	12.3	114.3
Source: Meteociel

== See also ==
- Communes of the Mayenne department
