= Château-Gontier-sur-Mayenne =

- Subprefecture and commune
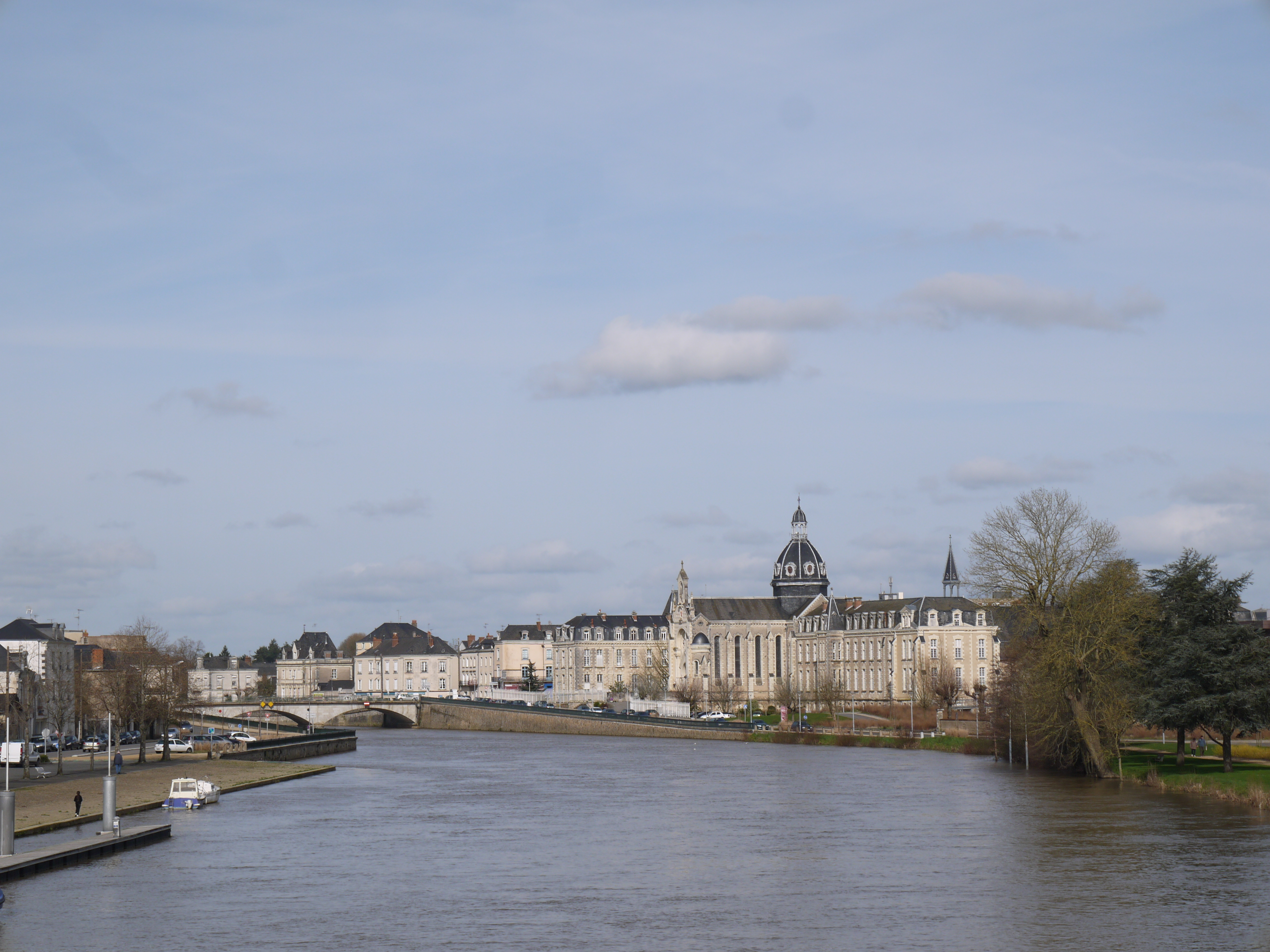
- Château-Gontier seen from the Europe Bridge
- Location of Château-Gontier-sur-Mayenne
- Location within France Location within Pays de la Loire
- Coordinates: 47°49′43″N 0°42′10″W
- Country: France
- Region: Pays de la Loire
- Department: Mayenne
- Arrondissement: Château-Gontier
- Canton: Château-Gontier-sur-Mayenne-1 and 2

Government
  - Mayor (2020–2026): Philippe Henry
- Area^{1}: 68.49 km^{2} (26.44 sq mi)
- Highest elevation: 99 m (325 ft)
- Lowest elevation: 22 m (72 ft)
- Population (2023): 16,584
  - Density: 242.1/km^{2} (627.1/sq mi)
- Time zone: UTC+01:00 (CET)
  - Summer (DST): UTC+02:00 (CEST)
- INSEE/Postal code: 53062 /53200
- ^{1} French Land Register data, which excludes lakes, ponds, glaciers > 1 km^{2} (0.386 sq mi or 247 acres) and river estuaries.

Château-Gontier-sur-Mayenne (French pronunciation: [ʃɑto ɡɔ̃tje syʁ majɛn]) is a commune in the Mayenne department in north-western France. It was established on 1 January 2019 by merger of the former communes of Château-Gontier (the seat), Azé and Saint-Fort.

== Population ==
Historical population
Year	Pop.	±% p.a.
1968	10,875	—
1975	12,339	+1.82%
1982	13,624	+1.43%
1990	14,944	+1.16%
1999	15,701	+0.55%
2007	16,010	+0.24%
2012	16,660	+0.80%
2017	16,776	+0.14%
2023	16,584	−0.19%
Populations of the area corresponding with the commune of Château-Gontier-sur-Mayenne at 1 January 2025. Source: INSEE

== See also ==
- Communes of the Mayenne department
