= Craon, Mayenne =

Craon
- Commune
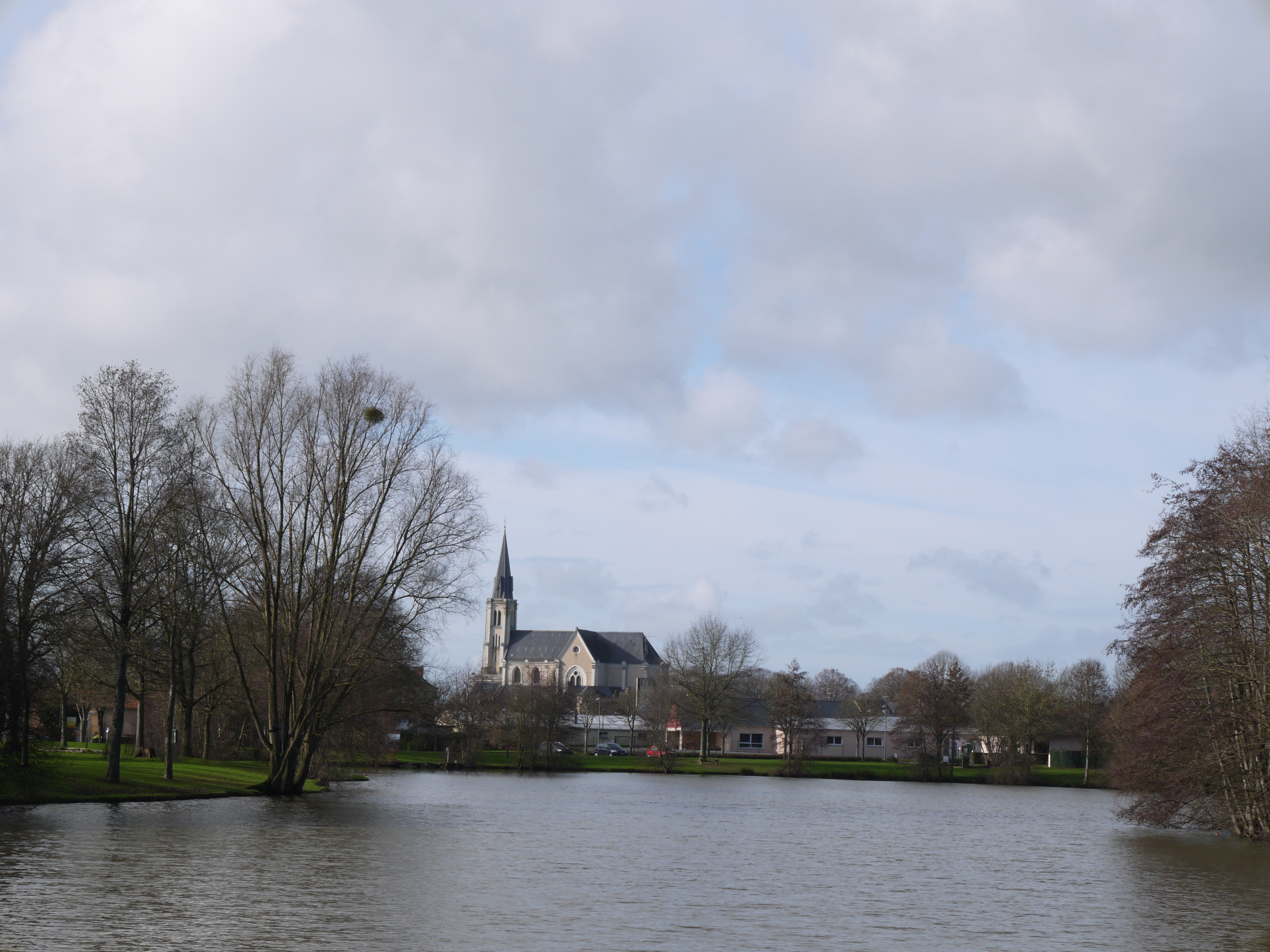
- The church of Saint-Nicolas, seen beyond the water from Mûrier

- Coat of arms
- Location of Craon
- Location within France Location within Pays de la Loire
- Coordinates: 47°50′56″N 0°56′55″W
- Country: France
- Region: Pays de la Loire
- Department: Mayenne
- Arrondissement: Château-Gontier
- Canton: Château-Gontier-sur-Mayenne-2

Government
  - Mayor (2020–2026): Bertrand de Guebriant
- Area^{1}: 24.56 km^{2} (9.48 sq mi)
- Elevation: 40 m (130 ft)
- Highest elevation: 83 m (272 ft)
- Lowest elevation: 32 m (105 ft)
- Population (2023): 4,431
  - Density: 180.4/km^{2} (467.3/sq mi)
- Time zone: UTC+01:00 (CET)
  - Summer (DST): UTC+02:00 (CEST)
- INSEE/Postal code: 53084 /53400
- ^{1} French Land Register data, which excludes lakes, ponds, glaciers > 1 km^{2} (0.386 sq mi or 247 acres) and river estuaries.

Craon (French pronunciation: [kʁã]) is a commune in the Mayenne department in north-western France.

== Geography ==
The river Oudon flows through the middle of the commune and through the town of Craon.

== Population ==
Historical population
Year	Pop.	±% p.a.
1968	4,482	—
1975	4,661	+0.56%
1982	4,829	+0.51%
1990	4,767	−0.16%
1999	4,659	−0.25%
2007	4,648	−0.03%
2012	4,506	−0.62%
2017	4,507	+0.00%
2023	4,431	−0.28%
Source: INSEE

== Monuments ==
Craon is home to the 18th century Château de Craon.

== Gallery ==
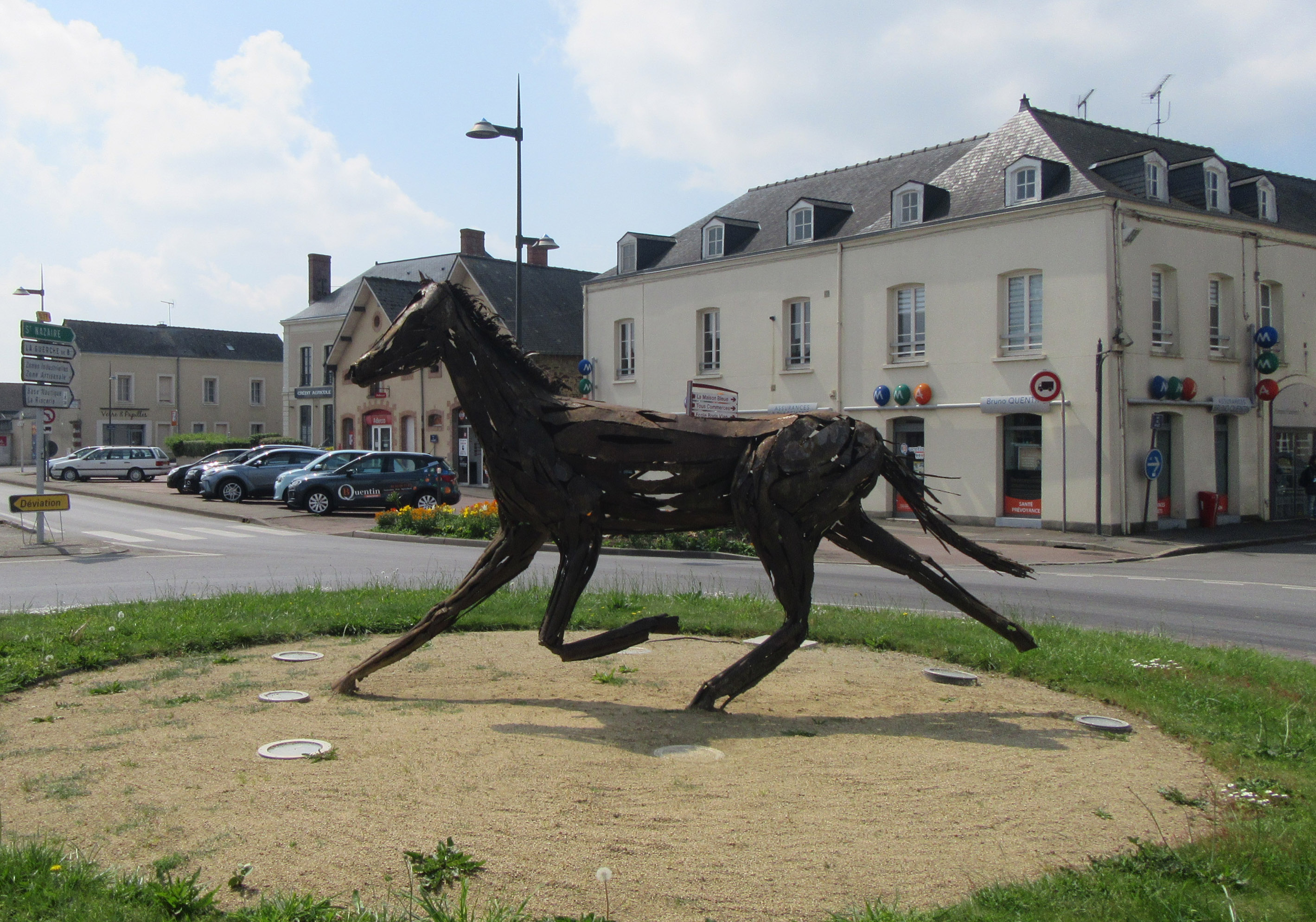
Monument at crossing streets D771 and D22.

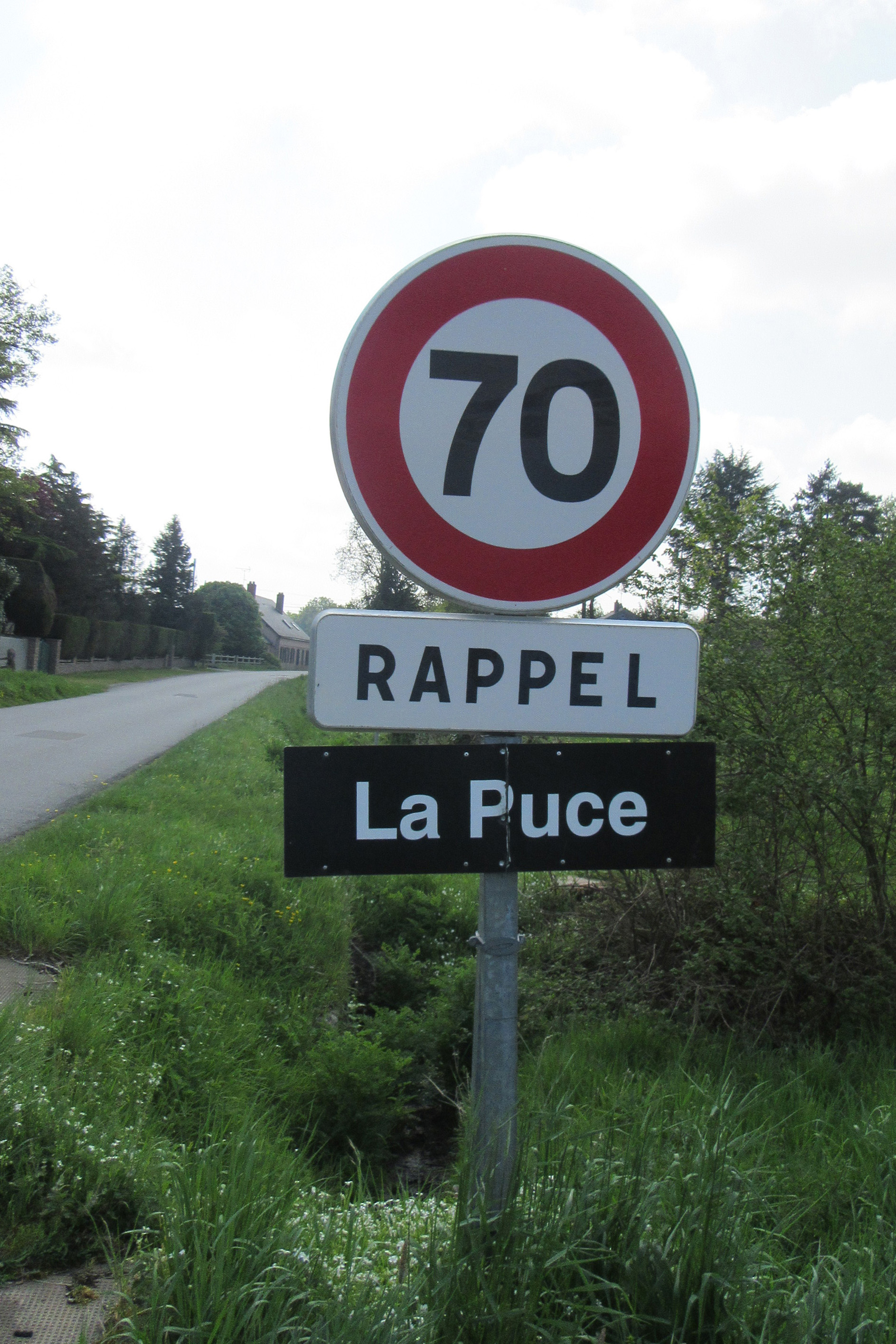
Hamlet of La Puce

== See also ==
- Communes of the Mayenne department
