= Canton of Château-Gontier-sur-Mayenne-1 =

Coordinates: 47.82°N 0.68°W

The canton of Château-Gontier-sur-Mayenne-1 (before March 2020: canton of Azé) is an administrative division of the Mayenne department, northwestern France. It was created at the French canton reorganisation which came into effect in March 2015. Its seat is in Château-Gontier-sur-Mayenne.

It consists of the following communes:

1. Bierné-les-Villages
2. Château-Gontier-sur-Mayenne (partly)
3. Châtelain
4. Chemazé
5. Coudray
6. Daon
7. Fromentières
8. Gennes-Longuefuye
9. Houssay
10. Ménil
11. Origné
12. La Roche-Neuville
13. Saint-Denis-d'Anjou
