= Mayenne =

Department of France

- Department
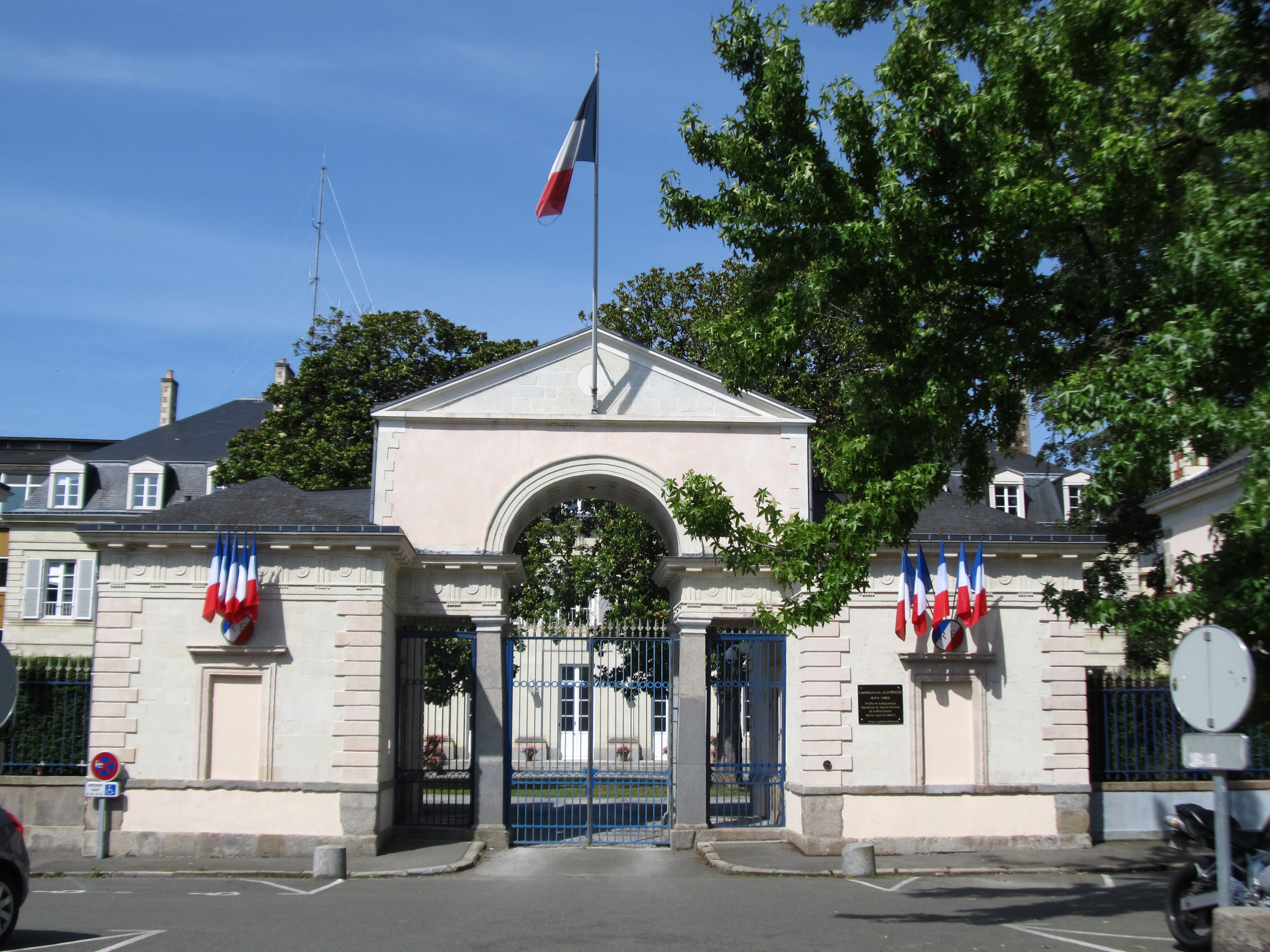
- Prefecture building of the Mayenne department, in Laval

- Flag Coat of arms

- Location of Mayenne in France
- Coordinates: 48°10′N 0°40′W
- Country: France
- Region: Pays de la Loire
- Prefecture: Laval
- Subprefectures: Château-Gontier-sur-Mayenne; Mayenne

Government
  - President of the Departmental Council: Olivier Richefou

Area^{1}
  - Total: 5,175 km^{2} (1,998 sq mi)

Population (2023)
  - Total: 305,468
  - Rank: 75th
  - Density: 59.03/km^{2} (152.9/sq mi)
- Demonyms: Mayennais, Mayennaise
- Time zone: UTC+1 (CET)
  - Summer (DST): UTC+2 (CEST)
- Department number: 53
- Arrondissements: 3
- Cantons: 17
- Communes: 240
- ^1 French Land Register data, which exclude estuaries, and lakes, ponds, and glaciers larger than 1 km^{2}

Mayenne (French: [majɛn]) is a landlocked department in northwest France named after the river Mayenne. Mayenne is part of the administrative region of Pays de la Loire and is surrounded by the departments of Manche, Orne, Sarthe, Maine-et-Loire, and Ille-et-Vilaine.

Mayenne is one of the original 83 departments created during the French Revolution on 4 March 1790. The northern two thirds correspond to the western part of the former province of Maine. The southern third of Mayenne corresponds to the northern portion of the old province of Anjou. The inhabitants of the department are called Mayennais. It had a population of 305,468 in 2023.

== History ==
Like 82 other departments, Mayenne was created on 4 March 1790 during the early stages of the French Revolution by order of the National Constituent Assembly. The new departments were to be uniformly administered and approximately equal to one another in size and population. The former province of Maine was partitioned into two, Upper Maine, centred on Le Mans, became the new department of Sarthe, and Lower Maine, centred on Laval became the new department of Mayenne. Anjou, to the south, being too big to form a single department, was reduced in size and became Maine-et-Loire. In this partition, Sarthe received the region of La Flèche, and Mayenne received Château-Gontier and Craon. Flax was a feature of the Mayenne economy, and the southern limit for the cultivation of flax was used to determine the new border between Mayenne and Maine-et-Loire.

The American first army's 90th Infantry Division were tasked with capturing the town in 1944.

== Geography ==
Mayenne is a department in northwestern France and is part of the region of Pays de la Loire. The department does not have a sea coast, but about thirty kilometres to the northwest is Mont Saint-Michel Bay. The capital and largest town is Laval in the centre of the department. To the north lies the department of Orne, to the east lies Sarthe, to the south lies Maine-et-Loire, to the west lies Ille-et-Vilaine and to the northwest lies Manche. The department forms a roughly rectangular shape, being 90 km (56 mi) long by 77 km (48 mi) wide, with a total area of about 5,175 km^{2} (1,998 mi^{2}). The river Mayenne flows centrally through it from north to south, passing through the towns of Mayenne, Laval and Château-Gontier. After leaving the department, the river joins the river Sarthe to form the Maine which later joins the Loire.

The department is varied in topography. Much of it is largely flat, but there are also hilly areas, some with steep-sided valleys and ravines. Of the total area of 516,189 hectares (1,275,532 acres), some 354,000 hectares (875,000 acres) are arable, 69,000 hectares (170,000 acres) are grassland, 26,000 hectares (65,000 acres) are forests and woodland and 50,000 acres (20,200 ha) are heathland and moorland. To the north lies the Armorican Massif, a plateau that has been eroded over time, the highest summit of which, the Mont des Avaloirs, is the highest point in the department at 417 m (1,368 ft) above sea level. A branch range to the south of this plateau forms the ridge that divides the Mayenne Valley from the Vilaine Valley.

The department is subdivided into three arrondissements: Mayenne, Laval, and Château-Gontier; and is coincident with the Roman Catholic Diocese of Laval.

=== Principal towns ===
The most populous commune is Laval, the prefecture. As of 2023, there are 8 communes with more than 5,000 inhabitants:

Commune	Population (2023)
Laval	49,400
Château-Gontier-sur-Mayenne	16,584
Mayenne	12,883
Évron	8,252
Saint-Berthevin	7,479
Changé	6,502
Bonchamp-lès-Laval	6,302
Ernée	5,499

== Demographics ==
Population development since 1801:

Historical population

Year	Pop.	±% p.a.
1801	305,654	—
1806	332,253	+1.68%
1821	343,819	+0.23%
1831	352,586	+0.25%
1841	361,392	+0.25%
1851	374,566	+0.36%
1861	375,163	+0.02%
1872	350,637	−0.61%
1881	344,881	−0.18%
1891	332,387	−0.37%
1901	313,103	−0.60%
1911	297,732	−0.50%
1921	262,447	−1.25%
1931	254,479	−0.31%

Year	Pop.	±% p.a.
1936	251,348	−0.25%
1946	256,317	+0.20%
1954	251,522	−0.24%
1962	250,030	−0.07%
1968	252,762	+0.18%
1975	261,789	+0.50%
1982	271,784	+0.54%
1990	278,037	+0.28%
1999	285,338	+0.29%
2007	300,643	+0.66%
2012	307,453	+0.45%
2017	307,445	−0.00%
2023	305,468	−0.11%

== Politics ==
The president of the Departmental Council is Olivier Richefou, elected in 2014.

=== Presidential elections 2nd round ===
Election	Winning candidate	Party	%	2nd place candidate	Party	%
2022	Emmanuel Macron	LREM	64.21	Marine Le Pen	RN	35.79
2017	Emmanuel Macron	LREM	72.02	Marine Le Pen	FN	27.98
2012	Nicolas Sarkozy	UMP	53.07	François Hollande	PS	46.93
2007	Nicolas Sarkozy	UMP	55.45	Ségolène Royal	PS	44.55
2002	Jacques Chirac	RPR	88.59	Jean-Marie Le Pen	FN	11.41
1995	Jacques Chirac	RPR	59.49	Lionel Jospin	PS	40.51

=== Current National Assembly Representatives ===
Constituency	Member	Party
Mayenne's 1st constituency	Guillaume Garot	Socialist Party
Mayenne's 2nd constituency	Géraldine Bannier	MoDem
Mayenne's 3rd constituency	Yannick Favennec Becot	Horizons

== Flora and fauna ==
Mayenne has a diversity of habitat types such as forest, heathland, bog and farmland. Some 1445 species of plants, 63 species of mammals, 280 species of birds, 16 species of amphibians and 11 species of reptiles have been recorded, as well as thousands of species of invertebrates. The peat-lands and bogs are often fringed with woodlands of alder and ash, and in some places carnivorous plants such as sundew and butterwort flourish, fritillaries, marsh cinquefoil and cottongrass grow and butterflies, dragonflies and spiders abound.

The woodlands are mostly small with the deciduous trees dominated by oak. Here roe deer, badger, mole, hedgehog, red deer, red squirrel, fire salamander, Aesculapian snake, middle spotted woodpecker, little owl and white admiral can be found and uncommon plants present including European columbine and wild russet apple.

The dry grasslands, which cover the limestone and sandstone soils, are also rich in fauna and flora. They house the snake Vipera aspis, the Large blue butterfly, the blue-winged grasshopper and the bee orchid. The heathland in the north of Mayenne is populated by dwarf gorse and cross-leaved heath and there are plenty of spiders, nightjars and warblers. The old quarries are the refuge of bats, amphibians, the shining cranesbill and greater butterfly orchid. Rivers and ponds are home to eel, northern crested newt, European otter, kingfisher, grass snake, common moorhen and plants such as spearwort, yellow flag, arrowhead and Isopyrum thalictroides, a small poisonous plant.

== Economy ==
The department is largely rural with about 80% being used for agriculture, 8% being urban area and the remainder forest, heath and plantations. Livestock farming predominates, with the breeding of cattle, horses and pigs, and also bee-keeping being important. The soil is generally poor, but it is of better quality around Laval and Château-Gontier. In these parts corn is cultivated and there are plantings of hemp, flax, fruits and vines. There are many apple orchards and large quantities of cider are made. The department is rich in mineral resources; iron and coal are mined and there are quarries for marble, slate, building stone, limestone and flint; the white sand deposits are used in the manufacture of glass.

Industries include the manufacture of linen, paper and hemp, and cider-making is traditionally carried on in the department. Office furniture is manufactured in Château-Gontier, and Laval is active in the industrial sector, with dairy products, electronics and chemicals in a modern science park.

== Tourism ==
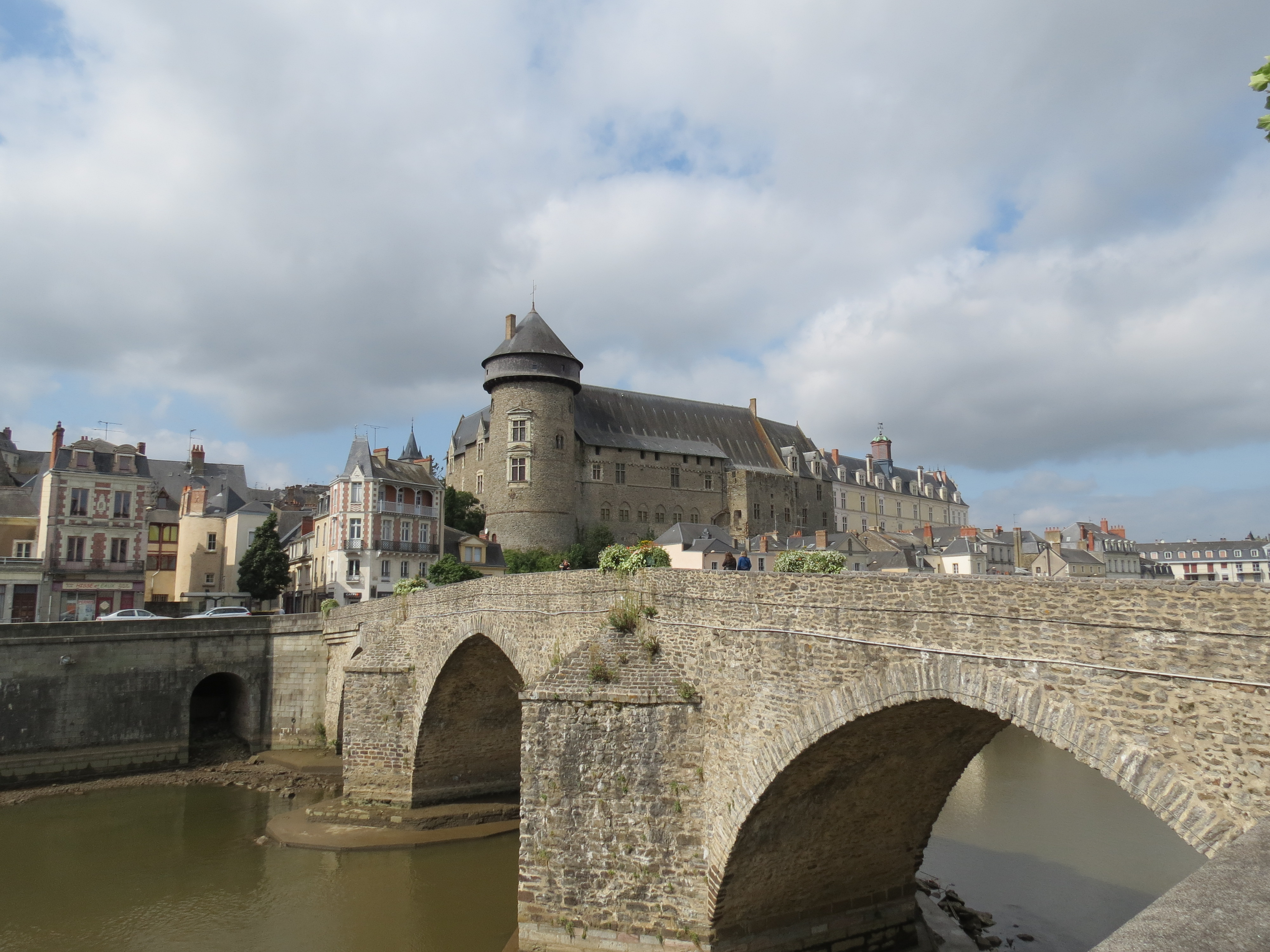
Laval

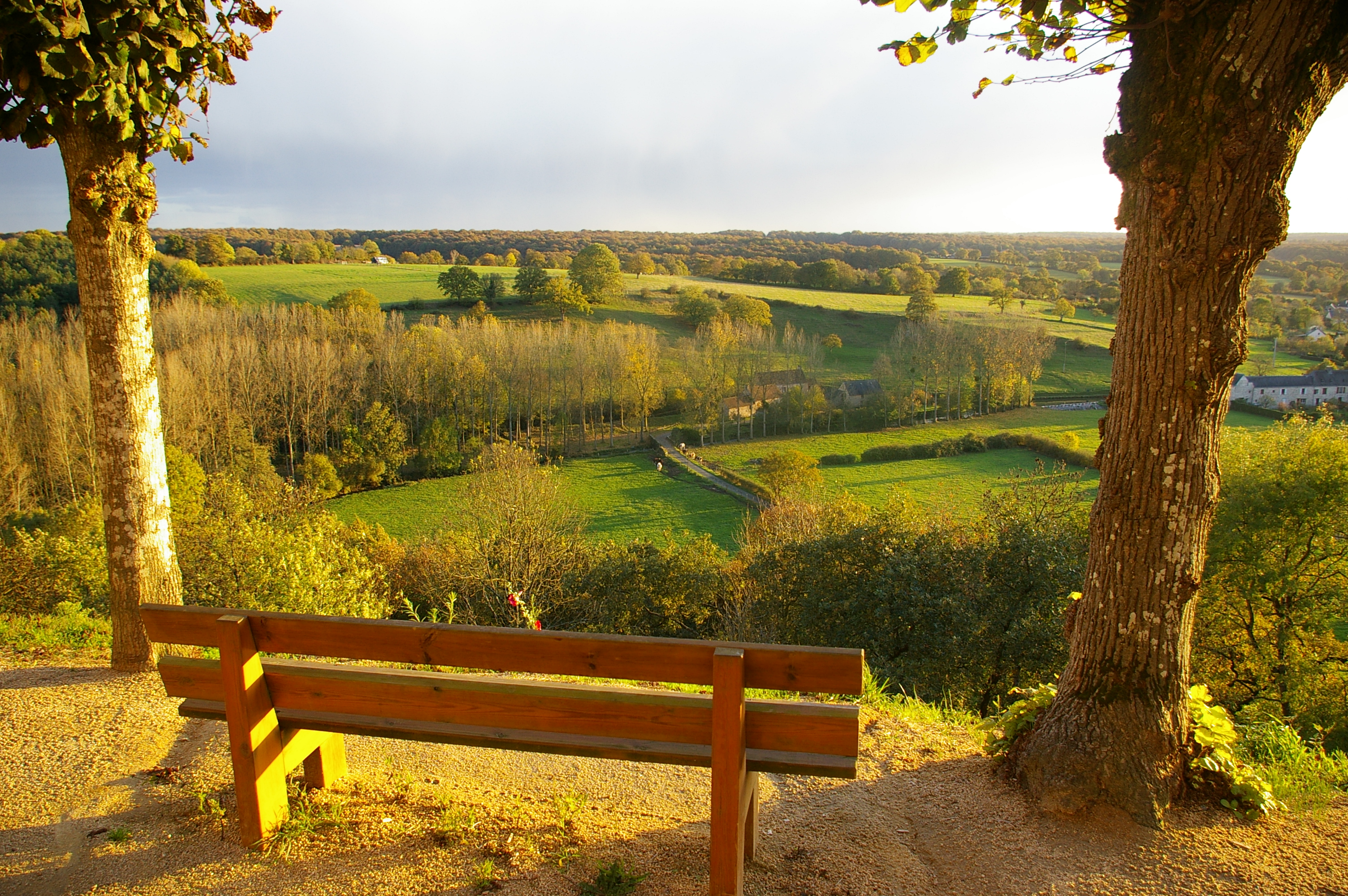
View from the Armorican Massif

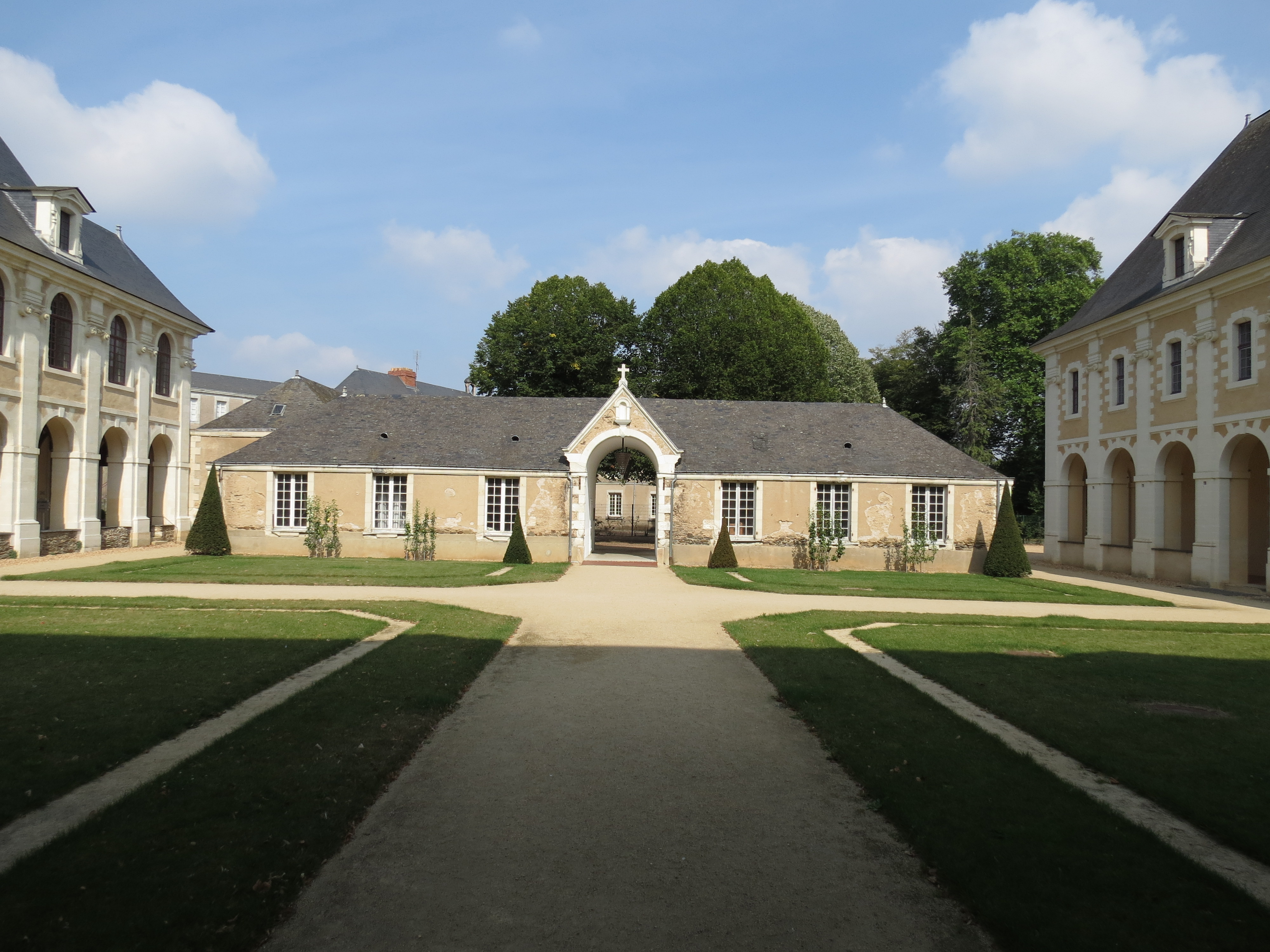
Abbey in Château-Gontier

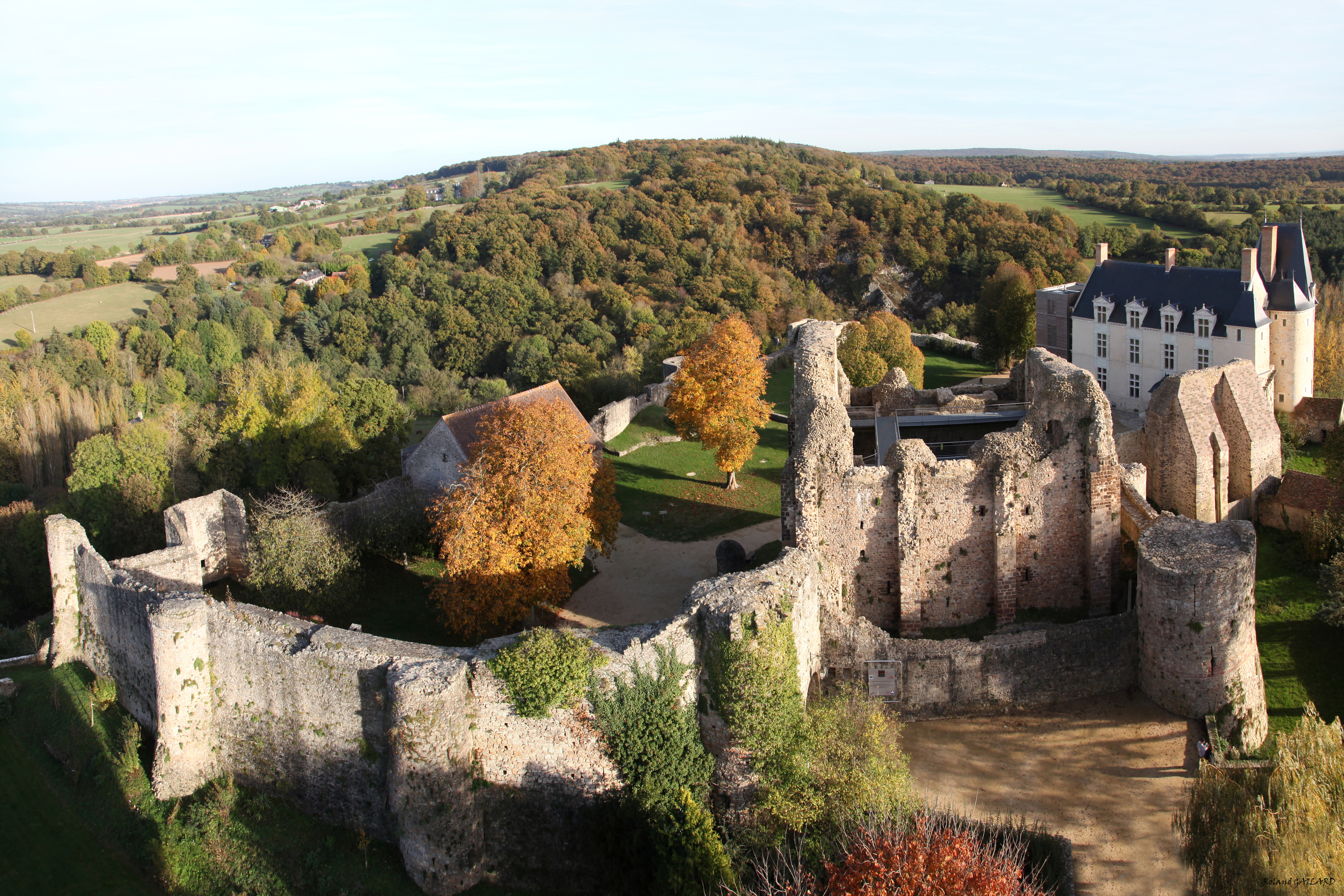
Château de Sainte-Suzanne

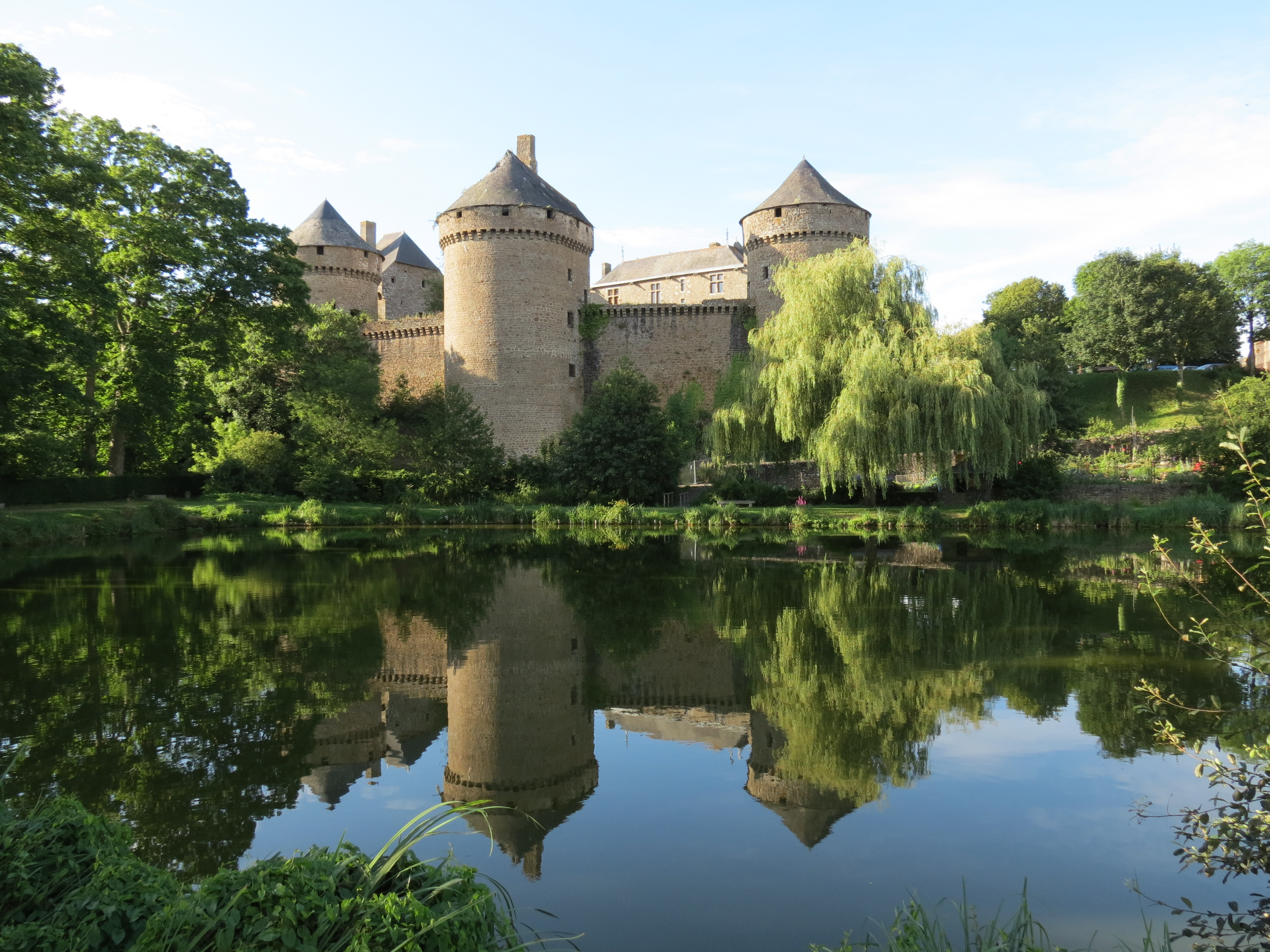
Chateau de Lassay

== See also ==
- Cantons of the Mayenne department
- Communes of the Mayenne department
- Arrondissements of the Mayenne department
- Duke of Mayenne
- Departmental Council of Mayenne
- Jublains archeological site
