= List of castles in the Pays de la Loire =

This list of castles in the Pays de la Loire is a list of medieval castles or château forts in the region in western France.

Links in italics are links to articles in the French Wikipedia.

== Loire-Atlantique ==
Name	Date	Condition	Image	Ownership / Access	Notes
Château d'Ancenis	15th century	Substantially intact			
Château de Blain	13-16th century	Substantially intact			Remodelled 16th century.
Château de la Bretesche	15th century	Reconstructed			Reconstructed 19th century
Château de Careil	14-16th century	Substantially intact			
Château des ducs de Bretagne	1466	Restored		Ville de Nantes	Houses Nantes History Museum.
Château de Châteaubriant	11-16th century	Intact			Medieval castle remodelled as Renaissance château.
Château de Clisson	13-15th century	Ruins			
Château de la Motte-Glain	15-17th century	Substantially intact			Remodelled 17th century.
Château de Pornic	12-15th century	Restored		Private	Restored 19th century, belonged to Gilles de Rais in the 15th century.
Château de Ranrouët	12th century	Ruins			

== Maine-et-Loire ==
Name	Date	Condition	Image	Ownership / Access	Notes
Château d'Angers	13th century	Substantially intact		City of Angers	Walls nearly 2,000 ft (610 m) in circumference, incorporating 17 towers originally 130 ft (40 m) high.
Château de Baugé	15th century	Intact			Built as hunting lodge.
Château de Bourmont	16-19th century	Intact and extended		Private	Extended in Neo-Gothic style
Château de Brissac	15-17th century	Rebuilt		Private	Damaged during French Wars of Religion, rebuilt 1611 in baroque style.
Château de Champtocé	13-16th century	Ruins			
Château de Montreuil-Bellay	11-13th century	Substantially intact		Private	Divided into rental units in 1822, restored after 1860.
Château de Montsoreau	1455	Restored		Département	Ruinous by late 19th century, restored, houses the Musée des Goums Marocains.
Château du Plessis-Bourré	1468-1472	Intact		Private (open to the public)	Externally unchanged since the 15th century, working drawbridge.
Château du Plessis-Macé	13-16th century	Intact			Converted to house 15th century.
Château de Pouancé	12-13th century	Ruins			Considered second fortress of Anjou, after Angers.
Château de Saumur	12th century	Restored		City of Saumur	Page for September in the Tres Riches Heures du Duc de Berry depicts the Chateau as it looked in 1410.
Château de la Turmelière	13th century	Ruins			19th century building of same name nearby.

== Mayenne ==
Name	Date	Condition	Image	Ownership / Access	Notes
Château du Bois Thibault	15th century	Ruins		Commune de Lassay-les-Châteaux	On site of earlier castle.
Château de Bouillé	15-16th century	Ruins			
Château de la Courbe de Brée	13-16th century	Substantially intact			
Château de Courtaliéru	13th century	Earthworks			Destroyed 15th century.
Château de Lassay	12-15th century	Intact			
Château de Laval	12-15th century	Intact			Comprises medieval and 19th-century buildings.
Château de Mayenne	11-12th century	Intact		Museum	Incorporates remains of Carolingian palace of c.900.
Château de Montjean	15th century	Ruins			
Château de Mortiercrolles	12-15th century	Substantially intact			Transitional style between Gothic and Renaissance.
Château de Sainte-Suzanne	11th century	Ruins			
Château de Thorigné-en-Charnie	11-15th century	Ruins			

== Sarthe ==
Name	Date	Condition	Image	Ownership / Access	Notes
Château de Ballon	15th century	Intact			
Château de Bazouges	15th century	Intact		Private	
Château du Mans	11-15th century	Ruins			
Château de Courtanvaux	14-15th century	Intact		Commune de Bessé-sur-Braye	
Château de Sillé-le-Guillaume	15-17th century	Intact		Commune	Remodelled 16-17th centuries.

== Vendée ==
Name	Date	Condition	Image	Ownership / Access	Notes
Château d'Apremont	1534-42	Substantially intact			
Château de Commequiers	15th century	Ruins			
Château de Noirmoutier	12th century	Restored		Commune	
Château de Pouzauges	12th century	Ruins			
Château de Sainte-Hermine	13-17th century				
Château de Talmont	12th century	Ruins			
Château de Tiffauges	12-16th century	Ruins			Known as Bluebeard's castle, associated with the notorious murderer, Gilles de Rais (c. 1405 – 1440).
Tour Mélusine (keep) and fortified city	12th or 13th century	Fragment		Town of Vouvant	Keep and a lot of the wall enclosure, like the last city's gate, survives.
Tour de Moricq	15th century	Substantially intact			Keep survives.
Vieux-château de l'Île d'Yeu	14th century	Ruins			

== See also ==
- List of castles in France
- List of châteaux in France
