= Château du Bois Thibault =

15th-century ruined castle in Lassay-les-Châteaux, Pays de la Loire, France

- Lassay-les-Châteaux, Mayenne, Pays de la Loire in France
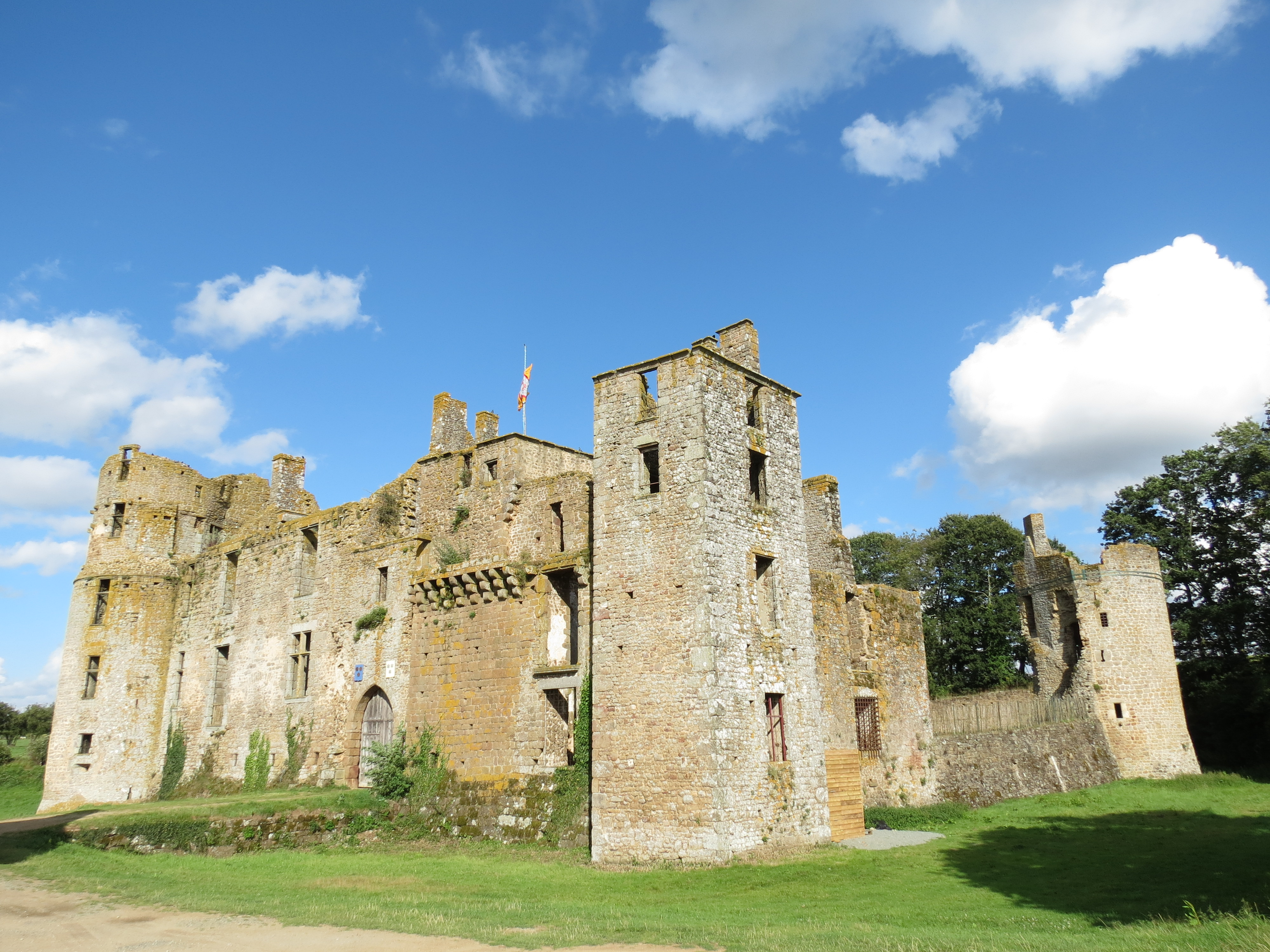
- Château du Bois Thibault

Site information
- Type: Castle
- Owner: Commune of Lassay-les-Châteaux
- Open to the public: Yes
- Condition: Ruined

Location
- Location of Château du Bois Thibault in the Pays de la Loire region
- Coordinates: 48.448005°N 0.502704°W

Site history
- Built: 15th century
- Battles/wars: French Wars of Religion

Monument historique
- Official name: Château de Bois-Thibaut (restes)
- Designated: 22 October 1925
- Reference no.: PA00109521

The Château du Bois Thibault is a 15th-century ruined castle in the commune of Lassay-les-Châteaux, Pays de la Loire, France. It was owned by the du Bellay family for nearly 300 years. It is a listed national historic monument of France.

== History ==
A castle was originally built on the site in the 11th century by Geoffrey II, Count of Anjou, as a defense against William the Conqueror. The lands came into the possession of the Logé (or Lougé) family in the 12th century, who in the 16th century became prominent in Normandy, with a fiefdom seated at the parish of La Lande-de-Lougé.

In 1423, during the Hundred Years' War, the English occupied the Château de Lassay. The Château du Bois Thibault was soon occupied by a company of Scotsmen, fighting on behalf of France, who fortified themselves there, but were overrun by the English. Jean II, Duke of Alençon successfully drove the English out of the castle but destroyed it in the process. The land came into the hands of the du Bellay family of Anjou in 1429 by the marriage of Jeanne de Logé and Jean du Bellay, lord du Bellay, who constructed a new castle on the ruins from 1450 to 1462. The left part of the castle dates to this 15th-century construction.

Jean du Bellay's grandson Louis, who was the archdeacon of Paris and adviser to the Parliament, commissioned further work. He constructed the northwestern part of the castle, and added additional architectural details to the other already existing structure, including the pretty armrest overlooking the inner courtyard and the staircase in the adjacent tower.

During the French Wars of Religion, the Huguenots damaged the chapel and destroyed the mausoleum dedicated to Louis du Bellay. The castle remained in the family until 1751, when it changed hands to the Matz du Brossay. During this time, it gradually fell into a state of disrepair. In 1762, the castle was auctioned off to Léonor-François de Tournely, lord of Aulnais. The castle needed significant repairs, and de Tournely began several years of restoration work before he died in 1777. The castle was spared from destruction during the Great Fear on 3 August 1789, when the prévôt of Mayenne, La Raitrie, stepped forward to save castle. After the Revolution, de Tournely's widow and three sons emigrated, and the castle passed through inheritance to the Saint-Paul de Lingeard family.

In 1925, it belonged to the de Broglie family and later, to Parisian antique dealers named Soubrier.

In 1988, the town of Lassay-les-Châteaux bought the ruins and the site. The Cultural Association of Lassay-les-Châteaux offers guided tours, as well as occasional entertainment, including medieval dinners and scavenger hunts.

== Description ==
The castle consists of a rectangular walled enclosure, flanked by four towers. The southwest and northwest buildings are connected by an entrance porch. The south part includes the kitchen, was equipped with a huge fireplace and a bread oven, bedrooms and state rooms. Upstairs were more bedrooms and state rooms. The vaulted cellar survived, featuring a double row of arches.

== Gallery ==
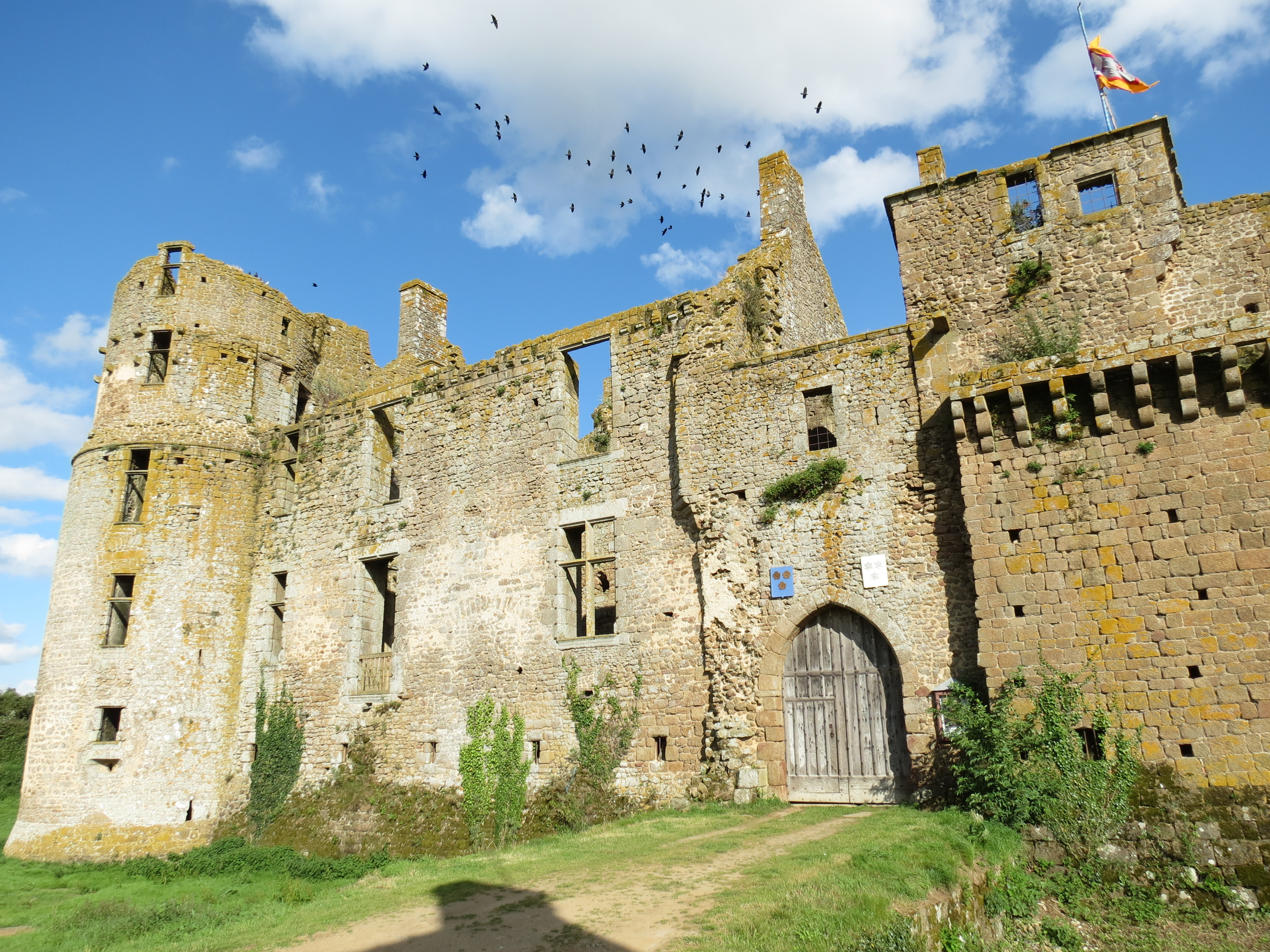
Château du Bois Thibault

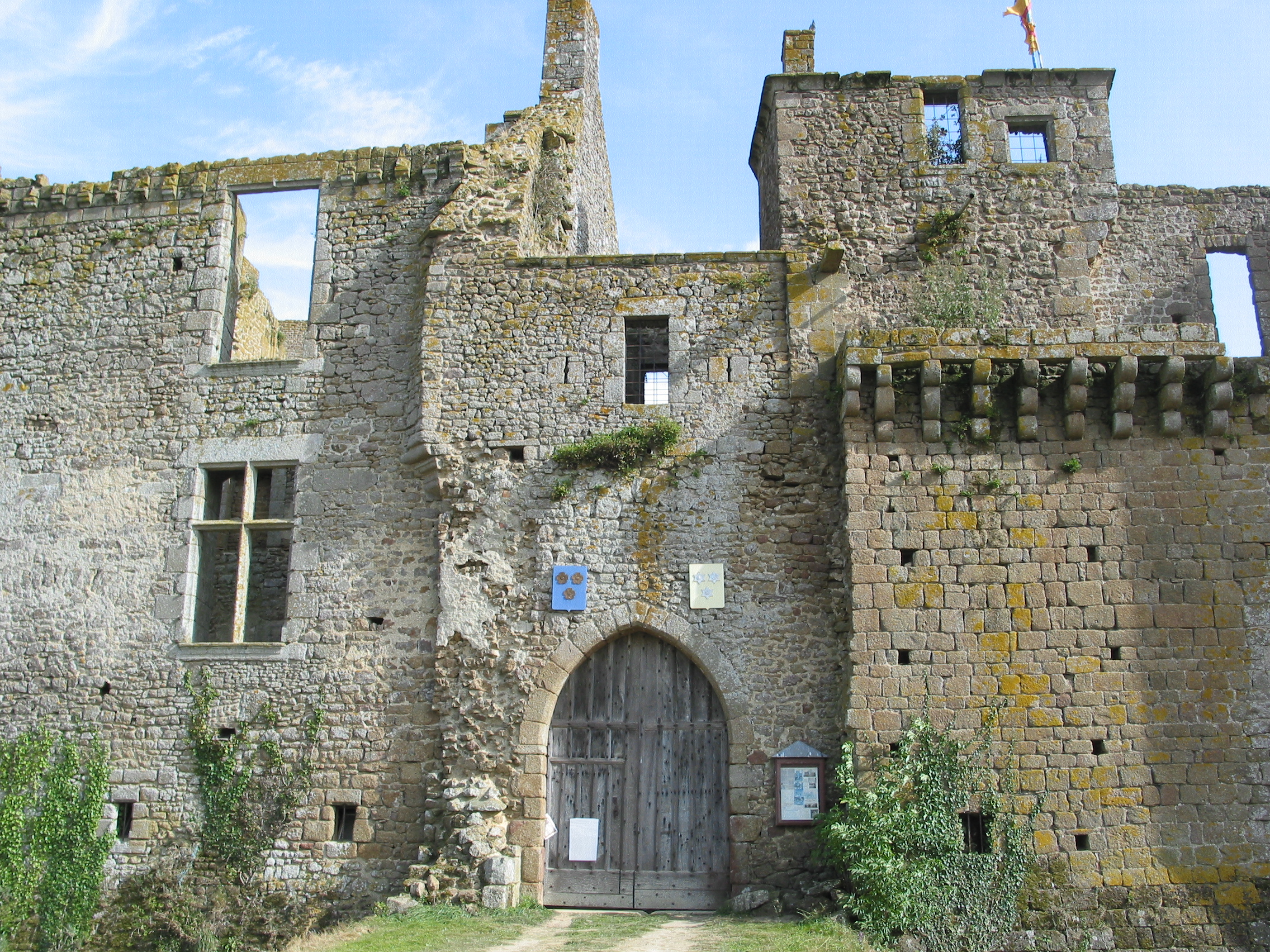
Entrance, showing 16th-century addition at right

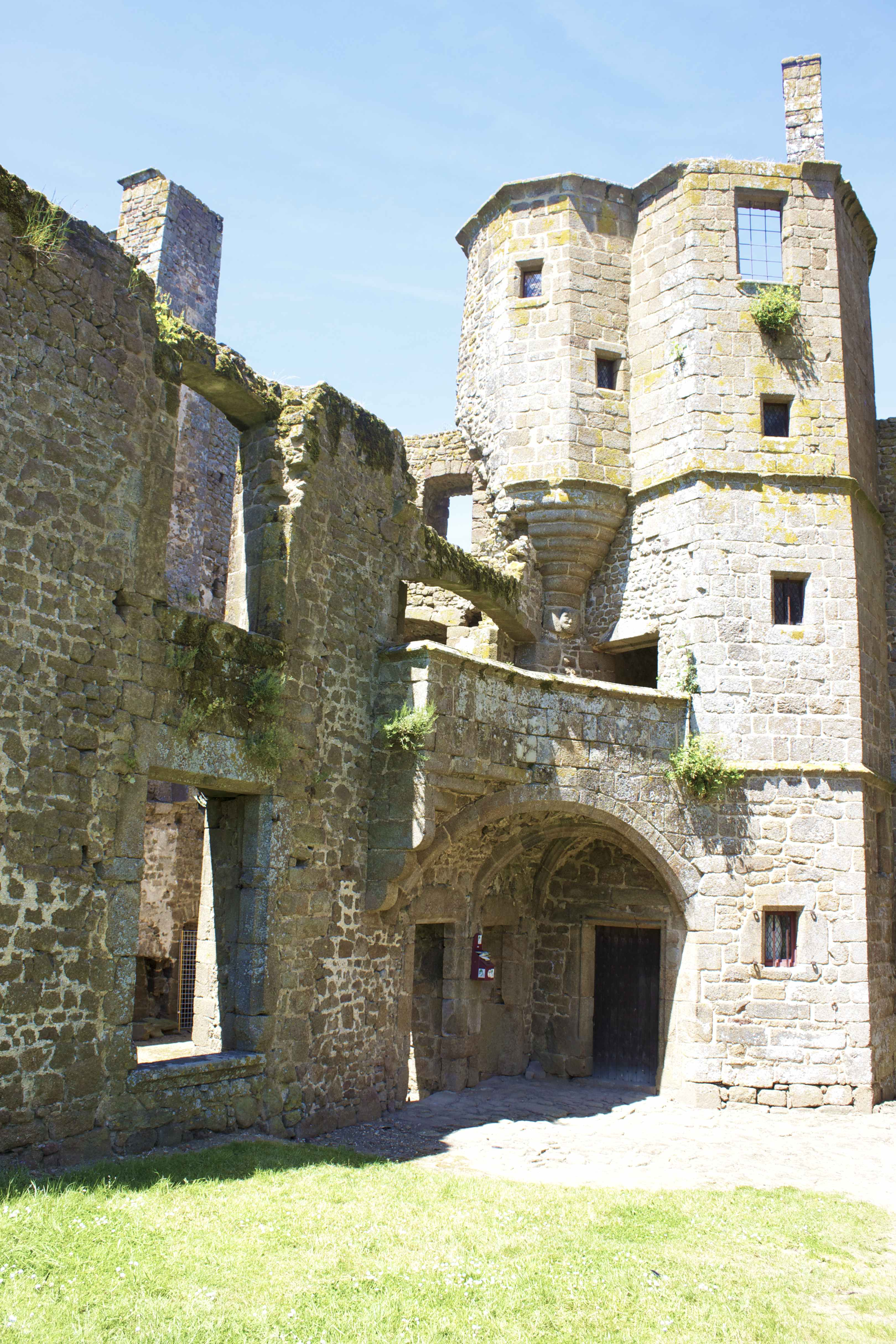
Château du Bois Thibault

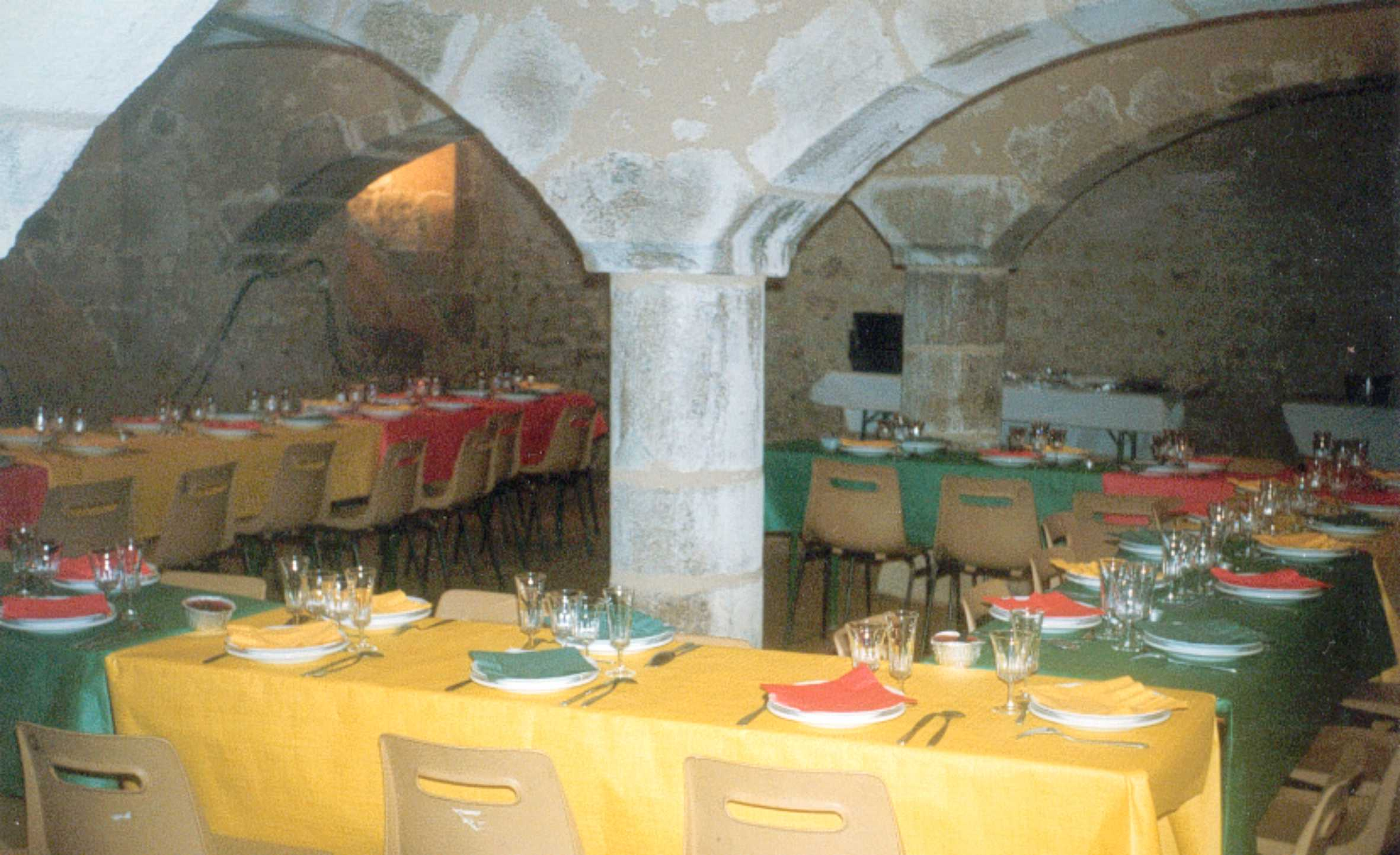
Party held in vaulted cellar

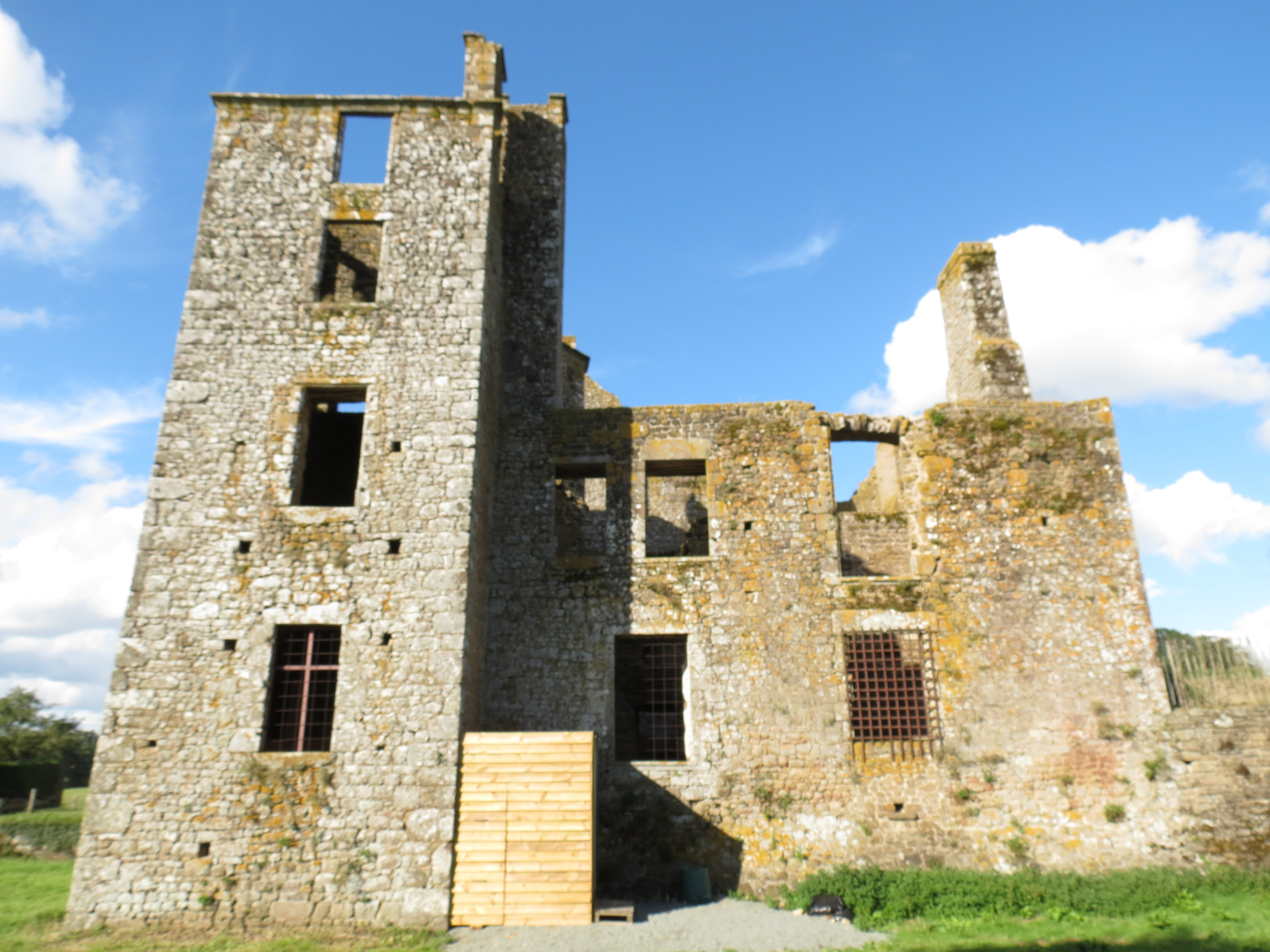
Château du Bois Thibault

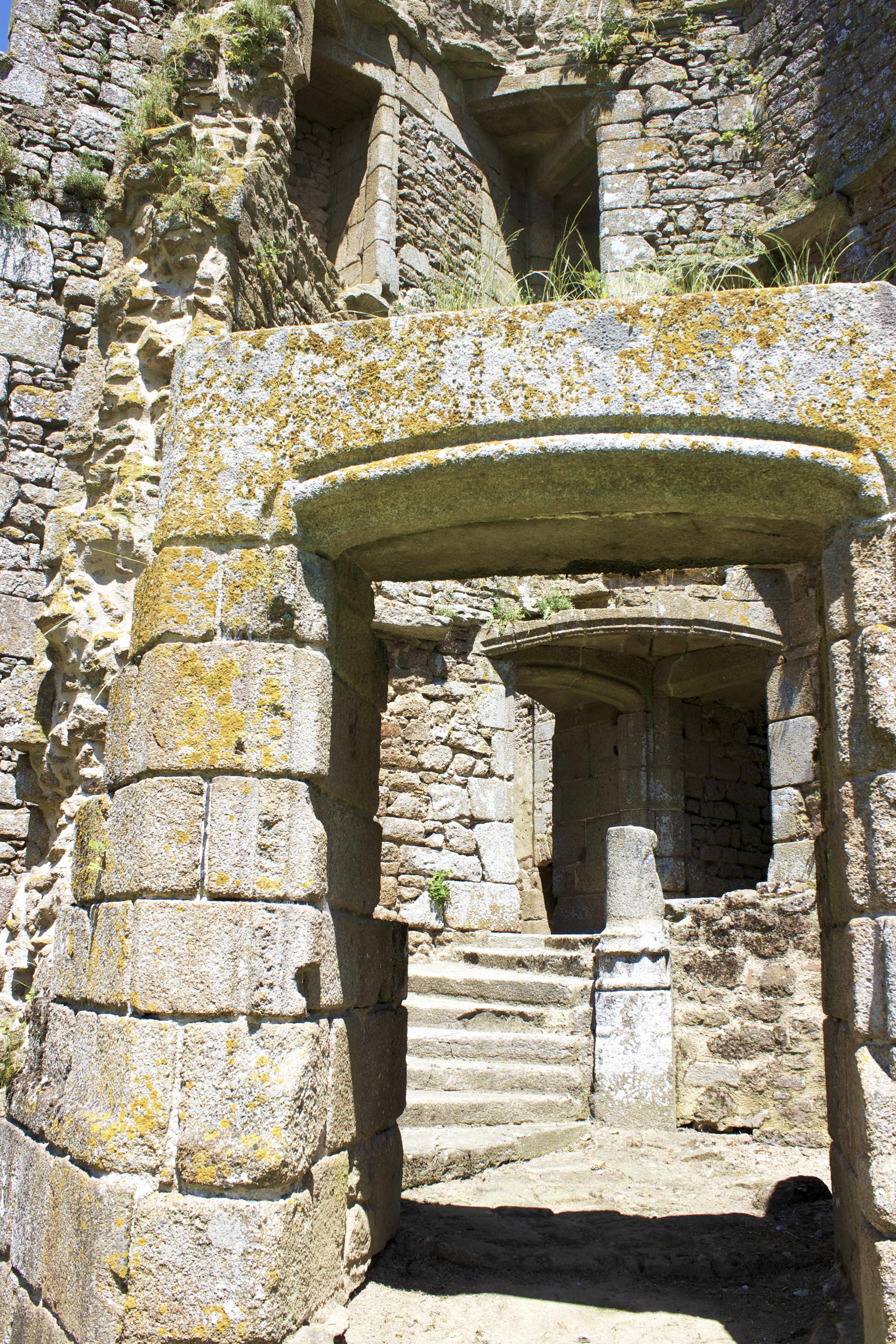
Interior door

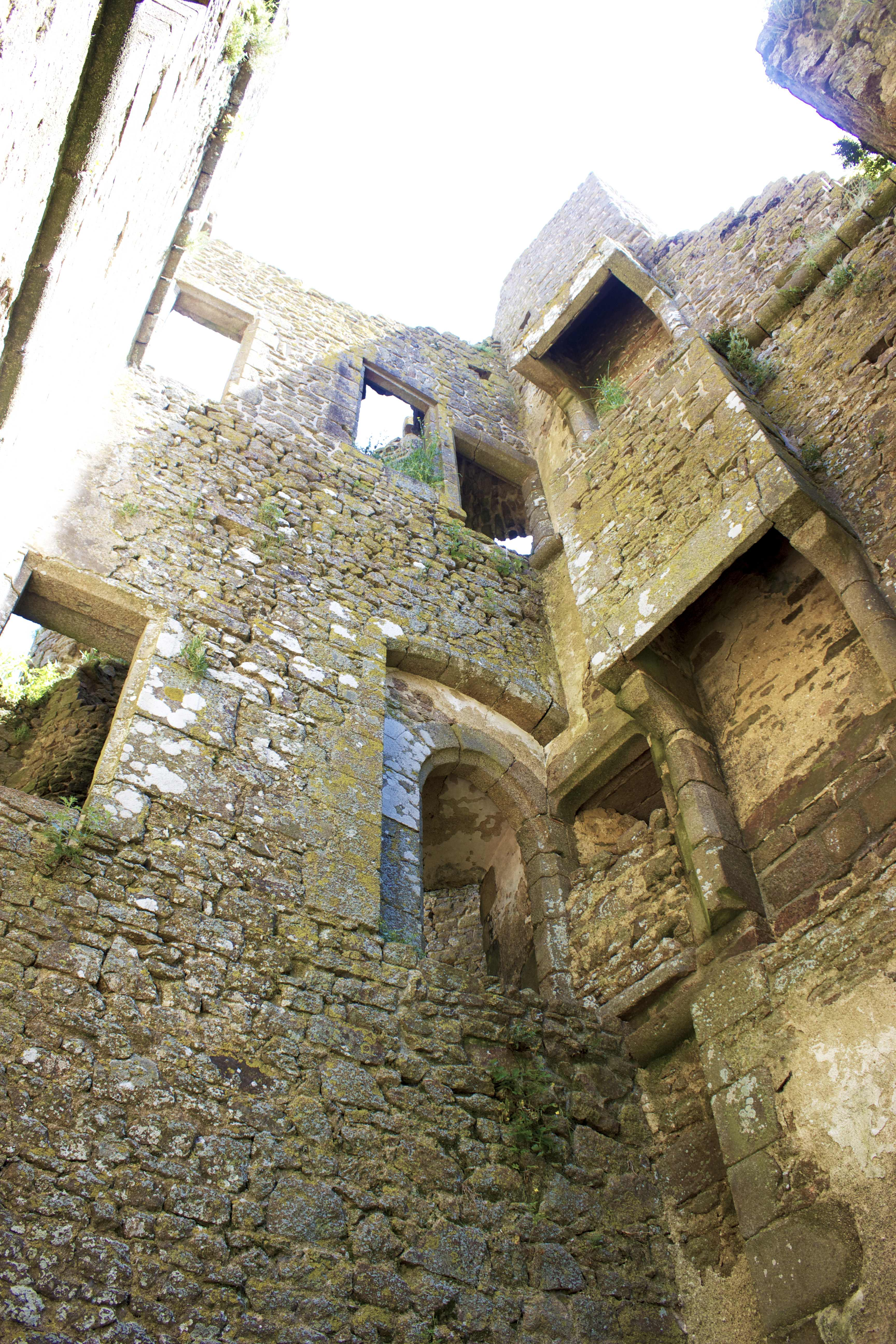
Interior

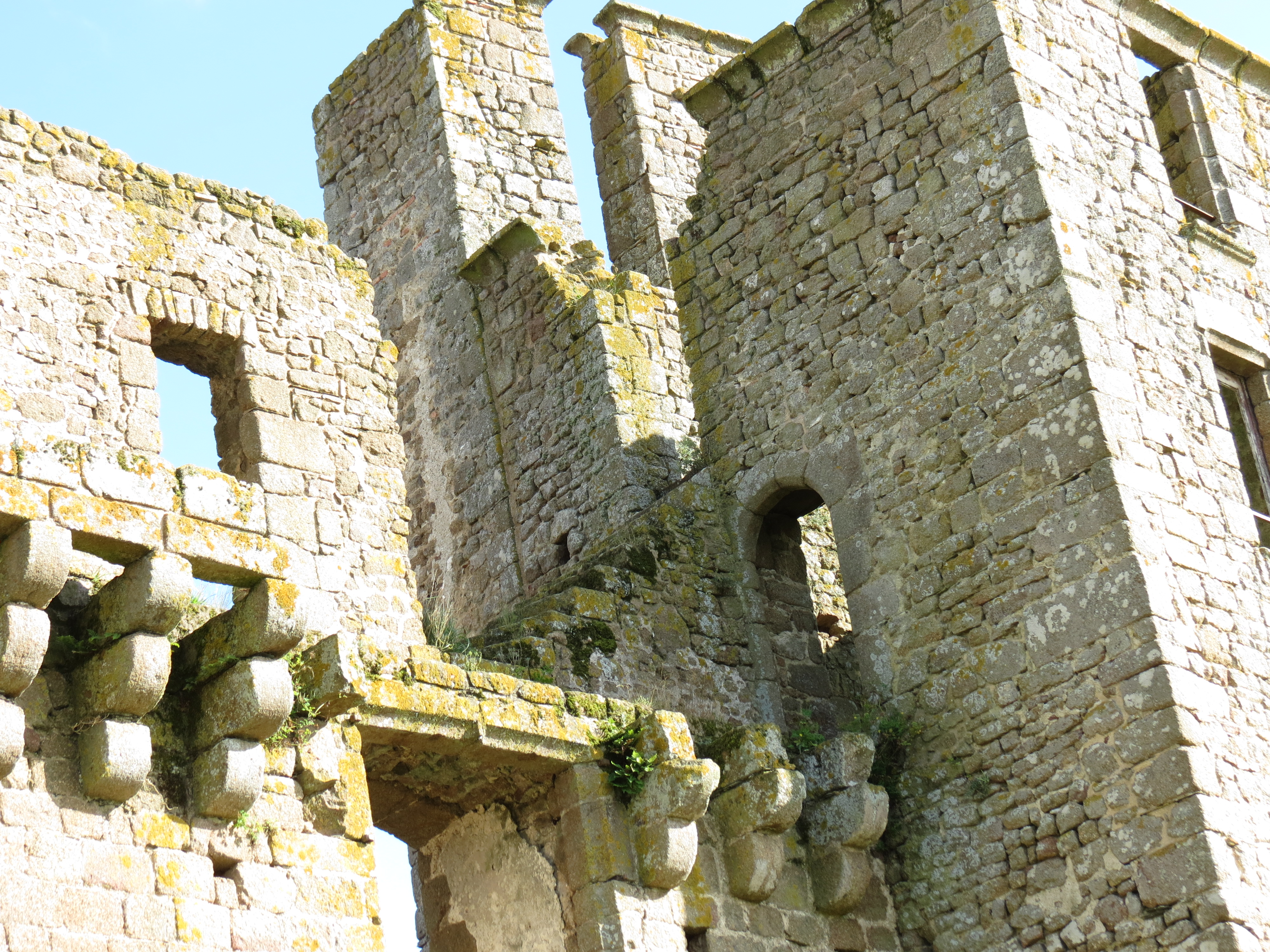
Castle detail

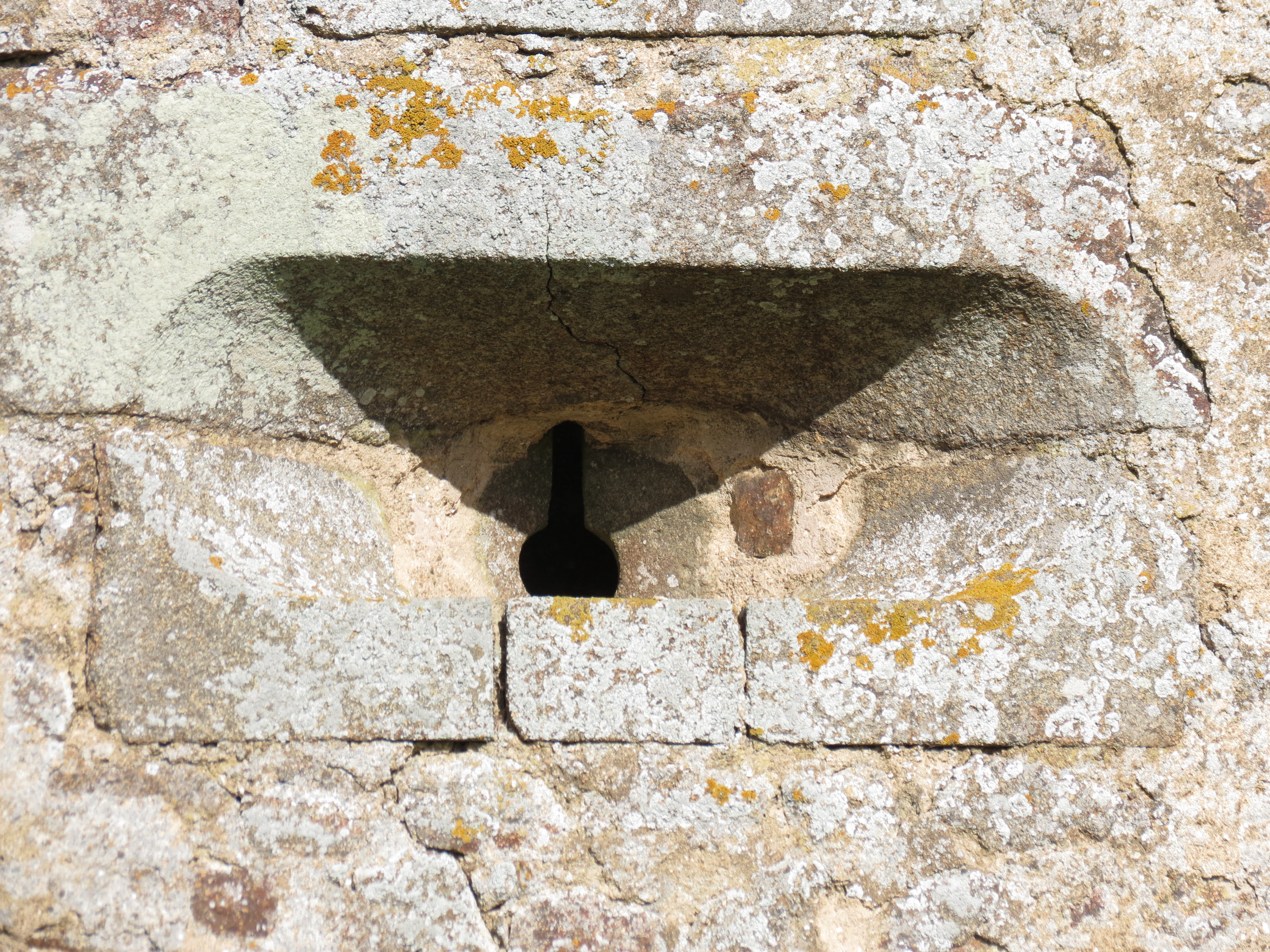
Embrasure

== See also ==
- Château de Lassay
- List of castles in the Pays de la Loire
