= Château de Pouzauges =

Castle ruins in Pays de la Loire, France

Coordinates: 46°47′07″N 0°50′23″W

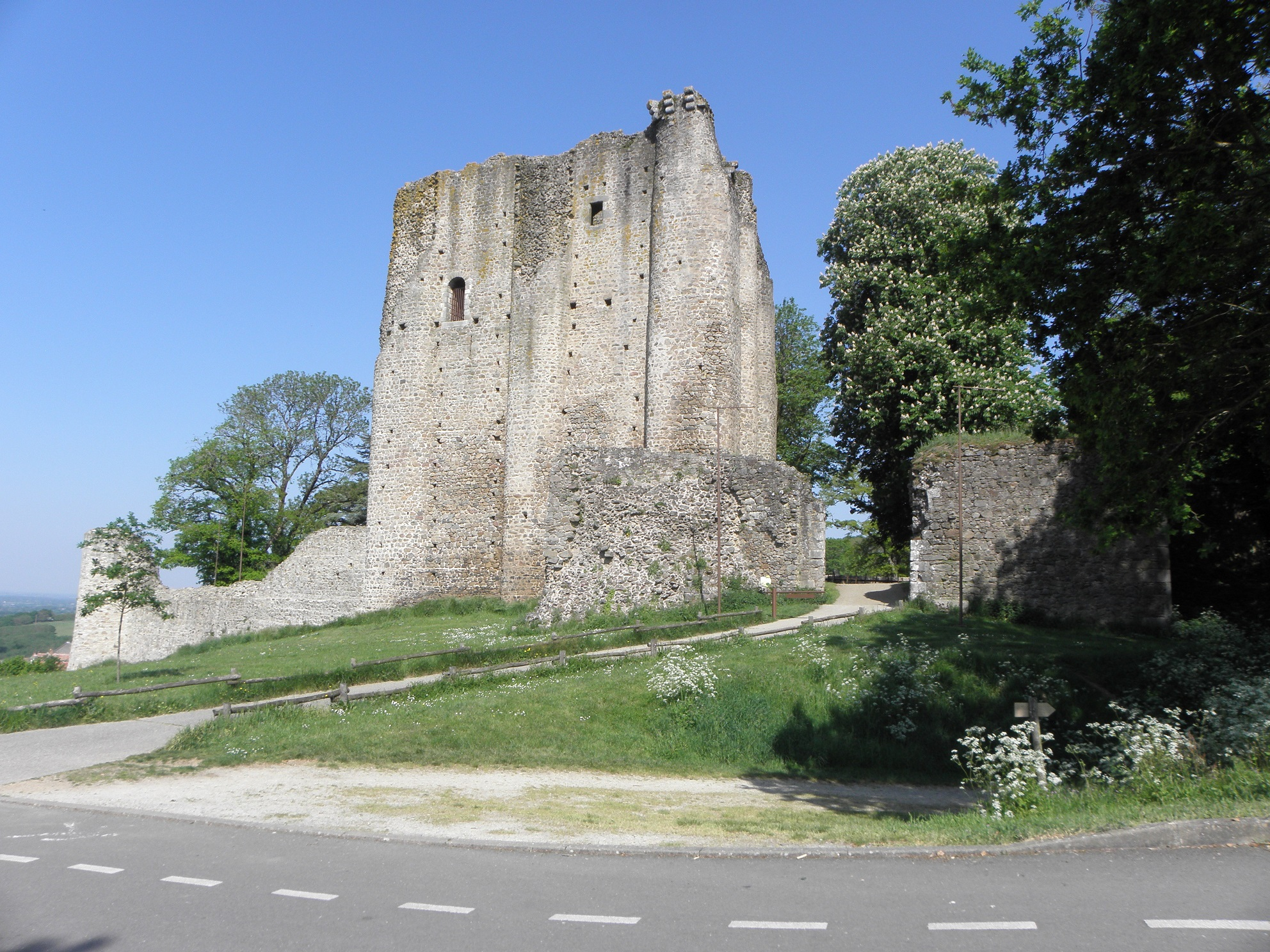
Château de Pouzauges

The Château de Pouzauges is a ruined castle in the town and commune of Pouzauges in the Vendée département of France.

Notably, it was inhabited in the 15th century by Catherine de Thouars, wife of Gilles de Rais (c. 1405 – 1440), though he never lived there, preferring the Château de Tiffauges.

== History ==
In the 11th century, the castle belonged to the family of Zacharie de Pouzauges, from who it passed it to the enigmatic Chantemerle family and then to the famous Savary family of Mauléon and finally to the Viscounts of Thouars, who administered nearly the whole of Vendée; they gave the castle to a cadet son who also owned Tiffauges.

Catherine de Thouars brought the castle into the possession of Gilles de Rais thanks to their marriage. She was going to live there after his death. Under the aegis of Catherine, the keep underwent many alterations to make it more comfortable as a residence. A new floor was added as well as a spiral staircase linking it to all the others. Several windows were made, replacing the older arrowslits, to give more light to the interior.

The castle was sold in 1634 to the lord of La Pélissonnière au Boupère. His descendants kept it until the mid-20th century.

During the War in the Vendée (1793-1794), the men of the "infernal columns" commanded by General Lachenay shot 31 inhabitants of Pouzauges who had taken refuge in the enceinte of the old castle. This act was committed on 26 January 1794 at the end of a banquet offered by the republican to General Grignon. On the same day, the surrounding villages were burnt and a number of inhabitants were massacred.

== Architecture ==
The castle ruins are dominated by its majestic 12th century keep.

The keep, more than 25 metres high, is one of twelve towers that make the curtain wall, offering visitors a fine example of civil Romanesque architecture.

It has been listed since 1862 as a monument historique by the French Ministry of Culture.

== See also ==
- List of castles in France
