= Savaric =

Savaric may refer to:

- Savaric of Auxerre, bishop of Auxerre
- Savaric FitzGeldewin, bishop of Bath and Wells
- Savari de Mauléon or Savaric de Malleo, 13th century soldier and troubadour

== See also ==
- Savary (disambiguation)
