= Pouzauges =

- Commune
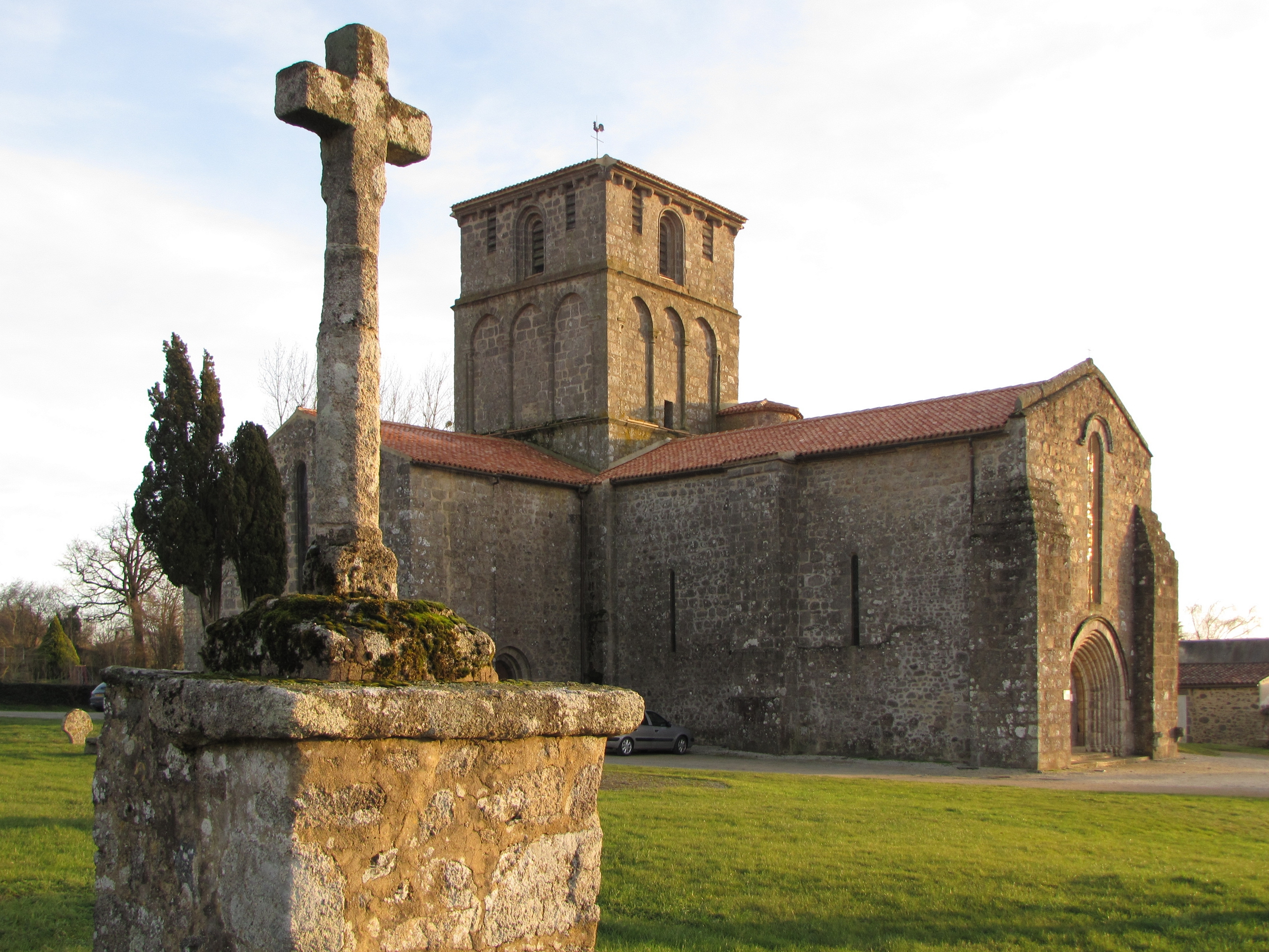
- The church of Our Lady

- Coat of arms
- Location of Pouzauges
- Location within France Location within Pays de la Loire
- Coordinates: 46°46′59″N 0°50′10″W
- Country: France
- Region: Pays de la Loire
- Department: Vendée
- Arrondissement: Fontenay-le-Comte
- Canton: Les Herbiers
- Intercommunality: Pays de Pouzauges

Government
  - Mayor (2020–2026): Michelle Devanne
- Area^{1}: 36.65 km^{2} (14.15 sq mi)
- Highest elevation: 280 m (920 ft)
- Lowest elevation: 92 m (302 ft)
- Population (2023): 5,668
  - Density: 154.7/km^{2} (400.5/sq mi)
- Time zone: UTC+01:00 (CET)
  - Summer (DST): UTC+02:00 (CEST)
- INSEE/Postal code: 85182 /85700
- ^{1} French Land Register data, which excludes lakes, ponds, glaciers > 1 km^{2} (0.386 sq mi or 247 acres) and river estuaries.

Pouzauges (French pronunciation: [puzoʒ]) is a commune in the Vendée département in the Pays de la Loire region in western France.

== Geography ==
The river Lay forms most of the commune's southern border.

== Population ==
Historical population
Year	Pop.	±% p.a.
1968	4,832	—
1975	5,506	+1.88%
1982	5,699	+0.49%
1990	5,473	−0.50%
1999	5,385	−0.18%
2007	5,362	−0.05%
2012	5,547	+0.68%
2017	5,514	−0.12%
2023	5,668	+0.46%
Source: INSEE

== Sights and monuments ==
- The Château de Pouzauges is a ruined 12th century castle.

== International relations ==
The commune is twinned with the English town of Eye in Suffolk. A French road sign showing the distance to Pouzauges was gifted to the town of Eye to commemorate the twinning.

== See also ==
- Communes of the Vendée department
