= Alphonse-Victor Angot =

French historian (1844–1917)

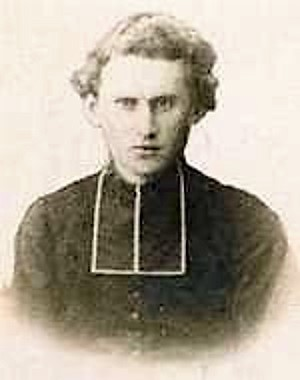
- Alphonse-Victor Angot in 1868
- Born: 10 February 1844; Montsûrs
- Died: 10 June 1917 (aged 73); Saint-Fraimbault de Lassay
- Resting place: Saint-Fraimbault de Lassay
- Other name: l'abbé Angot
- Occupations: Catholic Priest, Historian

Alphonse-Victor Angot, or l'abbé Angot (English: /ˈæŋɡoʊ/ ANG-oh, French: [alfɔ̃s viktɔʁ ɑ̃ɡo]; 10 February 1844 – 10 June 1917), was a French historian who specialized in the history of Mayenne (département).

== Origins ==
Angot was born in Montsûrs. At age eleven, he entered a small seminary in Précigné. His mother was a lodger with the Augustines in Baugé and an aunt lived among them. In 1863 he returned to the grand seminary. He died in Saint-Fraimbault de Lassay.
