= Du Bellay family =

French noble family

du Bellay
- Origin: Anjou, France
- Estate: Château du Bellay

The du Bellay family is a French noble family from the historic Anjou region. Their origins go back to the twelfth century and they lend their name from the grounds of the château du Bellay in Allonnes (Maine-et-Loire department).

Notable members of the family include:

- Jean du Bellay (c. 1493–1560), cardinal and diplomat
- Guillaume du Bellay (1491–1543), writer and general
- Joachim du Bellay (c. 1522–1560), poet
- Martin du Bellay (1495–1559), chronicler
