= Château de Pornic =

French castle

Coordinates: 47°06′50″N 2°06′20″W

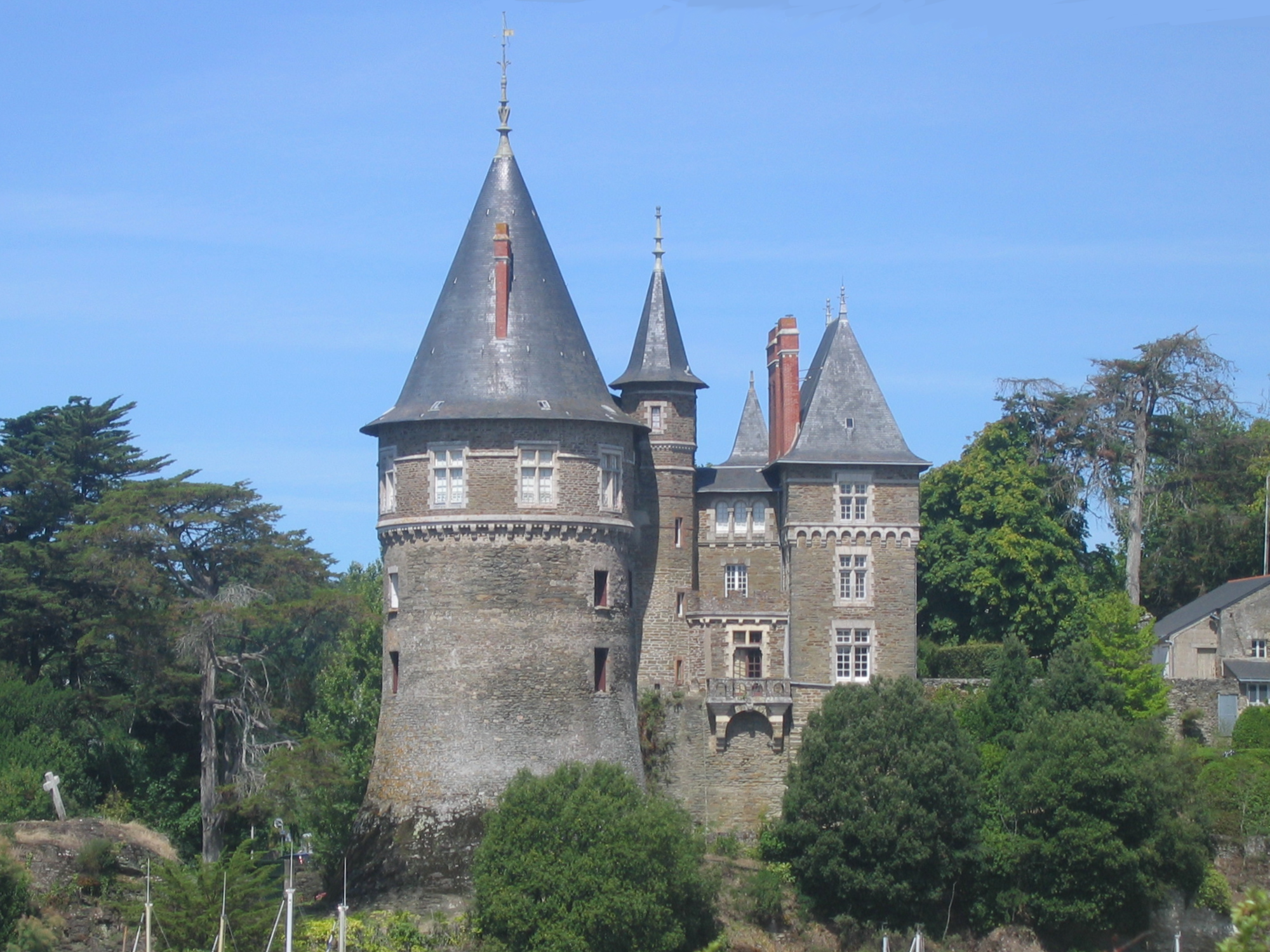

The Château de Pornic is a restored castle in the commune of Pornic in the Loire-Atlantique département of France, 50 km from Nantes. It is also known as the "Château de Barbe Bleue" (Bluebeard) because it belonged to Gilles de Rais.

== Description ==
Situated in the port of Pornic, the castle has long been a symbol of the town. The castle is privately owned and not open to the public.

== History ==
The castle is bordered on one side by the sea and is constructed on a defensive site. In the Middle Ages, it provided for the defence of the port.

- In the 10th century, Alan Wrybeard, Duke of Brittany, built and fortified a wooden castle. It was occupied by a garrison who protected the entrance to Pornic.
- In the 12th century, it was the property of the Lords of Rais who rebuilt it in stone.
- In the 15th century, it belonged to Gilles de Rais but was confiscated by John V, Duke of Brittany at the time of Gilles' trial.
- In the 18th century, it belonged to Marquis de Brie Serrant whose properties were confiscated during the French Revolution. The castle fell into ruin.
- The castle was bought at the end of the 19th century by Monsieur Lebreton, founder of the seawater baths, and restored by the architect François Bougoüin who gave it its present appearance with its fully arched windows dressed in brick in the style of the Italian architecture of the Château de Clisson.

The towers and remains of the curtain walls, with the exception of the parts restored in the 19th century, and the access ramps have been listed since 1986 as a monument historique by the French Ministry of Culture.

== See also ==
- List of castles in France
