= Lassay-les-Châteaux =

- Commune
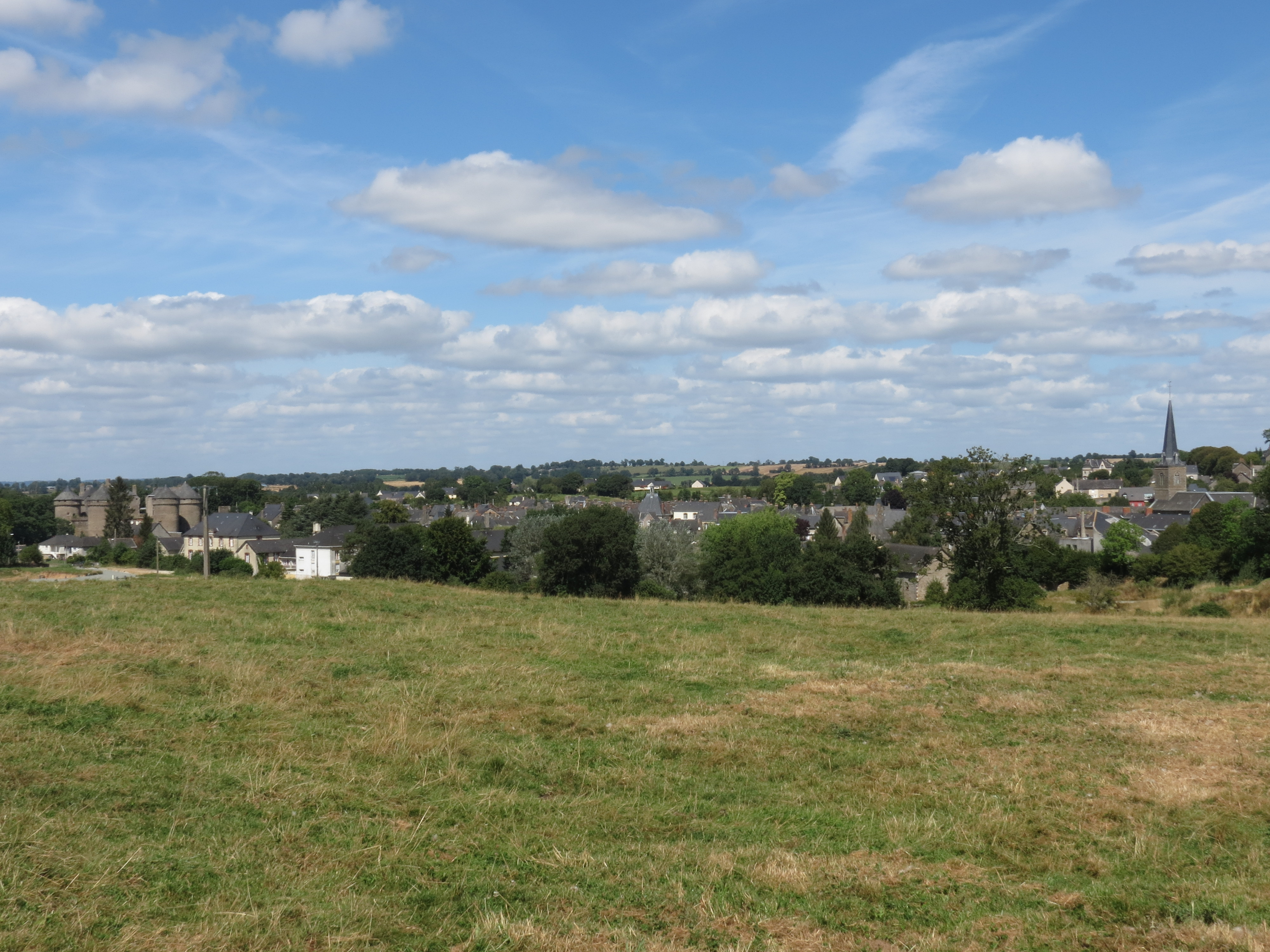
- View of Lassay-les-Châteaux. The medieval castle is visible on the left.

- Coat of arms
- Location of Lassay-les-Châteaux
- Location within France Location within Pays de la Loire
- Coordinates: 48°26′18″N 0°29′40″W
- Country: France
- Region: Pays de la Loire
- Department: Mayenne
- Arrondissement: Mayenne
- Canton: Lassay-les-Châteaux

Government
  - Mayor (2020–2026): Jean Raillard
- Area^{1}: 57.63 km^{2} (22.25 sq mi)
- Elevation: 205 m (673 ft)
- Highest elevation: 270 m (890 ft)
- Lowest elevation: 98 m (322 ft)
- Population (2023): 2,247
  - Density: 38.99/km^{2} (101.0/sq mi)
- Time zone: UTC+01:00 (CET)
  - Summer (DST): UTC+02:00 (CEST)
- INSEE/Postal code: 53127 /53110
- ^{1} French Land Register data, which excludes lakes, ponds, glaciers > 1 km^{2} (0.386 sq mi or 247 acres) and river estuaries.

Lassay-les-Châteaux (French pronunciation: [lasɛ le ʃɑto]) is a commune in the Mayenne department in north-western France. It was created in 1973 by the merger of three former communes: Lassay, La Baroche-Gondouin and Melleray-la-Vallée.

== History ==
Lassay-les-Châteaux is classified as a Petites Cités de Caractère, or Small City of Character. The small town of character label is awarded to small municipalities boasting a high-quality, coherent architectural heritage, and undertake to preserve their heritage and promote it to inhabitants and visitors.

The town is named for its three chateaux, or Castles: Château de Lassay, Château du Bois Thibault and Château Bois Frou. Château de Lassay has eight substantial towers and is largely intact, although restoration work continues on the structure; the ruins of Château du Bois Thibault are substantial, comprising two round towers and the accommodation building; while little remains of Château Bois Frou, other than a large stone gateway, portions of two towers and a small segment of wall.

Lassay castle fort, built in the 14th and 15th centuries, is classified as an Historic Monument and is an intact example of medieval military architecture, incorporating a two-storey barbican, small castle, eight round towers and curtain walls with Machicolations. It is scenically situated next to one of the town's two Ponds. A medieval garden recreated by local volunteers is connected to the building. An adjacent chapel and the Murals it contains are also classified as Historic Monuments. The Lassay chateau was built on the site of a previous, 12th-century castle that was demolished during the Hundred Years War. It belongs to the Montalembert family who are gradually restoring it, and is open to the public during the summer.

Château de Lassay received historical monument classification in 1862. It has been open to visitors since the 1930s, although it was closed for a period during and after World War II.

The castle was seriously damaged during the Second World War. Initially, it was looted in 1940 by refugees fleeing the German Blitzkrieg. Later, the German occupiers further damaged the buildings, which remained deserted until Pierre de Montalembert opened the chateau to the public in the 1950s. The current comte and comtesse Aymeri de Montalembert are committed to restoring and preserving their ancestral home. Four of the eight towers have been restored since 2014, but the roofs of the remaining four towers are in fragile condition and need significant work. Work to consolidate the slope supporting one tower has also uncovered deterioration and disintegration of the rock on which the chateau stands, largely due to the effects of water and tree roots. Work will be needed to stabilise the base on which the chateau stands.

Also listed as an Historic Monument, the Château du Bois Thibault is constructed on the old foundations of the fortress of Foulques Nerra, dating from the 11th century. Remaining remnants include portions of a square building and two round towers. Guided tours are organised during the summer, and activities such as treasure hunts are held each year at the ruins of the chateau.

The Historic Monument-listed Benedictine Convent has an adjacent rose garden whose more than 300 varieties of Roses attract many visitors, and a restored, four-part medieval garden comprising a herb garden, orchard, copse and green carpet.

Saint Fraimbault, saint evangelizer of Maine in the 6th century, is buried in Lassay-les-Châteaux.

== Geography ==
The commune is made up of the following collection of villages and hamlets, La Baroche-Gondouin, La Gasnerie, La Pelleterie, Melleray-la-Vallée, Monfoucault, Commerson, Le Bois Frou, Le Vieux Mont, Niort la Fontaine, Lassay-les-Châteaux, Les Chauvières, Lassay, Le Bois Jacob, La Sourderie, La Pesière, La Barberie, Le Romé and Courberie.

The commune is located within the Normandie-Maine Regional Natural Park.

The Normandy-Maine Regional Nature Park attracts nature enthusiasts and outdoor adventurers to its wooded hills, rocky cliffs, steep river valleys and patchwork of farmland meadows defined by hedgerows. Visitors are attracted to the nature park's beauty and also to activities such as hiking, horse riding, mountain biking, canoeing and kayaking, and fishing.

It is located in the gently rolling landscape of the department of Mayenne, which forms part of the region of Pays de la Loire and close to the border of Normandy.

It covers an area of 57.63 km^{2} (5,763 hectares), and has an altitude that ranges from 98 metres to 270 metres above sea level. Lassay-les-Châteaux is 90 kilometres from Le Mans and 50 kilometres from the historic town of Laval which is the chief town of Mayenne. The nearest larger town is Mayenne, 17 km to the southwest.

== Population ==
Population data refer to the area corresponding with the commune as of January 2025.

Historical population
Year	Pop.	±% p.a.
1968	2,783	—
1975	2,602	−0.96%
1982	2,595	−0.04%
1990	2,459	−0.67%
1999	2,532	+0.33%
2007	2,439	−0.47%
2012	2,390	−0.41%
2017	2,253	−1.17%
2023	2,247	−0.04%
Source: INSEE

== Architecture ==
The buildings in Lassay-les-Châteaux are largely built from local granite with shingle roofs. Many homes have colourful Window shutters and there is a traditional town square with colourful hanging flower baskets. The town is named for the one intact chateau and ruins of two others. The village also has a number of historic stone Lavoirs – or washhouses – along the banks of the Lassay River.

Lassay-les-Châteaux has a number of religious buildings. They include the Benedictine convent that is listed as an Historic Monument; the nearby church of Saint Fraimbault; the Church of St. Lawrence of La Baroche-Gondouin, a Romanesque-style church that was constructed in the latter half of the 19th century on the location of a much older building. Others include the Saint-Médard church, also built in the 19th century; the Saint-Joseph chapel, built in the 17th century; and the chapels of Saint-Mathieu and Saint-Roch.

== Culture ==
Impressionist painter Camille Pissarro stayed in Lassay-les-Châteaux on a number of occasions and painted "Moisson à Montfoucault," during one of his visits. The Pissarro-Piette trail guides visitors in the footsteps of the artist and his friends.

A number of Festivals and arts events are held in the town throughout the year, but primarily in the summer months. The castle itself also hosts events such as medieval, aerial and musical festivals, theatre productions and Concerts, candlelight tours and battle re-enactments.

On the first weekend of June each year, the Painters in the Streets event is held. Visitors and locals can explore open-air Exhibitions and watch artists creating their works. A number of events are scheduled each July. They include Les Entrelacés, a festival of street arts, two Arthurian-themed treasure hunts at the Château du Bois Thibault, and a painting exhibition. A photography contest is held in August. In summer, the inhabitants of Lassay-les-Châteaux also dress up and offer dramatised walks of the village. These usually occur in July and August.

On the second Sunday of December, the non-profit Association Culturelle Lassay-les-Châteaux hosts Moment d'Hiver, or Winter Moment, offering free entertainment for children and a meal for Parents. The event includes traditional seasonal fare such as Oysters and grilled Chestnuts, and activities including carriage rides.

Sporting facilities in Lassay include a sports hall, Tennis courts and an outdoor swimming pool that is open seasonally.

The European Union has committed almost €200,000 to the restoration of the Château de Lassay, which has a total budget of €816,751.22. EU funding includes contributions to restoration of the large gatehouse, renovation of both drawbridges, safety upgrades to the barbican, and acquisitions of equipment such as a platform and seating stands. The contributions are designed to enhance the development and use of the barbican for “cultural, historical and sporting activities within an exceptional setting,” and thereby increase the tourist appeal of the town of Lassay-les-Châteaux.

== Economy ==
Lassay-les-Châteaux is a market town and the market is held once a week on Wednesday mornings. A Christmas market is held every December.

The town has a Post office, two Supermarkets, Banks, bars and Restaurants, a hairdresser, two boulangeries and a boucherie, and a tourist office.

== Points of interest ==
=== Gardens ===
- Roseraie de Lassay-les-Châteaux - is a 3,000 m² public park, featuring over 300 varieties of Roses. It was opened in 1990 and was designed by the architect Thierry Jourd'heuil.
- Le jardin médiéval is a one hectare Botanical garden that was designed by the architect Thierry Jourd'heuil and opened in 2001. It is based on what was grown in Medieval times.
- La forêt nourricière du Val des Ecoliers - is a 9,000 m² garden that was created in 2023 dedicated to trees and plants that are used for agroforestry.

=== Museums ===
- Musée du cidre - A museum dedicated to the showcasing of Cider production, that has been open since 1989.

=== National Heritage sites ===
The Commune has a total of 3 buildings and areas listed as a Monument historique:

- Château de Bois-Thibaut - remains of a fifteenth-century castle that was listed as monument historique in 1956.
- Château de Lassay - is a twelfth century castle, that was listed as a monument in 1862.
- Benedictine Convent - is a former convent, that was listed as a monument in 1988.
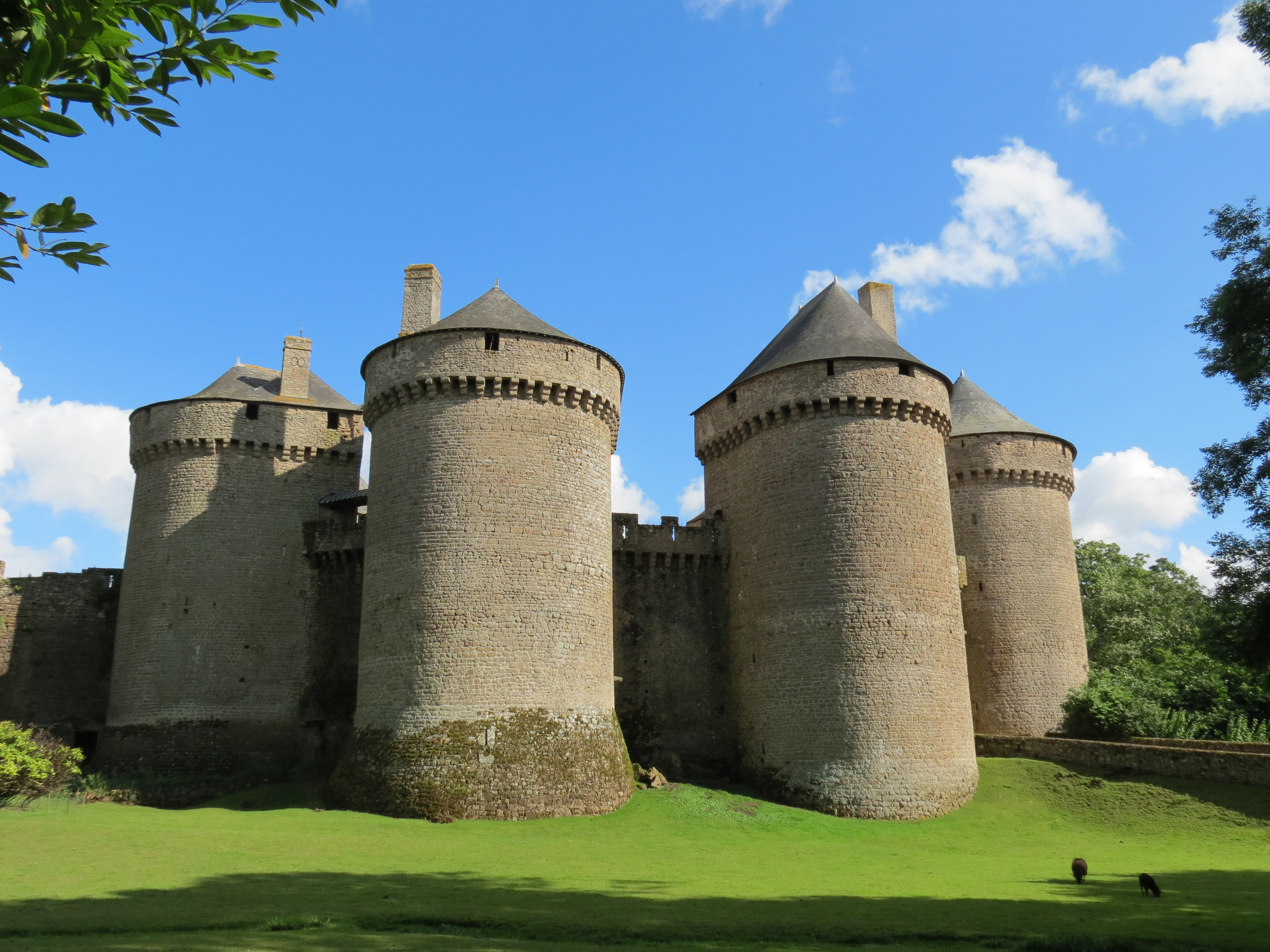
Castle of Lassay.

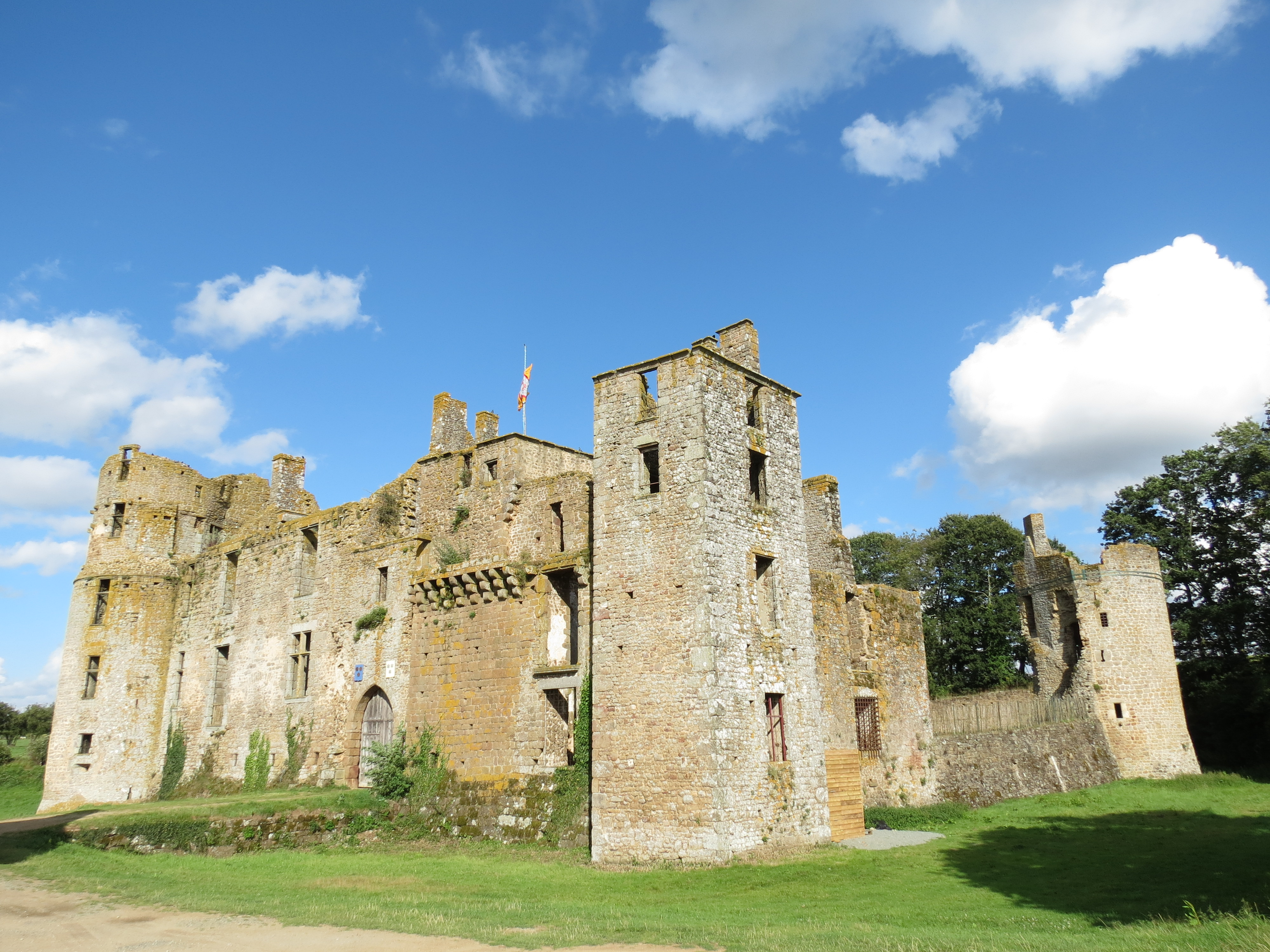
Castle of Bois Thibault.

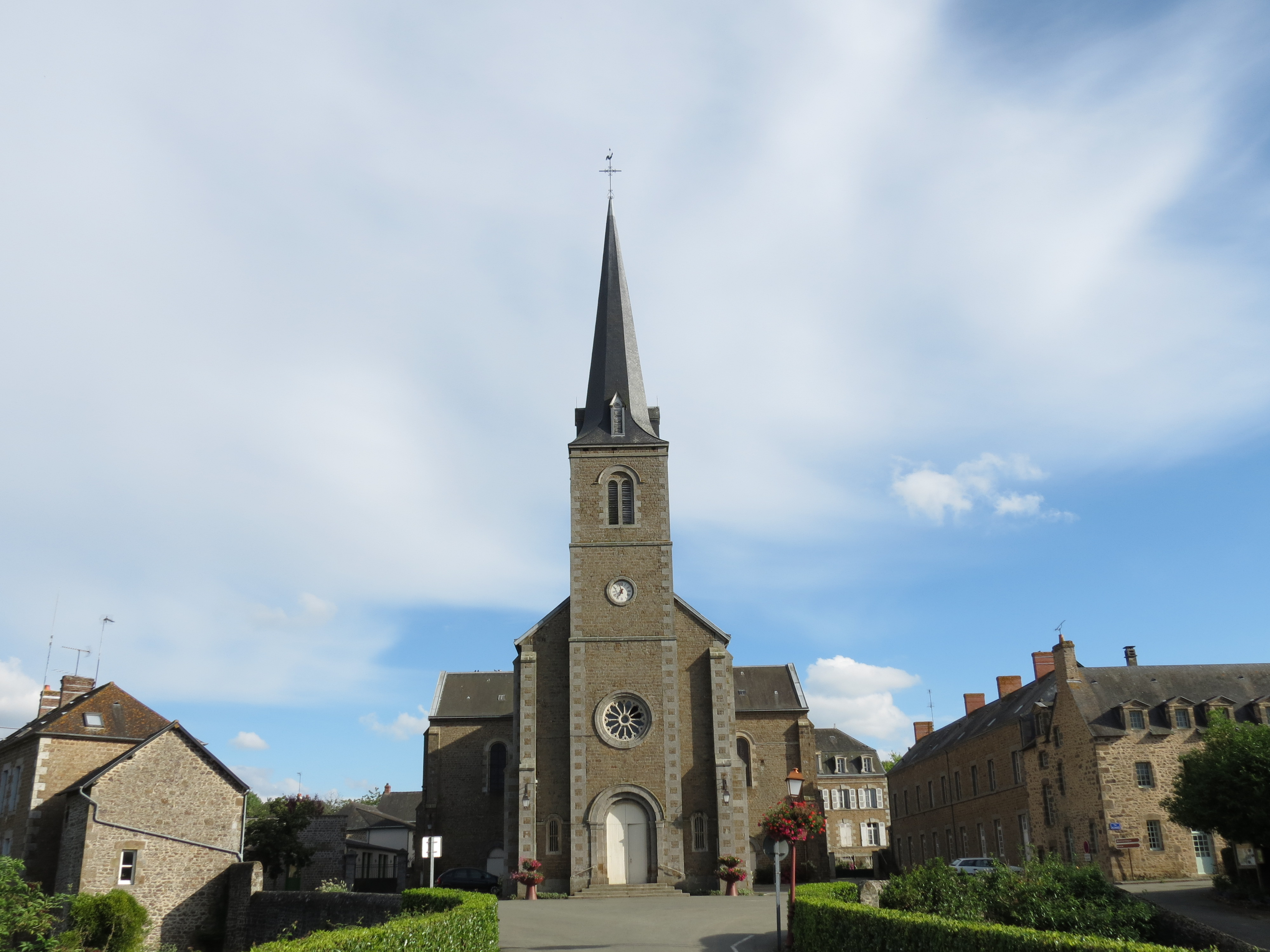
Church.

=== Other sites ===
- Dolmen du Bignon - a Neolithic dolmen that has collapsed.
- Pierre Robert a Neolithic Menhir.

== Notable people ==
- Alphonse-Victor Angot - (1844 – 1917), a historian who specialized in the history of Mayenne died and is buried here.

== See also ==
- Communes of the Mayenne department
- Parc naturel régional Normandie-Maine
