= Château de Careil =

Fortified house in Pays de la Loire, France

Coordinates: 47°17′55″N 2°23′55″W

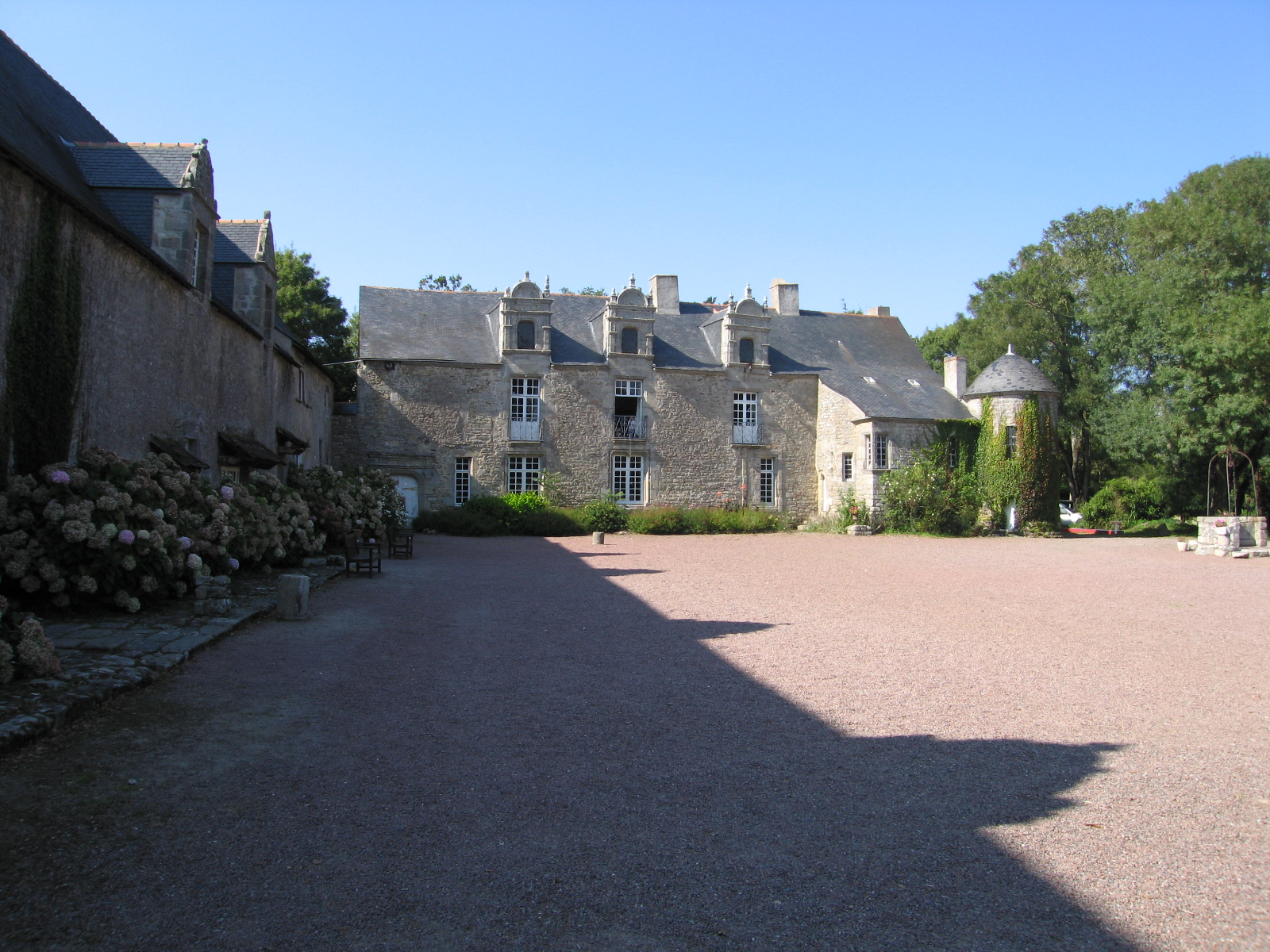

The Château de Careil is a fortified house in the commune of Guérande in the Loire-Atlantique département of France.

== History ==
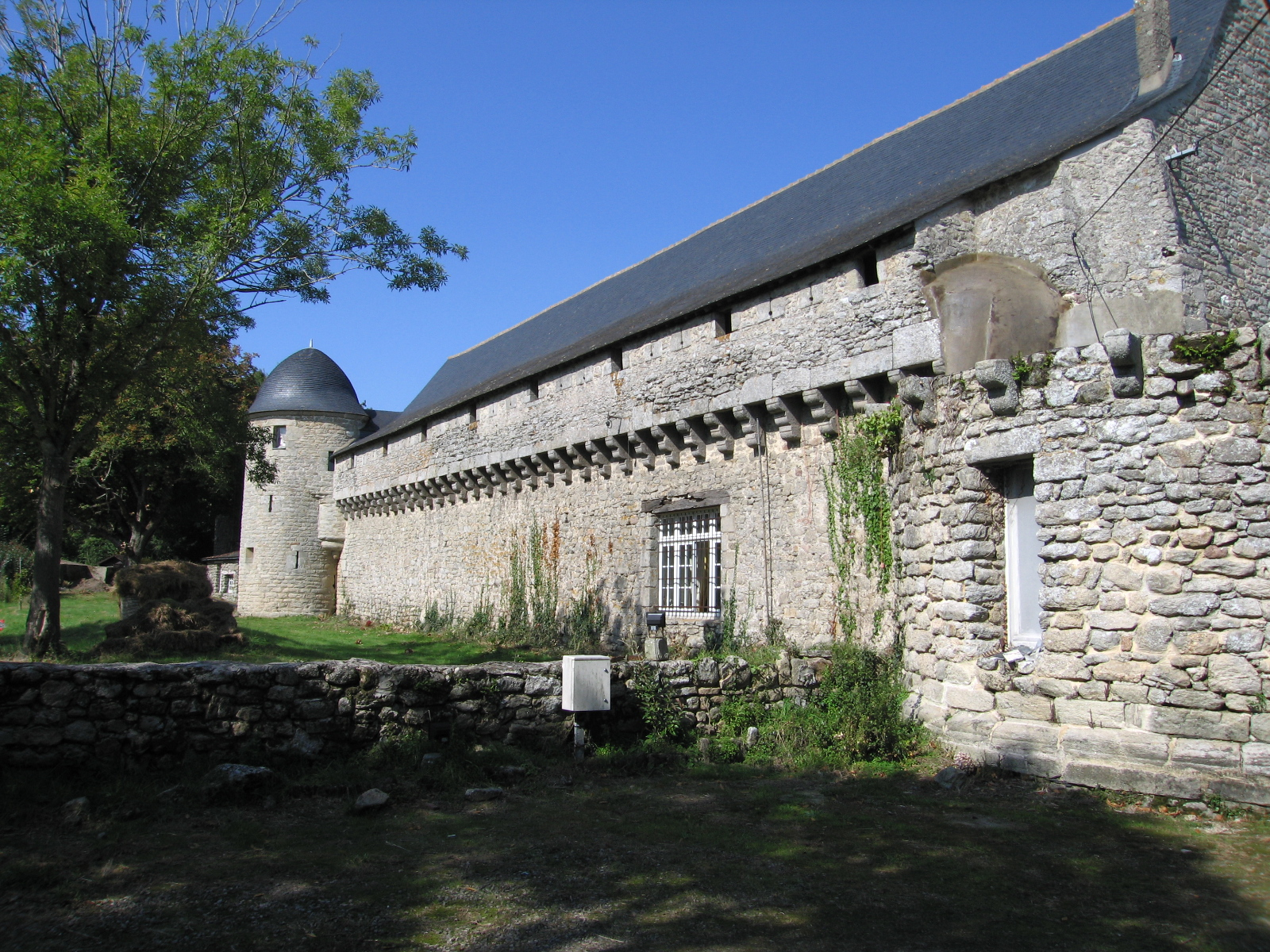
Defensive wall of the castle

Constructed from the end of the 14th century, and enlarged in the 15th and 16th centuries, this manor house had originally a defensive function, as witnessed by the crenellated curtain wall which still exists. Under the Reformation, it served as a place of worship for the Protestants established in the Guérande peninsula. For this reason, it was attacked and pillaged on 11 May 1589 by the Catholic League. In 1699, some time after the Revocation of the Edict of Nantes, the manor was seized and sold to a Catholic family. After becoming a restaurant in 1924, the site is currently a visitors' centre.

A third wing of the building no longer exists; it was destroyed in an accidental fire in the 18th century.

Privately owned, it has been listed since 1925 as a monument historique by the French Ministry of Culture.

== See also ==
- List of castles in France
