= Savary =

Savary is a French surname. Notable people with the surname include:

- Amandine Savary (born 1984), French pianist
- Alain Savary (1918–1988), French Socialist politician
- Alfred William Savary (1831–1920), Nova Scotia member of the 1st Canadian Parliament
- Anne Jean Marie René Savary (1774–1833), French general
- Charlotte Savary (born 1979), French singer
- Claude-Étienne Savary (1750–1788), French orientalist and pioneer of Egyptology
- Daniel Savary (1743–1808), French admiral
- Félix Savary (1797–1841), French mathematician and physicist
- François Savary de Brèves (1560–1627), French ambassador and Orientalist.
- Gilles Savary (born 1954), French politician and Member of the European Parliament
- Jacques Savary (1622–1690), French writer who wrote The Compleat Merchant (first published in 1675)
- Jacques Savary de Lancosme, French ambassador to the Ottoman Porte from 1585 to 1589
- Jérôme Savary (1942–2013), French theater director and actor
- Léon Savary (1895–1968), Swiss French-speaking writer and journalist
- Peter de Savary (1944–2022), English entrepreneur
- Robert Savary, French aircraft designer

== See also ==
- Savary Island, an island in the northern part of the Strait of Georgia
- Societe des Aeroplanes Robert Savary, French pioneer aviation company
