= Château de Lassay =

Castle of France

Castle of Lassay
- Château de Lassay
- Lassay-les-Châteaux, Mayenne.
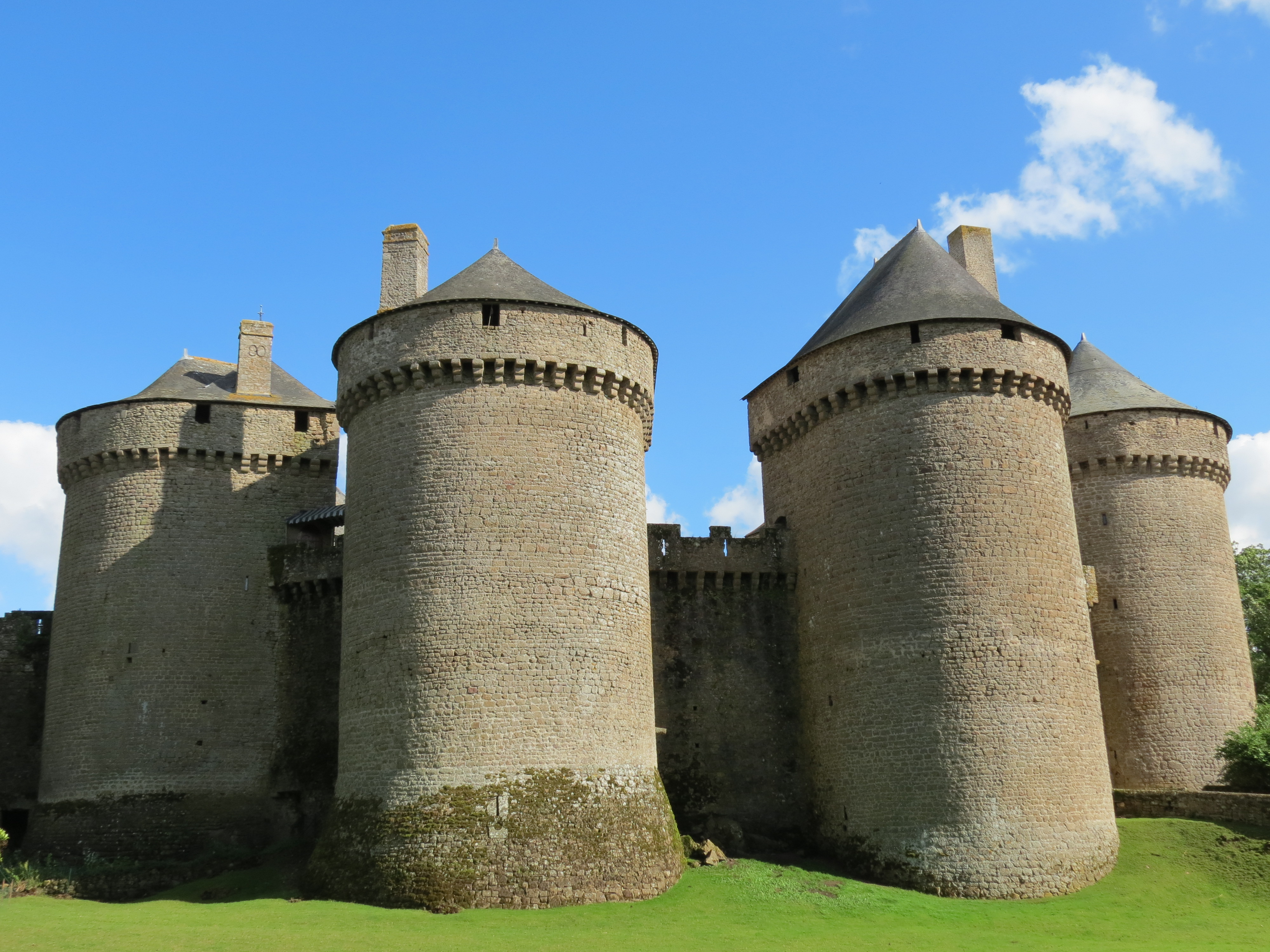
- The castle, view from the park.

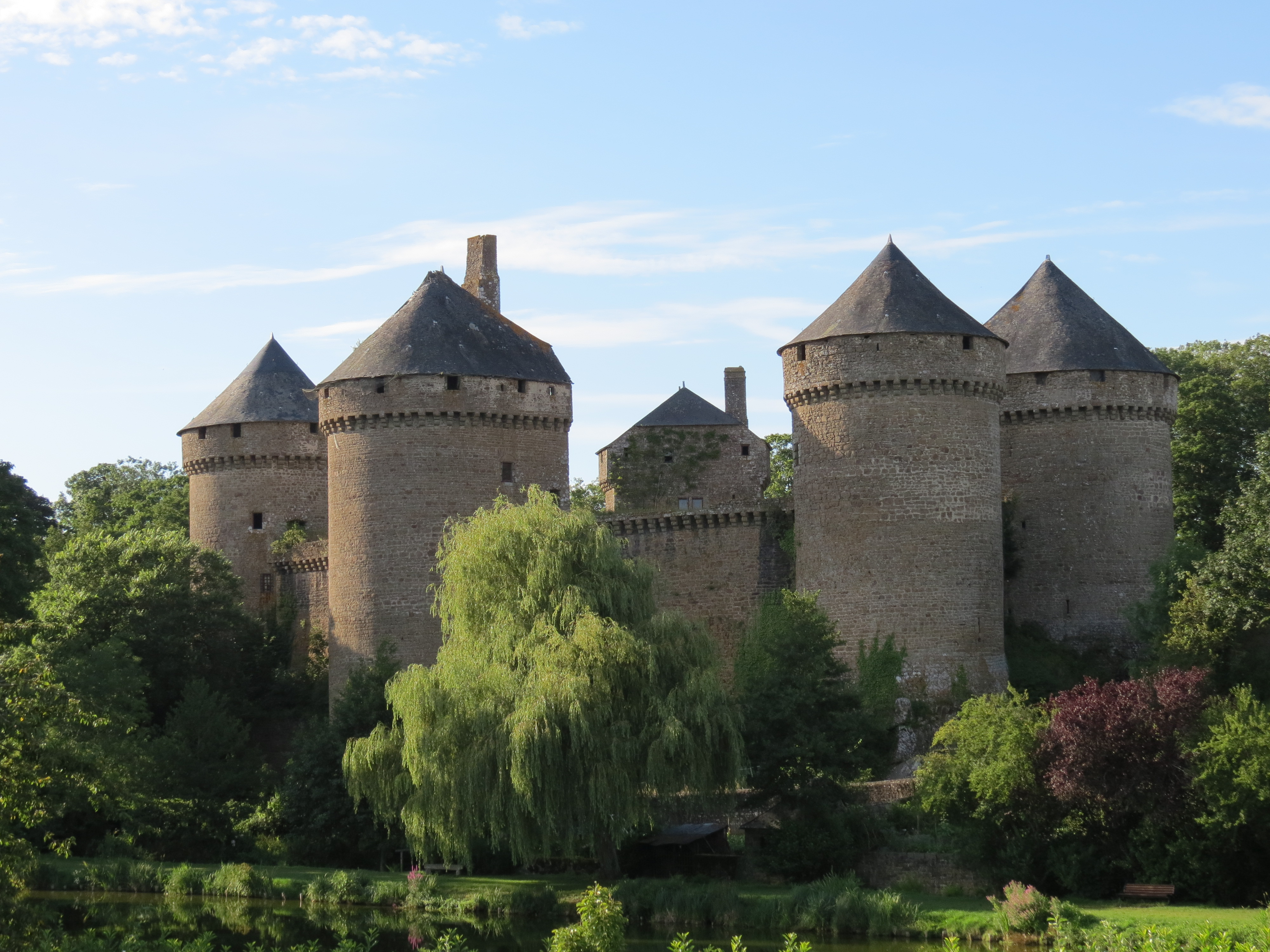
- View from the town

Site information
- Type: Castle
- Open to the public: Yes

Location
- Coordinates: 48.438889°N 0.5°W

Site history
- Built: 1458-1459
- In use: 1459 - end of the 16th century
- Materials: shale, granite.

The Château de Lassay is a 15th-century castle in Lassay-les-Châteaux, in the Mayenne department.

== History ==
The first mention of a castrum in Lassay dates back to the 12th century. Owned by Charles de Vendôme at the beginning of the 15th century, the castle was destroyed by French troops as Charles de Vendôme supported the English during the Hundred Years War.

In 1458, the French king Charles VII allowed the son of Charles de Vendôme, Jean II, to rebuild a castle. The new castle was completed within one year. The barbican was built in 1497–1498.

Since then, the castle has been left mainly intact, with the original 15th-century architecture preserved by the different owners of the castle.

The castle has been listed as a monument historique since 1862. It is open for visitors from April to September.

== Architecture ==
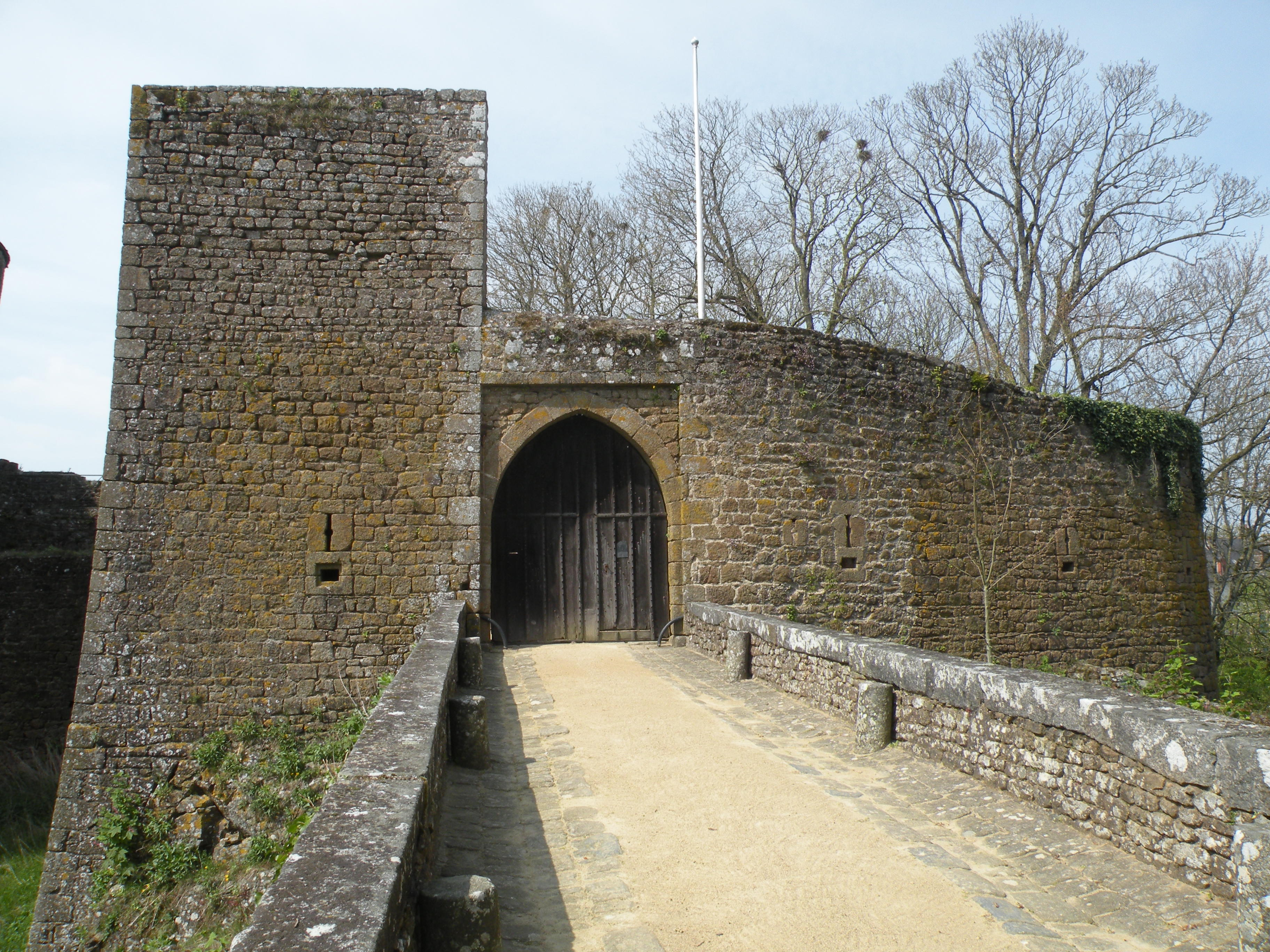
Entrance.

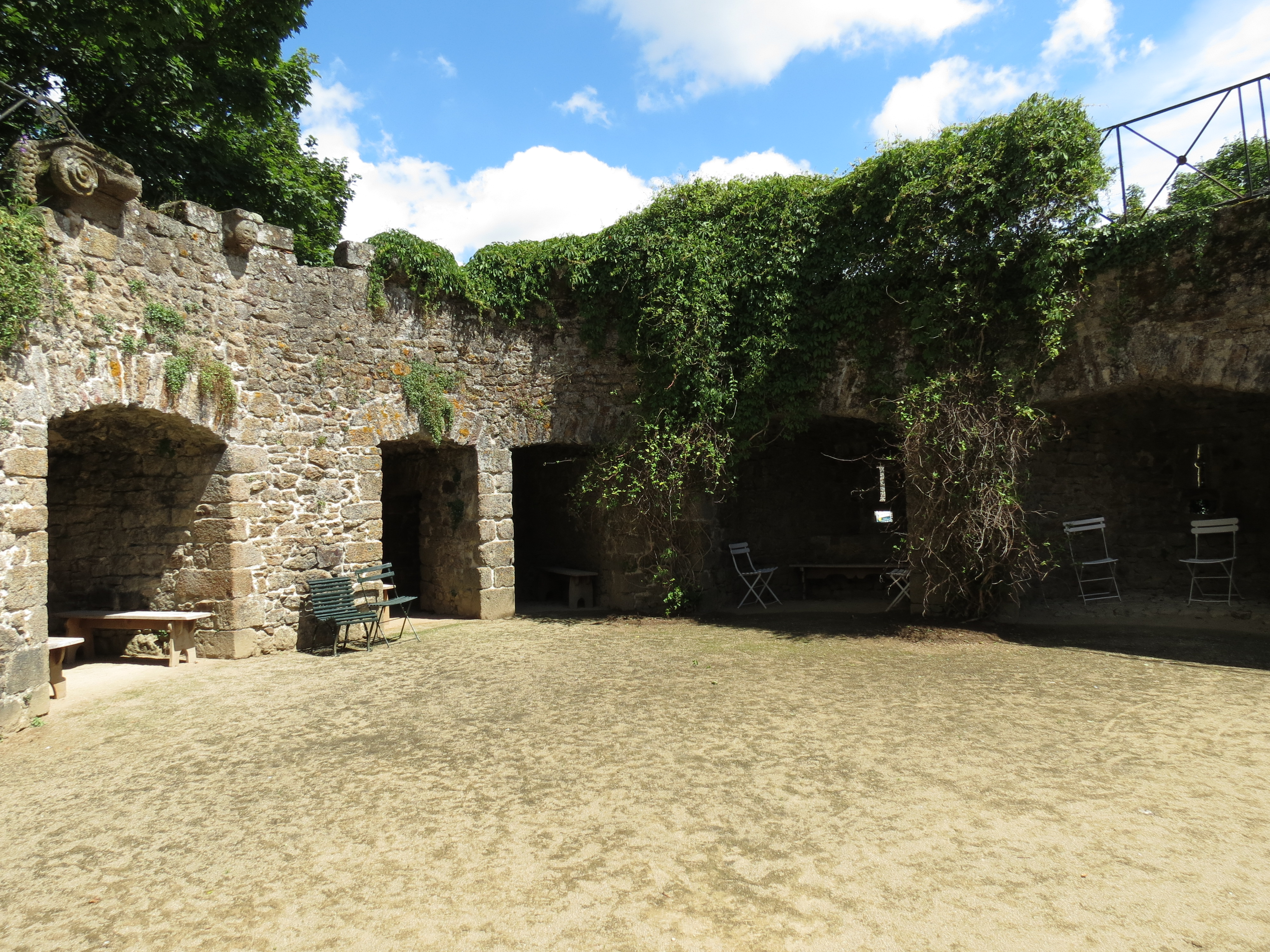
Inside of the barbican.

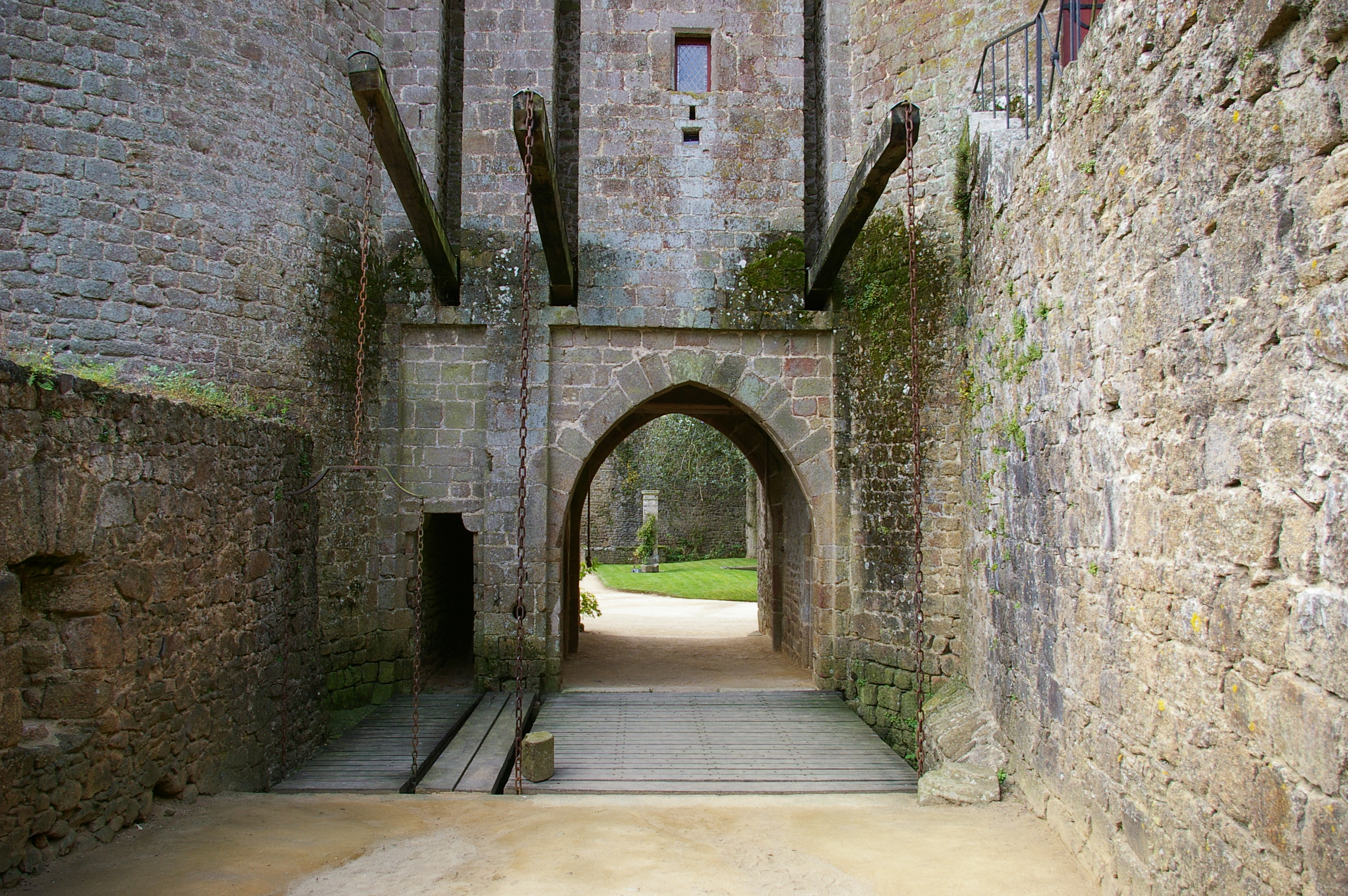
Draw-bridge.

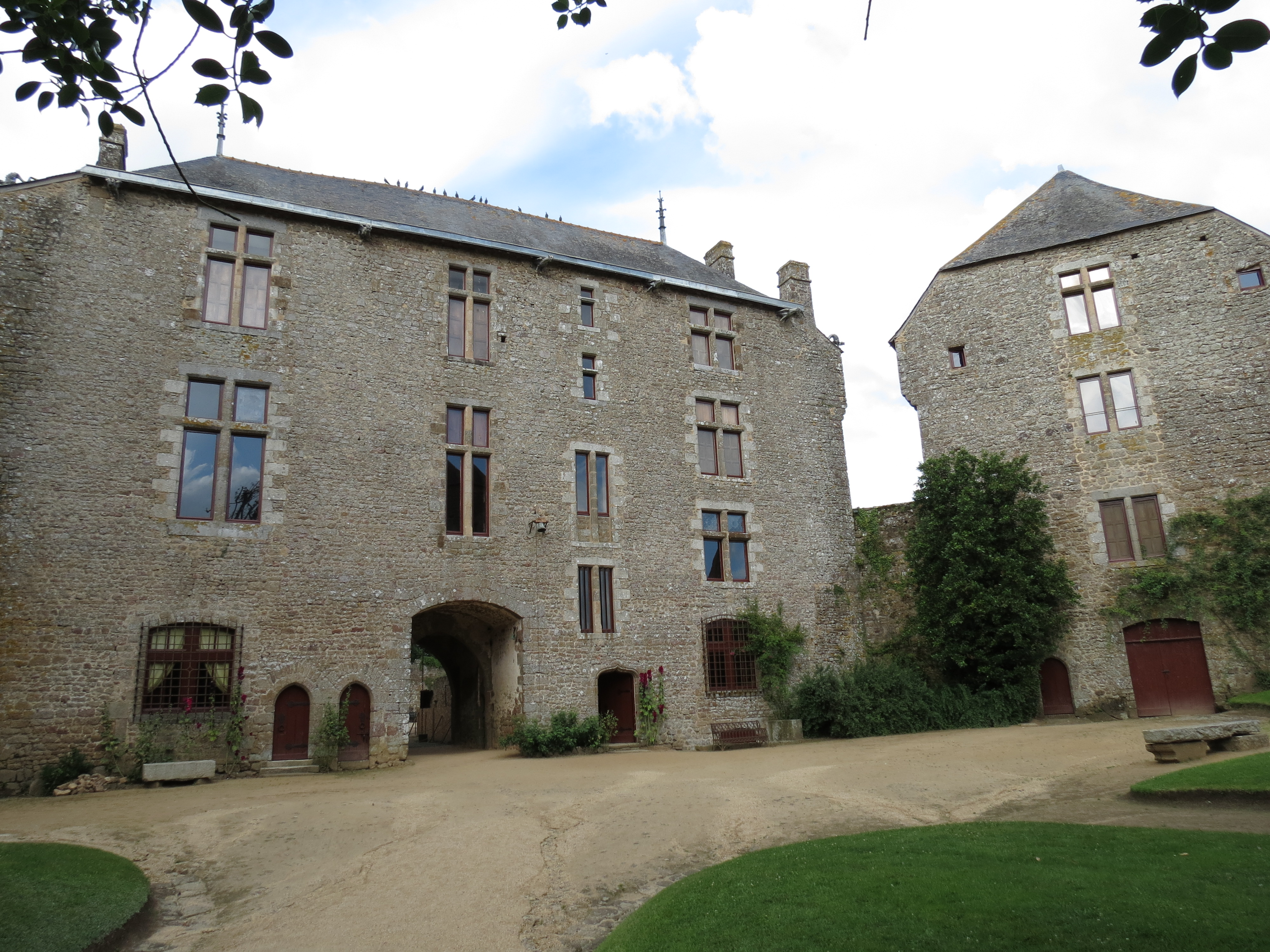
Dwelling and courtyard.

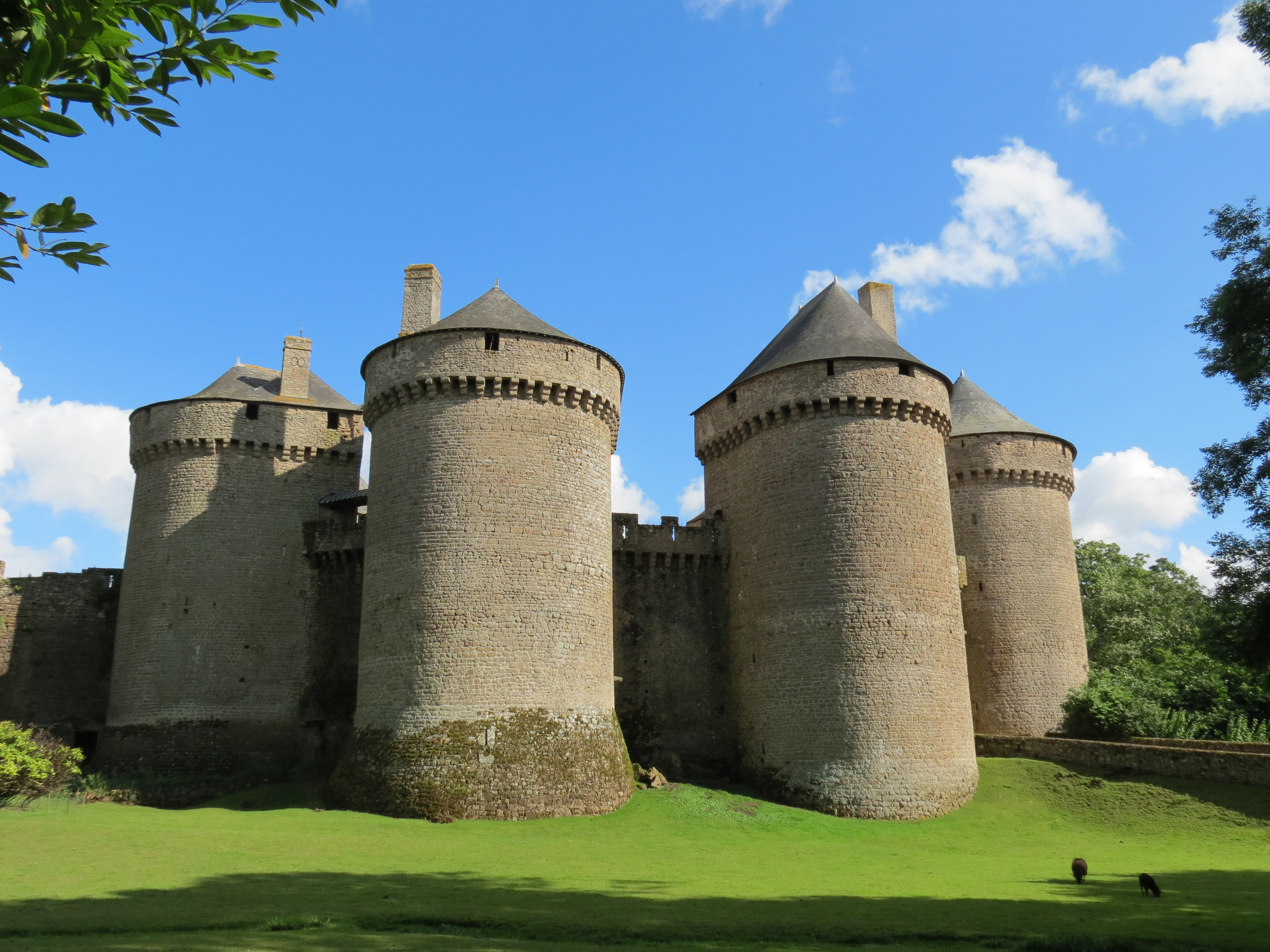
From the park.

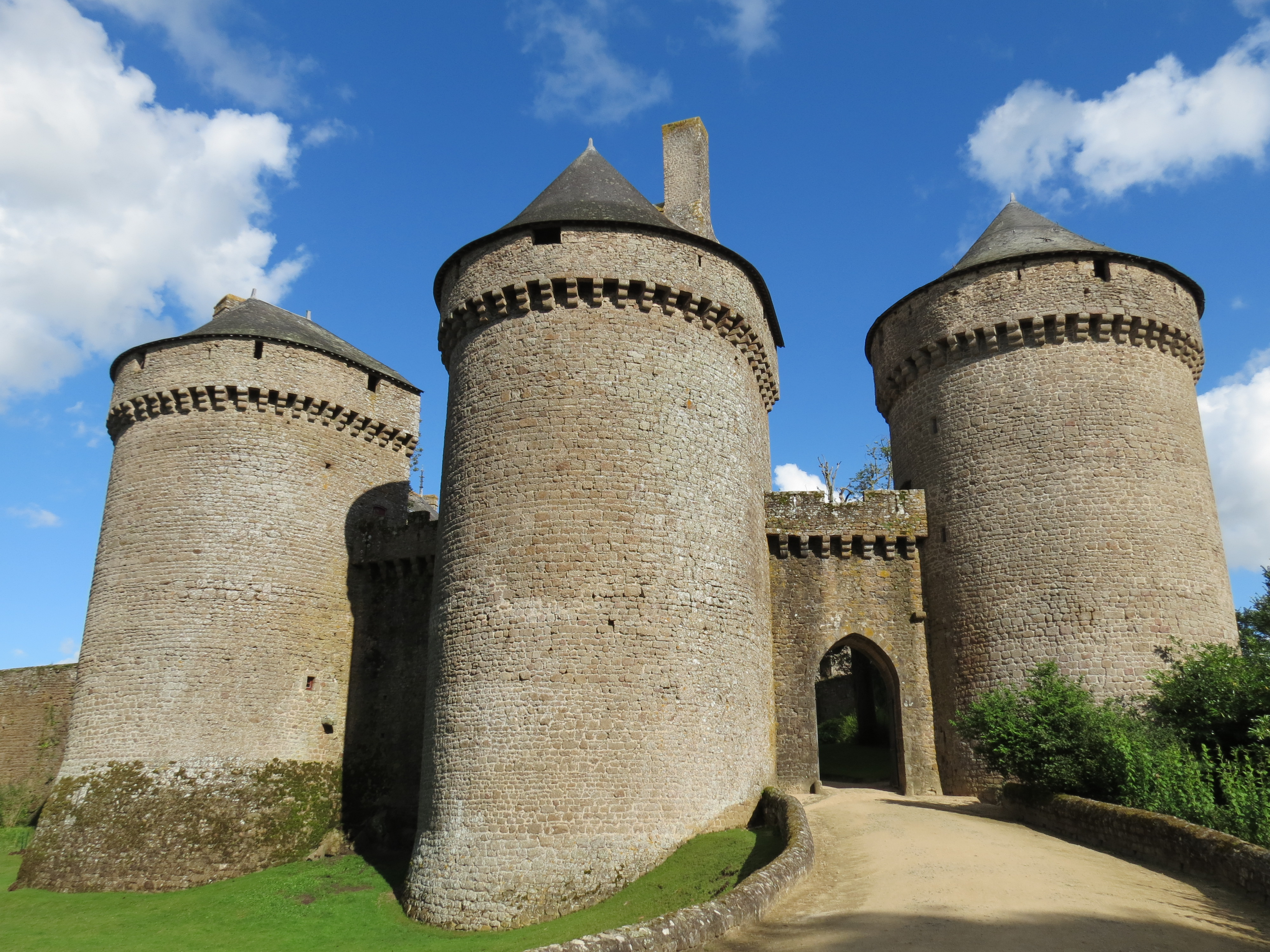
19th century entrance from the park.

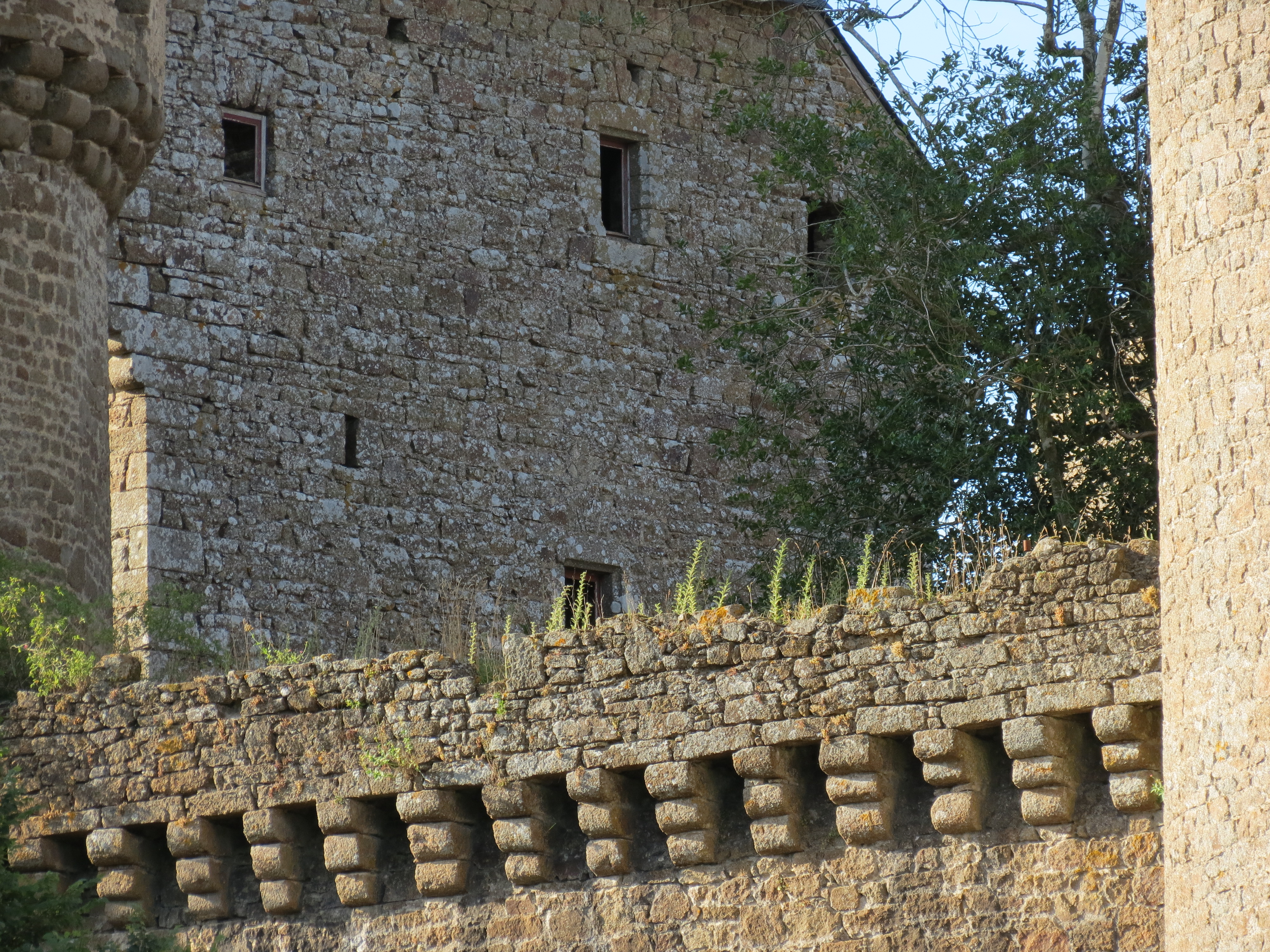
Machicolation.

== See also ==
- List of castles in France

== Bibliography ==
- Eugène Lefèvre-Pontalis, « Le Château de Lassay (Mayenne) », Bulletin monumental, Paris / Caen, A. Picard / H. Delesques, vol. 69, 1904, p. 3-40 Read online.
- Château de Lassay, notice historique, Impr. Europe media publications, 53110 Lassay-les-Châteaux.
