= Château de Tiffauges =

Medieval castle in Pays de la Loire, France

Coordinates: 47°01′00″N 1°06′53″W

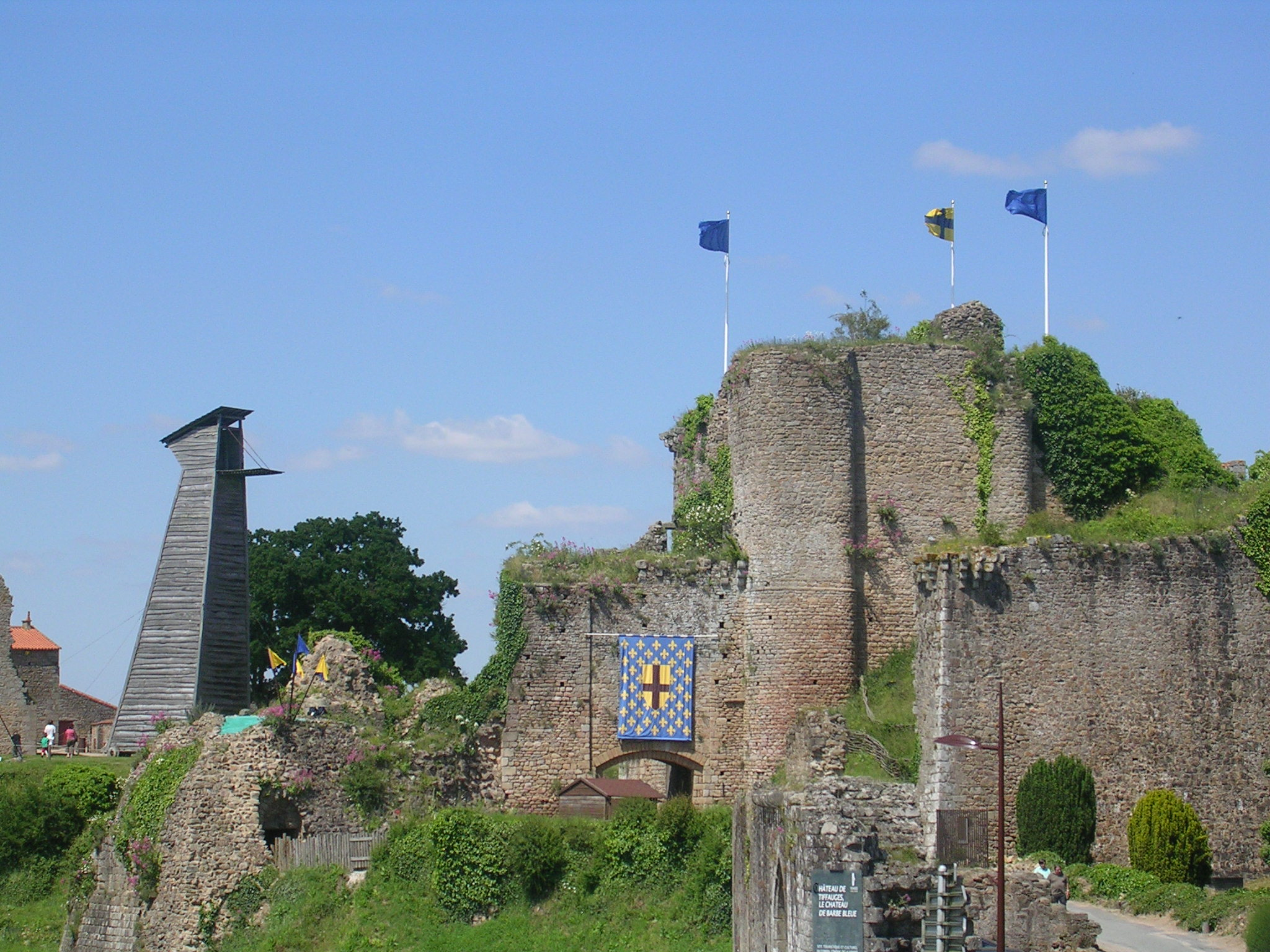
Château de Tiffauges

The Château de Tiffauges is a medieval castle situated in the French commune of Tiffauges in the Vendée département.

The castle is also known as the Château de Barbe-bleu (Bluebeard's castle) after its most famous resident, Gilles de Rais, known as Barbe-bleue. It was here that Bluebeard perpetrated his atrocities.

== Location ==
The castle is in the Marches (border lands) between Brittany, Poitou and Anjou and thus an important strategic point. It is positioned on a hill at the confluence of the Sèvre Nantaise and Crûme rivers, this position providing protection against assailants.

== History ==
The castle was built between the 12th and 16th centuries. The notorious murderer, Gilles de Rais (c. 1405 – 1440) is associated with the castle.

For a long time, the castle was abandoned and lay in ruins, the inner yard even used for a while as a football pitch by the local club, RST Tiffauges. The castle is now owned by the Conseil Général of Vendée. It hosts a series of spectacles and collections, including medieval war machines and an alchemy centre.

The castle has been classified as a monument historique by the French Ministry of Culture since 1957.

== See also ==
- List of castles in France
