= Prée-d'Anjou =

- Commune
- Location of Prée-d'Anjou
- Location within France Location within Pays de la Loire
- Coordinates: 47°50′34″N 0°49′02″W
- Country: France
- Region: Pays de la Loire
- Department: Mayenne
- Arrondissement: Château-Gontier
- Canton: Château-Gontier-sur-Mayenne-2
- Intercommunality: Pays de Château-Gontier

Government
  - Mayor (2020–2026): Serge Guilaume
- Area^{1}: 42.66 km^{2} (16.47 sq mi)
- Population (2023): 1,381
  - Density: 32.37/km^{2} (83.84/sq mi)
- Time zone: UTC+01:00 (CET)
  - Summer (DST): UTC+02:00 (CEST)
- INSEE/Postal code: 53124 /53200
- ^{1} French Land Register data, which excludes lakes, ponds, glaciers > 1 km^{2} (0.386 sq mi or 247 acres) and river estuaries.

Prée-d'Anjou (French pronunciation: [pʁe dɑ̃ʒu]) is a commune in the department of Mayenne, western France. The municipality was established on 1 January 2018 by merger of the former communes of Laigné (the seat) and Ampoigné.

== Buildings ==
- Église Saint-Jean-Baptiste d'Ampoigné
- Église Saint-Martin-de-Vertou

== See also ==
- Communes of the Mayenne department
