= Église Saint-Jean-Baptiste d'Ampoigné =

Church in Ampoigné, France

Coordinates: 47°48′41″N 0°49′30″W

Saint-Jean-Baptiste Église Saint-Jean-Baptiste d'Ampoigné
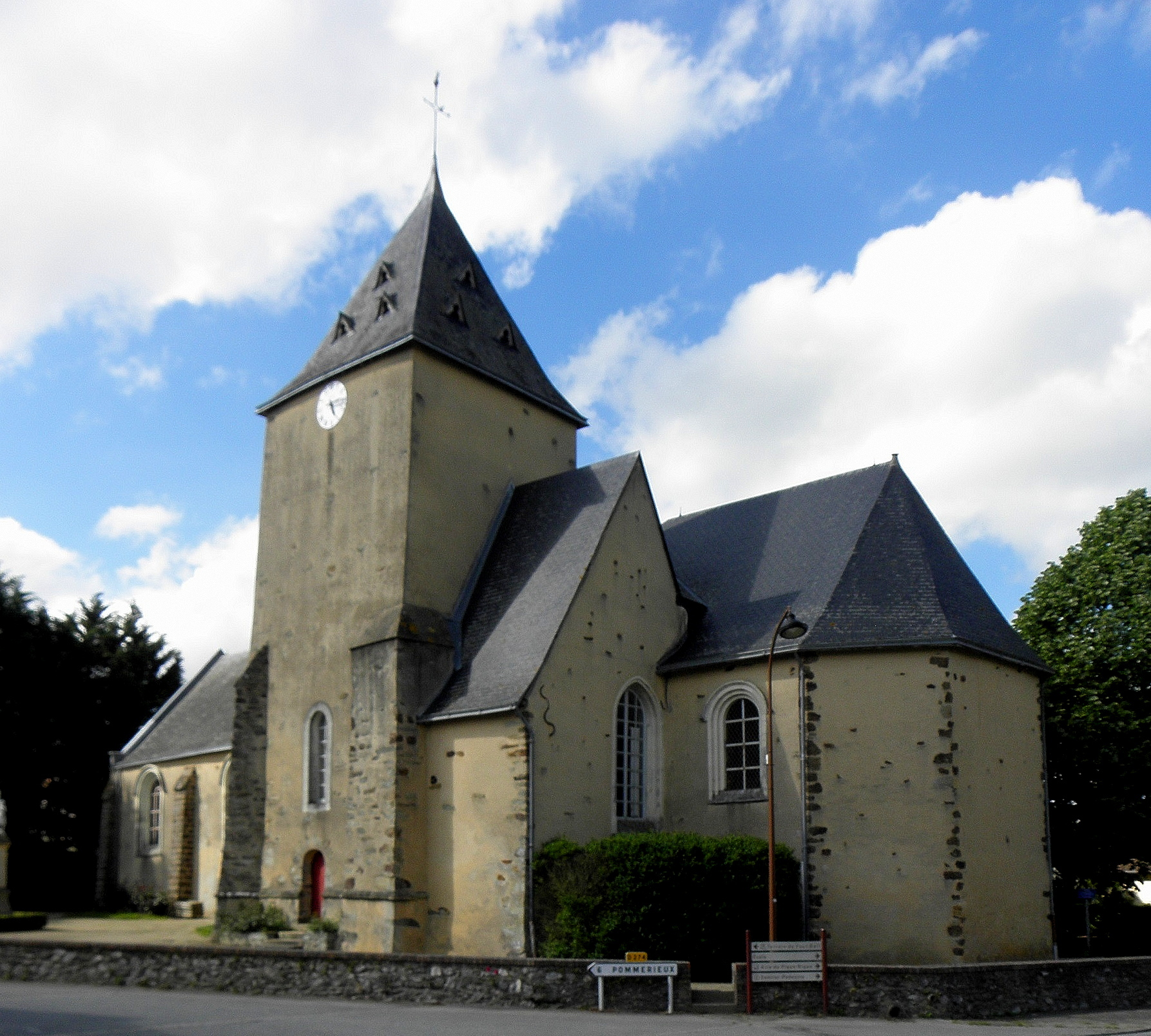
- Façade of the church

Religion
- Affiliation: Roman Catholic
- Status: Active

Location
- Location: Antoine de La Garanderie Square, Ampoigné, France
- Interactive map of Saint-Jean-Baptiste; Église Saint-Jean-Baptiste d'Ampoigné

Architecture
- Type: Church

The Saint-Jean-Baptiste Church (French: Église Saint-Jean-Baptiste d'Ampoigné) is a church in Ampoigné, Mayenne, France. It was built in the 12th century by the abbey of Saint-Florent de Saumur. It is a Romanesque style building remodeled several times retaining the aesthetics from the 12th and 15th centuries.

== Structure ==
It has buttresses in red sandstone.
