= Laigné =

- Part of Prée-d'Anjou
- Location of Laigné
- Location within France Location within Pays de la Loire
- Coordinates: 47°50′34″N 0°49′02″W
- Country: France
- Region: Pays de la Loire
- Department: Mayenne
- Arrondissement: Château-Gontier
- Canton: Château-Gontier
- Commune: Prée-d'Anjou
- Area^{1}: 21.54 km^{2} (8.32 sq mi)
- Elevation: 68 m (223 ft)
- Highest elevation: 94 m (308 ft)
- Lowest elevation: 45 m (148 ft)
- Population (2022): 835
  - Density: 38.8/km^{2} (100/sq mi)
- Time zone: UTC+01:00 (CET)
  - Summer (DST): UTC+02:00 (CEST)
- Postal code: 53200
- ^{1} French Land Register data, which excludes lakes, ponds, glaciers > 1 km^{2} (0.386 sq mi or 247 acres) and river estuaries.

Laigné (French pronunciation: [lɛɲe]) is a former commune in the Mayenne department in north-western France. On 1 January 2018, it was merged into the new commune of Prée-d'Anjou.

== See also ==
- Communes of the Mayenne department
