= Ampoigné =

- Part of Prée-d'Anjou
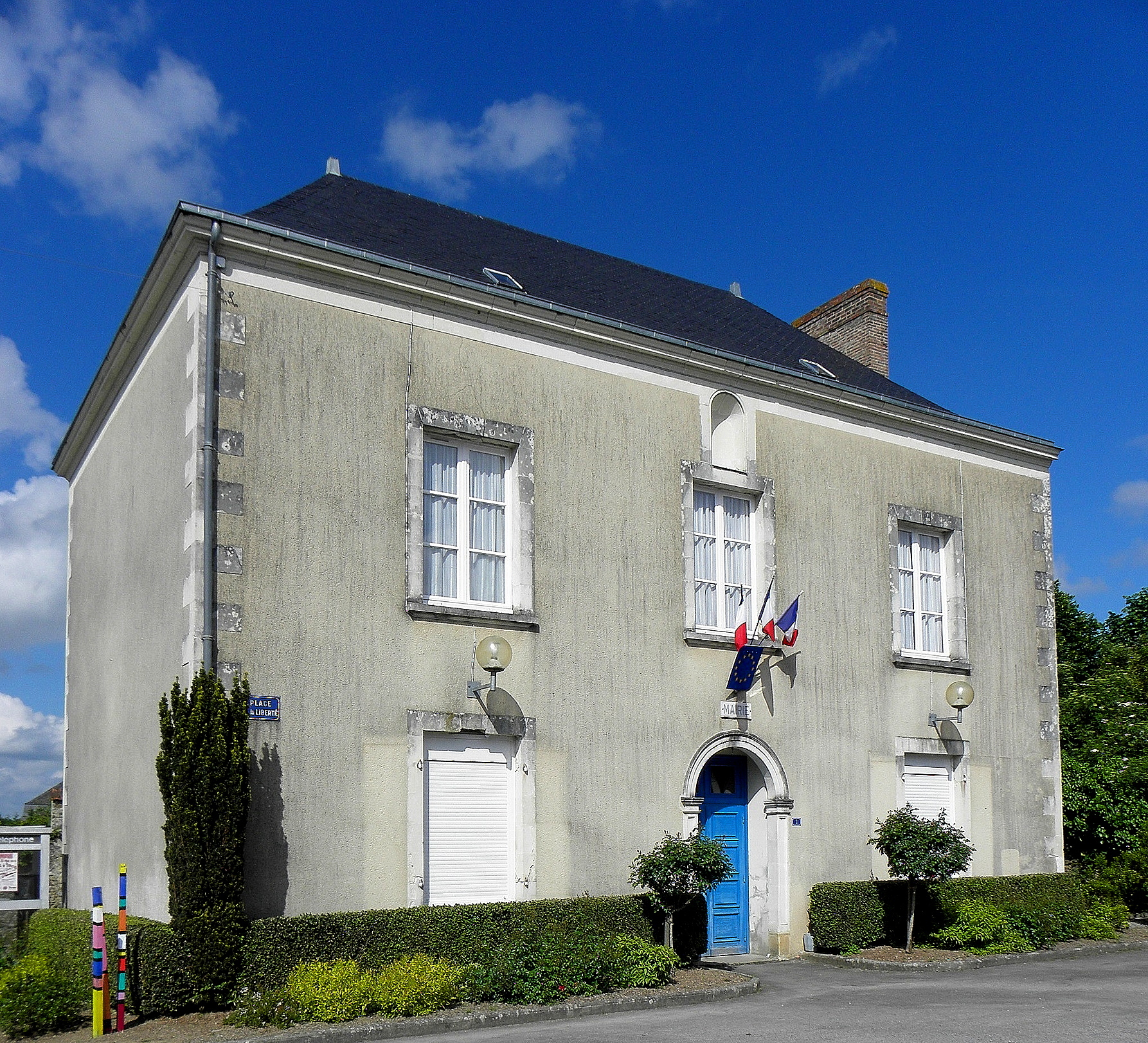
- Ampoigné Town hall
- Location of Ampoigné
- Location within France Location within Pays de la Loire
- Coordinates: 47°48′41″N 0°49′28″W
- Country: France
- Region: Pays de la Loire
- Department: Mayenne
- Arrondissement: Château-Gontier
- Canton: Château-Gontier
- Commune: Prée-d'Anjou
- Area^{1}: 21.12 km^{2} (8.15 sq mi)
- Elevation: 80 m (260 ft)
- Highest elevation: 92 m (302 ft)
- Lowest elevation: 47 m (154 ft)
- Population (2023): 544
  - Density: 25.8/km^{2} (66.7/sq mi)
- Time zone: UTC+01:00 (CET)
  - Summer (DST): UTC+02:00 (CEST)
- Postal code: 53200
- ^{1} French Land Register data, which excludes lakes, ponds, glaciers > 1 km^{2} (0.386 sq mi or 247 acres) and river estuaries.

Ampoigné (French pronunciation: [ɑ̃pwaɲe]) is a former commune in the Mayenne department in northwestern France. On 1 January 2018, it was merged into the new commune of Prée-d'Anjou.

== Personalities linked to the commune ==
- Antoine de la Garanderie (born and buried in Ampoigné), educator and philosopher.

== See also ==
- Communes of Mayenne
