= Antoine de La Garanderie =

French educator and philosopher

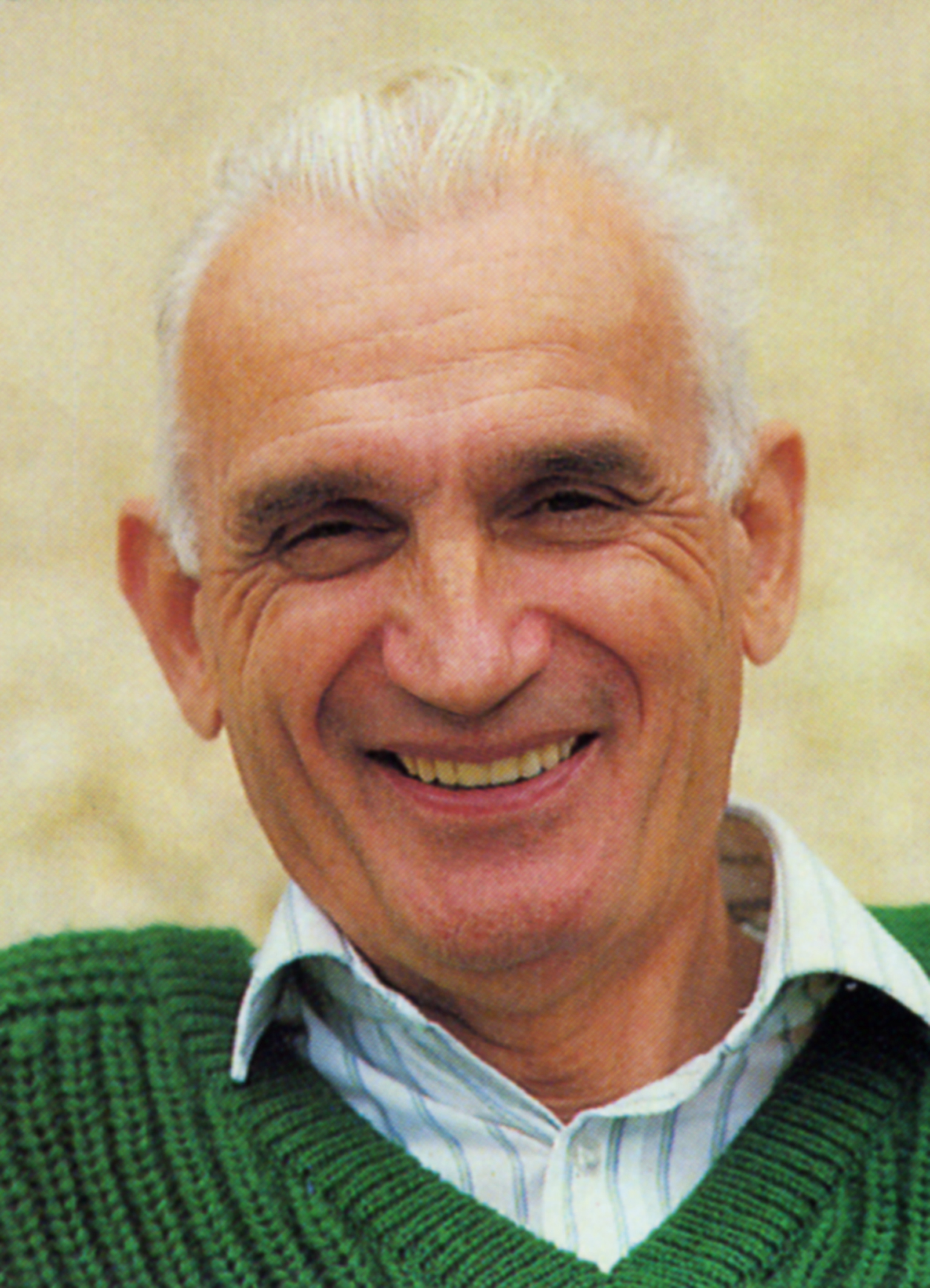
- Antoine de La Garanderie in 1988
- Born: 22 March 1920; Ampoigné, Mayenne, France
- Died: 27 June 2010 (aged 90); Paris, France
- Occupation(s): Educator, philosopher
- Known for: La Valeur de l'ennui Critique de la raison pédagogique

Antoine de La Garanderie (22 March 1920 – 27 June 2010) was a French educator and philosopher.

== Honours ==
- 1970, Montyon Prize: La Valeur de l'ennui

== Bibliography ==
- Charles Gardou (dir.), La gestion mentale en questions. À propos des travaux d'Antoine de La Garanderie. Ramonville Saint-Agne, Éditions Érès, 1995.
- Jean-Pierre Gaté
  - Éduquer au sens de l'écrit. Paris, Éditions Nathan, 1998.
  - T. Payen de la Garanderie (collaboration), Introduction à Antoine de La Garanderie. Naissance d'un pédagogue. Lyon, Chroniques sociales, 2007.
  - A. Géninet, M. Giroul, T. Payen de La Garanderie (collaboration), Vocabulaire de la gestion mentale. Lyon, Chroniques sociales, 2009.
  - La pensée d'Antoine de La Garanderie (dir.) : Lecture plurielle Postface de Renaud Hétier, Lyon, Chronique sociale, 2013
