= List of new French communes created in 2022 =

This article contains a list of new French communes created in 2022 (French: communes nouvelles), this is to say a list of new French communes for which prefectural decrees pronouncing their creation defined a date of creation between 1 January 2022 and 31 December 2022.

This list contains 9 new communes regrouping 19 previous communes.

== Legislative history ==
The law n^{o} 2010-1563 of 16 December 2010 to reform local authorities replaced the previous regime of merging communes defined in the "Marcellin" law of 16 July 1971 with a renewed consolidation procedure, resulting in the creation of a "new commune". It was supplemented in 2015 by a new law n^{o} 2015-292 of 16 March 2015 relating to the improvement of the regime of the new commune, for strong and lively communes, setting up temporary financial incentives in order to promote the creation of new municipalities before 1 January 2019.

== Enumeration ==
=== Number of new communes created in 2022 ===
9 new communes were created on 1 January 2022. They regrouped 19 former communes.

=== Total number of communes in France ===
On 1 January 2022, the French Republic counted 34,955 communes, of which 34,826 are located in metropolitan France and 129 in overseas departments and regions.

Year	Date	Metropolitan France			Overseas departments and regions	Total
Year	Date	New communes	Regrouped communes	Total # of communes	Overseas departments and regions	Total
2021	31 December 2021			34,836	129	34,965
2022	1 January 2022	9	19	34,826	129	34,955
2022	Total	9	19	34,826	129	34,955

== Detailed list ==
Article L. 2113-6 of the general code of local and regional authorities (CGCT) specifies that "the decree of the representative of the State in the department pronouncing the creation of the new municipality determines the name of the new municipality, if necessary in view of the opinions issued by the municipal councils, fixes the date of creation and in full, in as needed, the terms". The following table presents these indicators for each of the new communes created in 2021: name, date of the prefectural decree announcing its creation, date of creation and multiple modalities (existence of delegated communities, seat of the commune), or complementary information (population).

Department	#	New communes				Former Communes			Date of prefectural decree	Date of creation	Ref.
Department	#	Name	Code INSEE	Seat	Population (2018)	#	Names	Delegated commune	Date of prefectural decree	Date of creation	Ref.
Aisne	1	Bazoches-et-Saint-Thibaut	02054	Bazoches-sur-Vesles	542	2	Bazoches-sur-Vesles and Saint-Thibaut	Yes	30 September 2021	1 January 2022	
Charente	1	Lignières-Ambleville	16186	Lignières-Sonneville	741	2	Lignières-Sonneville and Ambleville	Yes	23 September 2021	1 January 2022	
Corrèze	1	Montaignac-sur-Doustre	19143	Montaignac-Saint-Hippolyte	668	2	Le Jardin and Montaignac-Saint-Hippolyte	non	30 September 2021	1 January 2022	
Dordogne	1	Pechs-de-l'Espérance	24325	Peyrillac-et-Millac	773	3	Cazoulès, Orliaguet and Peyrillac-et-Millac	Yes	27 September 2021	1 January 2022	
Doubs	2	Cussey-sur-Lison	25185	Cussey-sur-Lison	72	2	Châtillon-sur-Lison and Cussey-sur-Lison	No	14 December 2021	1 January 2022	
Doubs	2	Les Monts-Ronds	25375	Mérey-sous-Montrond	646	2	Mérey-sous-Montrond and Villers-sous-Montrond	No	22 December 2021	1 January 2022	
Drôme	1	Saint-Jean-de-Galaure	26216	La Motte-de-Galaure	1263	2	La Motte-de-Galaure and Mureils	Yes	19 October 2021	1 January 2022	
Morbihan	1	Saint-Gérand-Croixanvec	56213	Saint-Gérand	1294	2	Saint-Gérand and Croixanvec	Yes	30 September 2021	1 January 2022	
Vendée	1	L'Aiguillon-la-Presqu'île	85001	L'Aiguillon-sur-Mer	2726	2	L'Aiguillon-sur-Mer and La Faute-sur-Mer	Yes	7 December 2021	1 January 2022	

== See also ==
- List of new French commune projects
- List of new French communes created in 2015
- List of new French communes created in 2016
- List of new French communes created in 2017
- List of new French communes created in 2018
- List of new French communes created in 2019
- List of new French communes created in 2021
- List of new French communes created in 2023
- List of new French communes created in 2024
- List of new French communes created in 2025
