= Souillac, Lot =

Souillac
- Commune
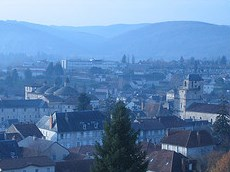
- A general view of Souillac

- Coat of arms
- Location of Souillac
- Location within France Location within Occitanie
- Coordinates: 44°54′02″N 1°28′44″E
- Country: France
- Region: Occitania
- Department: Lot
- Arrondissement: Gourdon
- Canton: Souillac
- Intercommunality: Causses et Vallée de la Dordogne

Government
  - Mayor (2020–2026): Gilles Liébus
- Area^{1}: 25.92 km^{2} (10.01 sq mi)
- Elevation: 221 m (725 ft)
- Highest elevation: 314 m (1,030 ft)
- Lowest elevation: 80 m (260 ft)
- Population (2023): 3,192
  - Density: 123.1/km^{2} (319.0/sq mi)
- Time zone: UTC+01:00 (CET)
  - Summer (DST): UTC+02:00 (CEST)
- INSEE/Postal code: 46309 /46200
- ^{1} French Land Register data, which excludes lakes, ponds, glaciers > 1 km^{2} (0.386 sq mi or 247 acres) and river estuaries.

Souillac (French pronunciation: [sujak]; Languedocien: Solhac) is a commune in the Lot department in south-western France, on the river Dordogne. It is the site of the Brive–Souillac Airport, which opened in 2010. The town hosts an annual jazz festival in July. The abbey church has famous Romanesque carvings.

== History ==
Souillac grew up around an abbey dependent on the Benedictine monastery of Aurillac (Cantal). Two donors helped start the community, Count Geraud, Abbot of Aurillac and Viscount Frotard in 909. When the Benedictines settled in the plain of Souillès, so named from a local word "souilh" meaning muddy and marshy place where wild boars wallowed, they replaced a community supposedly founded there by Saint Eloi. The monks drained and transformed the swamp into a rich estate. The stone abbey church Abbatiale Sainte Marie was built in the 1100s and was completed in 1145.

During the Hundred Years' War, the English troops besieged and occupied the town twice, once in 1351 and again in 1356. The abbey was granted its independence in 1473.

On 3 December 1508, as a result of a papal bull, the monastery was officially designated as an abbey. The French Wars of Religion brought further trouble to the town and abbey, both ransacked by Protestant forces between 1562 and 1573 and the parish church Saint-Martin was destroyed. The monastery buildings were burnt, the church ransacked and an attempt made to blow up its walls.

Restoration of the Abbey church and the monastery buildings began in 1632 by the lord-abbot Henry de la Mothe Houdancourt and was completed by 1712. By 1658, the abbey was now under the control of the Congregation of Saint Maur. The French Revolution brought the end to the abbey. The Constituent Assembly announced the confiscation of all church assets by the state on 2 November 1789. With a decree on 14 April 1790, it returned the Abbey to the civil authority to sell its assets with just the Eglise Sainte-Marie now remaining. The monks were expelled on 25 November 1790 and the assets sold the same day for 11,000 livres.

The abbey church was turned into a Temple of Reason in March 1794. It reopened as a church in 1801 and received its first priest in 1803 as a parish church. Repairs on the church continued until 1838 and it was proclaimed a national monument in 1841. The state took over the repairs of the exterior between 1842 and 1848 including two aspses.

== Geography ==
Souillac is in the upper Dordogne Valley where the river cuts through the limestone plateau of Haut-Quercy, a historic name for the northern part of the Department of Lot. This is part of the Massif Central, an elevated region in south central France. To the north of Souillac lies the commune of Lachapelle-Auzac, to the east Mayrac and Pinsac, to the south Lanzac, to the south west Peyrillac-et-Millac and Cazoulès, to the west Orliaguet and to the northwest Salignac-Eyvigues, Borrèze and Gignac. Souillac station has rail connections to Brive-la-Gaillarde, Cahors and Toulouse.

=== Town ===
Souillac is a small market town and is the hub for the area. This is an agricultural region which is known for its walnuts, strawberries and quiet, rural way of life.

== Demographics ==
Historical population
Year	Pop.	±% p.a.
1968	3,630	—
1975	3,845	+0.83%
1982	3,570	−1.05%
1990	3,459	−0.39%
1999	3,671	+0.66%
2007	3,911	+0.79%
2012	3,615	−1.56%
2017	3,284	−1.90%
2023	3,192	−0.47%
Source: INSEE

== Culture and contemporary life ==
=== Places and monuments ===
- The abbey buildings of the l'Abbaye Sainte-Marie, rebuilt in the seventeenth and eighteenth centuries, listed on 11 January 1991 as historical monuments;
- The 12th century L'église abbatiale Sainte-Marie de Souillac, classified in 1840 as a historical monument. Several objects are referenced in the Palissy database. It has a Stoltz gallery organ, the instrumental part of which dates from 1850 was classified on 12 May 1978 as a historical monument. It was restored in 1988, and again in 2017, by the organ builder Daniel Birouste. Its titular organist has been Christophe Loiseleur Des Longchamps since 1991;
- the old church of Saint-Martin and its belfry, classified in 1925 as a historical monument;
- Dolmen Laval, also called Tumulus Laval;
- The Pont Louis-Vicat, the first bridge in the world to use an artificial cement invented by Louis Vicat;
- The banks of the Dordogne river;
- The Viaduc de la Borrèze, also known as the Aubugues viaduct, from the name of the district it overlooks, built from 1881 to 1885 above the Borrèze river, listed on 28 December 1984 as a historical monument. It is the longest of the seven railway structures (along with the Sorbier viaduct, the Boulet viaduct, the Marjaudes viaduct, the Présignac viaduct, the Lamothe viaduct and the Bramefond viaduct) which have earned Souillac its nickname of the City of Seven Viaducts;
- The Musée de l'Automate. It houses a collection of more than 300 mechanical toys from the nineteenth and twentieth centuries from one of the most important houses in the field: the Maison Roullet-Decamps;
- Around this museum was a trail of animated signs in the streets of the city, most of them made by a local ironworker;
- The market hall built from 1832 to 1836, listed in 2004 as a historical monument;
- Artists' studios;
- The Ancienne chapelle Notre-Dame du Port, destroyed for the construction of the Louis-Vicat bridge;
- Chapelle Saint-Étienne Lacombe de Custals;
- Église de Bourzolles. While it was supposed to be razed, the church was sold by the city of Souillac to Étienne Cluzel, a lover of old stones, who restored it, in the company of relatives.

=== Tourism ===
The town is on the main railway line from Paris to Toulouse and is about 15 km (9 mi) south of the Brive–Souillac Airport which has international flights. The most notable building in the town is the abbey church of Sainte-Marie. The domed roofs are similar to but rather smaller than those of Périgueux Cathedral. Fragments of the original Romanesque sculptures are grouped just inside the west door. Behind the abbey church is the Musée de l'Automate which has a large collection of mechanical figures and dolls.

An international jazz festival is held annually in the town in July. The festival was started in 1976 by a group of volunteers enthused by Sim Copans, a United States Army non-combatant in World War I who came to live in nearby Lanzac. The festival features live concerts and other jazz-related activities.

== Gallery ==
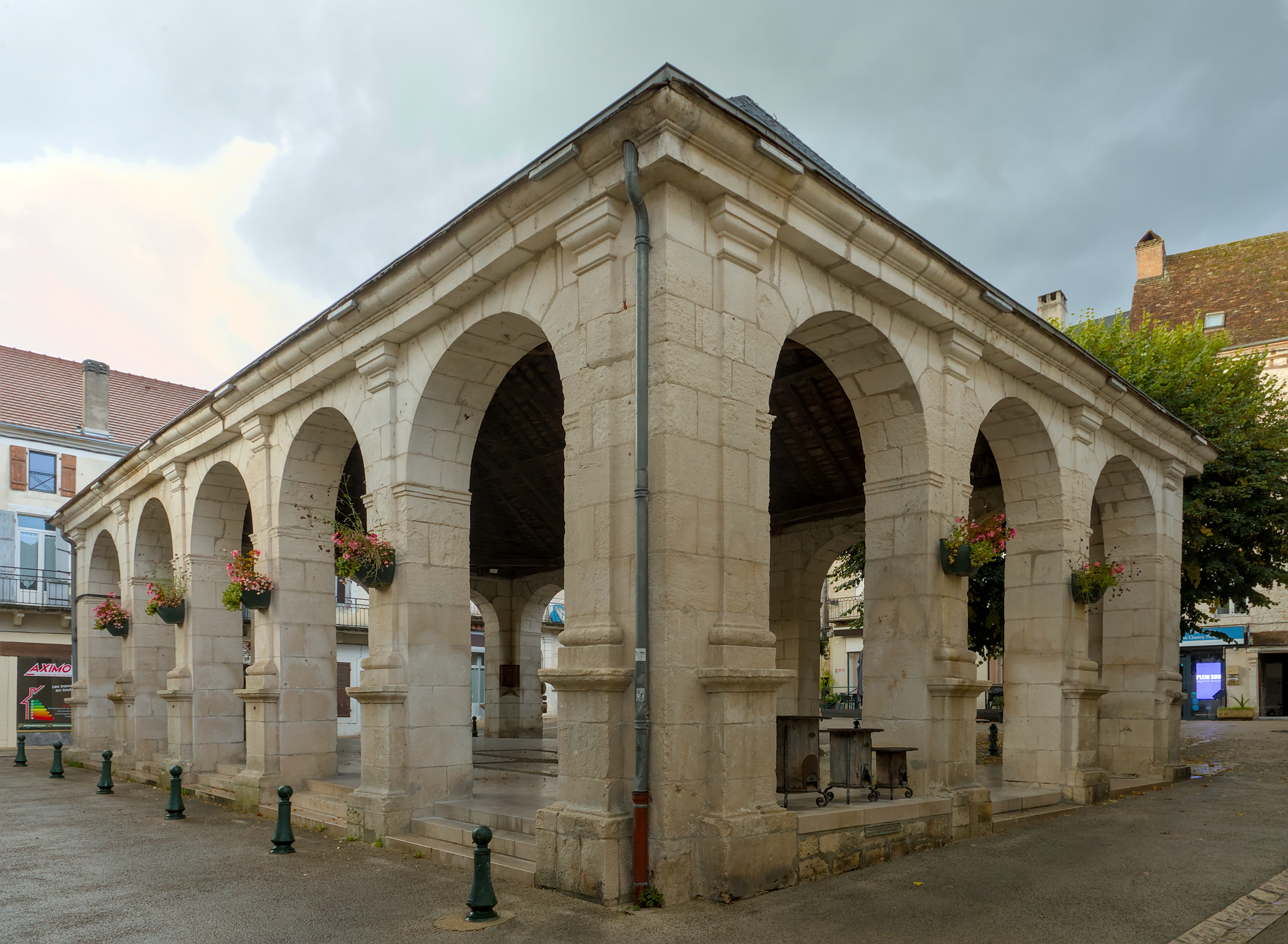
Market hall

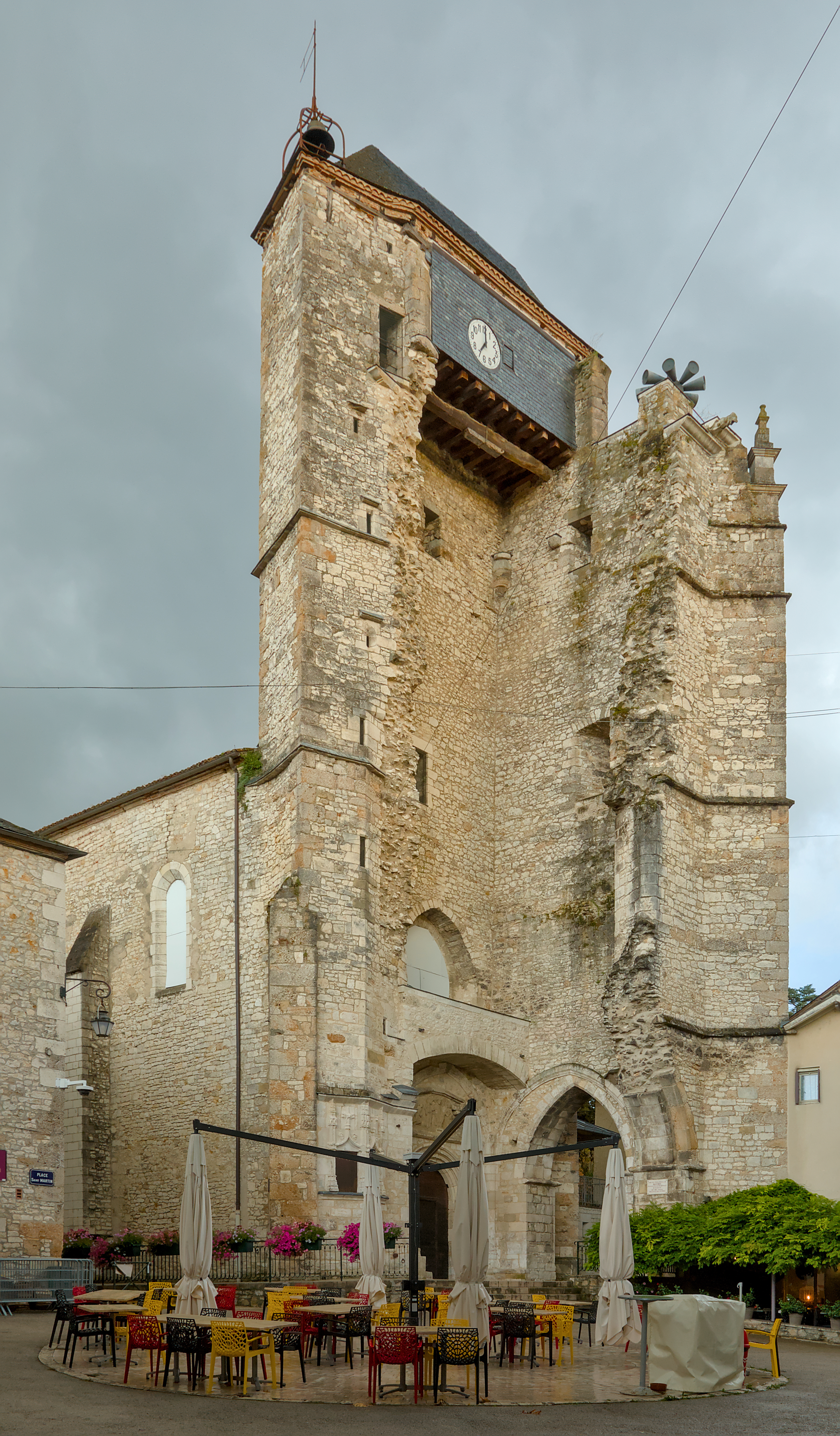
Old Church of Saint-Martin

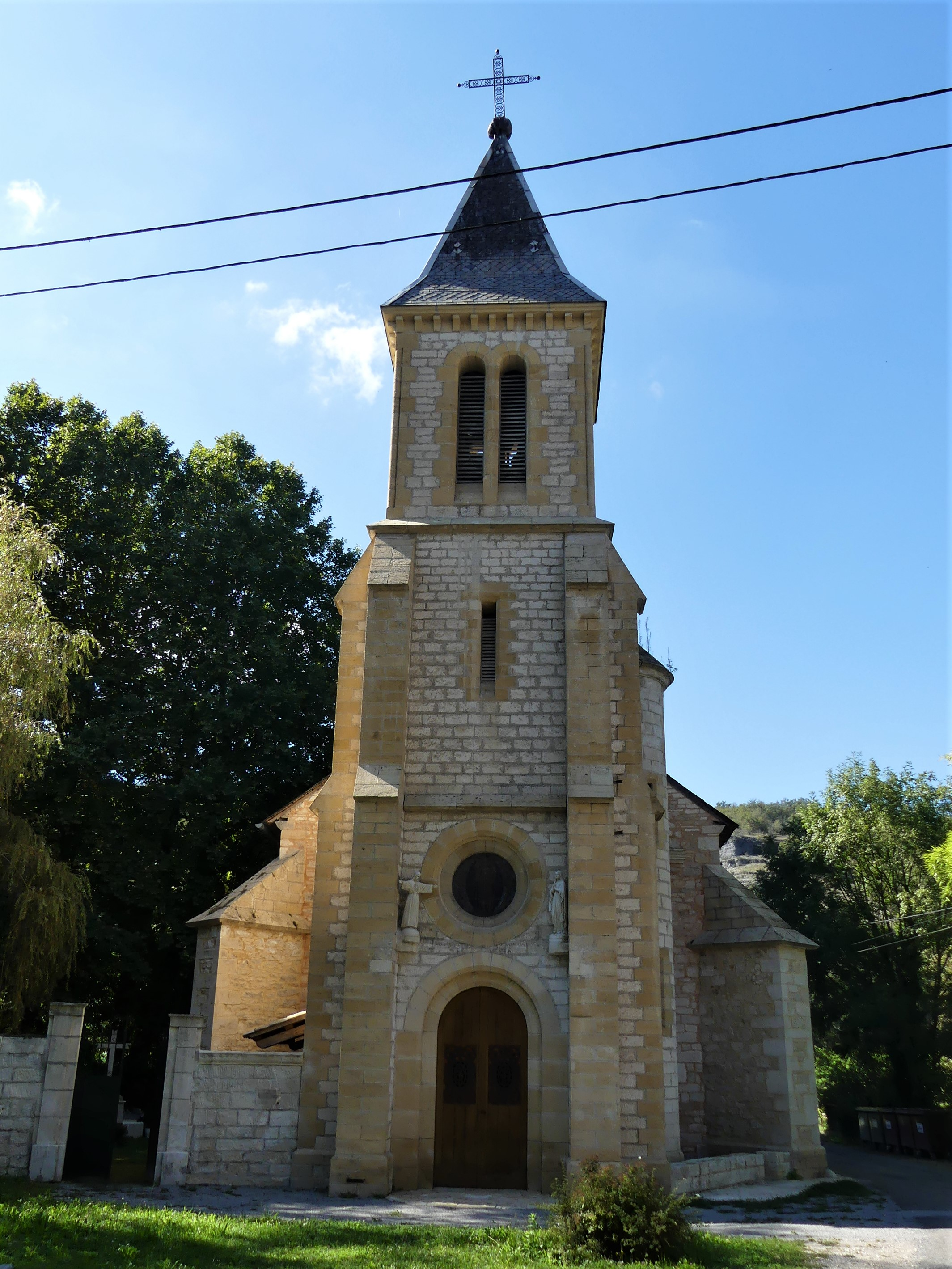
Bourzolles church

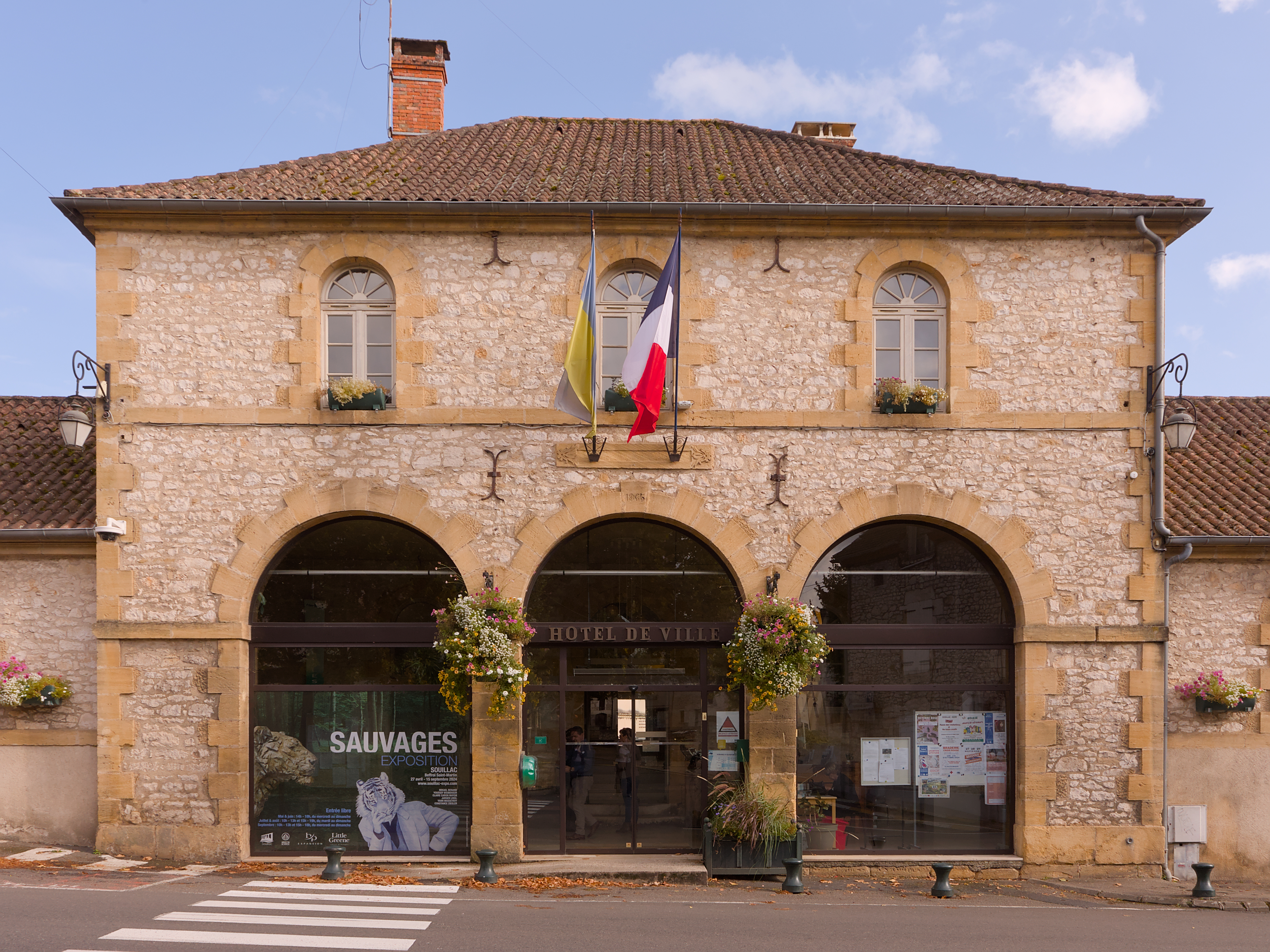
Town hall

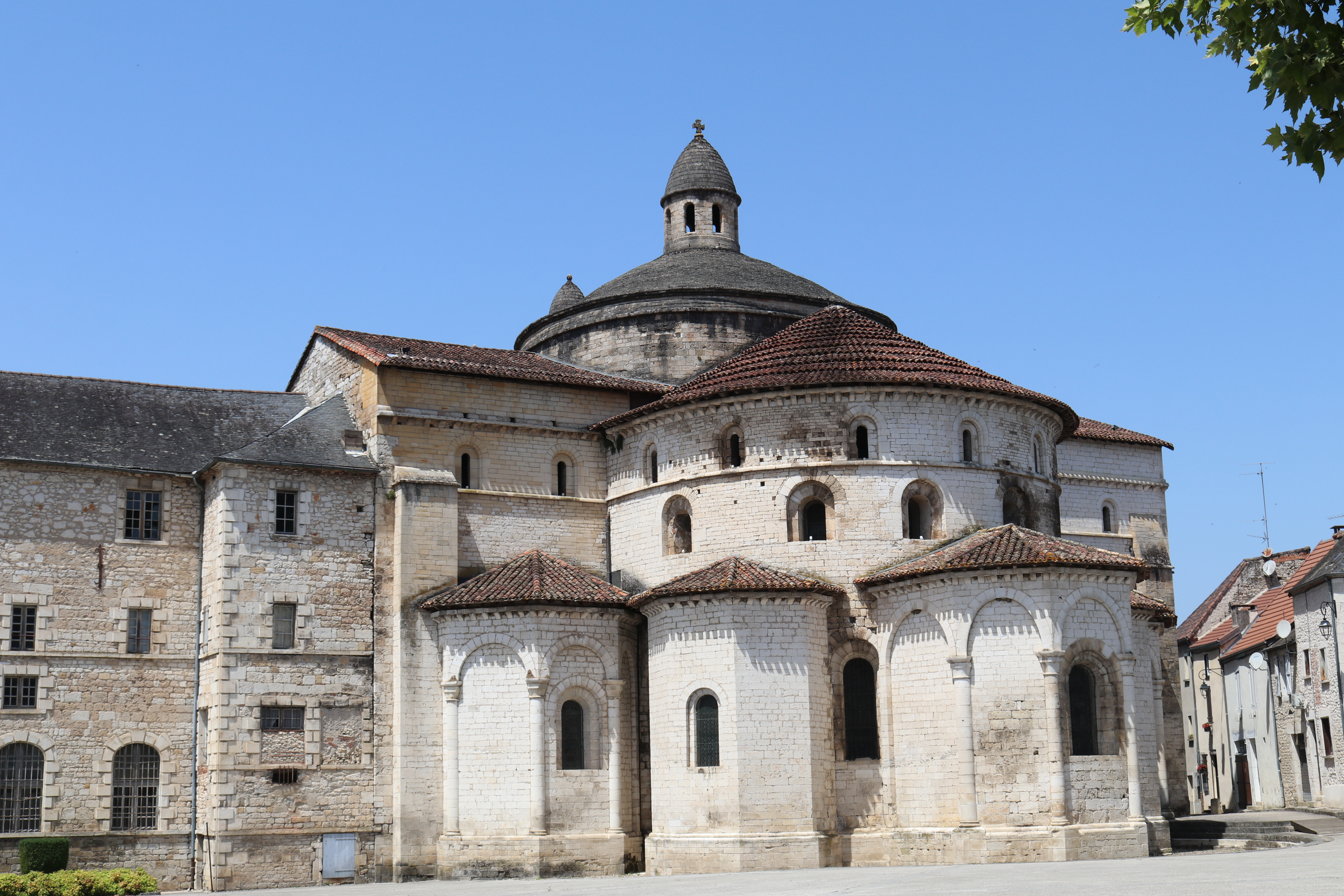
St Mary's abbey church

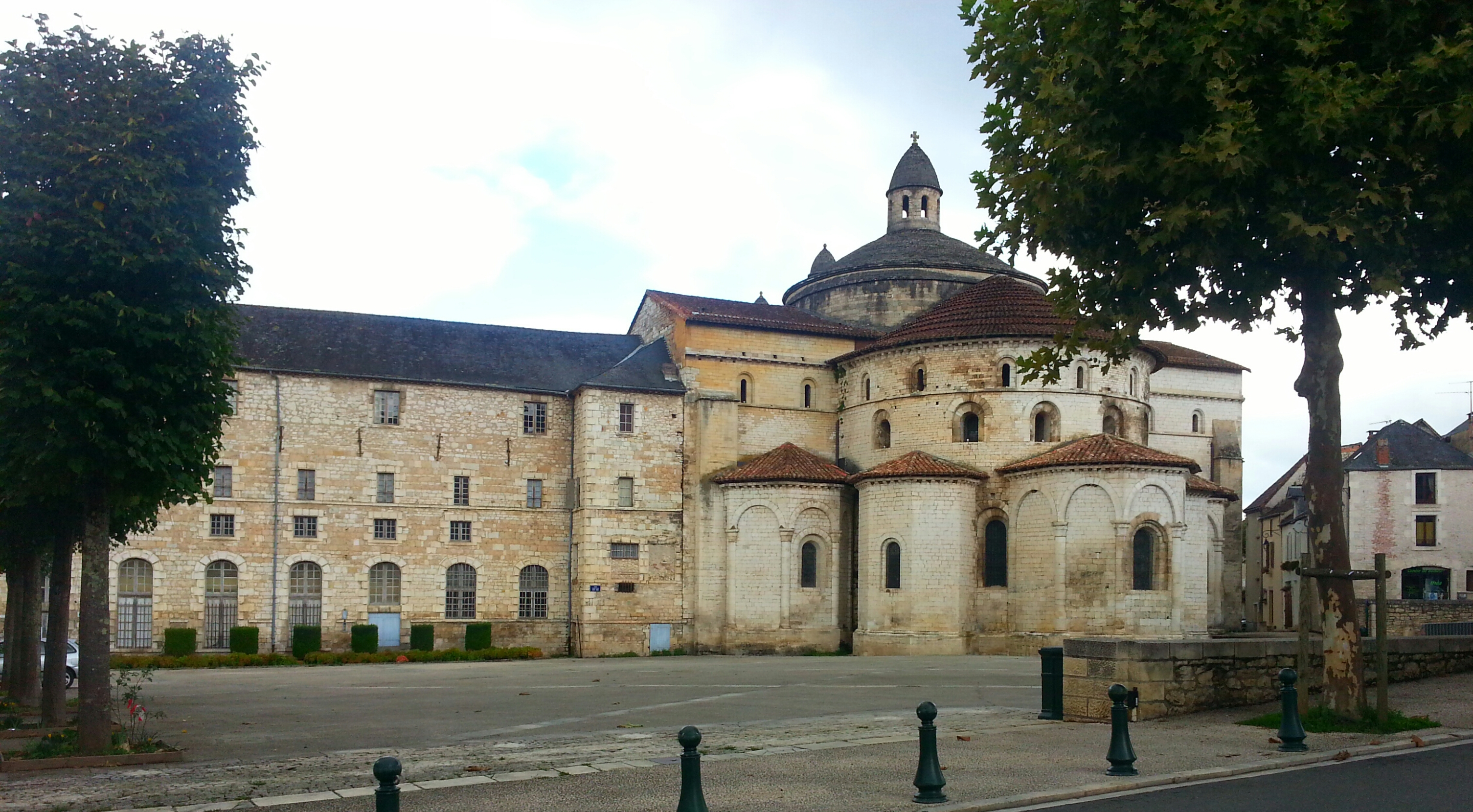
Abbey buildings

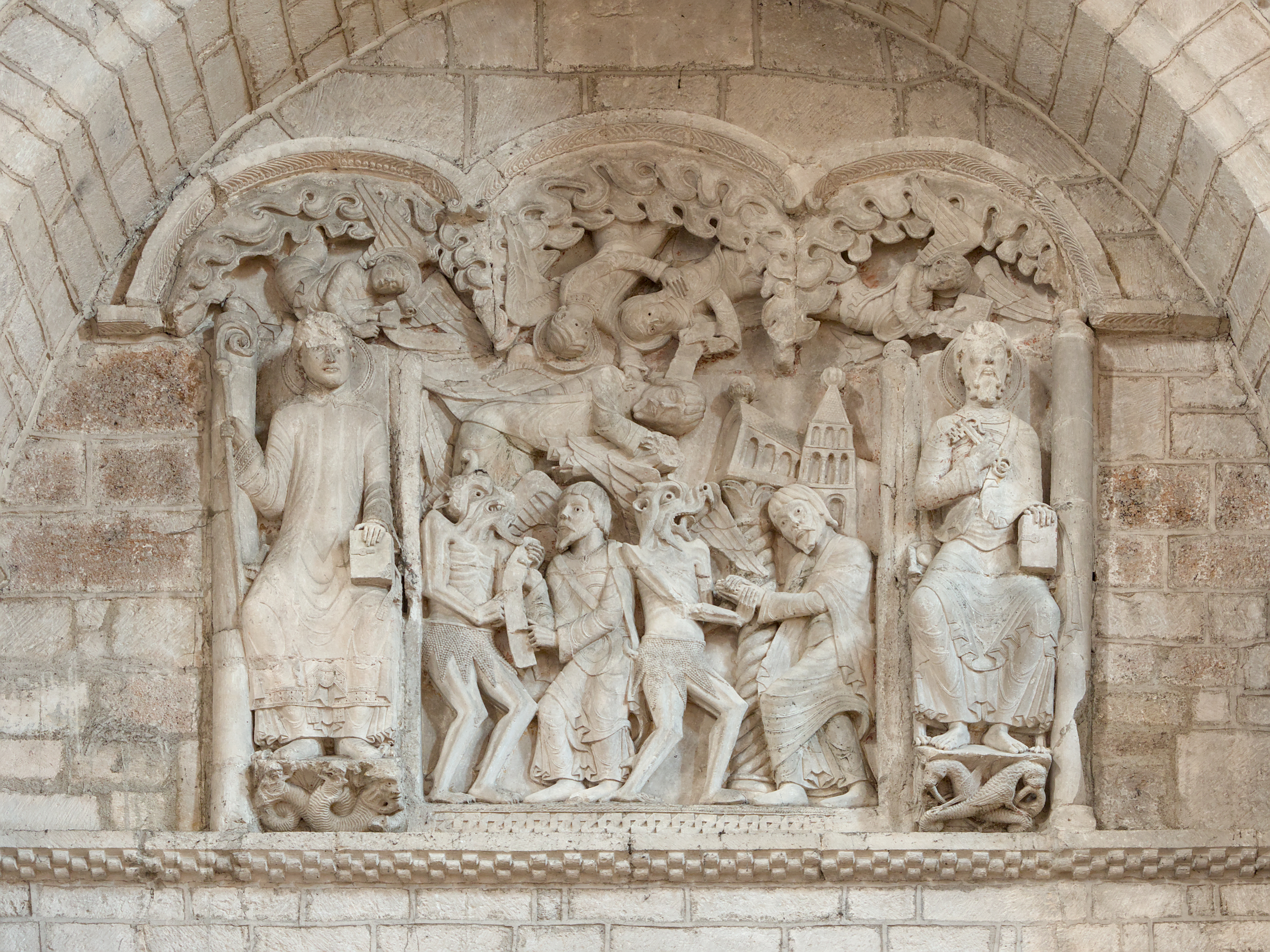
Relief of Saint Benedict and Saint Peter surrounding monk Theophilus' miracle, on the 12th-century romanesque portal inside of St Mary's abbey church

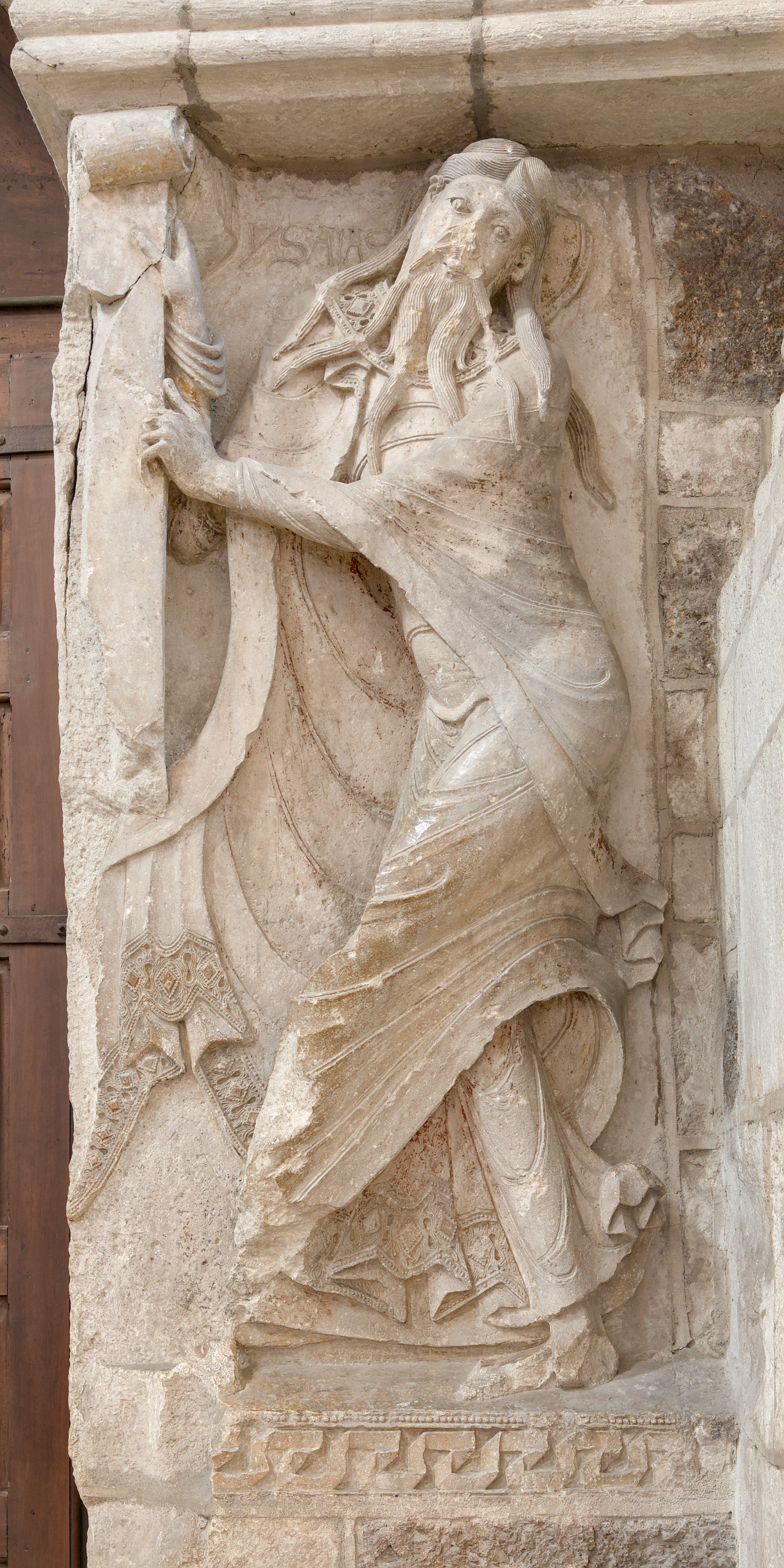
Relief of prophet Isaiah, on the 12th-century romanesque portal inside of St Mary's abbey church

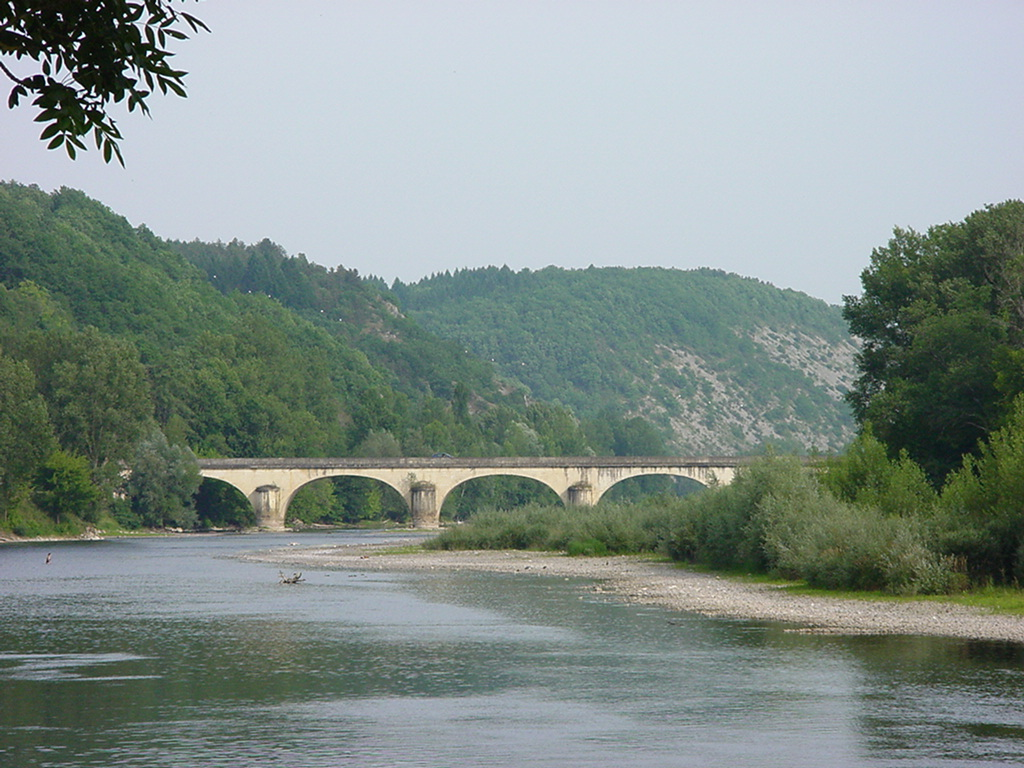
Dordogne River crossing

== See also ==
- Communes of the Lot department
