= Bazoches-sur-Vesles =

- Part of Bazoches-et-Saint-Thibaut
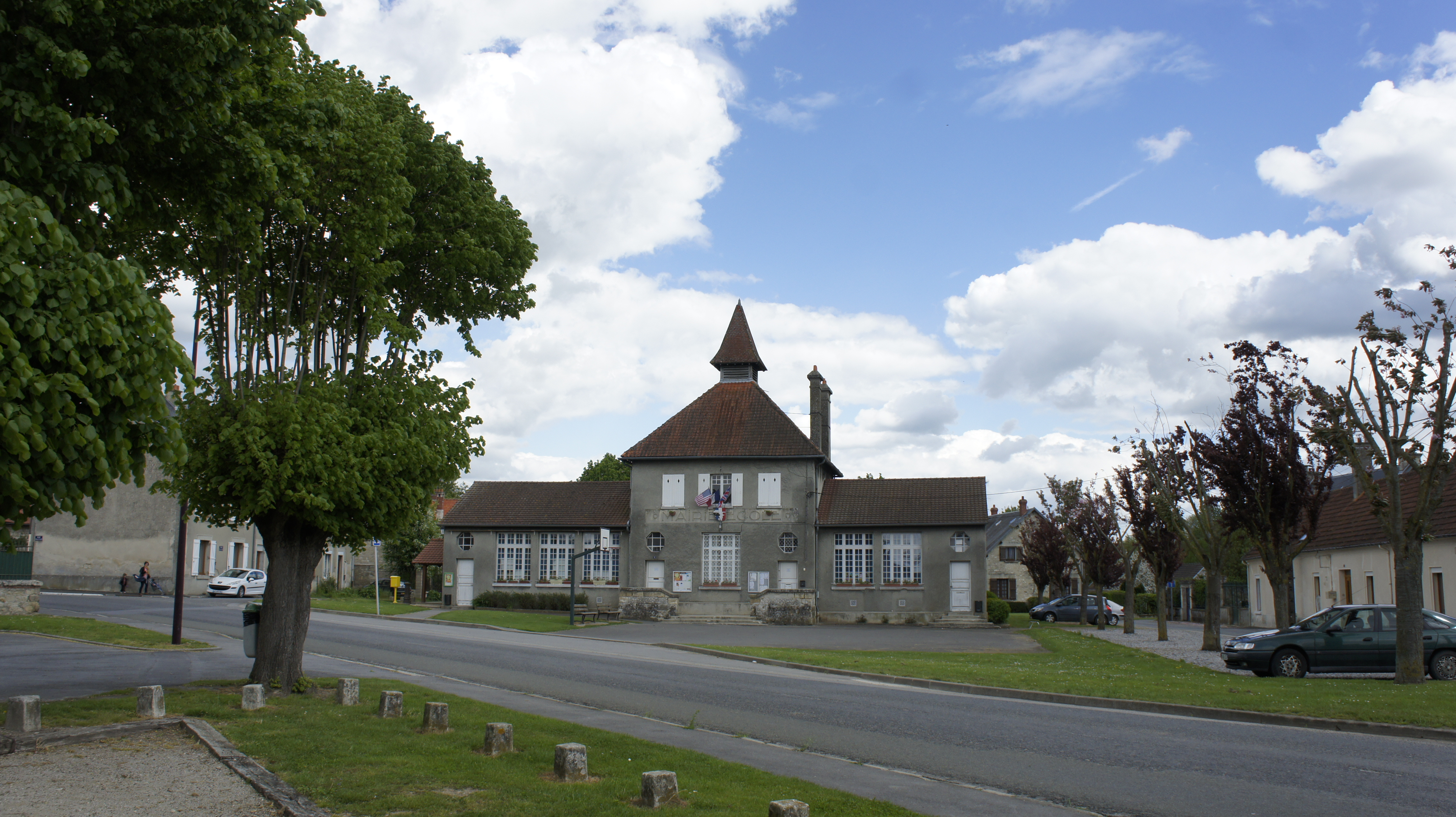
- Town hall
- Location of Bazoches-sur-Vesles
- Location within France Location within Hauts-de-France
- Coordinates: 49°18′28″N 3°37′10″E
- Country: France
- Region: Hauts-de-France
- Department: Aisne
- Arrondissement: Soissons
- Canton: Fère-en-Tardenois
- Commune: Bazoches-et-Saint-Thibaut
- Area^{1}: 9.49 km^{2} (3.66 sq mi)
- Elevation: 58 m (190 ft)
- Highest elevation: 174 m (571 ft)
- Lowest elevation: 52 m (171 ft)
- Population (2021): 439
  - Density: 46.3/km^{2} (120/sq mi)
- Time zone: UTC+01:00 (CET)
  - Summer (DST): UTC+02:00 (CEST)
- Postal code: 02220
- ^{1} French Land Register data, which excludes lakes, ponds, glaciers > 1 km^{2} (0.386 sq mi or 247 acres) and river estuaries.

Bazoches-sur-Vesles (French pronunciation: [bazɔʃ syʁ vɛl], literally Bazoches on Vesles, before 1943: Bazoches) is a former commune in the department of Aisne in the Hauts-de-France region of northern France. On 1 January 2022, it was merged into the new commune of Bazoches-et-Saint-Thibaut.

== Geography ==
Bazoches-sur-Vesles is located some 25 km east by southeast of Soissons and 30 km west by northwest of Rheims. It is traversed from east to west by National Route N31 (E46) passing just north of the village. The village can be accessed off the N31 on road D83 which continues southwest to Mont-Notre-Dame. The D484 branches east off the D83 to Saint-Thibaut. The commune is served by the SNCF railway line from Paris (Gare de l'Est) - La Ferte-Milon - Reims with a station just south of the village. The eastern border of the commune is also the border between Aisne and Marne departments. The commune is mostly farmland with scattered patches of forest.

The Vesle river forms part of the southern border of the commune before flowing west through the commune then forming the western border and continuing on to join the Aisne near Condé-sur-Aisne. There are several lakes or reservoirs to the west of the town.

== History ==
The Roman prefects of Gaul had a palace in the area.

Bazoches-sur-Vesle was the site of intense combat between American and German troops during the Vesle campaign of the First World War, in July–August 1918.

== Administration ==
List of Successive Mayors of Bazoches-sur-Vesles

From	To	Name	Party
2001	2008	Hervé Gironnay	DVG
2008	2014	Denis Yvanes	
2014	2020	Nicolas Demoury	DVD
2020	2021	Christian Drouet	

== Population ==
Historical population
Year	Pop.	±% p.a.
2006	440	—
2011	464	+1.07%
2015	465	+0.05%
2021	439	−0.95%
Source: INSEE

== Culture and heritage ==
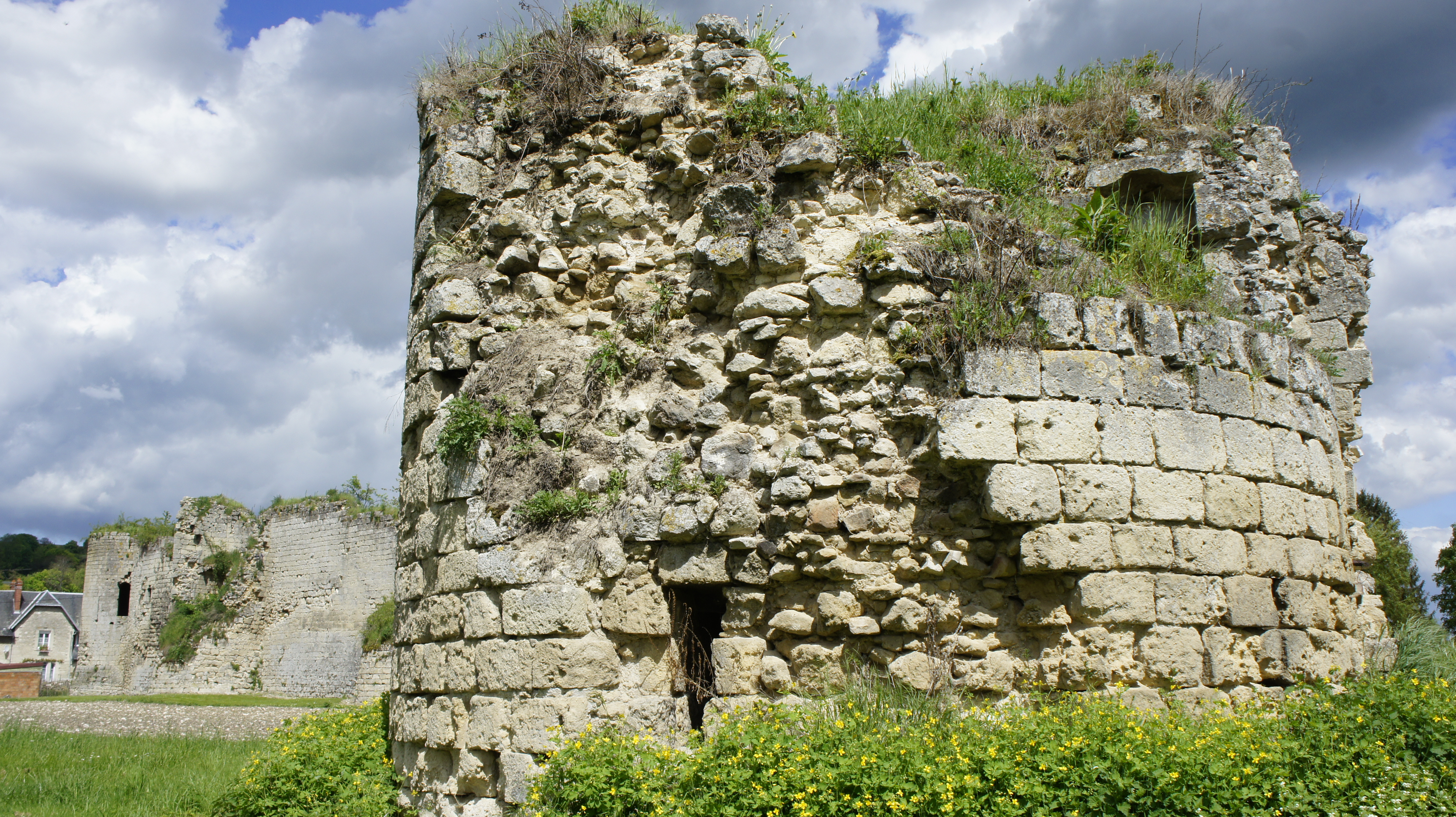
A view of the Castle ruins

=== Civil heritage ===
The commune has a number of buildings and structures that are registered as historical monuments:

- An old Chateau (13th century)

=== Religious heritage ===
The Parish Church of Saint Peter (12th century) is registered as an historical monument. It contains many items that are registered as historical objects:

- A Baptismal bowl
- 2 Tombstones for Anne de Linanges (1560), wife of Claude de Boussu, and for Nicolas de Boussu (1572)
- A Tombstone and carved effigy of Anne de Linanges (1560)
- A Baptismal font (12th century)
- A Tombstone and carved effigy of Nicolas de Boussu (1573)
- The Furniture in the Church
- The Retable in the niche of the Altar of the Virgin (18th century)
- A Chalice (19th century)
- A Chasse of Saint Rufin or Saint Valère (19th century)
- A Stoup (16th century)
- An Altar Painting: Saint évêque (18th century)
- A Statue: Sainte-Barbe (16th century)
- A Statue: The Virgin (16th century)
- A Statue: Virgin and child (18th century)
- A Mosaic: Annunciation (20th century)
- The main Altar Retable and Sacristy Enclosure (17th century)

== Picture gallery ==
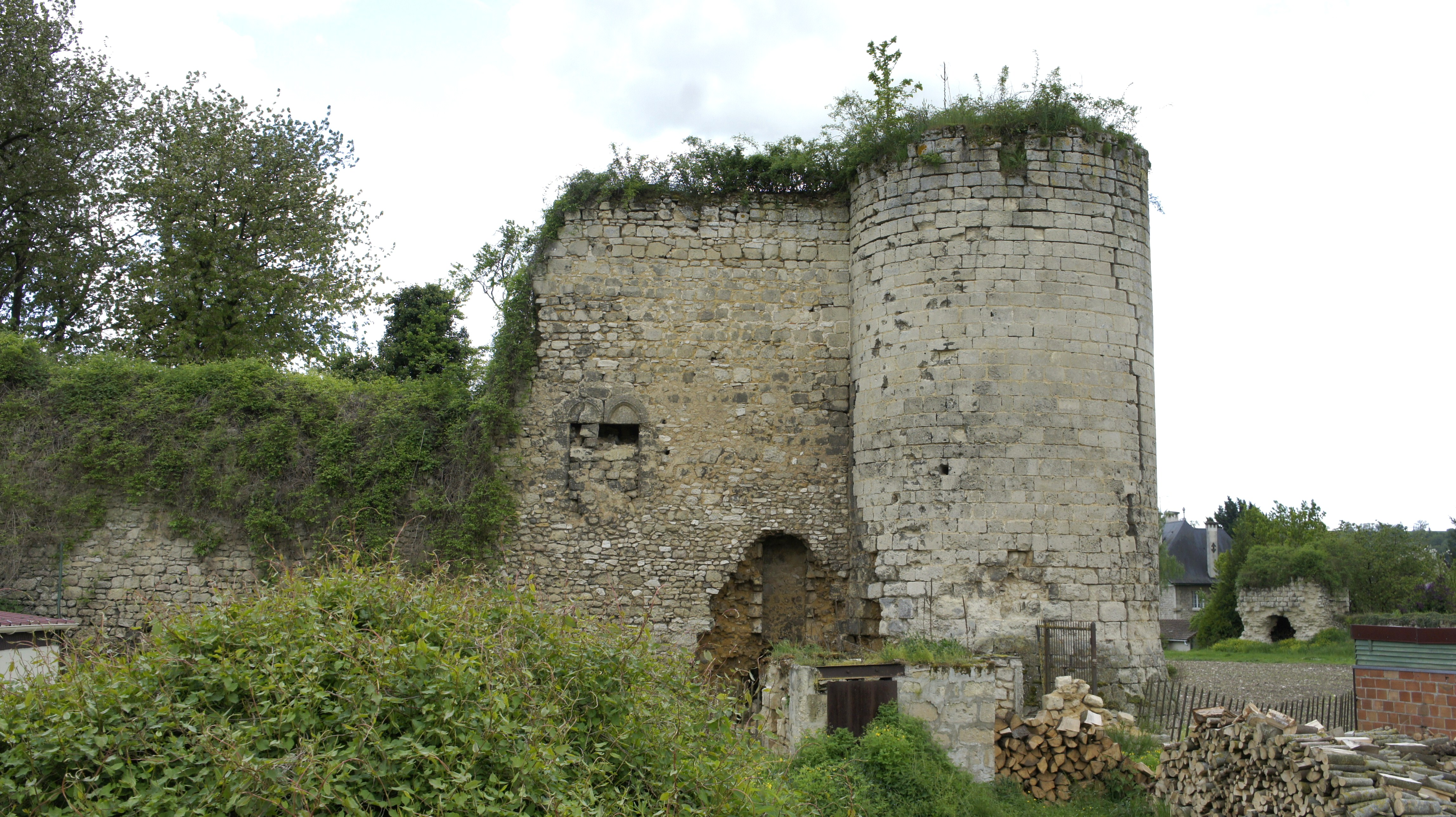
A view of the castle ruins.

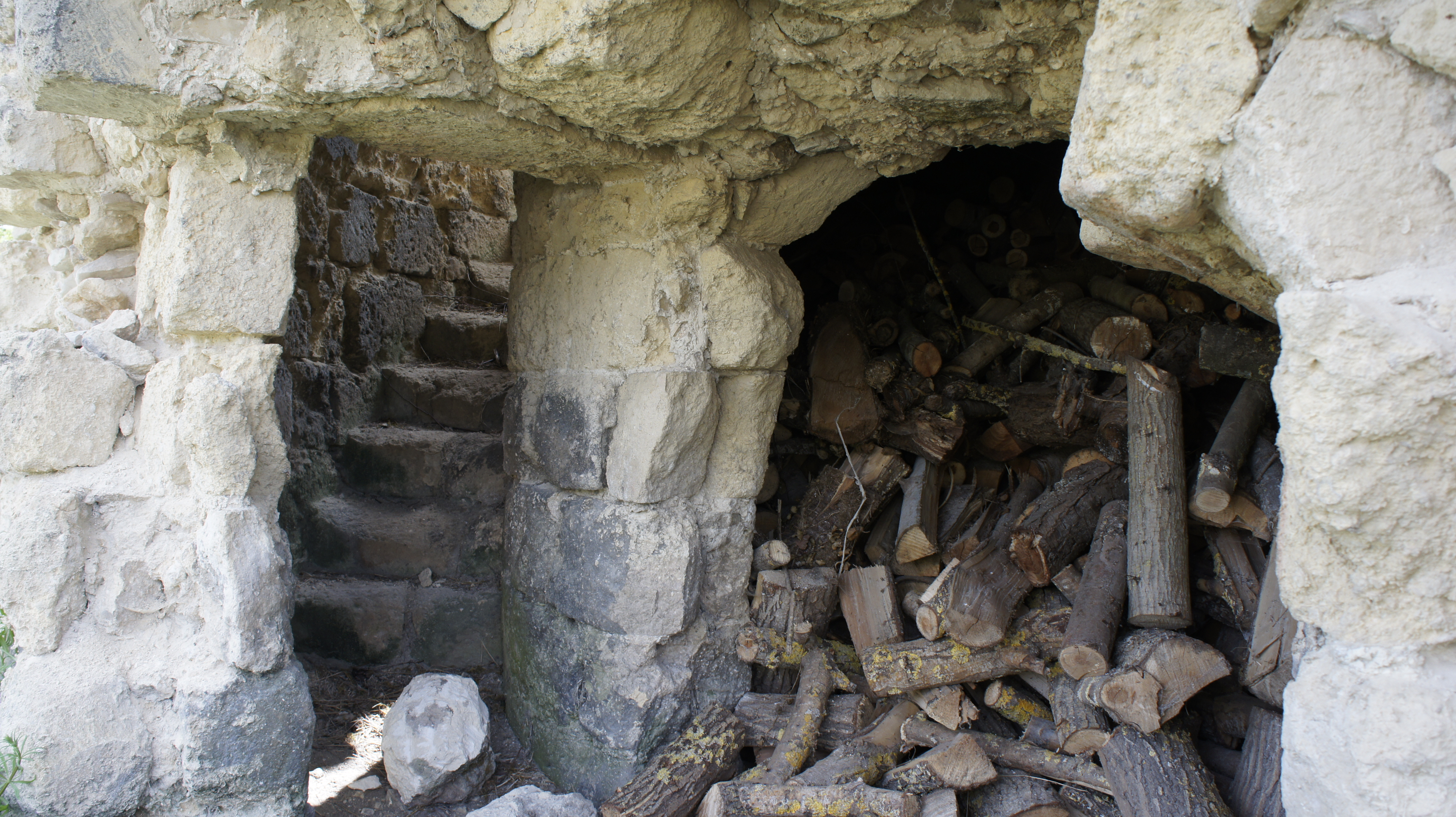
Detail of the south-west tower

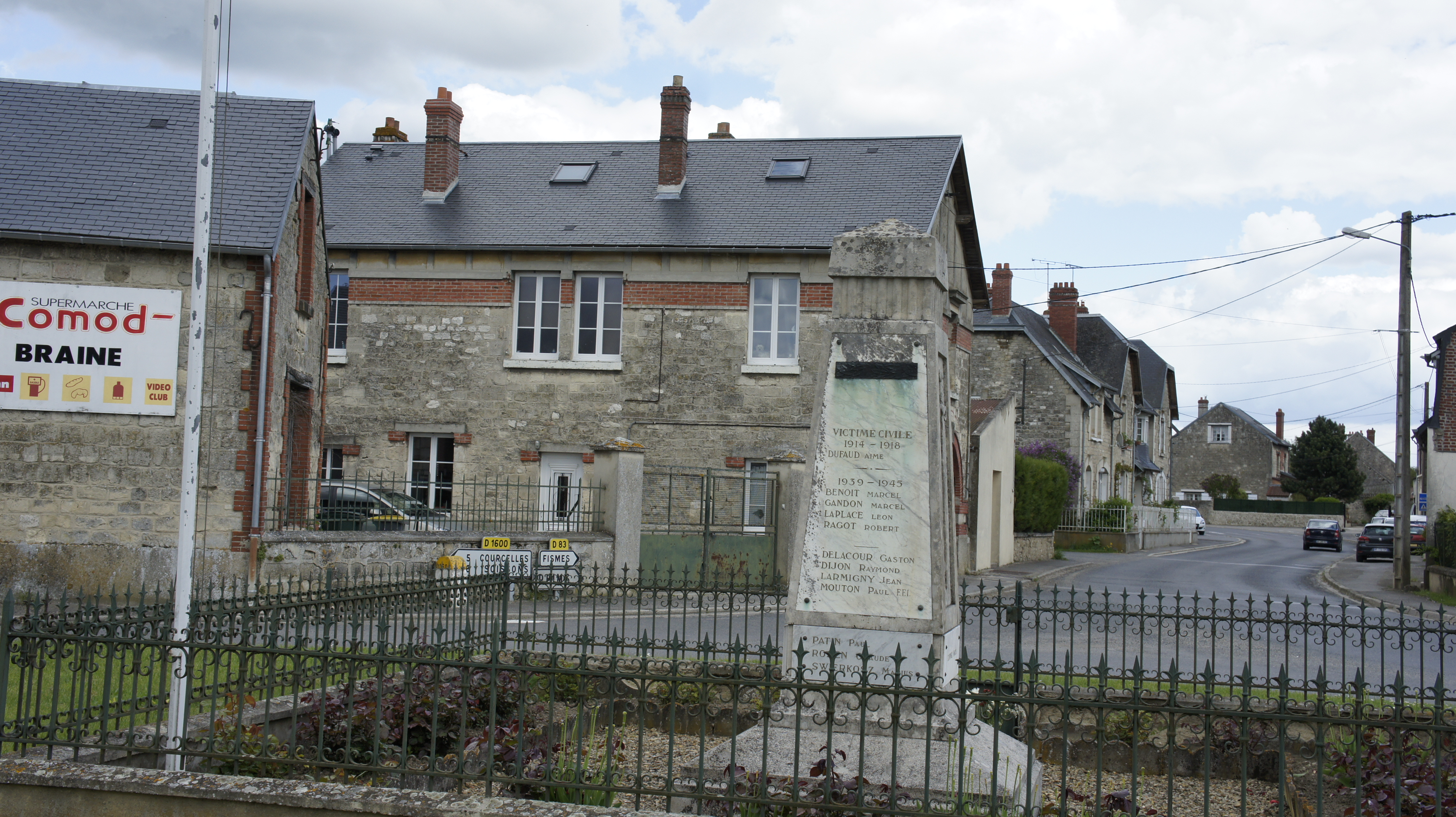
The war memorial

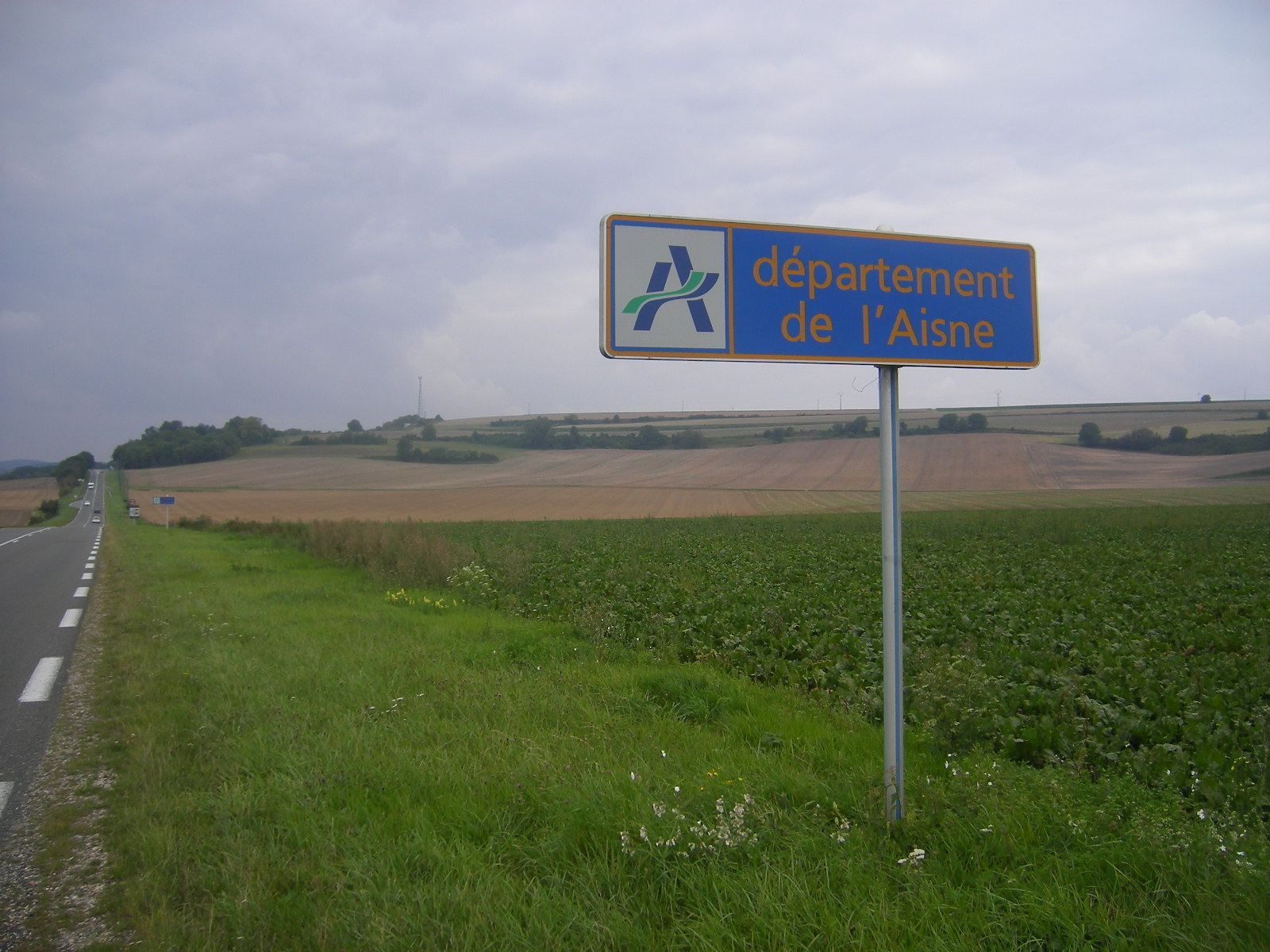
Border of Bazoches-sur-Vesles

== See also ==
- Communes of the Aisne department
