= Villers-sous-Montrond =

- Part of Les Monts-Ronds
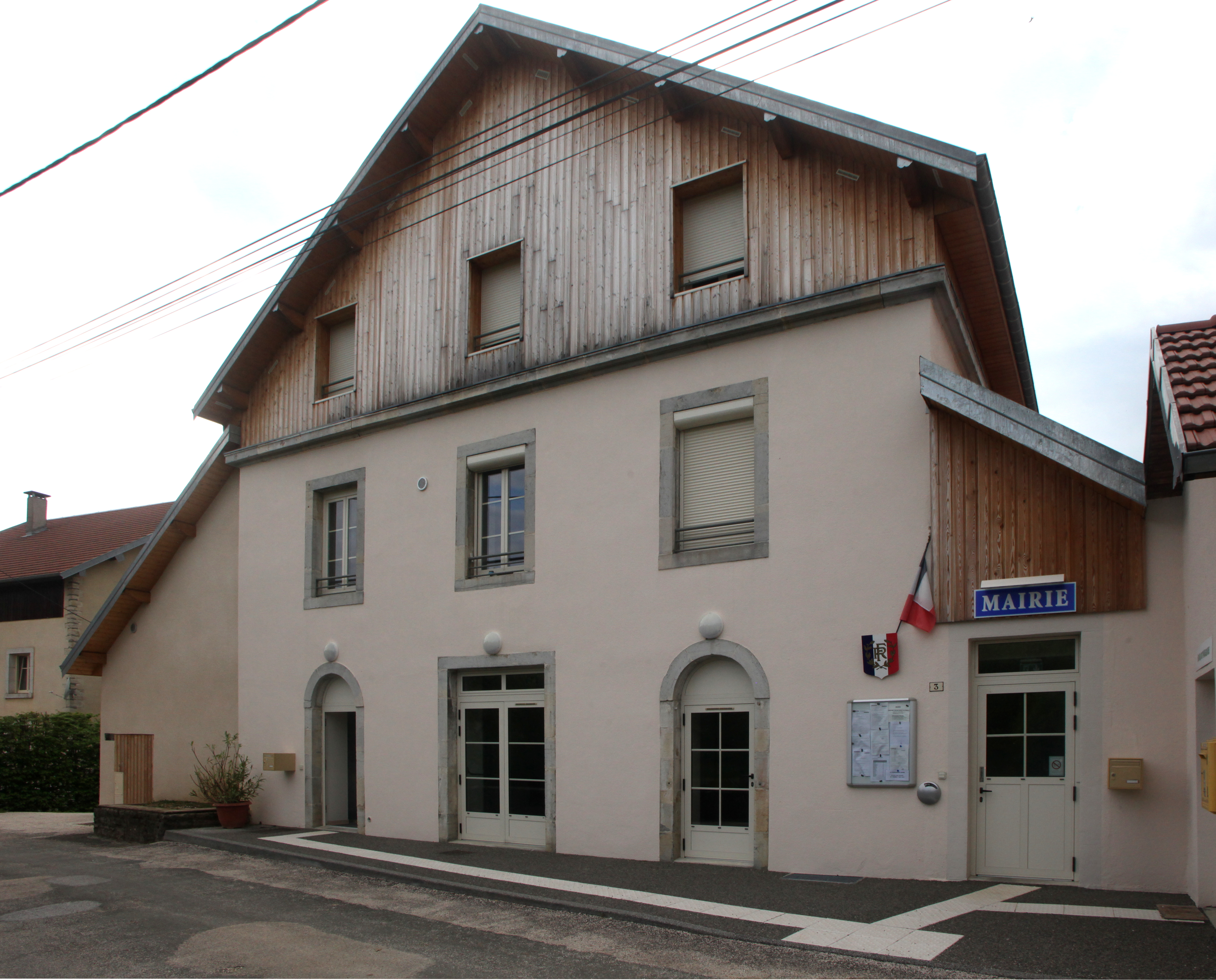
- The town hall in Villers-sous-Montrond
- Location of Villers-sous-Montrond
- Location within France Location within Bourgogne-Franche-Comté
- Coordinates: 47°08′45″N 6°05′21″E
- Country: France
- Region: Bourgogne-Franche-Comté
- Department: Doubs
- Arrondissement: Besançon
- Canton: Ornans
- Commune: Les Monts-Ronds
- Area^{1}: 6.33 km^{2} (2.44 sq mi)
- Highest elevation: 624 m (2,047 ft)
- Lowest elevation: 444 m (1,457 ft)
- Population (2019): 210
  - Density: 33/km^{2} (86/sq mi)
- Time zone: UTC+01:00 (CET)
  - Summer (DST): UTC+02:00 (CEST)
- Postal code: 25620
- ^{1} French Land Register data, which excludes lakes, ponds, glaciers > 1 km^{2} (0.386 sq mi or 247 acres) and river estuaries.

Villers-sous-Montrond (French pronunciation: [vilɛʁ su mɔ̃tʁɔ̃], literally Villers on Montrond) is a former commune in the Doubs department in the Bourgogne-Franche-Comté region in eastern France. On 1 January 2022, it was merged into the new commune of Les Monts-Ronds.

== See also ==
- Montrond-le-Château
- Communes of the Doubs department
