= Bazoches-et-Saint-Thibaut =

- Commune
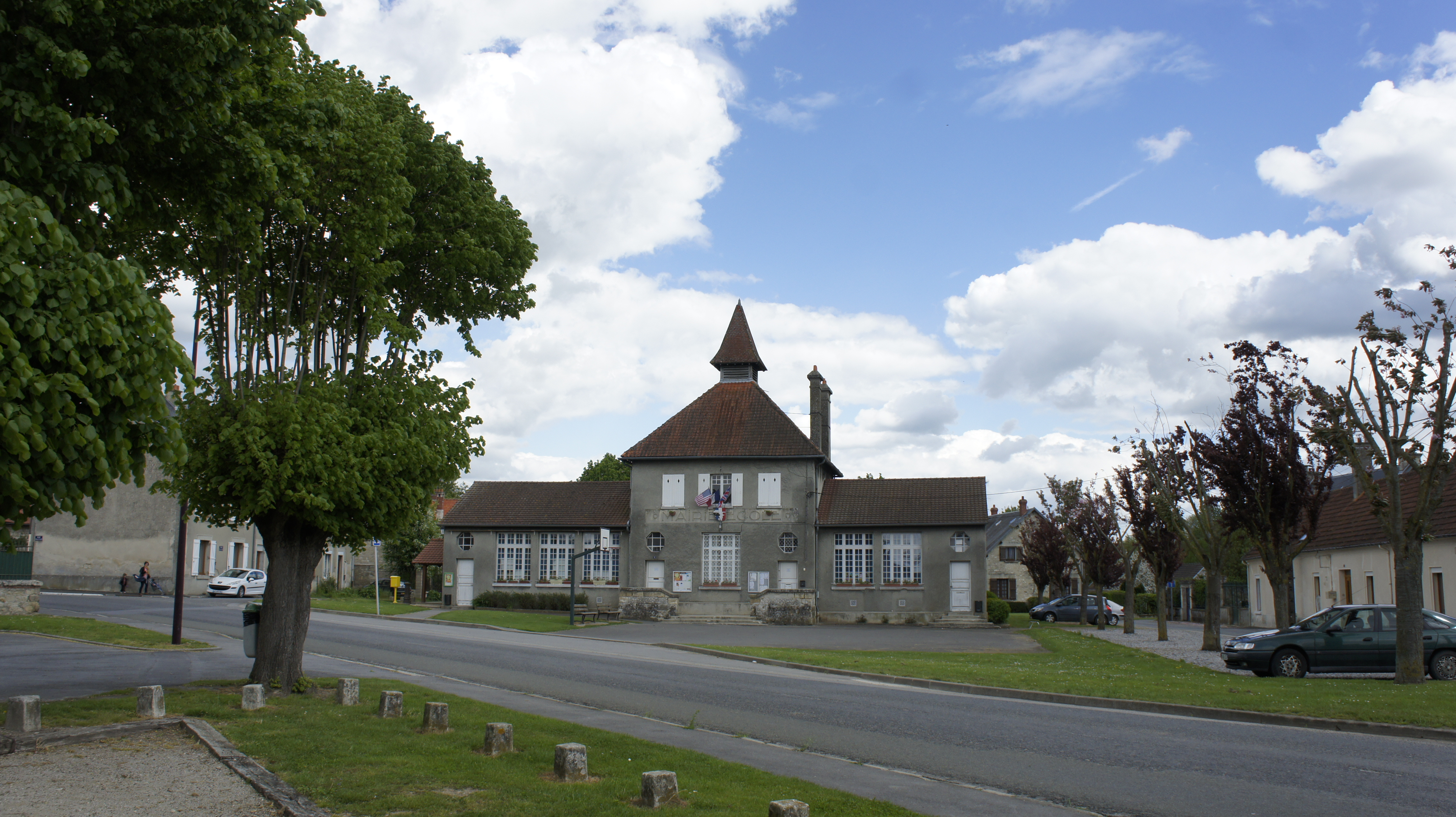
- Town hall of the commune nouvelle in Bazoches-sur-Vesles
- Location of Bazoches-et-Saint-Thibaut
- Location within France Location within Hauts-de-France
- Coordinates: 49°18′28″N 3°37′10″E
- Country: France
- Region: Hauts-de-France
- Department: Aisne
- Arrondissement: Soissons
- Canton: Fère-en-Tardenois
- Intercommunality: CC du Val de l'Aisne

Government
  - Mayor (2026–32): Sébastien Mercier
- Area^{1}: 13.62 km^{2} (5.26 sq mi)
- Highest elevation: 174 m (571 ft)
- Lowest elevation: 52 m (171 ft)
- Population (2023): 516
  - Density: 37.9/km^{2} (98.1/sq mi)
- Time zone: UTC+01:00 (CET)
  - Summer (DST): UTC+02:00 (CEST)
- INSEE/Postal code: 02054 /02220
- ^{1} French Land Register data, which excludes lakes, ponds, glaciers > 1 km^{2} (0.386 sq mi or 247 acres) and river estuaries.

Bazoches-et-Saint-Thibaut (French pronunciation: [bazɔʃ e sɛ̃ tibo]) is a commune in the Aisne department in Hauts-de-France in northern France. It is the result of the merger, on 1 January 2022, of the communes of Bazoches-sur-Vesles and Saint-Thibaut.

== Politics and administration ==
List of delegated communes of Bazoches-et-Saint-Thibaut
| Delegated Commune | INSEE code | Intercommunality | Area (km^{2}) | Population (2019) | Density (per km^{2}) |
|---|---|---|---|---|---|
| Bazoches-sur-Vesles | 02054 | CC du Val de l'Aisne | 9.49 | 461 | 49 |
| Saint-Thibaut | 02695 | CC du Val de l'Aisne | 4.13 | 81 | 20 |

== Local culture and heritage ==
- Église Saint-Pierre de Bazoches-sur-Vesles

== See also ==
- Communes of the Aisne department
- List of new French communes created in 2022
