= Saint-Gérand-Croixanvec =

Saint-Gérand-Croixanvec Sant-Jelan-Kroeshañveg
- Commune
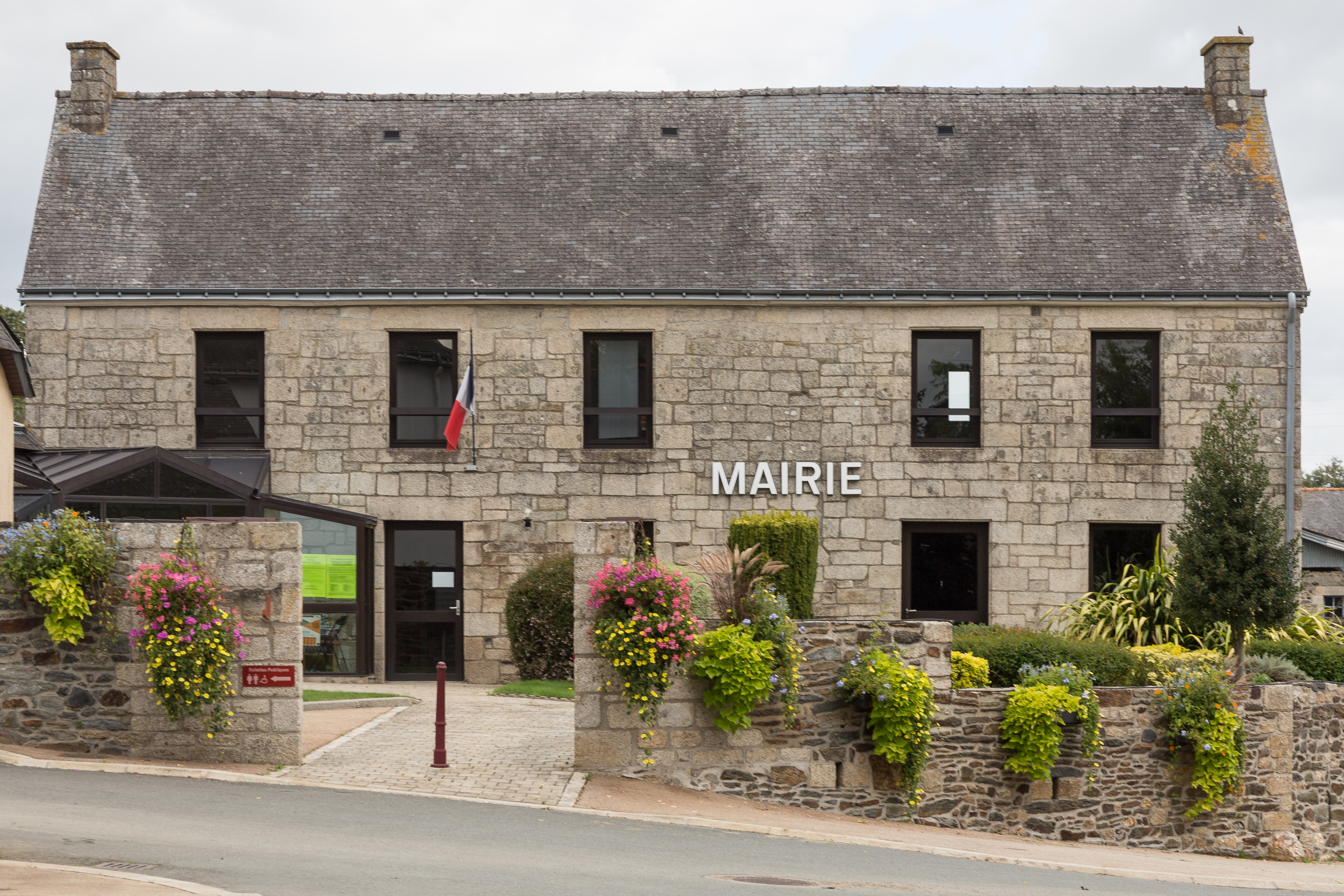
- Saint-Gérand-Croixanvec Town hall
- Location of Saint-Gérand-Croixanvec
- Location within France Location within Brittany
- Coordinates: 48°06′33″N 2°53′14″W
- Country: France
- Region: Brittany
- Department: Morbihan
- Arrondissement: Pontivy
- Canton: Pontivy
- Intercommunality: Pontivy Communauté

Government
  - Mayor (2026–32): Claude-Albert Lebris
- Area^{1}: 24.14 km^{2} (9.32 sq mi)
- Highest elevation: 162 m (531 ft)
- Lowest elevation: 82 m (269 ft)
- Population (2023): 1,312
  - Density: 54.35/km^{2} (140.8/sq mi)
- Time zone: UTC+01:00 (CET)
  - Summer (DST): UTC+02:00 (CEST)
- INSEE/Postal code: 56213 /56920
- ^{1} French Land Register data, which excludes lakes, ponds, glaciers > 1 km^{2} (0.386 sq mi or 247 acres) and river estuaries.

Saint-Gérand-Croixanvec (French pronunciation: [sɛ̃ ʒeʁɑ̃ kʁwasɑ̃vɛk]; Breton: Sant-Jelan-Kroeshañveg) is a commune in the Morbihan department of Brittany in north-western France. It is close to the larger town of Pontivy.

It was established on 1 January 2022 from the amalgamation of the communes of Saint-Gérand and Croixanvec.

== See also ==
- Communes of the Morbihan department
