= Croixanvec =

Commune in Brittany, France

Croixanvec Kroeshañveg
- Part of Saint-Gérand-Croixanvec
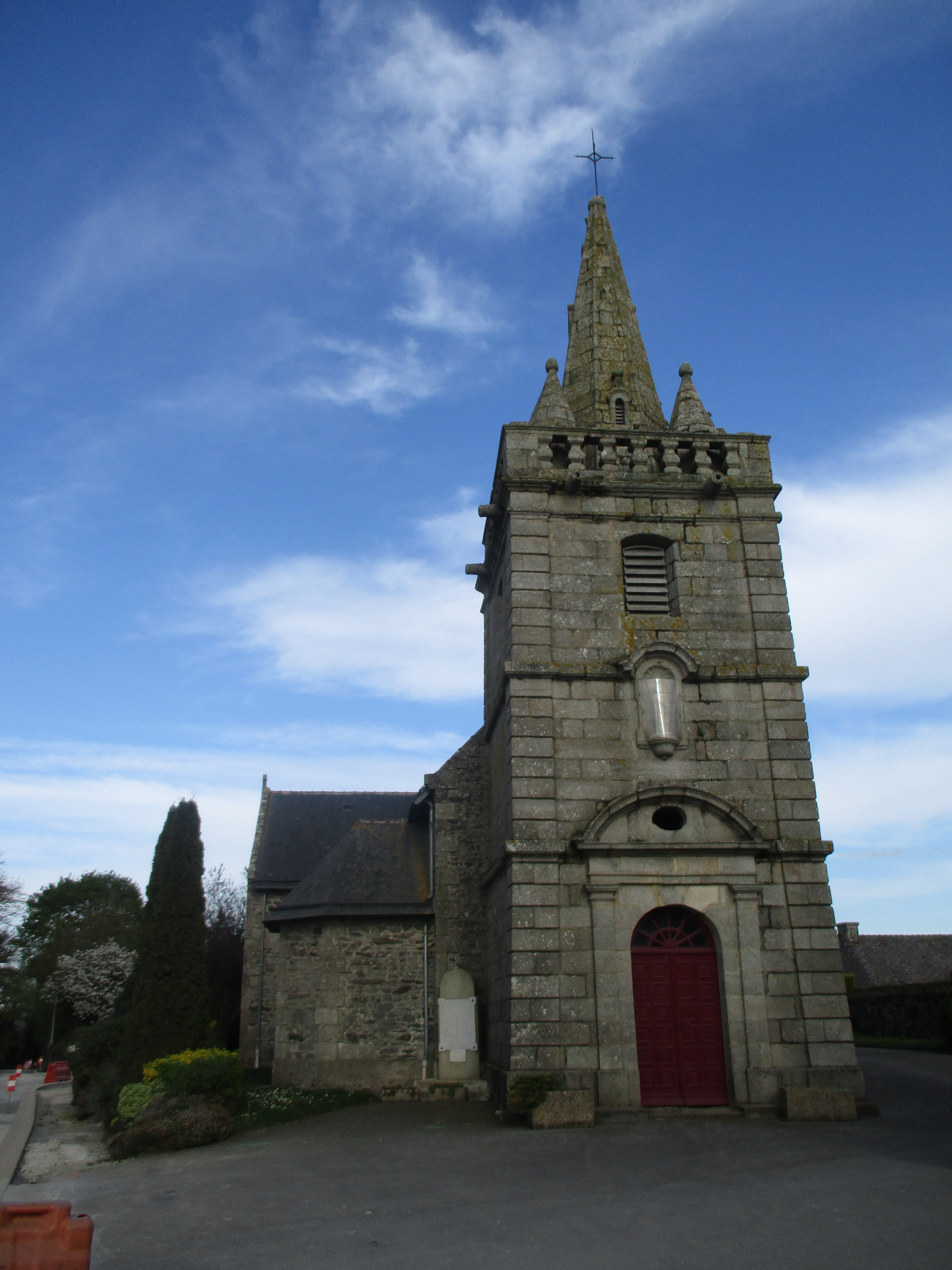
- The Saint-Samson-et-Saint-Maurice church in Croixanvec
- Location of Croixanvec
- Location within France Location within Brittany
- Coordinates: 48°08′25″N 2°52′05″W
- Country: France
- Region: Brittany
- Department: Morbihan
- Arrondissement: Pontivy
- Canton: Pontivy
- Commune: Saint-Gérand-Croixanvec
- Area^{1}: 6.09 km^{2} (2.35 sq mi)
- Highest elevation: 162 m (531 ft)
- Lowest elevation: 108 m (354 ft)
- Population (2022): 181
  - Density: 29.7/km^{2} (77.0/sq mi)
- Time zone: UTC+01:00 (CET)
  - Summer (DST): UTC+02:00 (CEST)
- Postal code: 56920
- ^{1} French Land Register data, which excludes lakes, ponds, glaciers > 1 km^{2} (0.386 sq mi or 247 acres) and river estuaries.

Croixanvec (French pronunciation: [kʁwasɑ̃vɛk]; Breton: Kroeshañveg) is a former commune in the Morbihan department of Brittany in north-western France. On 1 January 2022, it was merged into the new commune Saint-Gérand-Croixanvec.

== Demographics ==
Inhabitants of Croixanvec are called in French Croixanvequois.

== See also ==
- Communes of the Morbihan department
