= Pechs-de-l'Espérance =

- Commune
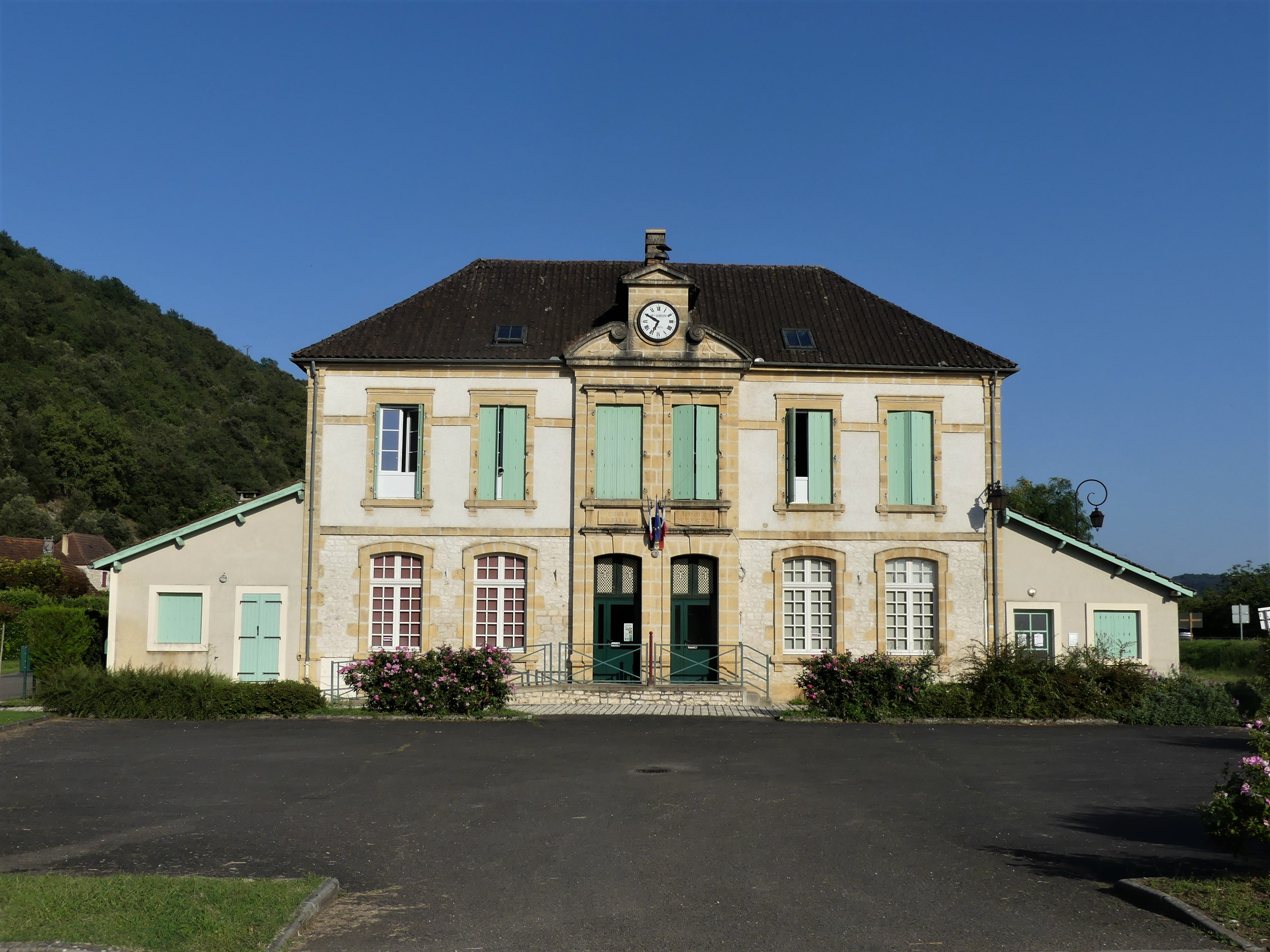
- Location of Pechs-de-l'Espérance
- Location within France Location within Nouvelle-Aquitaine
- Coordinates: 44°53′08″N 1°24′33″E
- Country: France
- Region: Nouvelle-Aquitaine
- Department: Dordogne
- Arrondissement: Sarlat-la-Canéda
- Canton: Terrasson-Lavilledieu
- Intercommunality: Pays de Fénelon

Government
  - Mayor (2023–2026): Patrick Prugnaud
- Area^{1}: 19.69 km^{2} (7.60 sq mi)
- Highest elevation: 323 m (1,060 ft)
- Lowest elevation: 80 m (260 ft)
- Population (2023): 796
  - Density: 40.4/km^{2} (105/sq mi)
- Time zone: UTC+01:00 (CET)
  - Summer (DST): UTC+02:00 (CEST)
- INSEE/Postal code: 24325 /24370
- ^{1} French Land Register data, which excludes lakes, ponds, glaciers > 1 km^{2} (0.386 sq mi or 247 acres) and river estuaries.

Pechs-de-l'Espérance (French pronunciation: [pɛk də lɛspeʁɑ̃s]; Occitan: Puegs de l'Esperança) is a commune in the Dordogne department in Nouvelle-Aquitaine in southwestern France. It is the result of the merger, on 1 January 2022, of the communes of Cazoulès, Orliaguet and Peyrillac-et-Millac.

== See also ==
- Communes of the Dordogne department
