= Saint-Gérand =

Commune in Morbihan, France

Saint-Gérand Sant-Jelan
- Part of Saint-Gérand-Croixanvec
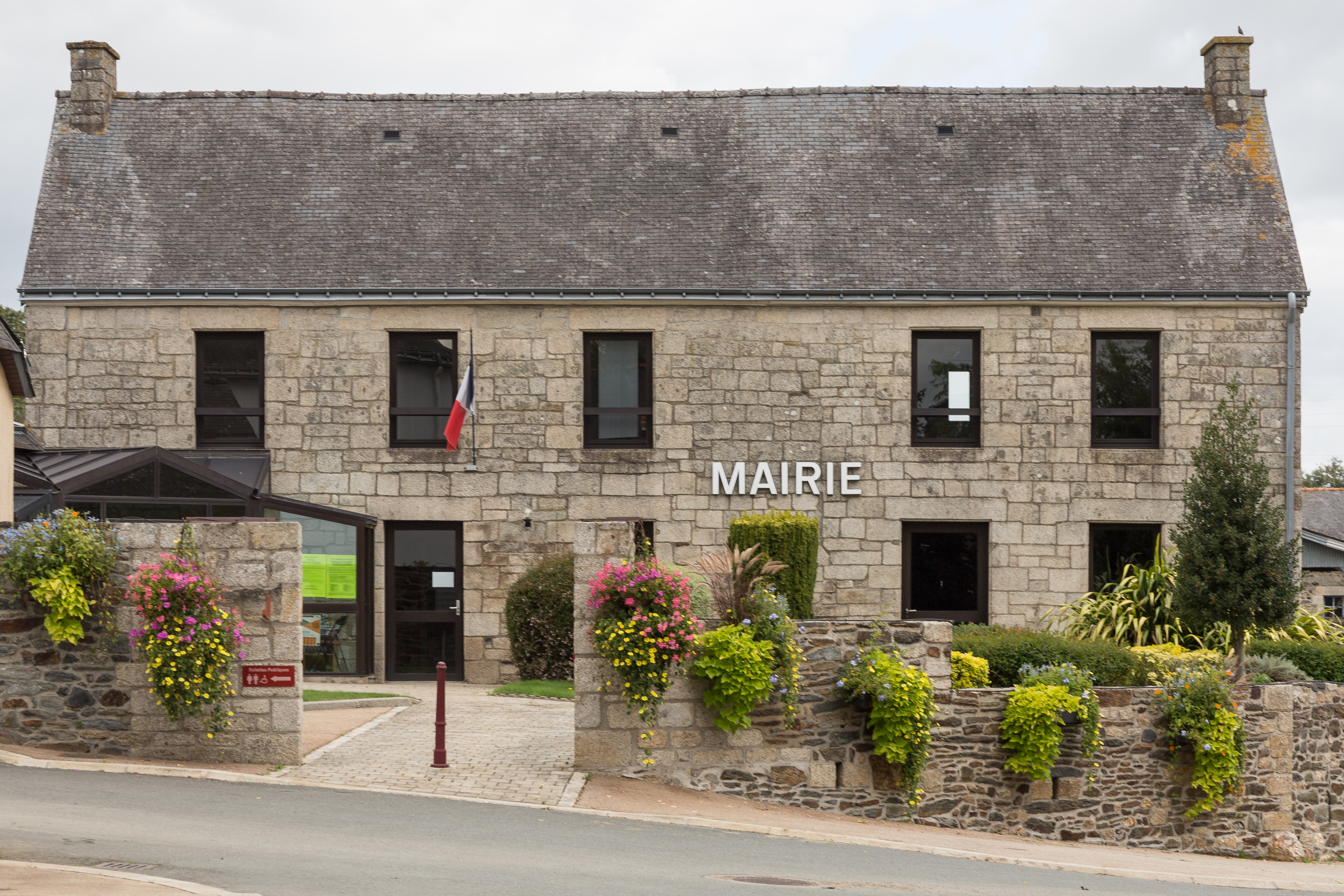
- The Town hall of Saint-Gérand.
- Location of Saint-Gérand
- Location within France Location within Brittany
- Coordinates: 48°06′33″N 2°53′13″W
- Country: France
- Region: Brittany
- Department: Morbihan
- Arrondissement: Pontivy
- Canton: Pontivy
- Commune: Saint-Gérand-Croixanvec
- Area^{1}: 18.05 km^{2} (6.97 sq mi)
- Highest elevation: 151 m (495 ft)
- Lowest elevation: 82 m (269 ft)
- Population (2022): 1,128
  - Density: 62.49/km^{2} (161.9/sq mi)
- Time zone: UTC+01:00 (CET)
  - Summer (DST): UTC+02:00 (CEST)
- Postal code: 56920
- ^{1} French Land Register data, which excludes lakes, ponds, glaciers > 1 km^{2} (0.386 sq mi or 247 acres) and river estuaries.

Saint-Gérand (French pronunciation: [sɛ̃ ʒeʁɑ̃]; Breton: Sant-Jelan) is a former commune in the Morbihan department of Brittany in north-western France. It is close to the larger town of Pontivy. On 1 January 2022, it was merged into the new commune Saint-Gérand-Croixanvec.

== Demographics ==
Inhabitants of Saint-Gérand are called in French Géranais.

== See also ==
- Communes of the Morbihan department
