= Les Monts-Ronds =

- Commune
- Location of Les Monts-Ronds
- Location within France Location within Bourgogne-Franche-Comté
- Coordinates: 47°09′08″N 6°04′10″E
- Country: France
- Region: Bourgogne-Franche-Comté
- Department: Doubs
- Arrondissement: Besançon
- Canton: Ornans
- Intercommunality: Loue-Lison

Government
  - Mayor (2022–2026): Didier Laithier
- Area^{1}: 17.12 km^{2} (6.61 sq mi)
- Highest elevation: 624 m (2,047 ft)
- Lowest elevation: 380 m (1,250 ft)
- Population (2023): 667
  - Density: 39.0/km^{2} (101/sq mi)
- Time zone: UTC+01:00 (CET)
  - Summer (DST): UTC+02:00 (CEST)
- INSEE/Postal code: 25375 /25620, 25660
- ^{1} French Land Register data, which excludes lakes, ponds, glaciers > 1 km^{2} (0.386 sq mi or 247 acres) and river estuaries.

Les Monts-Ronds (French pronunciation: [le mɔ̃ ʁɔ̃]) is a commune in the Doubs department in Bourgogne-Franche-Comté in eastern France. It is the result of the merger, on 1 January 2022, of the communes of Mérey-sous-Montrond and Villers-sous-Montrond.

== See also ==
- Communes of the Doubs department
