= Montaignac-sur-Doustre =

- Commune
- Location of Montaignac-sur-Doustre
- Location within France Location within Nouvelle-Aquitaine
- Coordinates: 45°21′17″N 1°58′47″E
- Country: France
- Region: Nouvelle-Aquitaine
- Department: Corrèze
- Arrondissement: Ussel
- Canton: Égletons
- Intercommunality: Ventadour - Égletons - Monédières

Government
  - Mayor (2022–2026): Jean Claude Besseau
- Area^{1}: 32.70 km^{2} (12.63 sq mi)
- Highest elevation: 682 m (2,238 ft)
- Lowest elevation: 504 m (1,654 ft)
- Population (2023): 633
  - Density: 19.4/km^{2} (50.1/sq mi)
- Time zone: UTC+01:00 (CET)
  - Summer (DST): UTC+02:00 (CEST)
- INSEE/Postal code: 19143 /19300
- ^{1} French Land Register data, which excludes lakes, ponds, glaciers > 1 km^{2} (0.386 sq mi or 247 acres) and river estuaries.

Montaignac-sur-Doustre (French pronunciation: [mɔ̃tɛɲak syʁ dustʁ]) is a commune in the Corrèze department in Nouvelle-Aquitaine in south-central France. It is the result of the merger, on 1 January 2022, of the communes of Montaignac-Saint-Hippolyte and Le Jardin. Montaignac-Saint-Hippolyte station has rail connections to Brive-la-Gaillarde, Ussel and Bordeaux.

== See also ==
- Communes of the Corrèze department
