= Montaignac-Saint-Hippolyte =

- Part of Montaignac-sur-Doustre
- Coat of arms
- Location of Montaignac-Saint-Hippolyte
- Location within France Location within Nouvelle-Aquitaine
- Coordinates: 45°21′17″N 1°58′47″E
- Country: France
- Region: Nouvelle-Aquitaine
- Department: Corrèze
- Arrondissement: Ussel
- Canton: Égletons
- Commune: Montaignac-sur-Doustre
- Area^{1}: 20.47 km^{2} (7.90 sq mi)
- Elevation: 600 m (2,000 ft)
- Highest elevation: 643 m (2,110 ft)
- Lowest elevation: 518 m (1,699 ft)
- Population (2019): 597
  - Density: 29.2/km^{2} (75.5/sq mi)
- Time zone: UTC+01:00 (CET)
  - Summer (DST): UTC+02:00 (CEST)
- Postal code: 19300
- ^{1} French Land Register data, which excludes lakes, ponds, glaciers > 1 km^{2} (0.386 sq mi or 247 acres) and river estuaries.

Montaignac-Saint-Hippolyte (French pronunciation: [mɔ̃tɛɲak sɛ̃.t‿ipɔlit]; Occitan: Montanhac) is a former commune in the Corrèze department in central France. On 1 January 2022, it was merged into the new commune of Montaignac-sur-Doustre.

== Population ==
Historical population
Year	Pop.	±% p.a.
1962	674	—
1968	681	+0.17%
1975	541	−3.23%
1982	579	+0.97%
1990	587	+0.17%
1999	565	−0.42%
2006	550	−0.38%
2019	597	+0.63%
Source: EHESS and INSEE

== See also ==
- Communes of the Corrèze department
