= Le Jardin =

- Part of Montaignac-sur-Doustre
- Coat of arms
- Location of Le Jardin
- Location within France Location within Nouvelle-Aquitaine
- Coordinates: 45°19′20″N 2°02′03″E
- Country: France
- Region: Nouvelle-Aquitaine
- Department: Corrèze
- Arrondissement: Ussel
- Canton: Égletons
- Commune: Montaignac-sur-Doustre
- Area^{1}: 12.23 km^{2} (4.72 sq mi)
- Elevation: 610 m (2,000 ft)
- Highest elevation: 682 m (2,238 ft)
- Lowest elevation: 504 m (1,654 ft)
- Population (2019): 77
  - Density: 6.3/km^{2} (16/sq mi)
- Time zone: UTC+01:00 (CET)
  - Summer (DST): UTC+02:00 (CEST)
- Postal code: 19300
- ^{1} French Land Register data, which excludes lakes, ponds, glaciers > 1 km^{2} (0.386 sq mi or 247 acres) and river estuaries.

Le Jardin (French pronunciation: [lə ʒaʁdɛ̃]; Occitan: Lo Jardenc) is a former commune in the Corrèze department in central France. On 1 January 2022, it was merged into the new commune of Montaignac-sur-Doustre.

== See also ==
- Communes of the Corrèze department
