= Montrond-le-Château =

- Commune
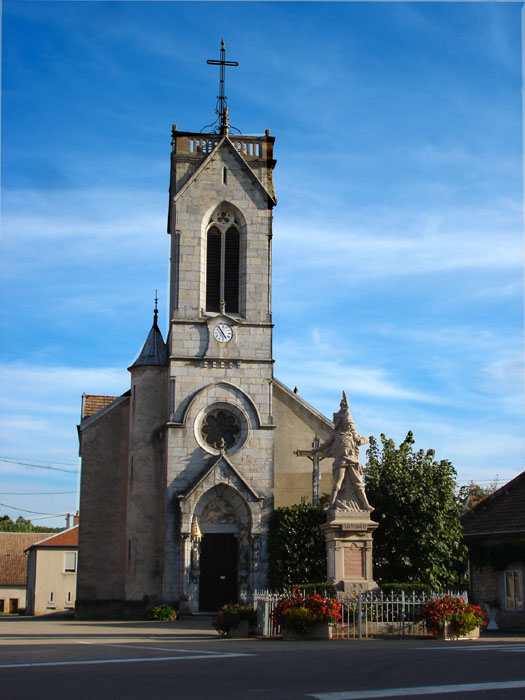
- The church in Montrond-le-Château

- Coat of arms
- Location of Montrond-le-Château
- Location within France Location within Bourgogne-Franche-Comté
- Coordinates: 47°08′39″N 6°02′48″E
- Country: France
- Region: Bourgogne-Franche-Comté
- Department: Doubs
- Arrondissement: Besançon
- Canton: Saint-Vit
- Intercommunality: Loue-Lison

Government
  - Mayor (2020–2026): Angèle Prillard
- Area^{1}: 10.9 km^{2} (4.2 sq mi)
- Highest elevation: 525 m (1,722 ft)
- Lowest elevation: 407 m (1,335 ft)
- Population (2023): 558
  - Density: 51.2/km^{2} (133/sq mi)
- Time zone: UTC+01:00 (CET)
  - Summer (DST): UTC+02:00 (CEST)
- INSEE/Postal code: 25406 /25660
- ^{1} French Land Register data, which excludes lakes, ponds, glaciers > 1 km^{2} (0.386 sq mi or 247 acres) and river estuaries.

Montrond-le-Château (French pronunciation: [mɔ̃tʁɔ̃ lə ʃato]) is a commune in the Doubs department in the Bourgogne-Franche-Comté region in eastern France.

== Geography ==
The commune lies 22 km (14 mi) northeast of Quingey.

== Population ==
Historical population
Year	Pop.	±% p.a.
1968	310	—
1975	279	−1.49%
1982	320	+1.98%
1990	393	+2.60%
1999	471	+2.03%
2007	563	+2.26%
2012	590	+0.94%
2017	561	−1.00%
2023	558	−0.09%
Source: INSEE

== See also ==
- Communes of the Doubs department
