= Saint-Thibaut =

Commune in Aisne, France

- Part of Bazoches-et-Saint-Thibaut
- Location of Saint-Thibaut
- Location within France Location within Hauts-de-France
- Coordinates: 49°18′01″N 3°37′06″E
- Country: France
- Region: Hauts-de-France
- Department: Aisne
- Arrondissement: Soissons
- Canton: Fère-en-Tardenois
- Commune: Bazoches-et-Saint-Thibaut
- Area^{1}: 4.13 km^{2} (1.59 sq mi)
- Elevation: 69 m (226 ft)
- Highest elevation: 168 m (551 ft)
- Lowest elevation: 56 m (184 ft)
- Population (2021): 85
  - Density: 21/km^{2} (53/sq mi)
- Time zone: UTC+01:00 (CET)
  - Summer (DST): UTC+02:00 (CEST)
- Postal code: 02220
- ^{1} French Land Register data, which excludes lakes, ponds, glaciers > 1 km^{2} (0.386 sq mi or 247 acres) and river estuaries.

Saint-Thibaut (French pronunciation: [sɛ̃ tibo]) is a former commune in the Aisne department in Hauts-de-France in northern France. On 1 January 2022, it was merged into the new commune of Bazoches-et-Saint-Thibaut.

Saint-Thibaut (abbreviated on local signage as St.-Thibaut) was the site of heavy fighting between American and German troops during the Vesle campaign (July–August 1918) of World War I.

== See also ==
- Communes of the Aisne department
