= Cazoulès =

- Part of Pechs-de-l'Espérance
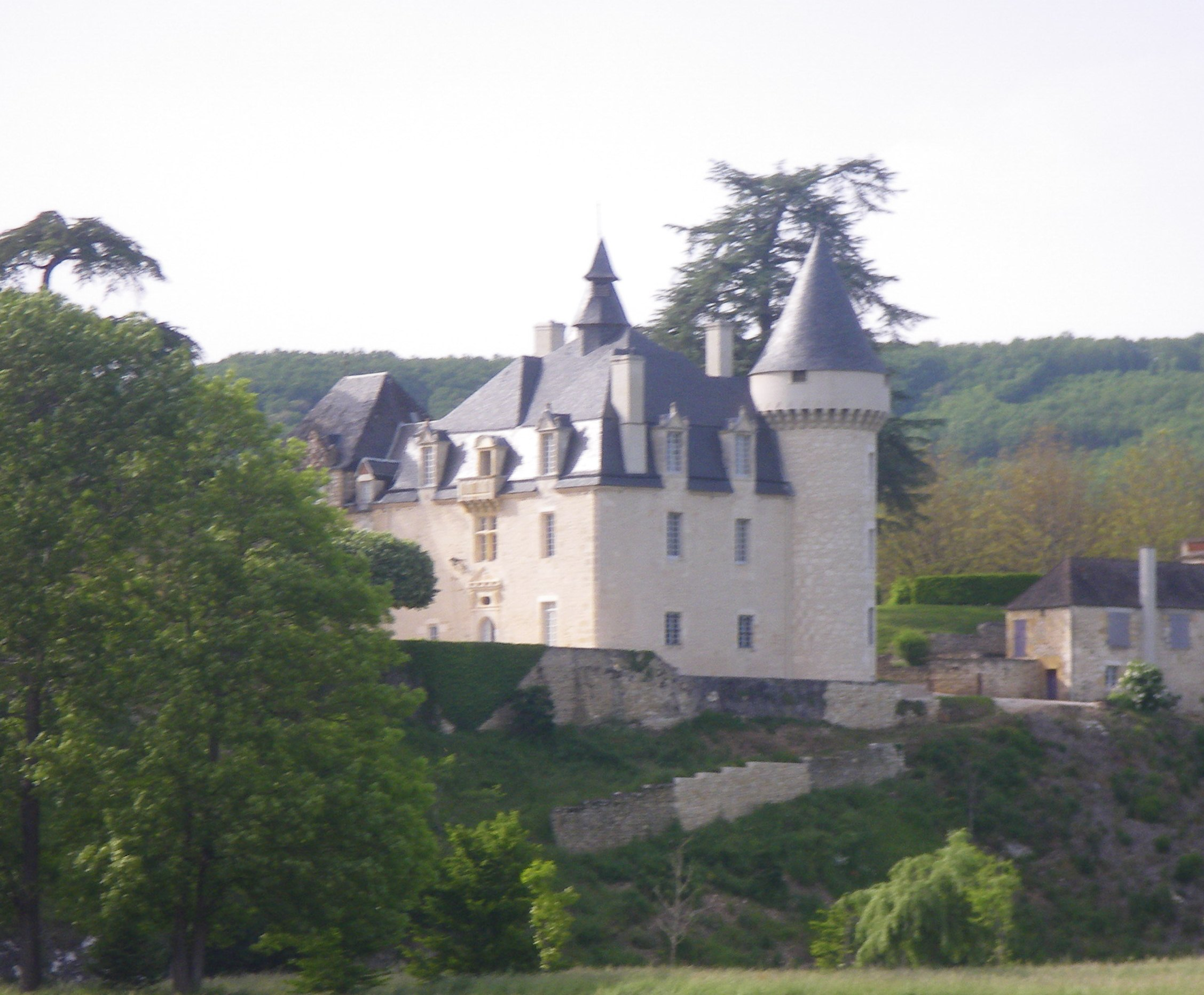
- Manor of La Font Haute

- Coat of arms
- Location of Cazoulès
- Location within France Location within Nouvelle-Aquitaine
- Coordinates: 44°53′02″N 1°26′05″E
- Country: France
- Region: Nouvelle-Aquitaine
- Department: Dordogne
- Arrondissement: Sarlat-la-Canéda
- Canton: Terrasson-Lavilledieu
- Commune: Pechs-de-l'Espérance
- Area^{1}: 3.52 km^{2} (1.36 sq mi)
- Elevation: 101 m (331 ft)
- Highest elevation: 294 m (965 ft)
- Lowest elevation: 84 m (276 ft)
- Population (2023): 460
  - Density: 130/km^{2} (340/sq mi)
- Time zone: UTC+01:00 (CET)
  - Summer (DST): UTC+02:00 (CEST)
- Postal code: 24370
- ^{1} French Land Register data, which excludes lakes, ponds, glaciers > 1 km^{2} (0.386 sq mi or 247 acres) and river estuaries.

Cazoulès (French pronunciation: [kazulɛs]; Occitan: Casolés) is a former commune in the Dordogne department in Nouvelle-Aquitaine in southwestern France. On 1 January 2022, it was merged into the new commune of Pechs-de-l'Espérance.

== See also ==
- Communes of the Dordogne department
