= List of new French communes created in 2021 =

This article contains a list of new French communes created in 2021, this is to say a list of new French communes for which prefectural decrees pronouncing their creation defined a date of creation between 1 January 2021 and 31 December 2021.

This list contains 2 new communes regrouping 5 previous communes.

== Legislative history ==
The law n^{o} 2010-1563 of 16 December 2010 to reform local authorities replaced the previous regime of merging communes defined in the "Marcellin" law of 16 July 1971 with a renewed consolidation procedure, resulting in the creation of a "new commune". It was supplemented in 2015 by a new law n^{o} 2015-292 of 16 March 2015 relating to the improvement of the regime of the new commune, for strong and lively communes, setting up temporary financial incentives in order to promote the creation of new municipalities before 1 January 2019.

== Enumeration ==
=== Number of new communes created in 2021 ===
2 new communes were created on 1 January 2021. They regrouped 5 former communes.

=== Total number of communes in France ===
On 1 March 2021, the French Republic counted 34,964 communes, of which 34,835 are located in metropolitan France and 129 in overseas departments and regions.

Year	Date	Metropolitan France			Overseas departments and regions	Total
Year	Date	New communes	Regrouped communes	Total # of communes	Overseas departments and regions	Total
2020	31 December 2020			34,838	129	34,967
2021	1 January 2021	2	5	34,835	129	34,964
2021	Total	2	5	34,835	129	34,964

== Detailed list ==
Article L. 2113-6 of the general code of local and regional authorities (CGCT) specifies that "the decree of the representative of the State in the department pronouncing the creation of the new municipality determines the name of the new municipality, if necessary in view of the opinions issued by the municipal councils, fixes the date of creation and in full, in as needed, the terms". The following table presents these indicators for each of the new communes created in 2021: name, date of the prefectural decree announcing its creation, date of creation and multiple modalities (existence of delegated communities, seat of the commune), or complementary information (population).

Department	#	New communes				Former Communes			Date of prefectural decree	Date of creation
Department	#	Name	Code INSEE	Seat	Population (2017)	#	Names	Delegated commune	Date of prefectural decree	Date of creation
Charente	1	Mosnac-Saint-Simeux	16233	Mosnac	1,045	2	Mosnac and Saint-Simeux	Yes	3 December 2020	1 January 2021
Mayenne	1	Vimartin-sur-Orthe	53249	Saint-Pierre-sur-Orthe	1,121	3	Saint-Martin-de-Connée, Saint-Pierre-sur-Orthe, and Vimarcé	Yes	23 December 2020	1 January 2021

== See also ==
=== Related articles ===
- List of new French commune projects
- List of new French communes created in 2015
- List of new French communes created in 2016
- List of new French communes created in 2017
- List of new French communes created in 2018
- List of new French communes created in 2019
- List of new French communes created in 2022
