= La Bazouge =

La Bazouge may refer to several communes in France:

- La Bazouge-de-Chemeré, Mayenne
- La Bazouge-des-Alleux, Mayenne
- La Bazouge-du-Désert, Ille-et-Vilaine, Brittany

== See also ==
- Bazouges (disambiguation)
- La Bazoge (disambiguation)
