= Mosnac =

Mosnac may refer to the following places in France:

- Mosnac, Charente, a former commune in the department of Charente
- Mosnac, Charente-Maritime, a commune in the department of Charente-Maritime
