= Neau =

Neau may refer to:

== People ==
- Elias Neau, French Huguenot
- Stéphanie Neau (born 1975), French sport shooter

== Places ==
- Neau River, Romania
- Neau, Mayenne, France
- Néau, Belgian city currently known as Eupen

== Other ==
- Northeast Agricultural University, China
