= Bazouges =

Bazouges may refer to:

- Bazouges, Château-Gontier, historically part of the Duchy of Anjou; a former commune in the Mayenne department in western France, subsumed into the former commune of Château-Gontier in 1990; now in Château-Gontier-sur-Mayenne, a commune established in 2019
- Bazouges Cré sur Loir, a commune in the department of Sarthe, northwestern France
- Bazouges-la-Pérouse, a commune in the Ille-et-Vilaine department in Brittany in northwestern France
- Bazouges-sur-le-Loir, a former commune in the Sarthe department in the region of Pays de la Loire in north-western France
- Hédé-Bazouges, a commune in the Ille-et-Vilaine department in Brittany in northwestern France
- Noyal-sous-Bazouges, a commune in the Ille-et-Vilaine department in Brittany in northwestern France

== See also ==
- La Bazoge (disambiguation)
- La Bazouge (disambiguation)
