= Saint-Martin-de-Connée =

- Part of Vimartin-sur-Orthe
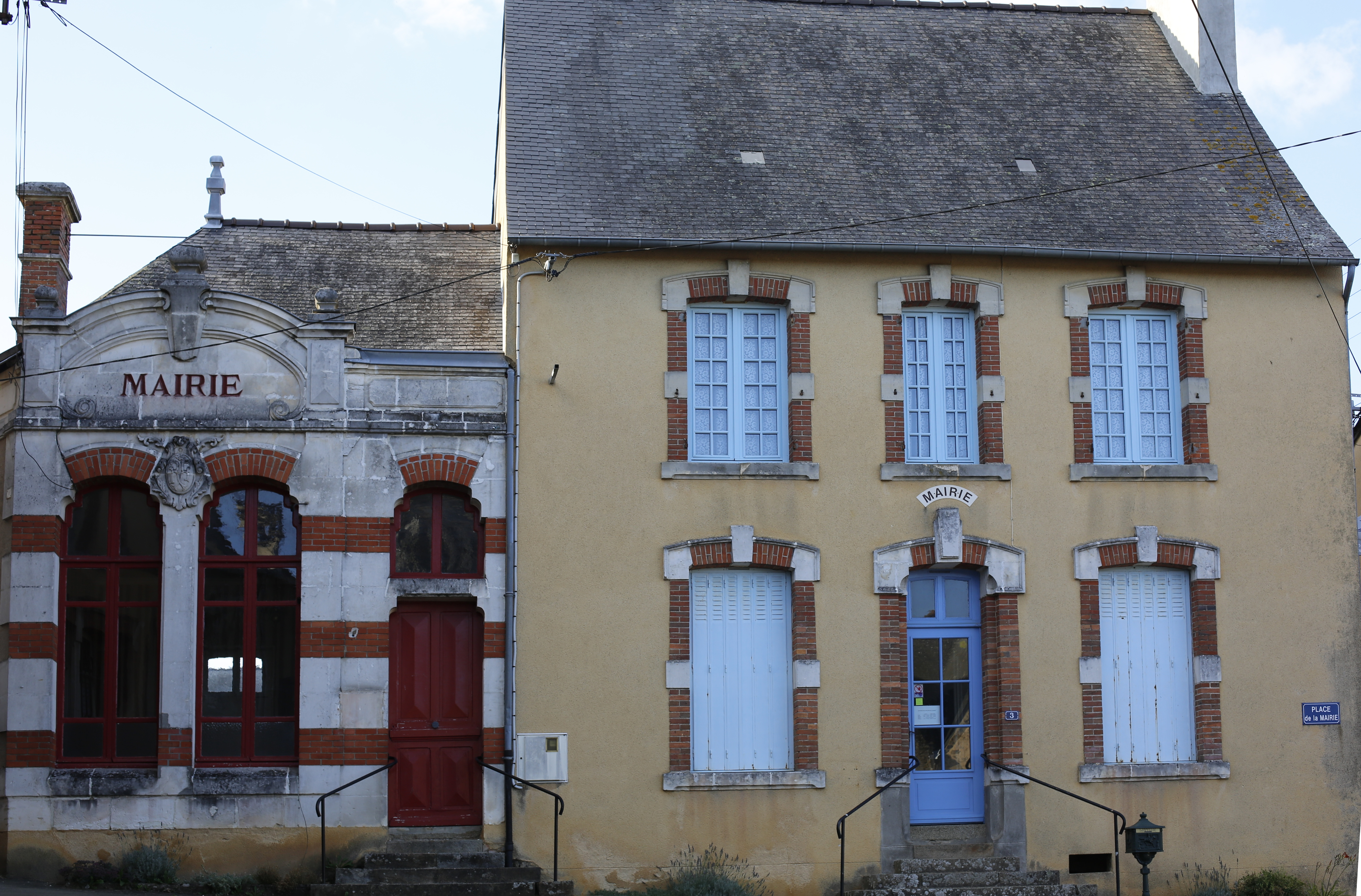
- The town hall in Saint-Martin-de-Connée
- Location of Saint-Martin-de-Connée
- Location within France Location within Pays de la Loire
- Coordinates: 48°12′52″N 0°13′05″W
- Country: France
- Region: Pays de la Loire
- Department: Mayenne
- Arrondissement: Mayenne
- Canton: Évron
- Commune: Vimartin-sur-Orthe
- Area^{1}: 19.49 km^{2} (7.53 sq mi)
- Elevation: 300 m (980 ft)
- Highest elevation: 321 m (1,053 ft)
- Lowest elevation: 159 m (522 ft)
- Population (2022): 403
  - Density: 20.7/km^{2} (53.6/sq mi)
- Time zone: UTC+01:00 (CET)
  - Summer (DST): UTC+02:00 (CEST)
- Postal code: 53160
- ^{1} French Land Register data, which excludes lakes, ponds, glaciers > 1 km^{2} (0.386 sq mi or 247 acres) and river estuaries.

Saint-Martin-de-Connée (French pronunciation: [sɛ̃ maʁtɛ̃ də kɔne]) is a former commune in the Mayenne department in north-western France. On 1 January 2021, it was merged into the new commune Vimartin-sur-Orthe.

== See also ==
- Communes of the Mayenne department
