= Vimarcé =

- Part of Vimartin-sur-Orthe
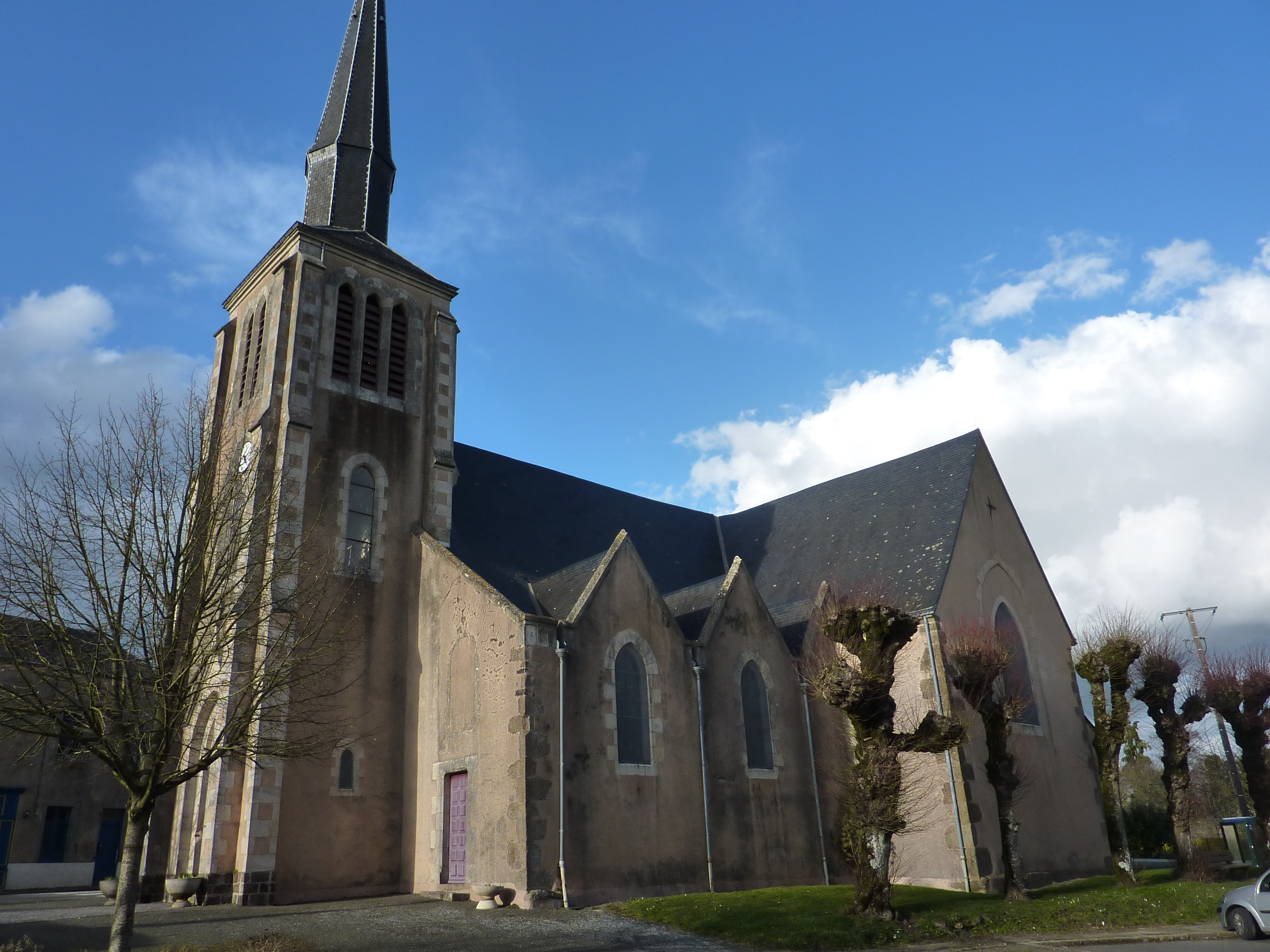
- The church of Saint-Jean-Baptiste, in Vimarcé

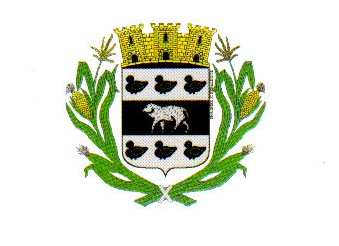
- Coat of arms
- Location of Vimarcé
- Location within France Location within Pays de la Loire
- Coordinates: 48°11′47″N 0°12′47″W
- Country: France
- Region: Pays de la Loire
- Department: Mayenne
- Arrondissement: Mayenne
- Canton: Évron
- Commune: Vimartin-sur-Orthe
- Area^{1}: 20.77 km^{2} (8.02 sq mi)
- Highest elevation: 302 m (991 ft)
- Lowest elevation: 135 m (443 ft)
- Population (2022): 228
  - Density: 11.0/km^{2} (28.4/sq mi)
- Time zone: UTC+01:00 (CET)
  - Summer (DST): UTC+02:00 (CEST)
- Postal code: 53160
- ^{1} French Land Register data, which excludes lakes, ponds, glaciers > 1 km^{2} (0.386 sq mi or 247 acres) and river estuaries.

Vimarcé (French pronunciation: [vimaʁse]) is a former commune in the Mayenne department in north-western France. On 1 January 2021, Vimarcé was merged into the new commune Vimartin-sur-Orthe.

== See also ==
- Communes of the Mayenne department
- Parc naturel régional Normandie-Maine
