= Vimartin-sur-Orthe =

- Commune
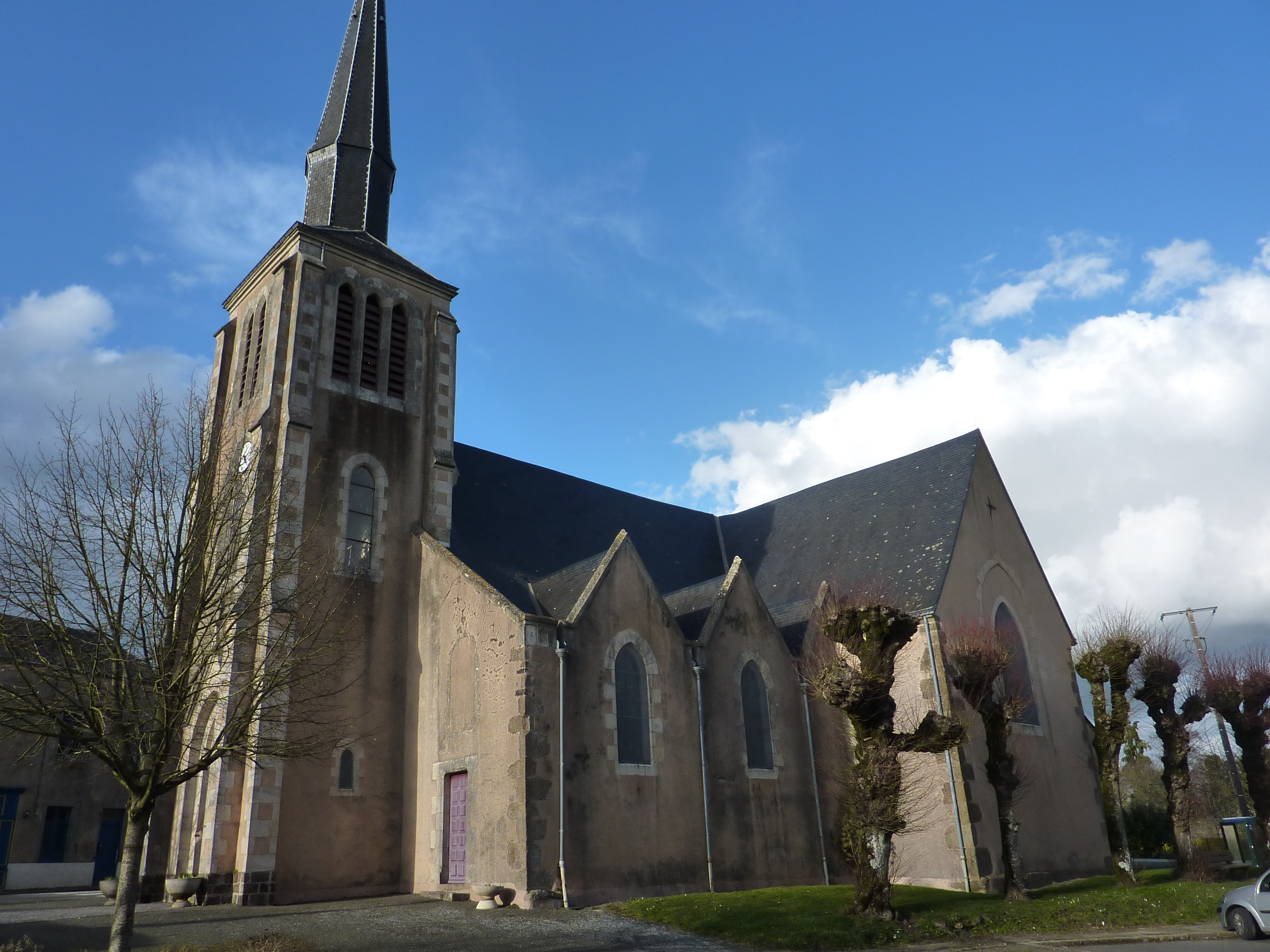
- Location of Vimartin-sur-Orthe
- Location within France Location within Pays de la Loire
- Coordinates: 48°12′39″N 0°12′27″W
- Country: France
- Region: Pays de la Loire
- Department: Mayenne
- Arrondissement: Mayenne
- Canton: Évron
- Intercommunality: Coëvrons

Government
  - Mayor (2021–2026): Xavier Seigneuret
- Area^{1}: 71.92 km^{2} (27.77 sq mi)
- Highest elevation: 321 m (1,053 ft)
- Lowest elevation: 122 m (400 ft)
- Population (2023): 1,100
  - Density: 15/km^{2} (40/sq mi)
- Time zone: UTC+01:00 (CET)
  - Summer (DST): UTC+02:00 (CEST)
- INSEE/Postal code: 53239 /53160
- ^{1} French Land Register data, which excludes lakes, ponds, glaciers > 1 km^{2} (0.386 sq mi or 247 acres) and river estuaries.

Vimartin-sur-Orthe (French pronunciation: [vimaʁtɛ̃ syʁ ɔʁt]) is a new commune in the Mayenne department in north-western France. It was established on 1 January 2021 from the amalgamation of the communes of Vimarcé, Saint-Pierre-sur-Orthe and Saint-Martin-de-Connée

== See also ==
- Communes of the Mayenne department
- List of new French communes created in 2021
