= Voutré =

- Commune
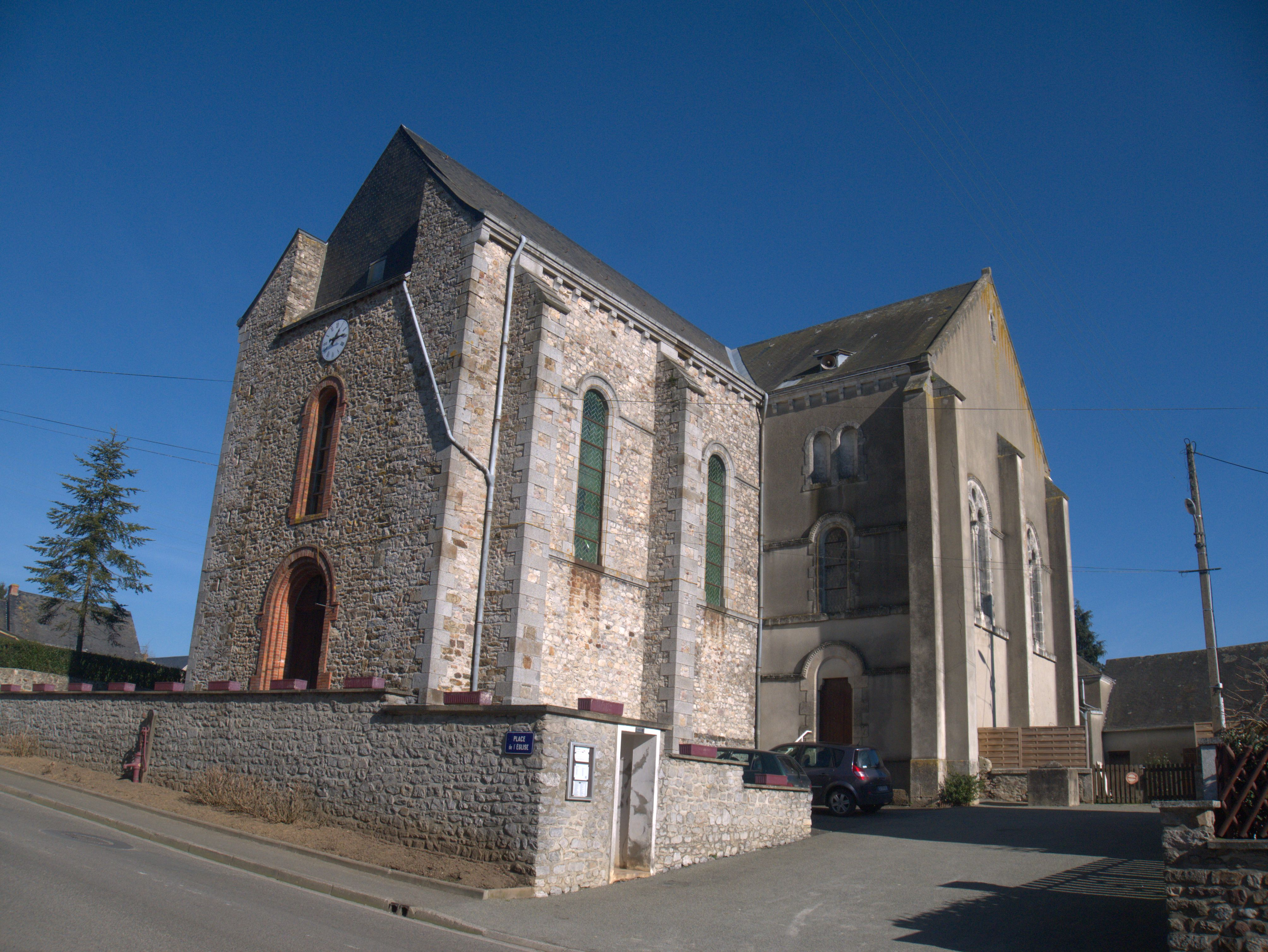
- The church in Voutré
- Location of Voutré
- Location within France Location within Pays de la Loire
- Coordinates: 48°08′14″N 0°17′23″W
- Country: France
- Region: Pays de la Loire
- Department: Mayenne
- Arrondissement: Mayenne
- Canton: Évron
- Intercommunality: Coëvrons

Government
  - Mayor (2020–2026): Dominique Richard
- Area^{1}: 18.57 km^{2} (7.17 sq mi)
- Elevation: 144 m (472 ft)
- Highest elevation: 326 m (1,070 ft)
- Lowest elevation: 117 m (384 ft)
- Population (2023): 893
  - Density: 48.1/km^{2} (125/sq mi)
- Time zone: UTC+01:00 (CET)
  - Summer (DST): UTC+02:00 (CEST)
- INSEE/Postal code: 53276 /53600
- ^{1} French Land Register data, which excludes lakes, ponds, glaciers > 1 km^{2} (0.386 sq mi or 247 acres) and river estuaries.

Voutré (French pronunciation: [vutʁe]) is a commune in the Mayenne department in north-western France.

== See also ==
- Communes of the Mayenne department
