= La Bazoge =

La Bazoge may refer to several communes in France:

- La Bazoge, Manche, in the Manche département
- La Bazoge, Sarthe, in the Sarthe département
- La Bazoge-Montpinçon, in the Mayenne département

== See also ==
- Bazoges-en-Pareds, in the Vendée département
- La Bazouge-de-Chemeré, in the Mayenne département
- La Bazouge-des-Alleux, in the Mayenne département
- La Bazouge-du-Désert, in the Ille-et-Vilaine département
