= Mézangers =

- Commune
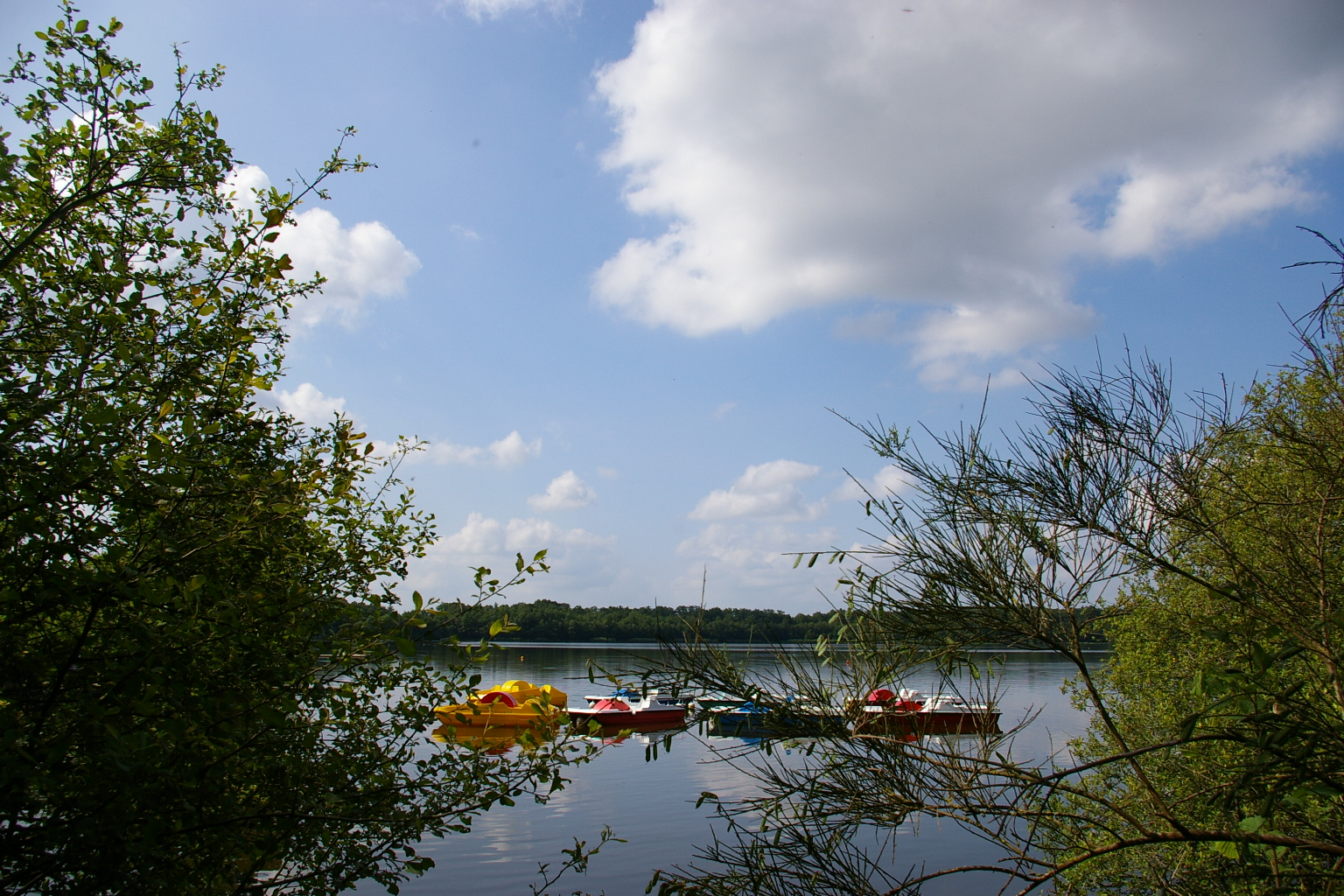
- The Gué-de-Selle Lake, in Mézangers
- Location of Mézangers
- Location within France Location within Pays de la Loire
- Coordinates: 48°11′30″N 0°25′54″W
- Country: France
- Region: Pays de la Loire
- Department: Mayenne
- Arrondissement: Mayenne
- Canton: Évron

Government
  - Mayor (2020–2026): Robert Geslot
- Area^{1}: 29.34 km^{2} (11.33 sq mi)
- Elevation: 108 m (354 ft)
- Highest elevation: 138 m (453 ft)
- Lowest elevation: 84 m (276 ft)
- Population (2023): 627
  - Density: 21.4/km^{2} (55.3/sq mi)
- Time zone: UTC+01:00 (CET)
  - Summer (DST): UTC+02:00 (CEST)
- INSEE/Postal code: 53153 /53600
- ^{1} French Land Register data, which excludes lakes, ponds, glaciers > 1 km^{2} (0.386 sq mi or 247 acres) and river estuaries.

Mézangers (French pronunciation: [mezɑ̃ʒe]) is a commune in the Mayenne department in north-western France.

== See also ==
- Communes of Mayenne
