= Izé =

- Commune
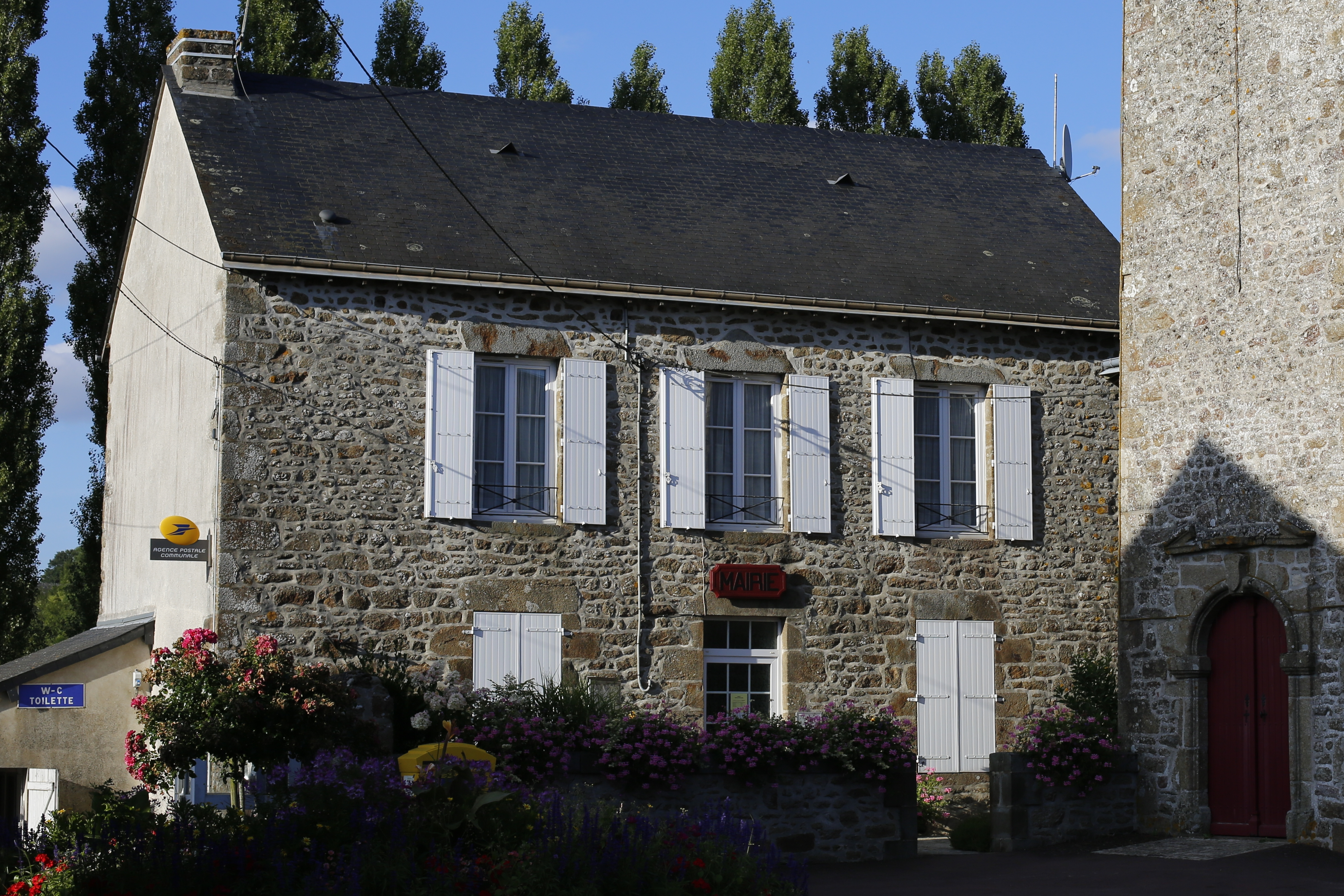
- The town hall in Izé
- Location of Izé
- Location within France Location within Pays de la Loire
- Coordinates: 48°13′48″N 0°18′21″W
- Country: France
- Region: Pays de la Loire
- Department: Mayenne
- Arrondissement: Mayenne
- Canton: Évron

Government
  - Mayor (2020–2026): Anne-Flore Bourillon
- Area^{1}: 28.15 km^{2} (10.87 sq mi)
- Elevation: 304 m (997 ft)
- Highest elevation: 354 m (1,161 ft)
- Lowest elevation: 217 m (712 ft)
- Population (2023): 464
  - Density: 16.5/km^{2} (42.7/sq mi)
- Time zone: UTC+01:00 (CET)
  - Summer (DST): UTC+02:00 (CEST)
- INSEE/Postal code: 53120 /53160
- ^{1} French Land Register data, which excludes lakes, ponds, glaciers > 1 km^{2} (0.386 sq mi or 247 acres) and river estuaries.

Izé (French pronunciation: [ize]) is a commune in the arrondissement of Mayenne, Mayenne department, Pays de la Loire, France.

The Izé hall and mairie border a large fishing pond stocked with salmon and trout. The village has its own bakery and bar-cafe, which also sells basic food supplies.

The Church of Saint Peter and Saint Paul was heavily rebuilt following the tornado of 1978. Renovation works include new stained glass windows incorporating the faces of contemporary political figures, notably François Mitterrand.

In 2018 the French national statistics bureau, Insee, reported that the population of Izé was 457, down from 2,025 in 1836.

The novelist and critic Frédéric Lefèvre (1889–1949) was born in Ize on the 7 May 1889. A plaque marks his house today.

== See also ==
- Communes of the Mayenne department
