= Assé-le-Bérenger =

- Commune
- Location of Assé-le-Bérenger
- Location within France Location within Pays de la Loire
- Coordinates: 48°09′23″N 0°19′10″W
- Country: France
- Region: Pays de la Loire
- Department: Mayenne
- Arrondissement: Mayenne
- Canton: Évron
- Intercommunality: CC Coëvrons

Government
  - Mayor (2020–2026): François Leroux
- Area^{1}: 11.68 km^{2} (4.51 sq mi)
- Highest elevation: 290 m (950 ft)
- Lowest elevation: 122 m (400 ft)
- Population (2023): 395
  - Density: 33.8/km^{2} (87.6/sq mi)
- Time zone: UTC+01:00 (CET)
  - Summer (DST): UTC+02:00 (CEST)
- INSEE/Postal code: 53010 /53600
- ^{1} French Land Register data, which excludes lakes, ponds, glaciers > 1 km^{2} (0.386 sq mi or 247 acres) and river estuaries.

Assé-le-Bérenger (French pronunciation: [ase lə beʁɑ̃ʒe]) is a commune in the Mayenne department in northwestern France.

== Population ==
Historical population
Year	Pop.	±% p.a.
1968	348	—
1975	295	−2.33%
1982	271	−1.20%
1990	298	+1.19%
1999	329	+1.11%
2007	393	+2.25%
2012	425	+1.58%
2017	450	+1.15%
2023	395	−2.15%
Source: INSEE

== See also ==
- Communes of Mayenne
