= Trans, Mayenne =

Trans
- Commune
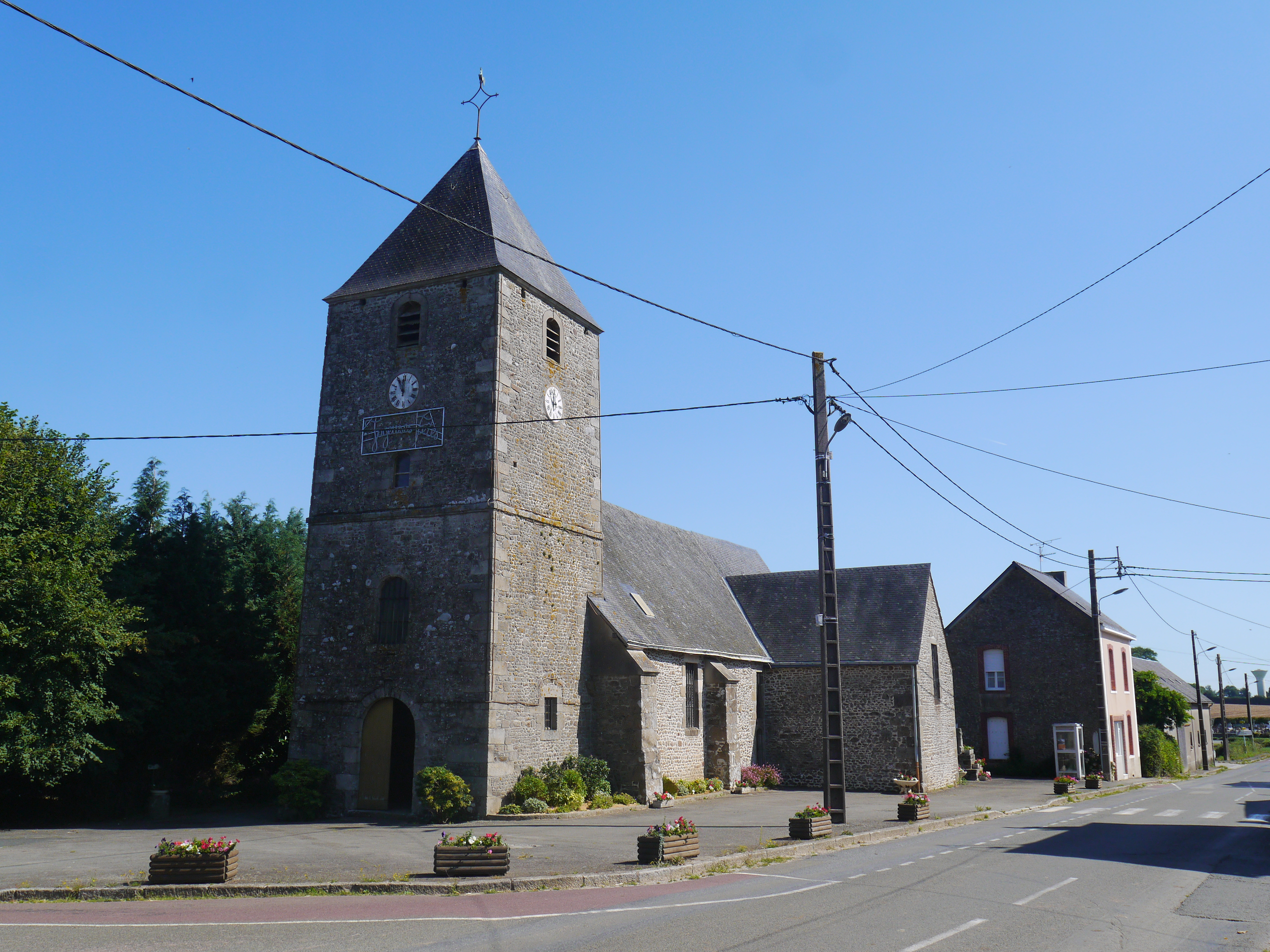
- Location of Trans
- Location within France Location within Pays de la Loire
- Coordinates: 48°16′29″N 0°18′25″W
- Country: France
- Region: Pays de la Loire
- Department: Mayenne
- Arrondissement: Mayenne
- Canton: Évron

Government
  - Mayor (2020–2026): Hervé Rondeau
- Area^{1}: 15.43 km^{2} (5.96 sq mi)
- Elevation: 274 m (899 ft)
- Highest elevation: 299 m (981 ft)
- Lowest elevation: 198 m (650 ft)
- Population (2023): 231
  - Density: 15.0/km^{2} (38.8/sq mi)
- Time zone: UTC+01:00 (CET)
  - Summer (DST): UTC+02:00 (CEST)
- INSEE/Postal code: 53266 /53160
- ^{1} French Land Register data, which excludes lakes, ponds, glaciers > 1 km^{2} (0.386 sq mi or 247 acres) and river estuaries.

Trans is a commune in the Mayenne department in north-western France.

== See also ==
- Communes of the Mayenne department
