= Mosnac-Saint-Simeux =

- Commune
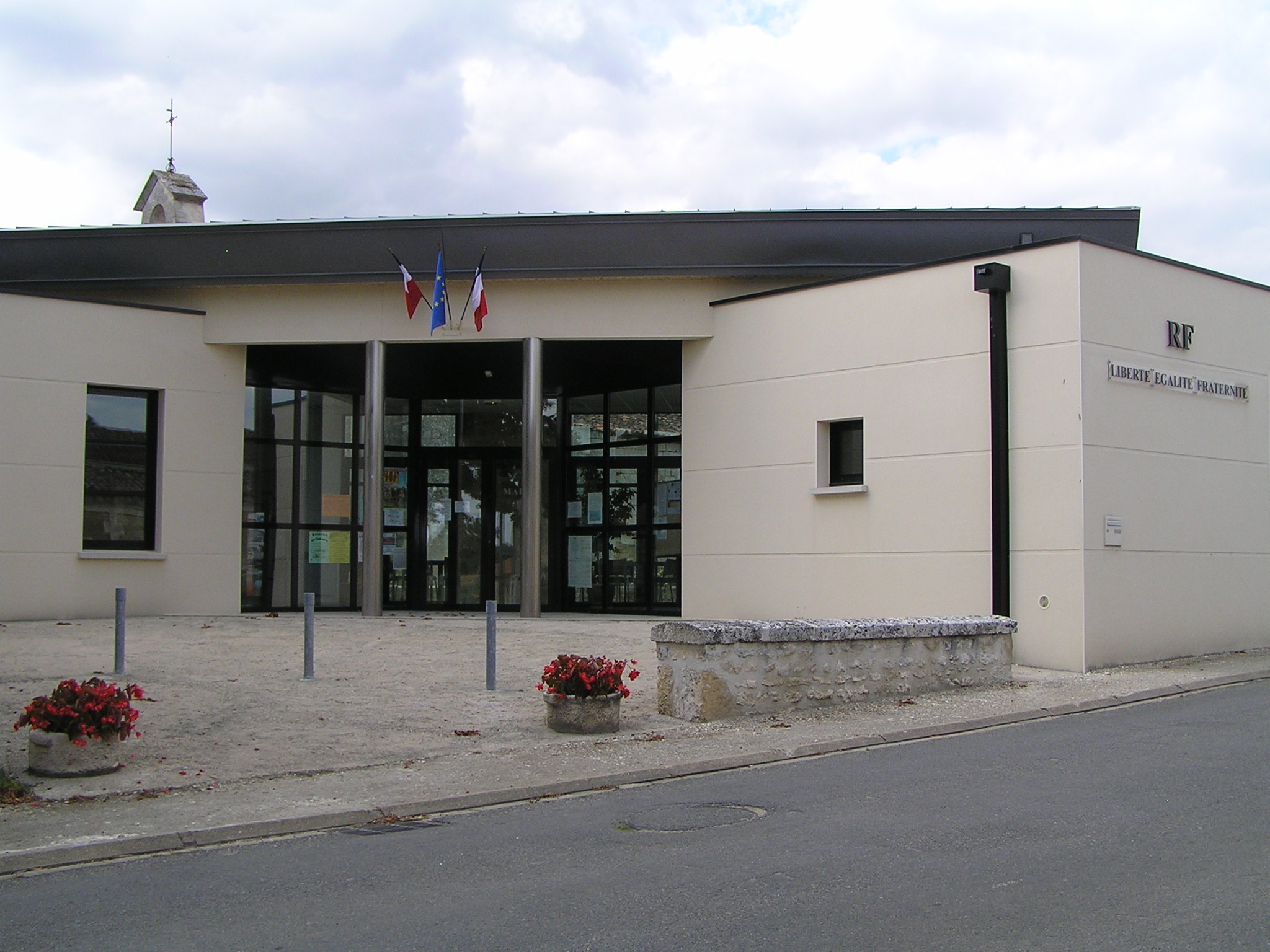
- Town hall
- Location of Mosnac-Saint-Simeux
- Location within France Location within Nouvelle-Aquitaine
- Coordinates: 45°37′11″N 0°1′4″W
- Country: France
- Region: Nouvelle-Aquitaine
- Department: Charente
- Arrondissement: Cognac
- Canton: Charente-Champagne
- Intercommunality: CA Grand Cognac

Government
  - Mayor (2021–2026): Monique Percept
- Area^{1}: 15.73 km^{2} (6.07 sq mi)
- Highest elevation: 99 m (325 ft)
- Lowest elevation: 16 m (52 ft)
- Population (2023): 950
  - Density: 60/km^{2} (160/sq mi)
- Time zone: UTC+01:00 (CET)
  - Summer (DST): UTC+02:00 (CEST)
- INSEE/Postal code: 16233 /16120
- ^{1} French Land Register data, which excludes lakes, ponds, glaciers > 1 km^{2} (0.386 sq mi or 247 acres) and river estuaries.

Mosnac-Saint-Simeux (French pronunciation: [monak sɛ̃ simø]) is a commune in the Charente department in southwestern France. It was established on 1 January 2021 from the amalgamation of the communes of Mosnac and Saint-Simeux.

== Politics and administration ==
The municipal council at its creation was composed of all municipal councillors from both regrouped communes.

List of successive mayors of Mosnac-Saint-Simeux
In office		Name	Party	Capacity	Ref.
1 January 2021	Incumbent	Monique Percept		Former mayor of Saint-Simeux	

=== Delegated communes ===
List of delegated communes of Mosnac-Saint-Simeux
Name	Code INSEE	Intercommunality	Area (km^{2})	Population (2018)	Density (per km^{2})
Mosnac (Seat)	16233	CA du Grand Cognac	6.33	449	71
Saint-Simeux	16351	CA du Grand Cognac	9.4	577	61

== See also ==
- Communes of the Charente department
- List of new French communes created in 2021
