= Saint-Georges-sur-Erve =

- Commune
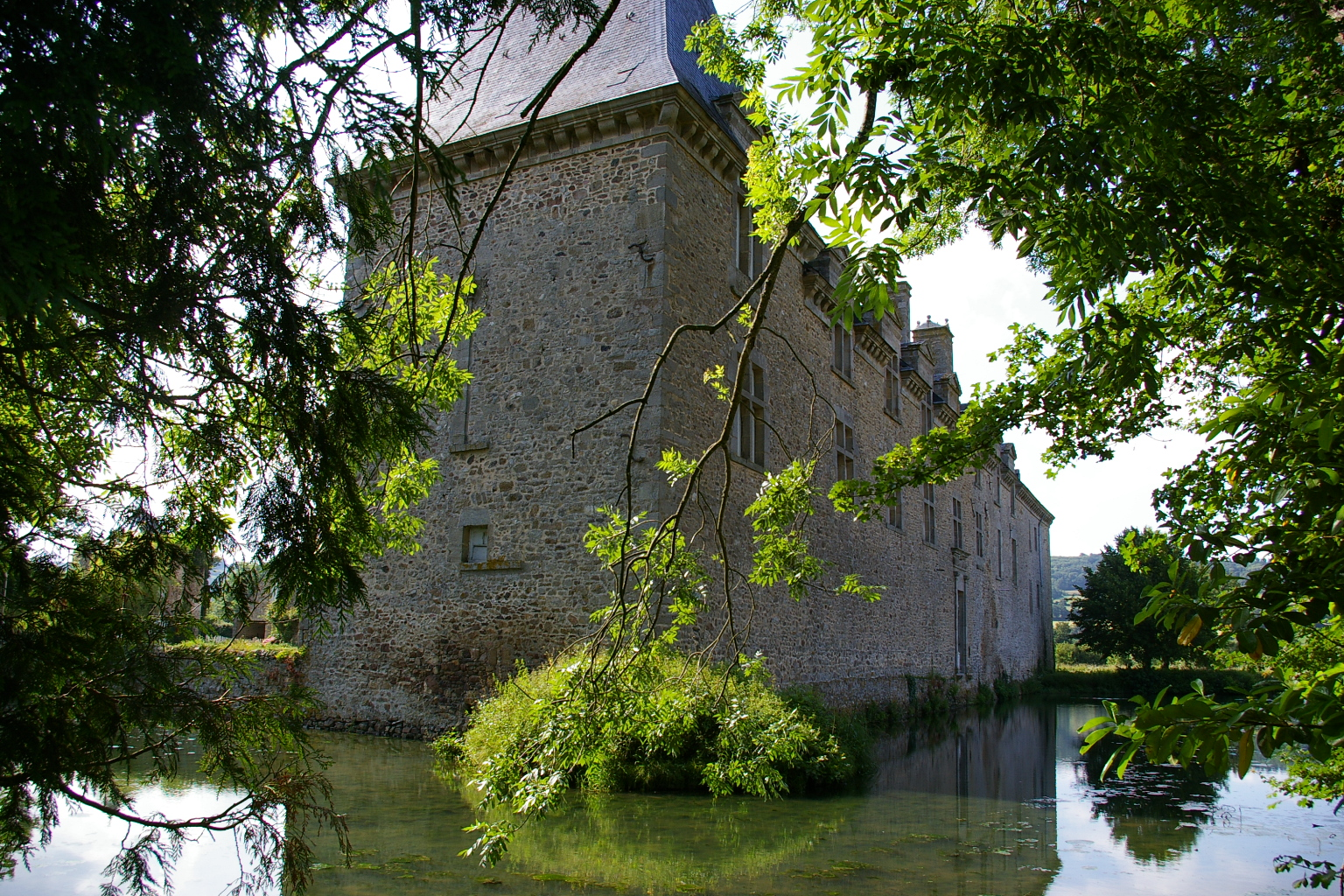
- The Château de Foulletorte
- Location of Saint-Georges-sur-Erve
- Location within France Location within Pays de la Loire
- Coordinates: 48°10′09″N 0°17′48″W
- Country: France
- Region: Pays de la Loire
- Department: Mayenne
- Arrondissement: Mayenne
- Canton: Évron
- Intercommunality: CC des Coëvrons

Government
  - Mayor (2020–2026): Philippe Duytsche
- Area^{1}: 20.17 km^{2} (7.79 sq mi)
- Elevation: 180 m (590 ft)
- Highest elevation: 326 m (1,070 ft)
- Lowest elevation: 129 m (423 ft)
- Population (2023): 393
  - Density: 19.5/km^{2} (50.5/sq mi)
- Time zone: UTC+01:00 (CET)
  - Summer (DST): UTC+02:00 (CEST)
- INSEE/Postal code: 53221 /53600
- ^{1} French Land Register data, which excludes lakes, ponds, glaciers > 1 km^{2} (0.386 sq mi or 247 acres) and river estuaries.

Saint-Georges-sur-Erve (French pronunciation: [sɛ̃ ʒɔʁʒ syʁ ɛʁv]) is a commune in the Mayenne department, Pays de la Loire region in north-western France. The local people are known as Ervigeorgeais in French.

It consists of a small sized village, home to a school, library and town hall, as well as a restaurant which serves as a tabac and newsagent to the village.

There is also a small mountain bike group, the Saint-Georges Adventure Group, which does yearly biking competitions starting at Saint-Georges to other areas.

== Gallery ==
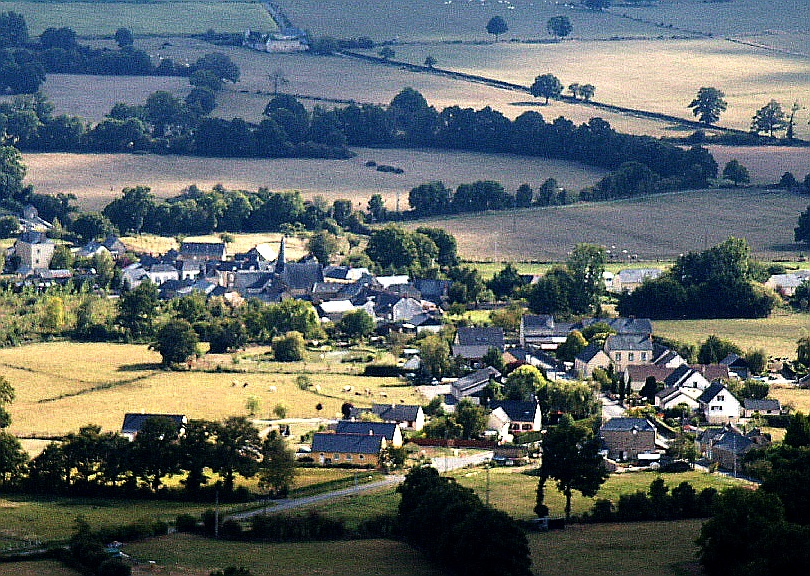
St Georges sur Erve

== See also ==
- Communes of the Mayenne department
