= Champgenéteux =

- Commune
- Coat of arms
- Location of Champgenéteux
- Location within France Location within Pays de la Loire
- Coordinates: 48°17′28″N 0°21′44″W
- Country: France
- Region: Pays de la Loire
- Department: Mayenne
- Arrondissement: Mayenne
- Canton: Évron

Government
  - Mayor (2020–2026): Gaël Gringoire
- Area^{1}: 25.11 km^{2} (9.70 sq mi)
- Highest elevation: 277 m (909 ft)
- Lowest elevation: 142 m (466 ft)
- Population (2023): 492
  - Density: 19.6/km^{2} (50.7/sq mi)
- Time zone: UTC+01:00 (CET)
  - Summer (DST): UTC+02:00 (CEST)
- INSEE/Postal code: 53053 /53160
- ^{1} French Land Register data, which excludes lakes, ponds, glaciers > 1 km^{2} (0.386 sq mi or 247 acres) and river estuaries.

Champgenéteux (French pronunciation: [ʃɑ̃ʒənetø]) is a commune in the Mayenne department in north-western France.

== See also ==
- Communes of the Mayenne department
