= Hambers =

- Commune
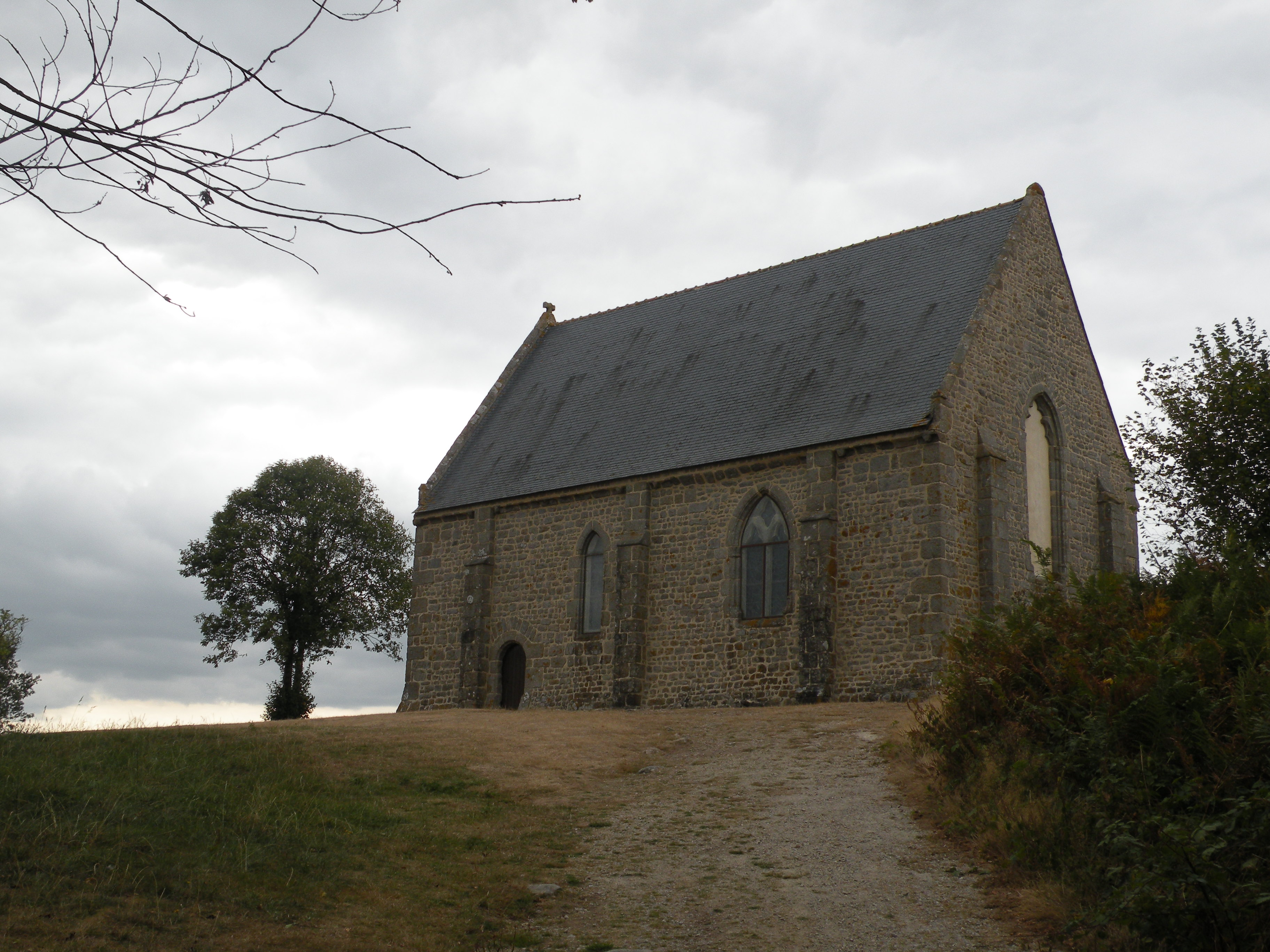
- The Chapel of Saint-Michel of Montaigu
- Location of Hambers
- Location within France Location within Pays de la Loire
- Coordinates: 48°15′18″N 0°25′02″W
- Country: France
- Region: Pays de la Loire
- Department: Mayenne
- Arrondissement: Mayenne
- Canton: Évron
- Intercommunality: CC Coëvrons

Government
  - Mayor (2020–2026): Bertrand Chesnay
- Area^{1}: 25.93 km^{2} (10.01 sq mi)
- Elevation: 260 m (850 ft)
- Highest elevation: 291 m (955 ft)
- Lowest elevation: 112 m (367 ft)
- Population (2023): 624
  - Density: 24.1/km^{2} (62.3/sq mi)
- Time zone: UTC+01:00 (CET)
  - Summer (DST): UTC+02:00 (CEST)
- INSEE/Postal code: 53113 /53160
- ^{1} French Land Register data, which excludes lakes, ponds, glaciers > 1 km^{2} (0.386 sq mi or 247 acres) and river estuaries.

Hambers (French pronunciation: [ɑ̃be]) is a commune in the Mayenne department in north-western France.

== See also ==
- Communes of the Mayenne department
