= Livet =

- Commune
- Location of Livet
- Location within France Location within Pays de la Loire
- Coordinates: 48°06′31″N 0°27′37″W
- Country: France
- Region: Pays de la Loire
- Department: Mayenne
- Arrondissement: Mayenne
- Canton: Évron

Government
  - Mayor (2020–2026): Fabrice Sirot
- Area^{1}: 11.16 km^{2} (4.31 sq mi)
- Highest elevation: 137 m (449 ft)
- Lowest elevation: 88 m (289 ft)
- Population (2023): 191
  - Density: 17.1/km^{2} (44.3/sq mi)
- Time zone: UTC+01:00 (CET)
  - Summer (DST): UTC+02:00 (CEST)
- INSEE/Postal code: 53134 /53150
- ^{1} French Land Register data, which excludes lakes, ponds, glaciers > 1 km^{2} (0.386 sq mi or 247 acres) and river estuaries.

Livet (French pronunciation: [livɛ]) is a commune in the Mayenne department in north-western France.

Livet is also:

- Eugène Livet, founder of the institution Livet, now lycée Eugène-Livet (in Nantes, France).
- Several former towns in France were named Livet.

== See also ==
- Communes of the Mayenne department
- mairie de livet en charnie
