= Saint-Thomas-de-Courceriers =

- Commune
- Location of Saint-Thomas-de-Courceriers
- Location within France Location within Pays de la Loire
- Coordinates: 48°16′31″N 0°15′50″W
- Country: France
- Region: Pays de la Loire
- Department: Mayenne
- Arrondissement: Mayenne
- Canton: Évron

Government
  - Mayor (2020–2026): Jacques Daneau
- Area^{1}: 12.95 km^{2} (5.00 sq mi)
- Elevation: 245 m (804 ft)
- Highest elevation: 330 m (1,080 ft)
- Lowest elevation: 142 m (466 ft)
- Population (2023): 166
  - Density: 12.8/km^{2} (33.2/sq mi)
- Time zone: UTC+01:00 (CET)
  - Summer (DST): UTC+02:00 (CEST)
- INSEE/Postal code: 53256 /53160
- ^{1} French Land Register data, which excludes lakes, ponds, glaciers > 1 km^{2} (0.386 sq mi or 247 acres) and river estuaries.

Saint-Thomas-de-Courceriers (French pronunciation: [sɛ̃ tɔmɑ d(ə) kuʁsəʁje]) is a commune in the Mayenne department in north-western France.

== See also ==
- Communes of the Mayenne department
