= Brée =

- Commune
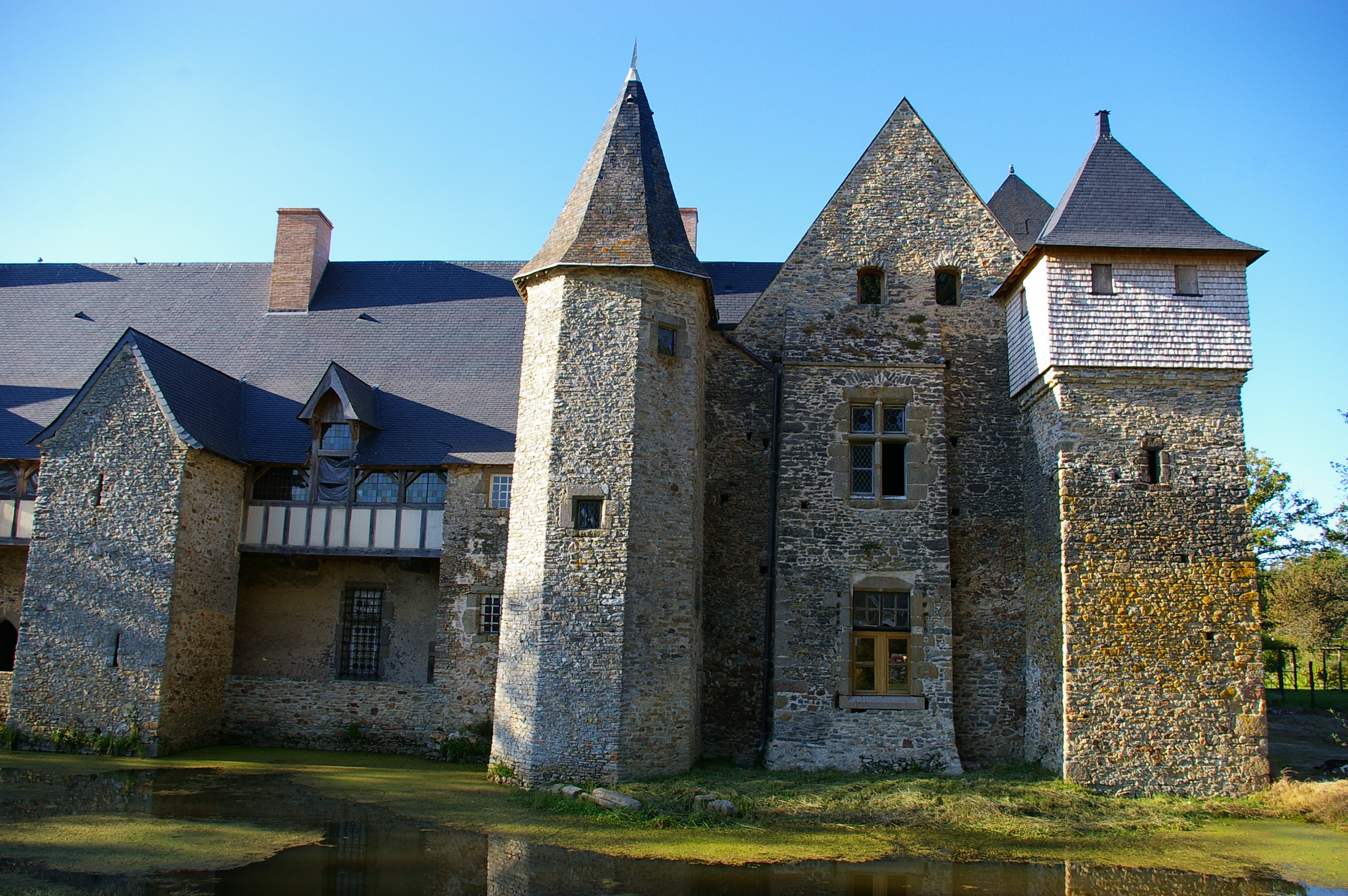
- The Château de la Grande Courbe, in Brée
- Location of Brée
- Location within France Location within Pays de la Loire
- Coordinates: 48°09′04″N 0°31′05″W
- Country: France
- Region: Pays de la Loire
- Department: Mayenne
- Arrondissement: Mayenne
- Canton: Évron

Government
  - Mayor (2020–2026): Claude Garnier
- Area^{1}: 16.41 km^{2} (6.34 sq mi)
- Elevation: 80 m (260 ft)
- Highest elevation: 125 m (410 ft)
- Lowest elevation: 72 m (236 ft)
- Population (2023): 591
  - Density: 36.0/km^{2} (93.3/sq mi)
- Time zone: UTC+01:00 (CET)
  - Summer (DST): UTC+02:00 (CEST)
- INSEE/Postal code: 53043 /53150
- ^{1} French Land Register data, which excludes lakes, ponds, glaciers > 1 km^{2} (0.386 sq mi or 247 acres) and river estuaries.

Brée (French pronunciation: [bʁe]) is a commune in the Mayenne department in northwestern France.

== Population ==
Historical population
Year	Pop.	±% p.a.
1968	504	—
1975	515	+0.31%
1982	540	+0.68%
1990	482	−1.41%
1999	459	−0.54%
2007	459	+0.00%
2012	554	+3.83%
2017	535	−0.70%
2023	591	+1.67%
Source: INSEE

== See also ==
- Communes of Mayenne
