= Saint-Pierre-sur-Orthe =

- Part of Vimartin-sur-Orthe
- Location of Saint-Pierre-sur-Orthe
- Location within France Location within Pays de la Loire
- Coordinates: 48°12′42″N 0°12′23″W
- Country: France
- Region: Pays de la Loire
- Department: Mayenne
- Arrondissement: Mayenne
- Canton: Évron
- Commune: Vimartin-sur-Orthe
- Area^{1}: 31.66 km^{2} (12.22 sq mi)
- Elevation: 140 m (460 ft)
- Highest elevation: 301 m (988 ft)
- Lowest elevation: 122 m (400 ft)
- Population (2022): 476
  - Density: 15.0/km^{2} (38.9/sq mi)
- Time zone: UTC+01:00 (CET)
  - Summer (DST): UTC+02:00 (CEST)
- Postal code: 53160
- ^{1} French Land Register data, which excludes lakes, ponds, glaciers > 1 km^{2} (0.386 sq mi or 247 acres) and river estuaries.

Saint-Pierre-sur-Orthe is a former commune in the Mayenne department in north-western France. On 1 January 2021, it was merged into the new commune Vimartin-sur-Orthe.

== See also ==
- Communes of the Mayenne department
- Parc naturel régional Normandie-Maine
