= Neau, Mayenne =

Neau
- Commune
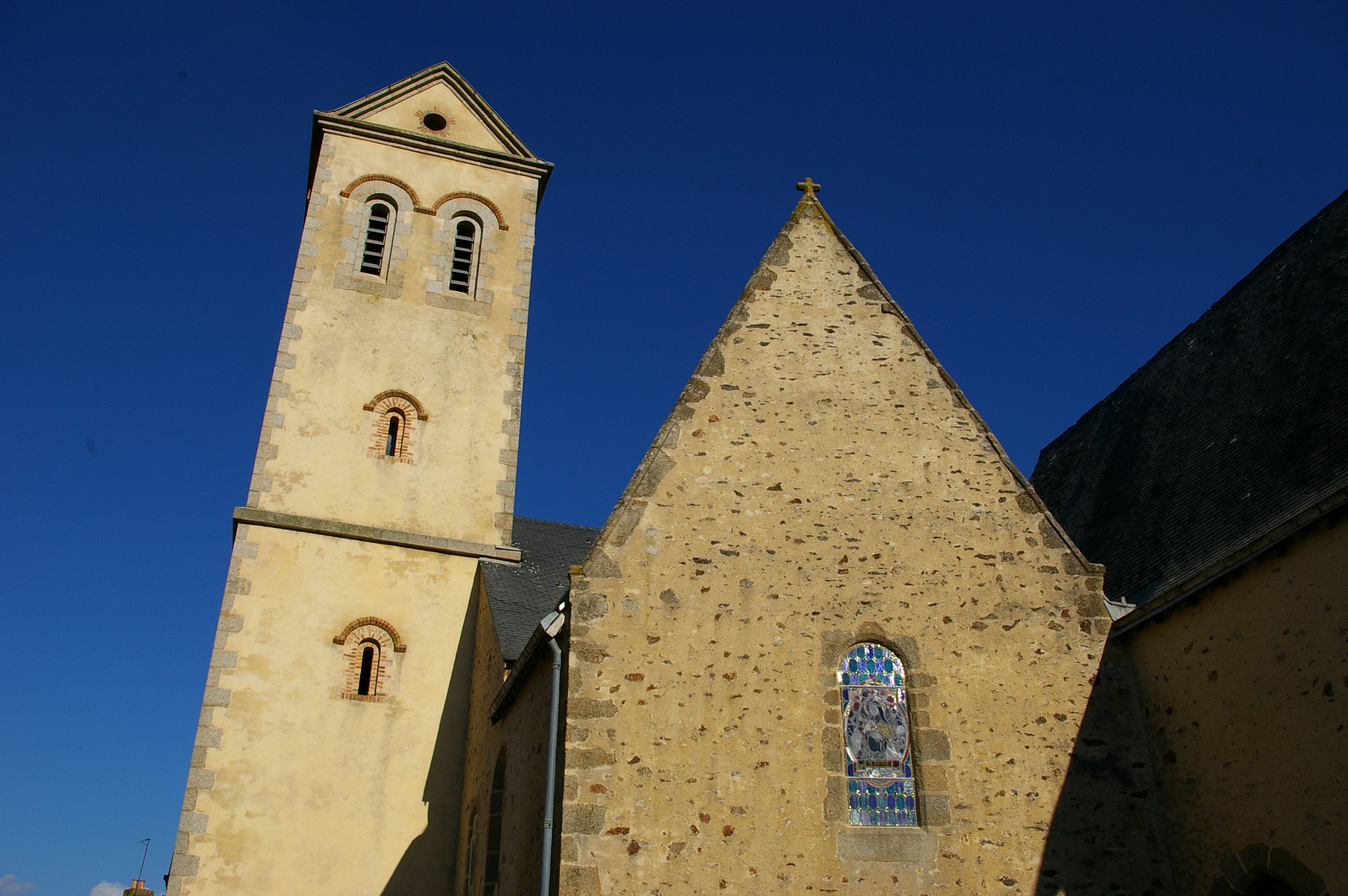
- The church of Saint Vigor, in Neau
- Location of Neau
- Location within France Location within Pays de la Loire
- Coordinates: 48°09′24″N 0°28′28″W
- Country: France
- Region: Pays de la Loire
- Department: Mayenne
- Arrondissement: Mayenne
- Canton: Évron

Government
  - Mayor (2020–2026): José Dard
- Area^{1}: 12.65 km^{2} (4.88 sq mi)
- Elevation: 91 m (299 ft)
- Highest elevation: 114 m (374 ft)
- Lowest elevation: 65 m (213 ft)
- Population (2023): 750
  - Density: 59/km^{2} (150/sq mi)
- Time zone: UTC+01:00 (CET)
  - Summer (DST): UTC+02:00 (CEST)
- INSEE/Postal code: 53163 /53150
- ^{1} French Land Register data, which excludes lakes, ponds, glaciers > 1 km^{2} (0.386 sq mi or 247 acres) and river estuaries.

Neau (French pronunciation: [no]) is a commune in the Mayenne department in north-western France.

== See also ==
- Communes of Mayenne
