= Saint-Simeux =

Commune in Charente, France

- Part of Mosnac-Saint-Simeux
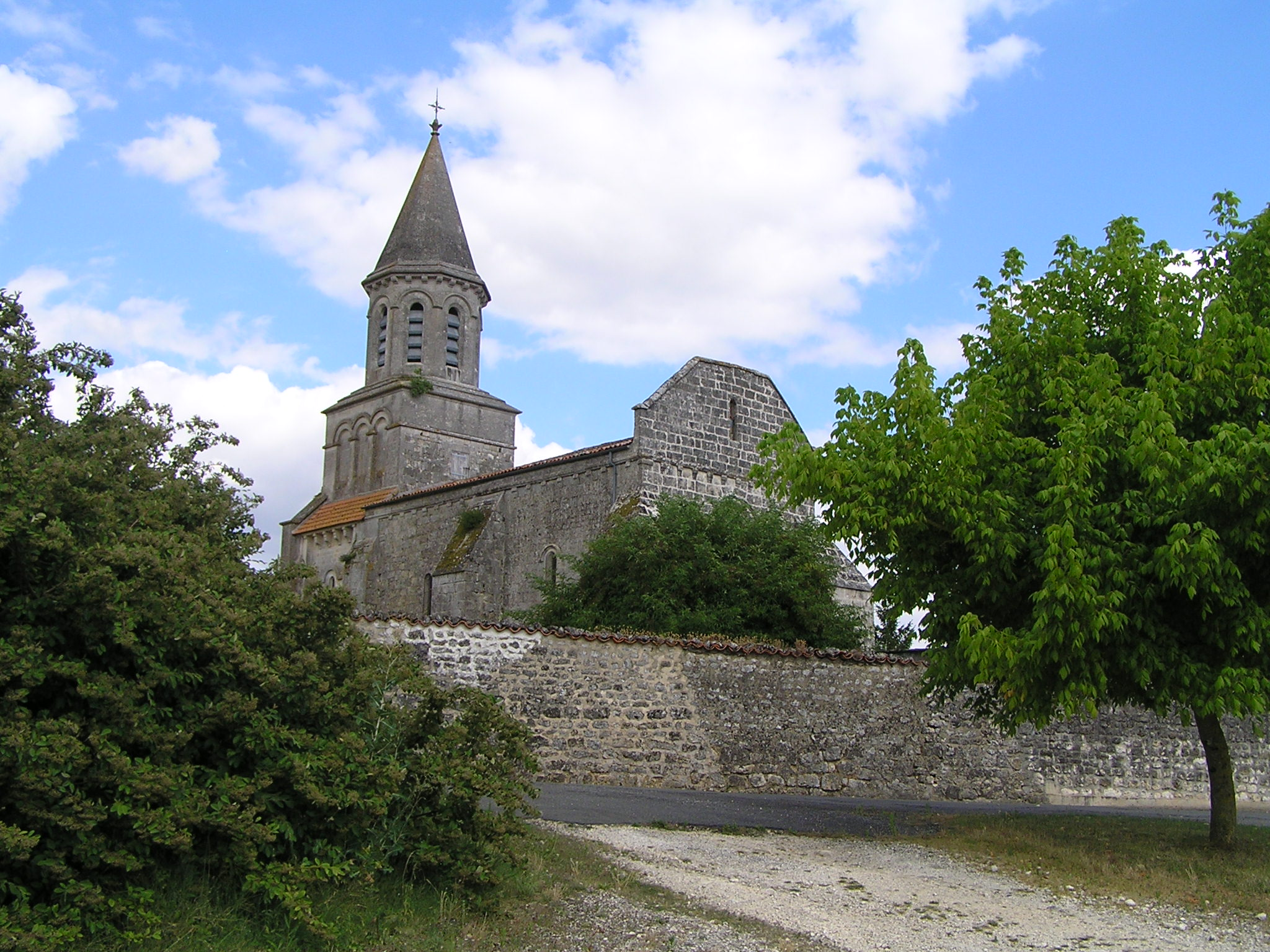
- The church in Saint-Simeux
- Location of Saint-Simeux
- Location within France Location within Nouvelle-Aquitaine
- Coordinates: 45°37′43″N 0°01′30″W
- Country: France
- Region: Nouvelle-Aquitaine
- Department: Charente
- Arrondissement: Cognac
- Canton: Charente-Champagne
- Commune: Mosnac-Saint-Simeux
- Area^{1}: 9.40 km^{2} (3.63 sq mi)
- Elevation: 50 m (160 ft)
- Highest elevation: 99 m (325 ft)
- Lowest elevation: 16 m (52 ft)
- Population (2023): 536
  - Density: 57.0/km^{2} (148/sq mi)
- Time zone: UTC+01:00 (CET)
  - Summer (DST): UTC+02:00 (CEST)
- Postal code: 16120
- ^{1} French Land Register data, which excludes lakes, ponds, glaciers > 1 km^{2} (0.386 sq mi or 247 acres) and river estuaries.

Saint-Simeux (French pronunciation: [sɛ̃ simø]) is a former commune in the Charente department in southwestern France. On 1 January 2021, it was merged into the new commune Mosnac-Saint-Simeux.

== See also ==
- Communes of the Charente department
