= Mosnac, Charente =

Mosnac
- Part of Mosnac-Saint-Simeux
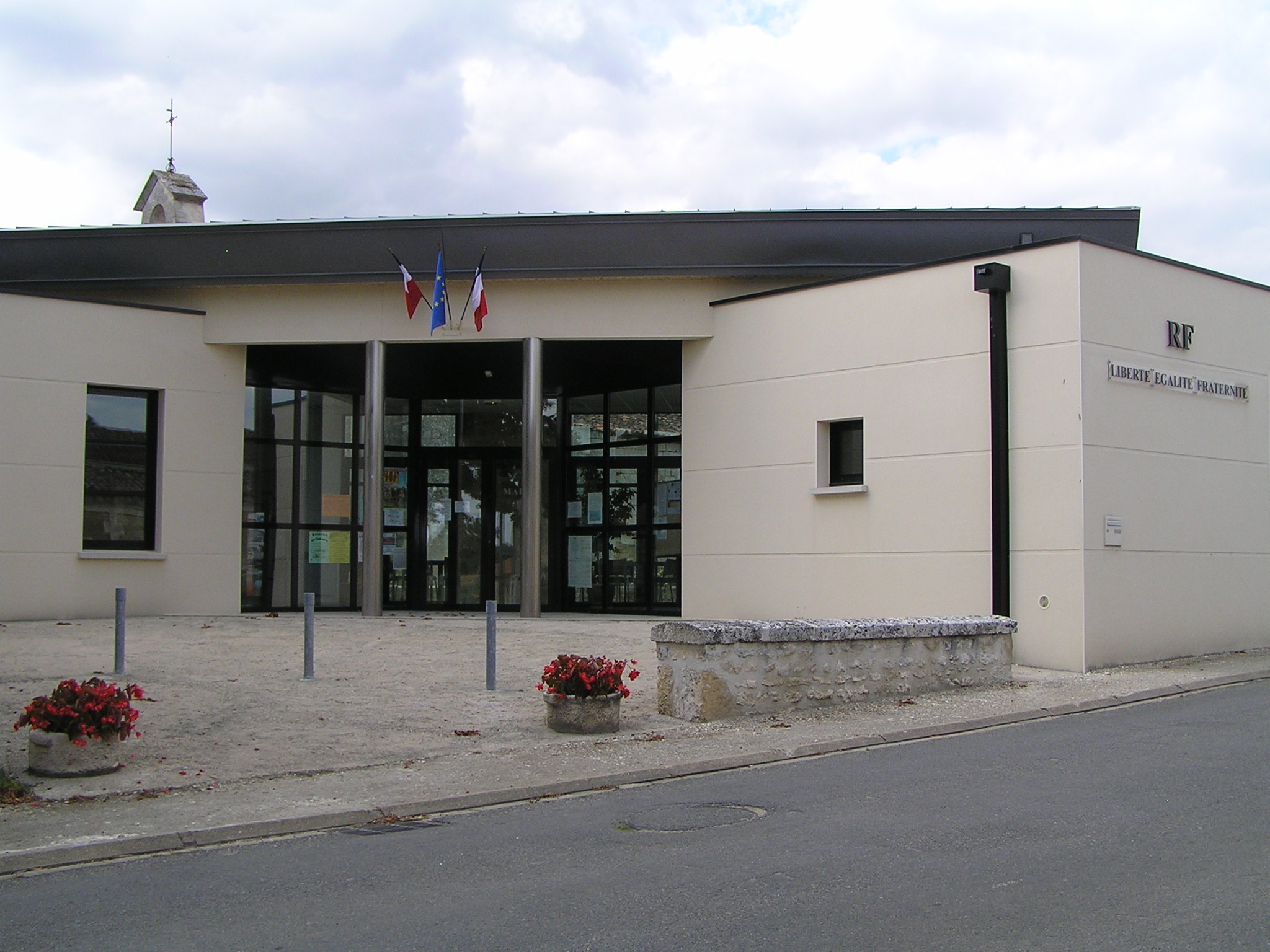
- Town hall
- Location of Mosnac
- Location within France Location within Nouvelle-Aquitaine
- Coordinates: 45°37′11″N 0°01′04″W
- Country: France
- Region: Nouvelle-Aquitaine
- Department: Charente
- Arrondissement: Cognac
- Canton: Charente-Champagne
- Commune: Mosnac-Saint-Simeux
- Area^{1}: 6.33 km^{2} (2.44 sq mi)
- Elevation: 27 m (89 ft)
- Highest elevation: 67 m (220 ft)
- Lowest elevation: 17 m (56 ft)
- Population (2023): 414
  - Density: 65.4/km^{2} (169/sq mi)
- Time zone: UTC+01:00 (CET)
  - Summer (DST): UTC+02:00 (CEST)
- Postal code: 16120
- ^{1} French Land Register data, which excludes lakes, ponds, glaciers > 1 km^{2} (0.386 sq mi or 247 acres) and river estuaries.

Mosnac (French pronunciation: [monak]) is a former commune in the Charente department in southwestern France. On 1 January 2021, it was merged into the new commune Mosnac-Saint-Simeux.

== See also ==
- Communes of the Charente department
