= La Bazouge-de-Chemeré =

- Commune
- Location of La Bazouge-de-Chemeré
- Location within France Location within Pays de la Loire
- Coordinates: 48°00′06″N 0°29′10″W
- Country: France
- Region: Pays de la Loire
- Department: Mayenne
- Arrondissement: Château-Gontier
- Canton: Meslay-du-Maine

Government
  - Mayor (2022–2026): Marie-France Mandelli
- Area^{1}: 24.84 km^{2} (9.59 sq mi)
- Elevation: 98 m (322 ft)
- Highest elevation: 112 m (367 ft)
- Lowest elevation: 58 m (190 ft)
- Population (2023): 497
  - Density: 20.0/km^{2} (51.8/sq mi)
- Time zone: UTC+01:00 (CET)
  - Summer (DST): UTC+02:00 (CEST)
- INSEE/Postal code: 53022 /53170
- ^{1} French Land Register data, which excludes lakes, ponds, glaciers > 1 km^{2} (0.386 sq mi or 247 acres) and river estuaries.

La Bazouge-de-Chemeré (French pronunciation: [la bazuʒ də ʃɛmʁe]; also La Bazouge-de-Chémeré) is a commune in the Mayenne department in northwestern France.

== Geography ==
The village stands on a promontory above the Vaige river. On the opposite side there are limestone quarries and old lime kilns.

The village stands at the far east of the Armorican Massif so the geology presents various facies : limestone, coal, rhyolite, slate, slate shale. There were anthracite mines dedicated to the lime kiln. The lime was used for liming (soil) until 1896 when chemical fertilizers have been available, so the lime kilns has stopped and also the mining because coal layers are not regular but spread in distant columns.

== History ==
In 1926 the lightning torched the bell tower then the church. The steeple cover has been built again shorter and the bells were cast again then baptized in 1930. But the fire has brought up covered frescoes of the 16th century showing the dictation of the three dead and the three alive (three skeletons tell three young men the life is short...)

== Economy ==
After being an industrial town in the 19th century with lime kilns, quarries and mining, La Bazouge-de-Chemeré returns mainly to agriculture in 20th century. Tourism starts 40 years ago with bed and breakfast and rural lodging in cottages. Nowadays a well-known Ultralight aviation aerodrome stands at the old mine.

== La Bazouge-de-Chemeré through artists ==
Some painters passed in the village :

- Felix Desille has painted a watercolor of the 'Hôtel du Porche'(Porch hotel) in 1914 and already wished its restoration.
- Giuseppe Tribus an Italian painter who had fled fascism in Italy and had taken refuge in the village has immortalized the roaring flyover of German bombers on 17 June 1940.
- Édouard Cortès, from a photography and by his invention, has depicted the church street, once 'a snowy evening' and once 'sunshine after rain' (circa 1945) as he used to paint Paris streets.

In 1950 Tribus has painted the porch of the hotel (demolished in 1960) and the church steeple.

Paintings
- The Porch hotel Felix Desille 1914, watercolor
- German bombers roaring over the village (june 17th 1940) Giuseppe Tribus circa 1944
- Porch of the Porch hotel and church steeple Anonymous circa 1950

- Sold painting : Edouard Cortes - La Bazouge-de-Chemere, a snowy evening (circa 1945)
- Sold painting : Edouard Cortes - La Bazouge-de-Chemere, sunshine after rain (circa 1945) strangely named 'south of France'

== Population ==
Historical population
Year	Pop.	±% p.a.
1968	592	—
1975	494	−2.55%
1982	447	−1.42%
1990	406	−1.20%
1999	443	+0.97%
2007	515	+1.90%
2012	524	+0.35%
2017	516	−0.31%
2023	497	−0.62%
Source: INSEE

== Gallery ==
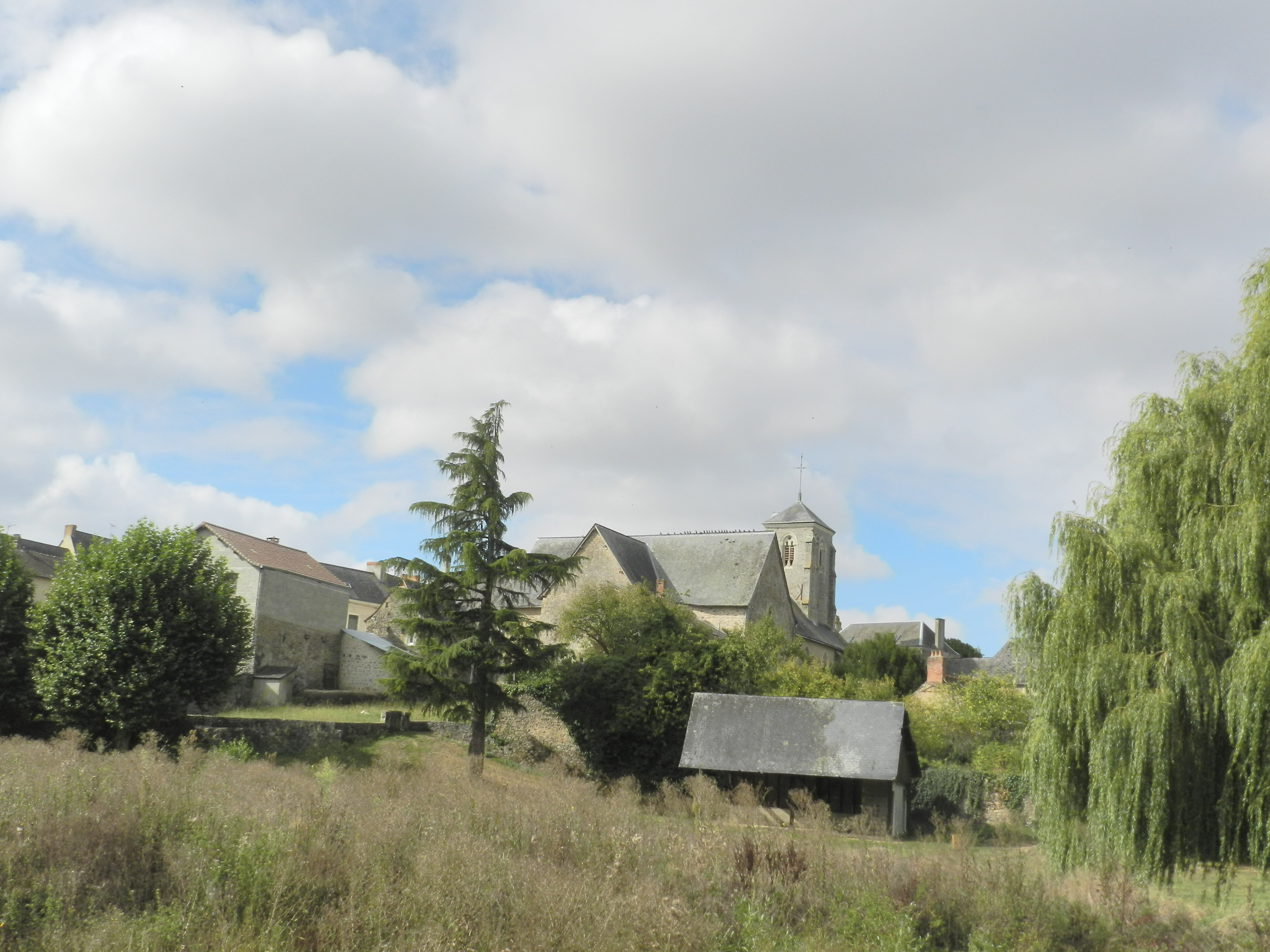
The village at the top of the promontory above the mere and the river

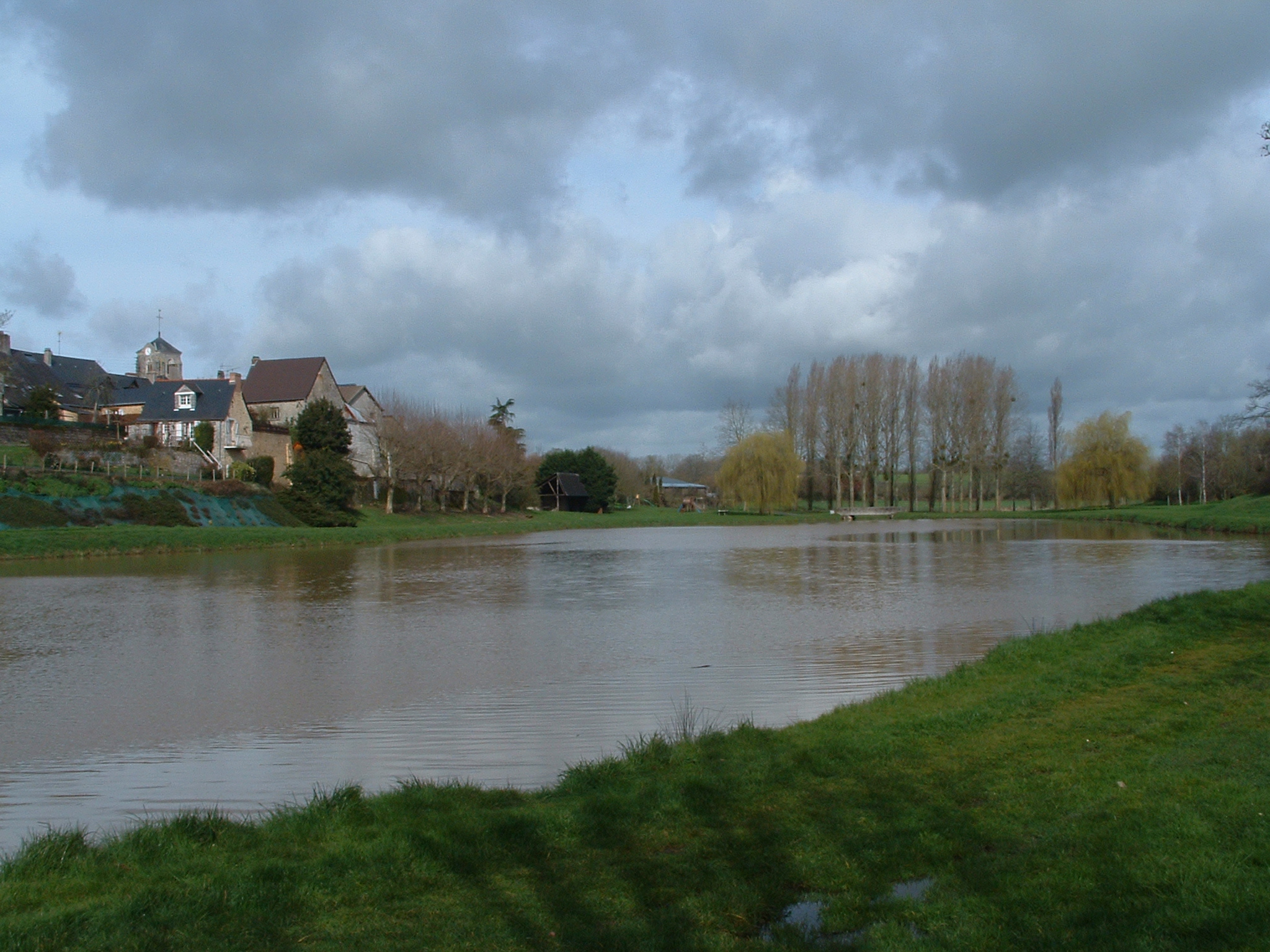
The village above the mere that the Vaige river has crossed until 2016 and now bypasses it

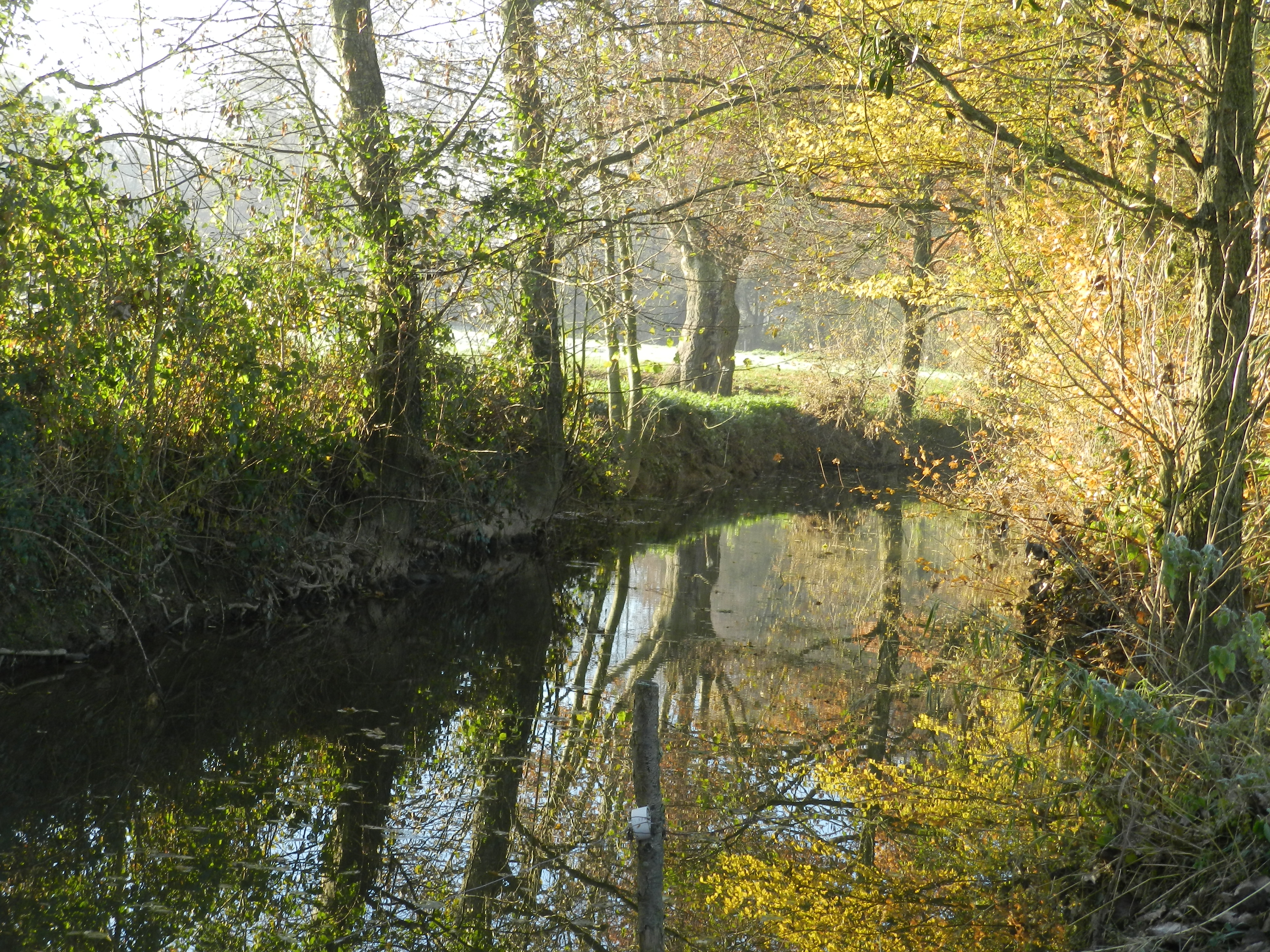
The Vaige river

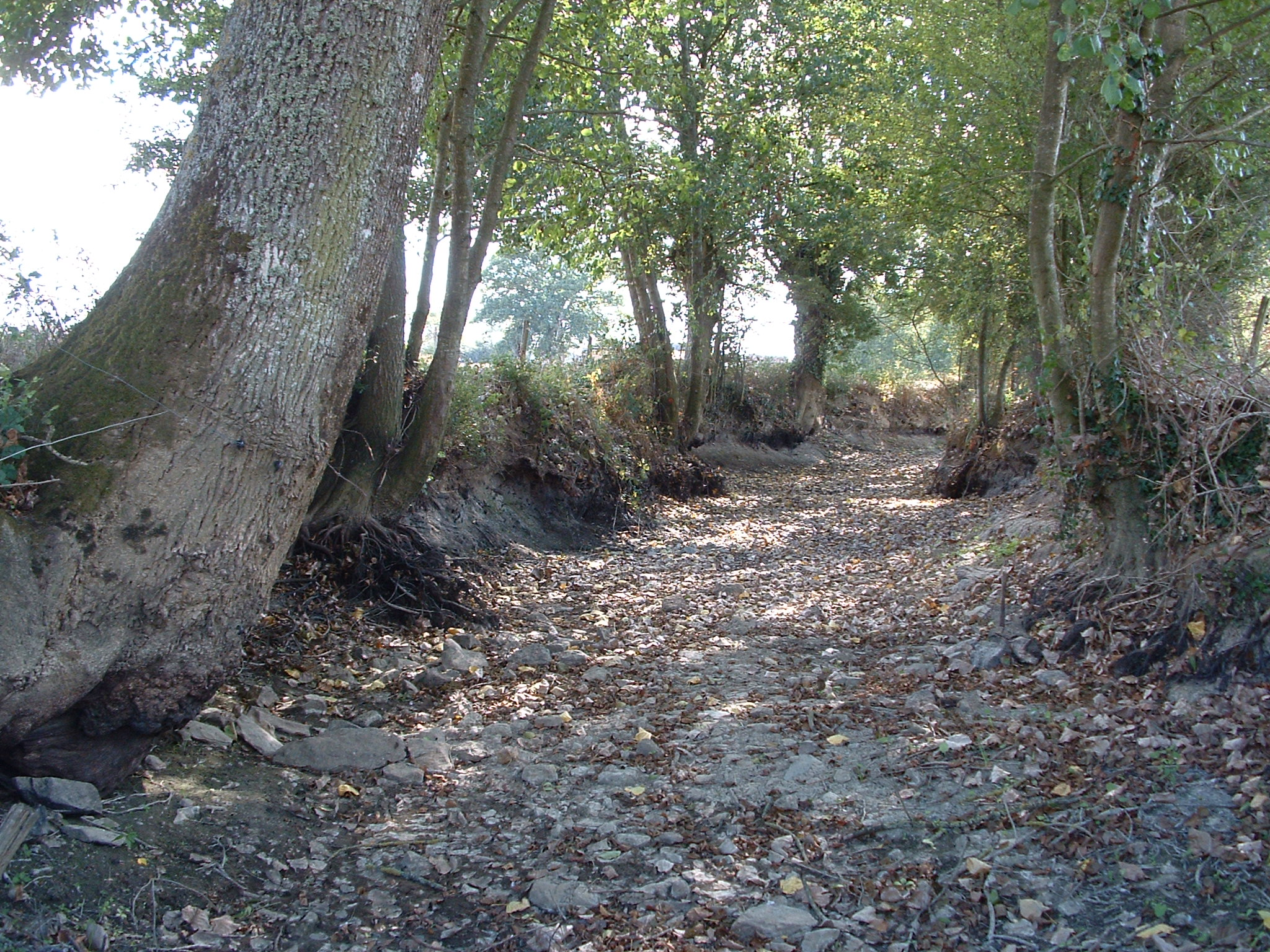
The dried Vaige river

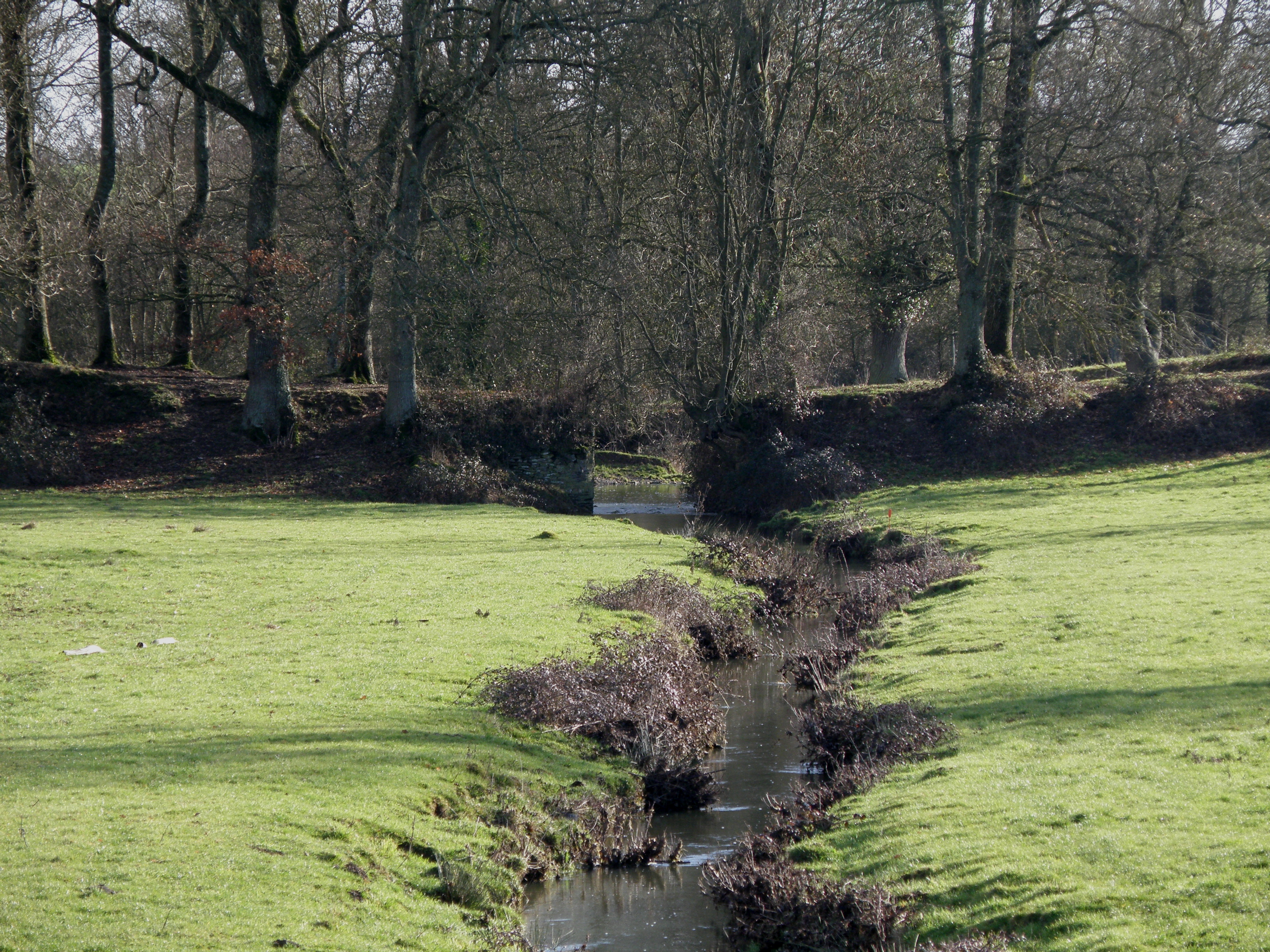
The Chemerette stream pass through an old path then flows in the Vaige river

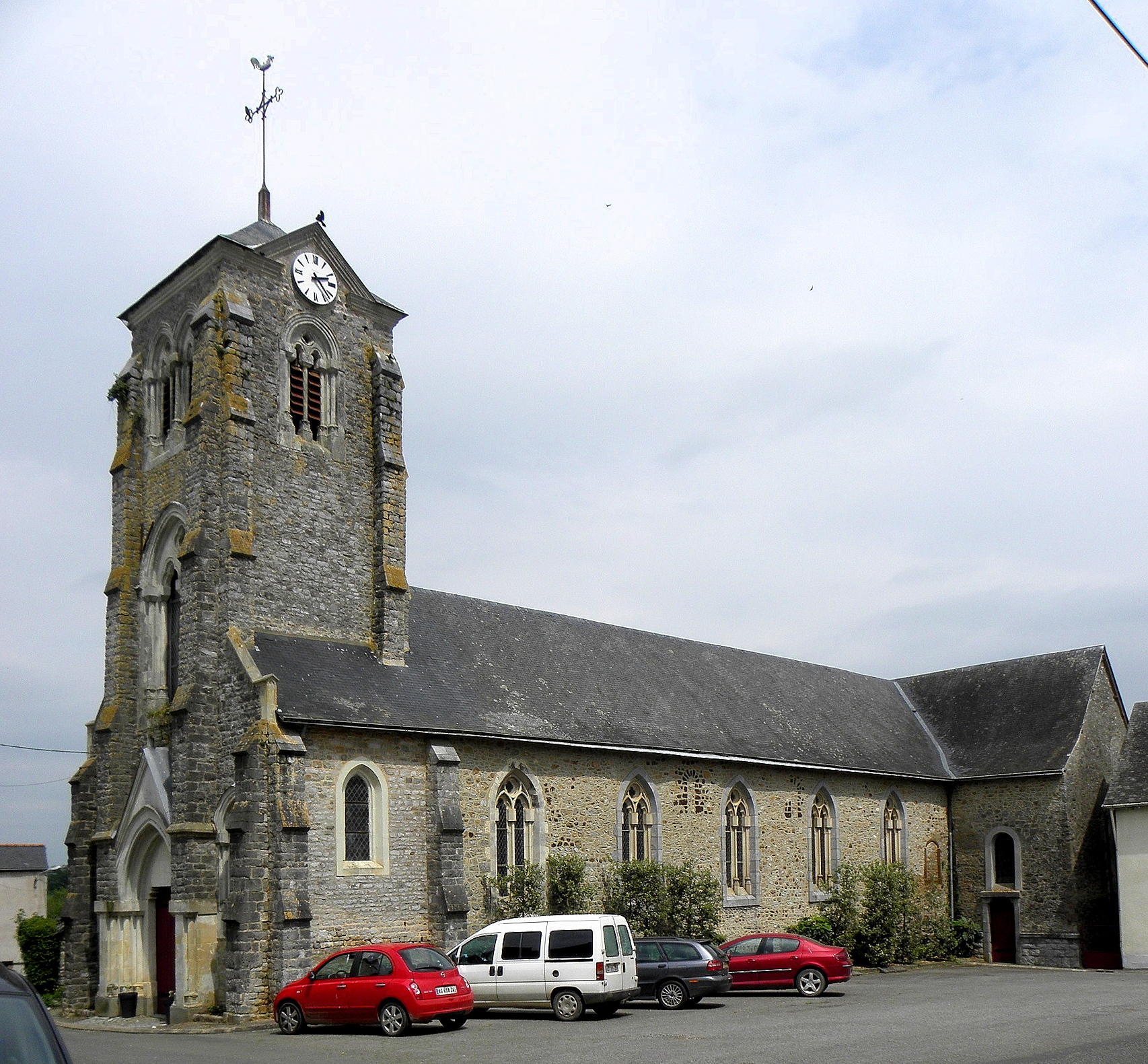
The church : known 12th c., frescos 16th c., extension and steeple 19th c., cover 20th c.

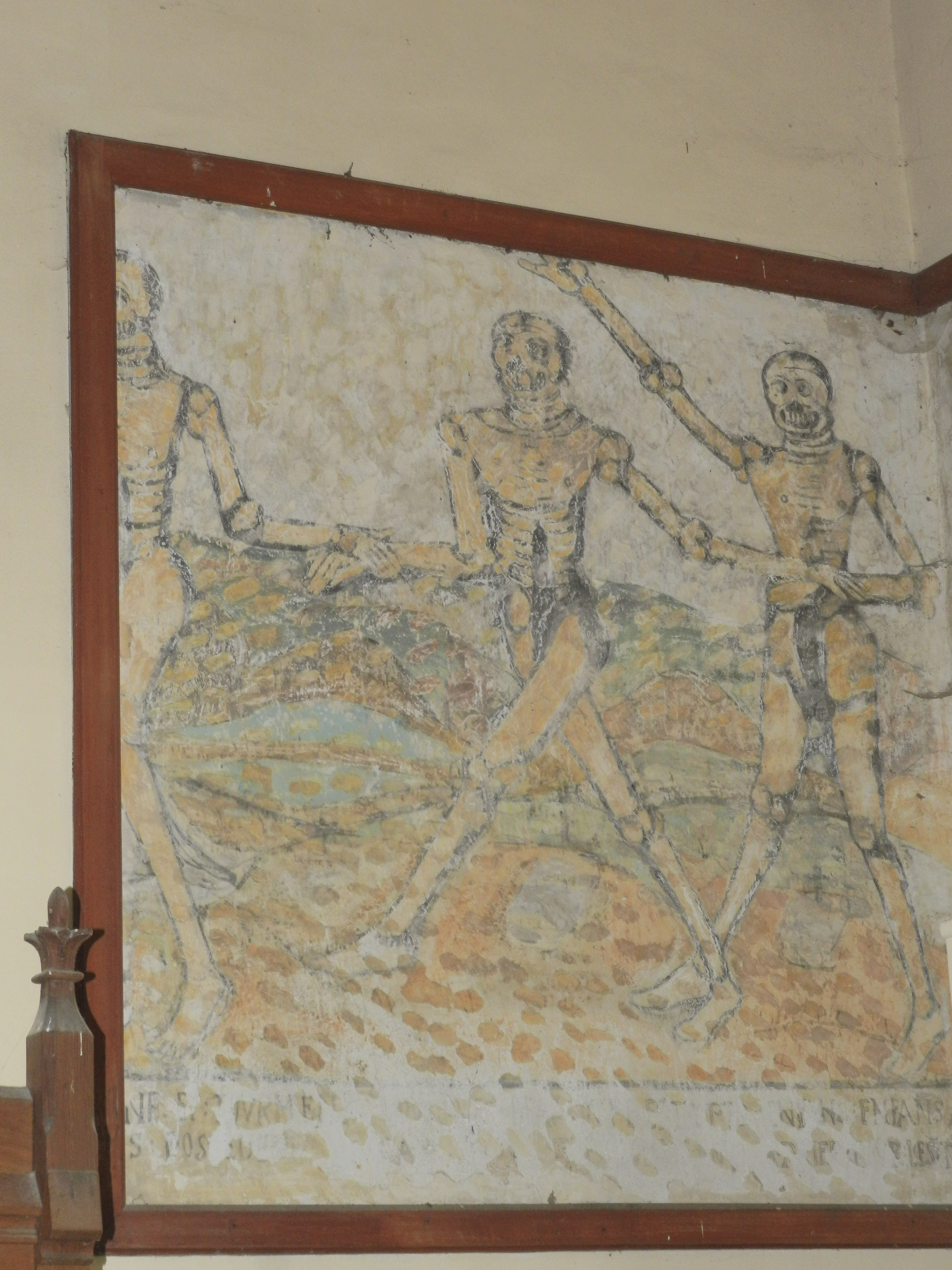
The dictation of the 3 dead and the 3 alive : the 3 dead (1585 fresco)

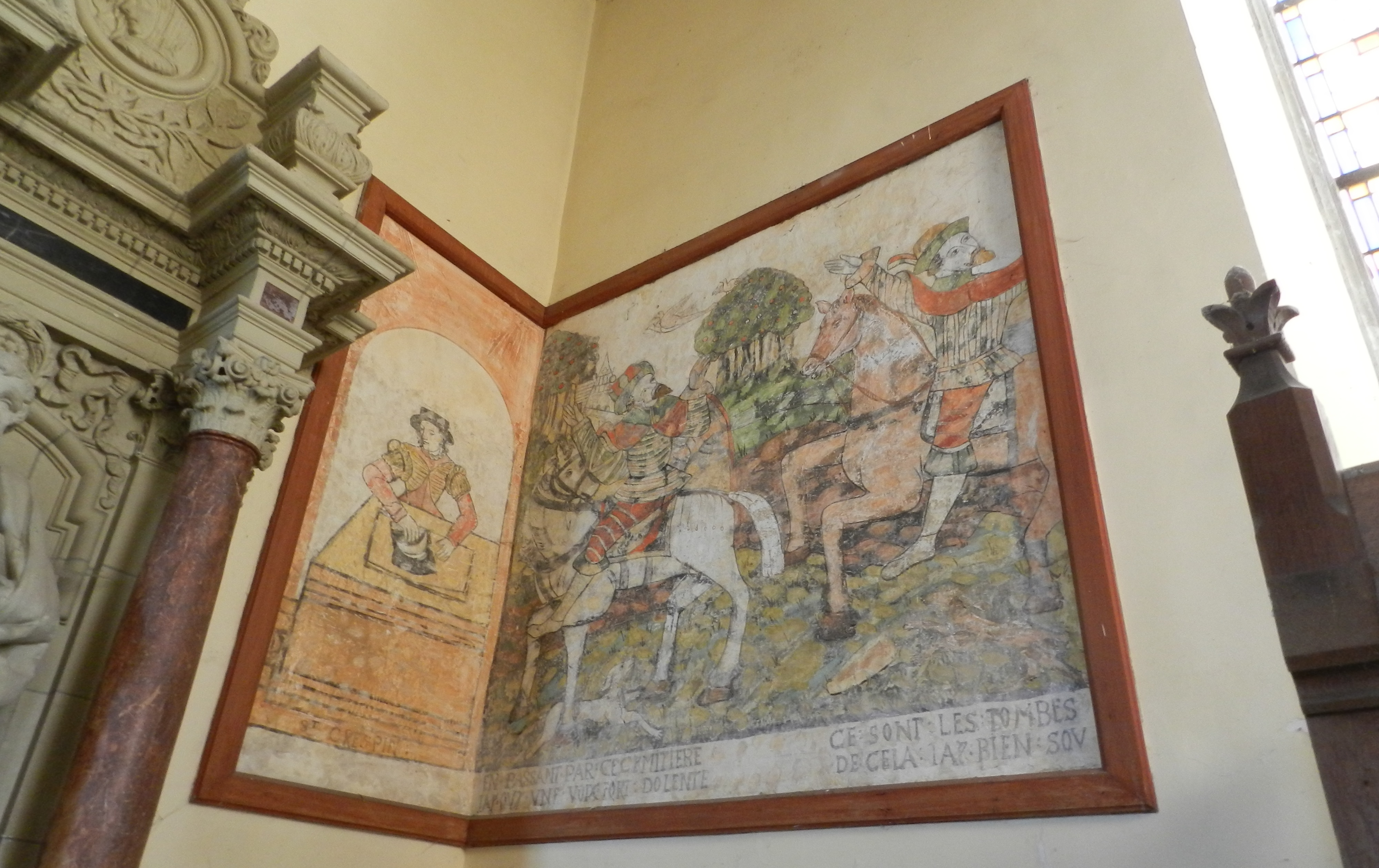
The dictation of the 3 dead and the 3 alive : the 3 alive (1585 fresco)

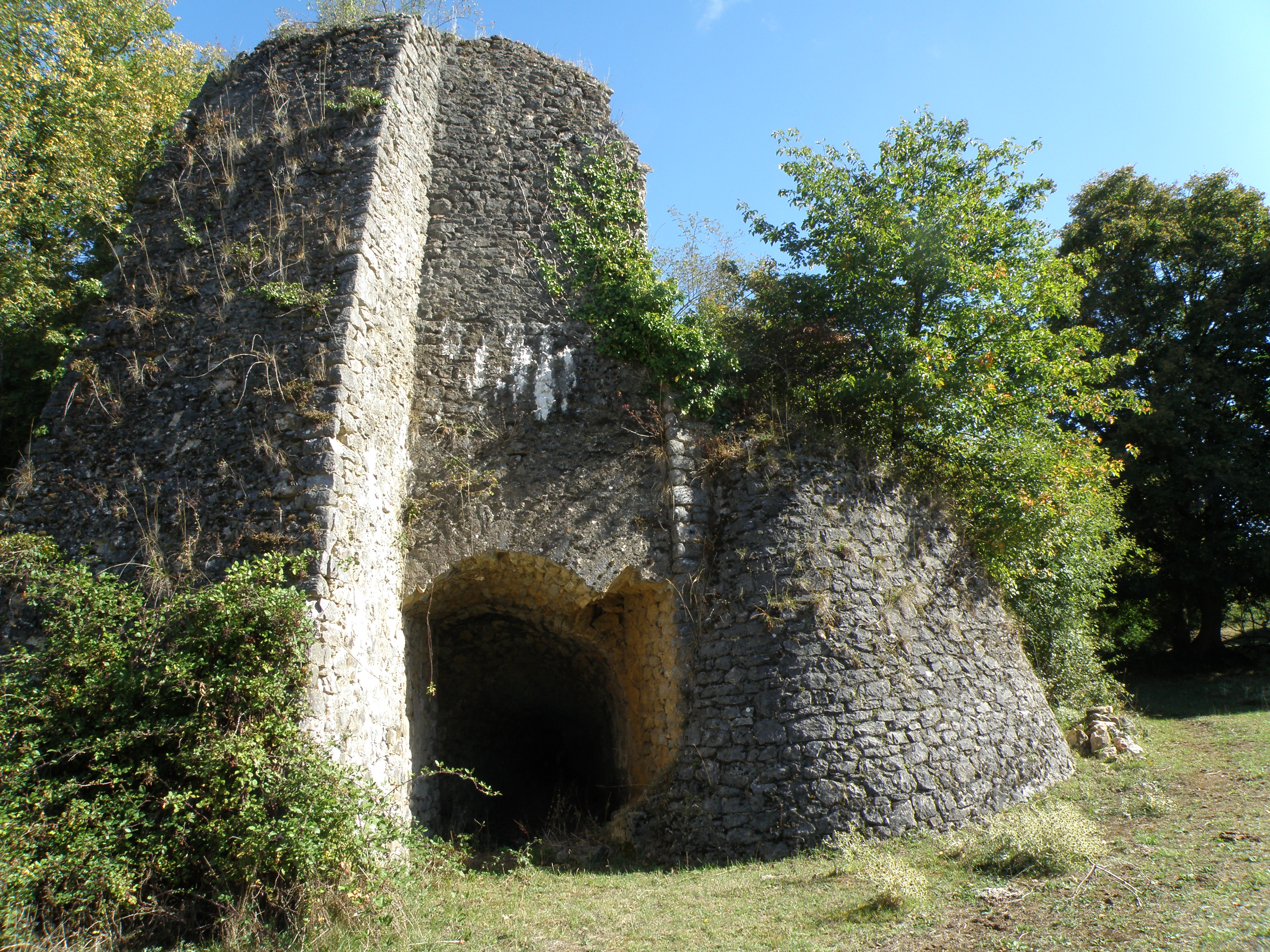
The Fortinière lime kiln

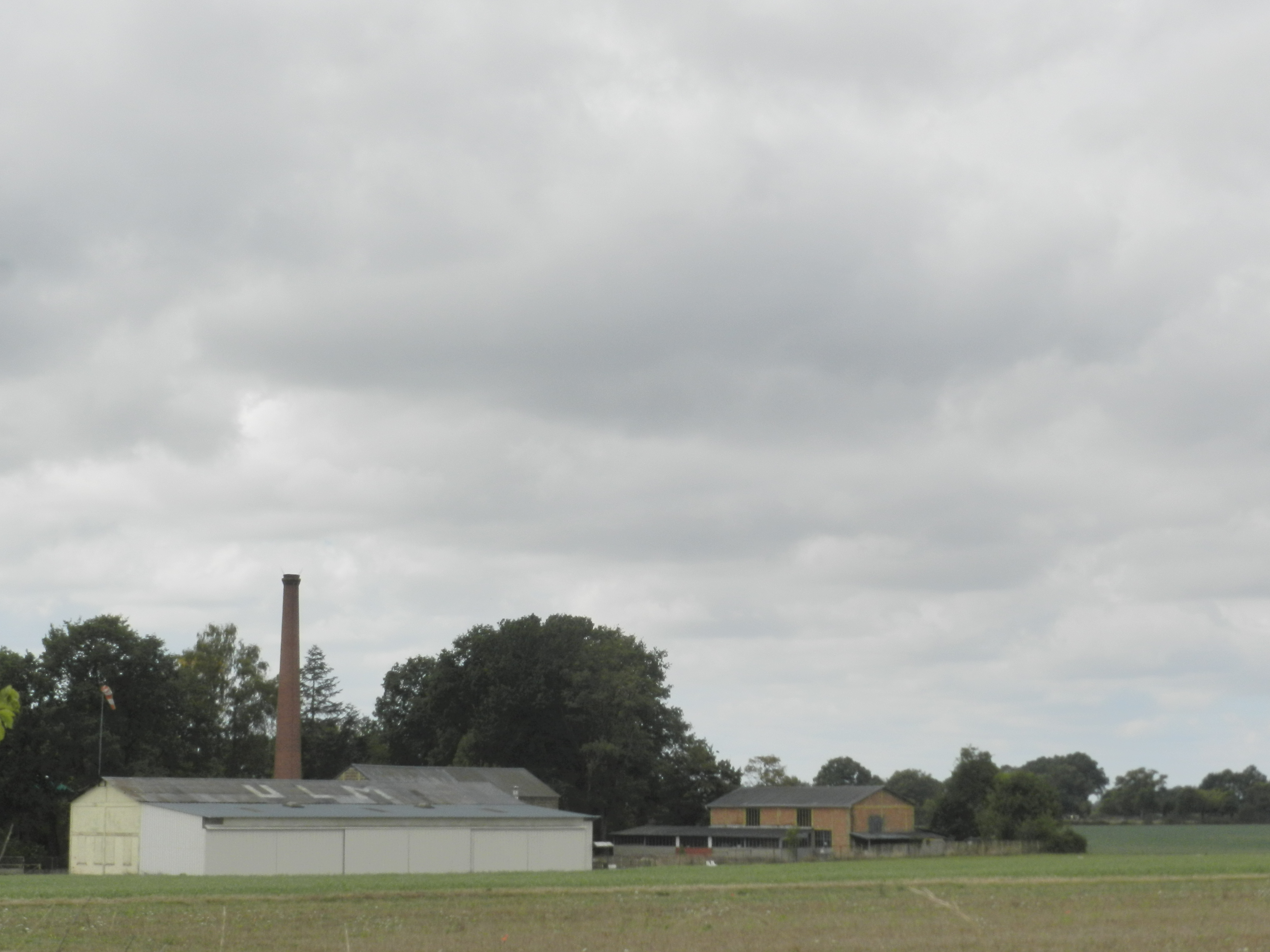
Ultralight aviation aerodrome at the old coal mine

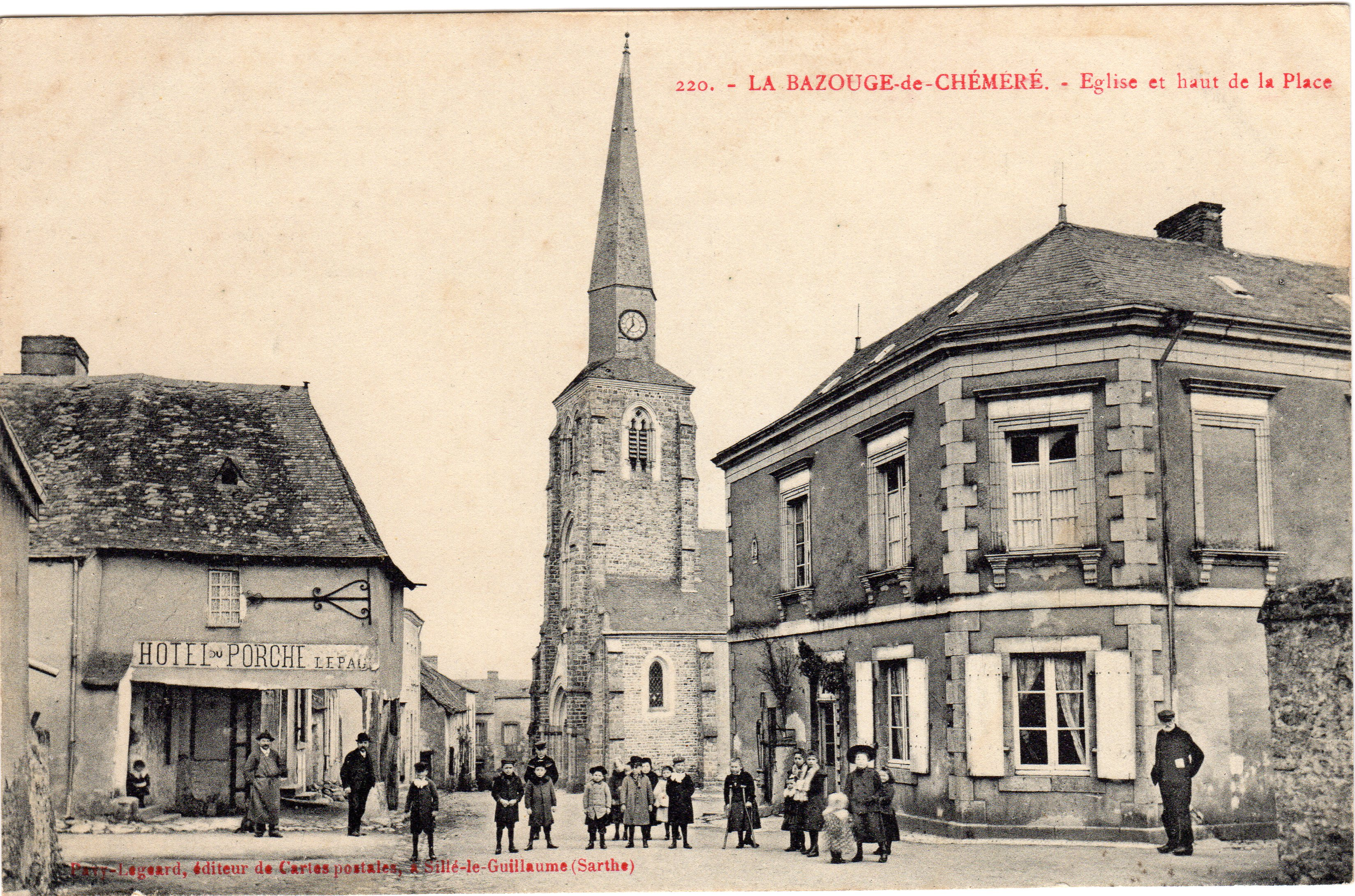
Old postcard showing the Porche hotel and the high church steeple before the 1926 fire and mostly the Édouard Cortès point of view

== See also ==
- Communes of Mayenne
