= La Bazouge-des-Alleux =

- Commune
- Coat of arms
- Location of La Bazouge-des-Alleux
- Location within France Location within Pays de la Loire
- Coordinates: 48°11′03″N 0°36′32″W
- Country: France
- Region: Pays de la Loire
- Department: Mayenne
- Arrondissement: Mayenne
- Canton: Évron

Government
  - Mayor (2020–2026): Bernard Gérault
- Area^{1}: 18.10 km^{2} (6.99 sq mi)
- Elevation: 130 m (430 ft)
- Highest elevation: 146 m (479 ft)
- Lowest elevation: 76 m (249 ft)
- Population (2023): 558
  - Density: 30.8/km^{2} (79.8/sq mi)
- Time zone: UTC+01:00 (CET)
  - Summer (DST): UTC+02:00 (CEST)
- INSEE/Postal code: 53023 /53470
- ^{1} French Land Register data, which excludes lakes, ponds, glaciers > 1 km^{2} (0.386 sq mi or 247 acres) and river estuaries.

La Bazouge-des-Alleux (French pronunciation: [la bazuʒ de.z‿alø]) is a commune in the Mayenne department in northwestern France.

== Population ==
Historical population
Year	Pop.	±% p.a.
1968	286	—
1975	260	−1.35%
1982	249	−0.62%
1990	261	+0.59%
1999	262	+0.04%
2007	383	+4.86%
2012	508	+5.81%
2017	544	+1.38%
2023	558	+0.42%
Source: INSEE

== See also ==
- Communes of Mayenne
