= Canton of Évron =

Canton in Mayenne department, France

Coordinates: 48.15°N 0.40°W

The canton of Évron is an administrative division of the Mayenne department, northwestern France. Its borders were modified at the French canton reorganisation which came into effect in March 2015. Its seat is in Évron.

It consists of the following communes:

1. Assé-le-Bérenger
2. Bais
3. La Bazouge-des-Alleux
4. Brée
5. Champgenéteux
6. Évron
7. Hambers
8. Izé
9. Livet
10. Mézangers
11. Montsûrs
12. Neau
13. Sainte-Gemmes-le-Robert
14. Saint-Georges-sur-Erve
15. Saint-Thomas-de-Courceriers
16. Trans
17. Vimartin-sur-Orthe
18. Voutré
