= Cussey-sur-Lison =

- Commune
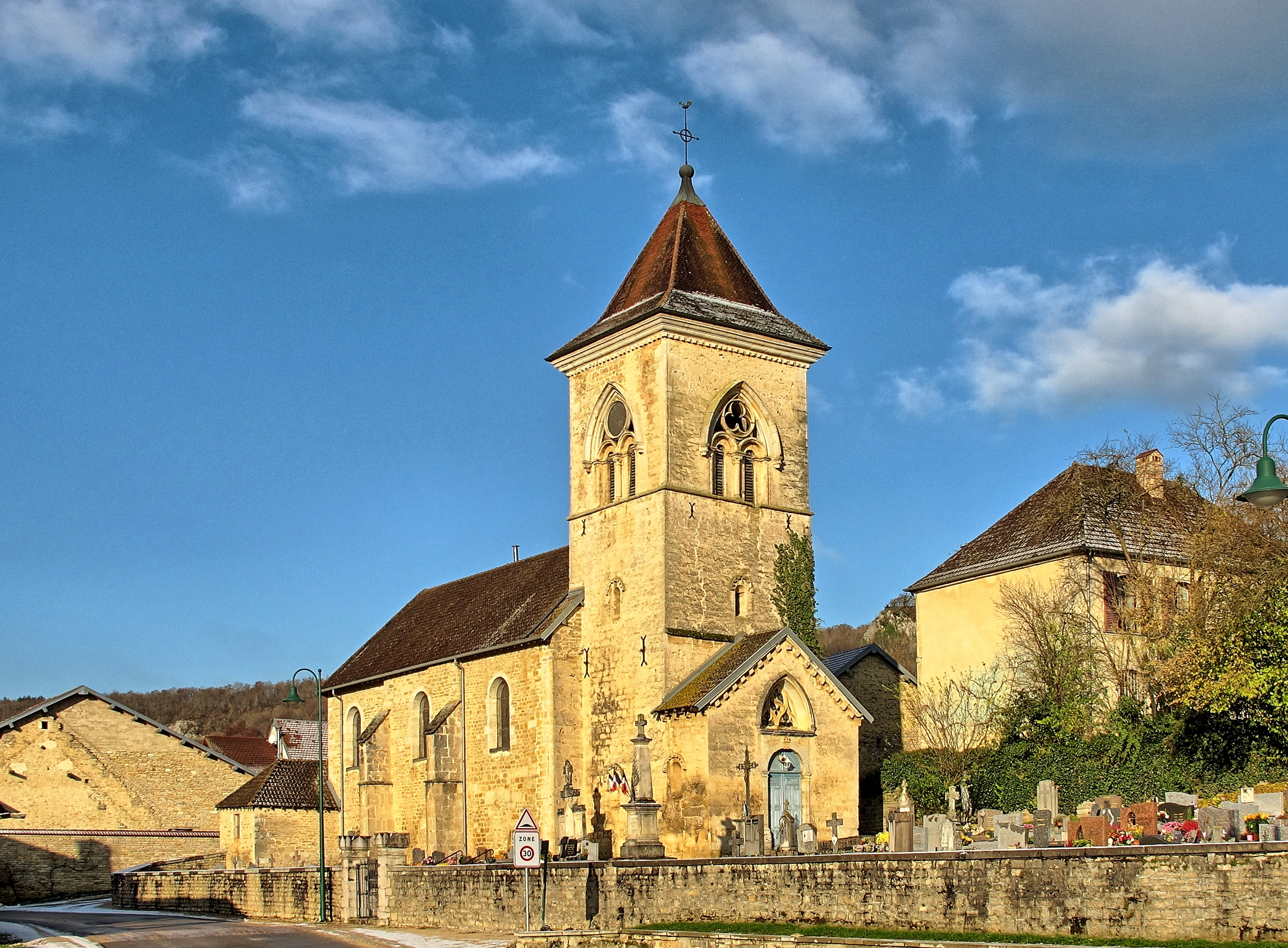
- The Church of Saint Christopher of Cussey-sur-Lison
- Location of Cussey-sur-Lison
- Location within France Location within Bourgogne-Franche-Comté
- Coordinates: 47°03′38″N 5°57′21″E
- Country: France
- Region: Bourgogne-Franche-Comté
- Department: Doubs
- Arrondissement: Besançon
- Canton: Saint-Vit
- Intercommunality: Loue-Lison

Government
  - Mayor (2022–2026): Jean-Marie Roussel
- Area^{1}: 8.55 km^{2} (3.30 sq mi)
- Highest elevation: 478 m (1,568 ft)
- Lowest elevation: 285 m (935 ft)
- Population (2023): 68
  - Density: 8.0/km^{2} (21/sq mi)
- Time zone: UTC+01:00 (CET)
  - Summer (DST): UTC+02:00 (CEST)
- INSEE/Postal code: 25185 /25440
- ^{1} French Land Register data, which excludes lakes, ponds, glaciers > 1 km^{2} (0.386 sq mi or 247 acres) and river estuaries.

Cussey-sur-Lison (French pronunciation: [kyse syʁ lizɔ̃]) is a commune in the Doubs department in the Bourgogne-Franche-Comté region in the cultural and historical region of Franche-Comté in eastern France. On 1 January 2022 it merged with the former commune of Châtillon-sur-Lison to form the new commune of Cussey-sur-Lison.

The commune of Cussey-sur-Lison is composed of one village and three other settlements :

- The village of Cussey-sur-Lison
- Les Granges de Châtillon-sur-Lison
- Le Château de Châtillon-sur-Lison
- Les Forges de Châtillon-sur-Lison

== Geography ==
Cussey-sur-Lison is located 30 km (18 mi) south of Besançon, 23 km (14 mi) west of Ornans, 17 km (10 mi) north of Salins-les-Bains and 15 km (9 mi) east of Quingey.

The little village of Cussey sits on the left bank of the river Lison. It is surrounded by wooden hills whose cliffs stand up to 150 meters (500 ft) above the village valley. This typical landscape of the Jura Mountains is called a "reculée".

The creek Goulue flows through the village where five bridges cross it. An ancient mill "le Moulin du Dessus" (former oil mill and sawmill) is located down the creek before it empties into the river Lison.

The lower part of the commune lies in the Lison river Valley, where a bridge from 1793 crosses it to reach the village of Lizine. A dam and a mill "le Moulin du Bas" (former nail factory and then electric power station) were built by the river.

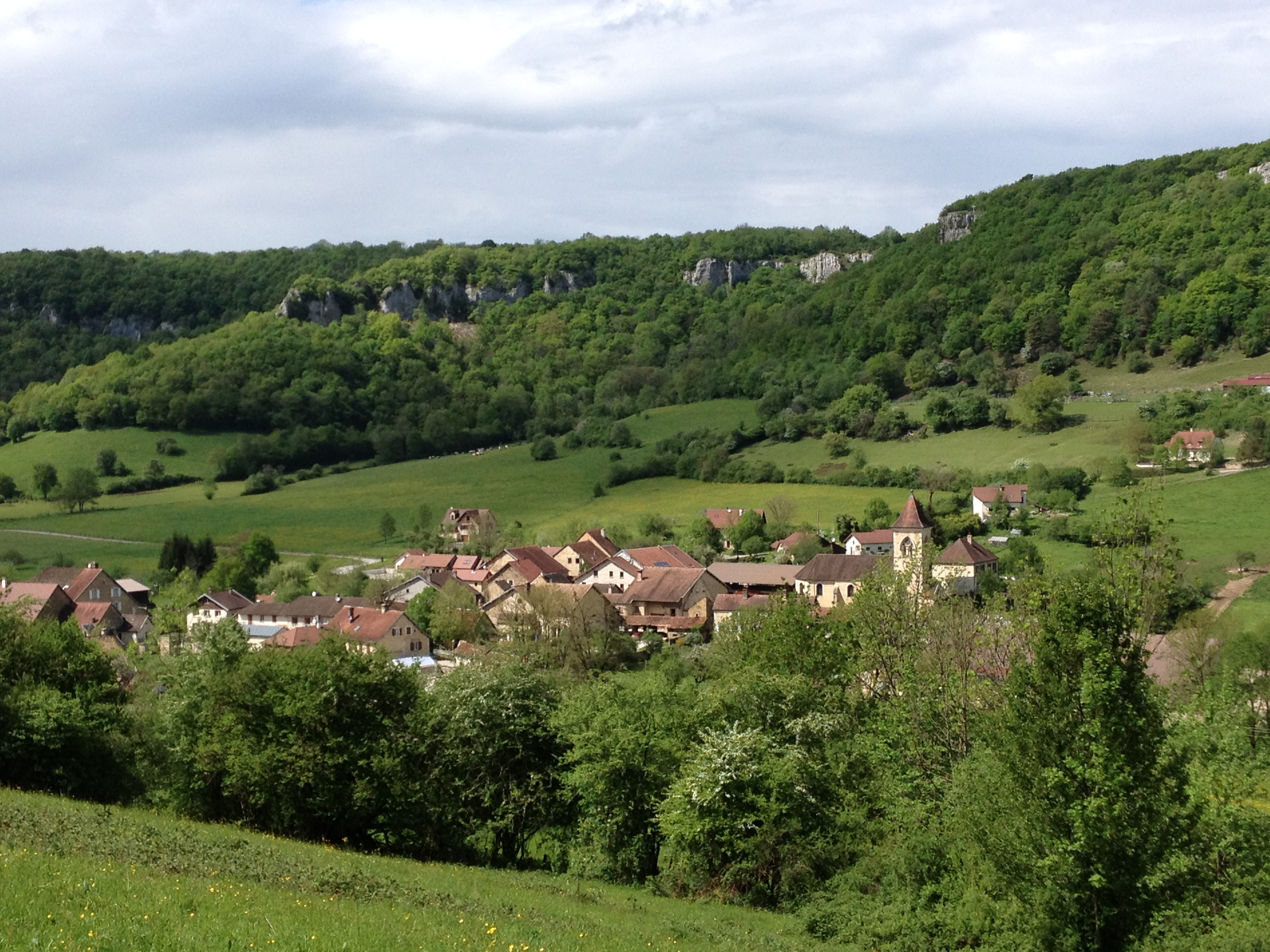
A view of the village from a hill

=== Toponymy ===
The name of the village would come from a Celtic root *cus meaning "rock" or from a pre-Celtic hydronymic root *cus-/cos-.

== History ==
Traces of occupation dating back from the Roman era were found at the end of the 19th century, and recently many items from the Celtic times.

During the Middle Ages, the village was a fief of the Seigneurie de Montfort and close to the Seigneurie of Châtillon. The Church of Saint Christopher would have been founded between the 5th and the 10th century, built in Romanesque style with a single nave. Thus the base of the bell tower can be dated from the 12th century and the upper part from the 14th century due to some Gothic decorative elements.

From the Middle Ages to the Late modern period, the Cussey parish extended to the neighboring villages of Echay, Bartherans and the Castle and Les Granges ("the Barns") of Châtillon.

In 1544, the Holy Roman Emperor and King of Spains Charles V authorized the Seigneur de Montfort, knight of honor of the Dole Parlement, to build a bridge on the river Lison instead of a ferry.

In the Early modern period, the village suffered from various disasters : plunder by Swedish soldiers during the Ten Years' War (local name for the Thirty Years' War), the French conquest by Louis XIV and also plague and famine during the 17th century. The population dwindled from 44 households in 1614 to 12 households in 1688.

in 1839, an 18 meter (60 feet) high zinc spire was built on the bell tower of the Church. It was torn down in 1966.

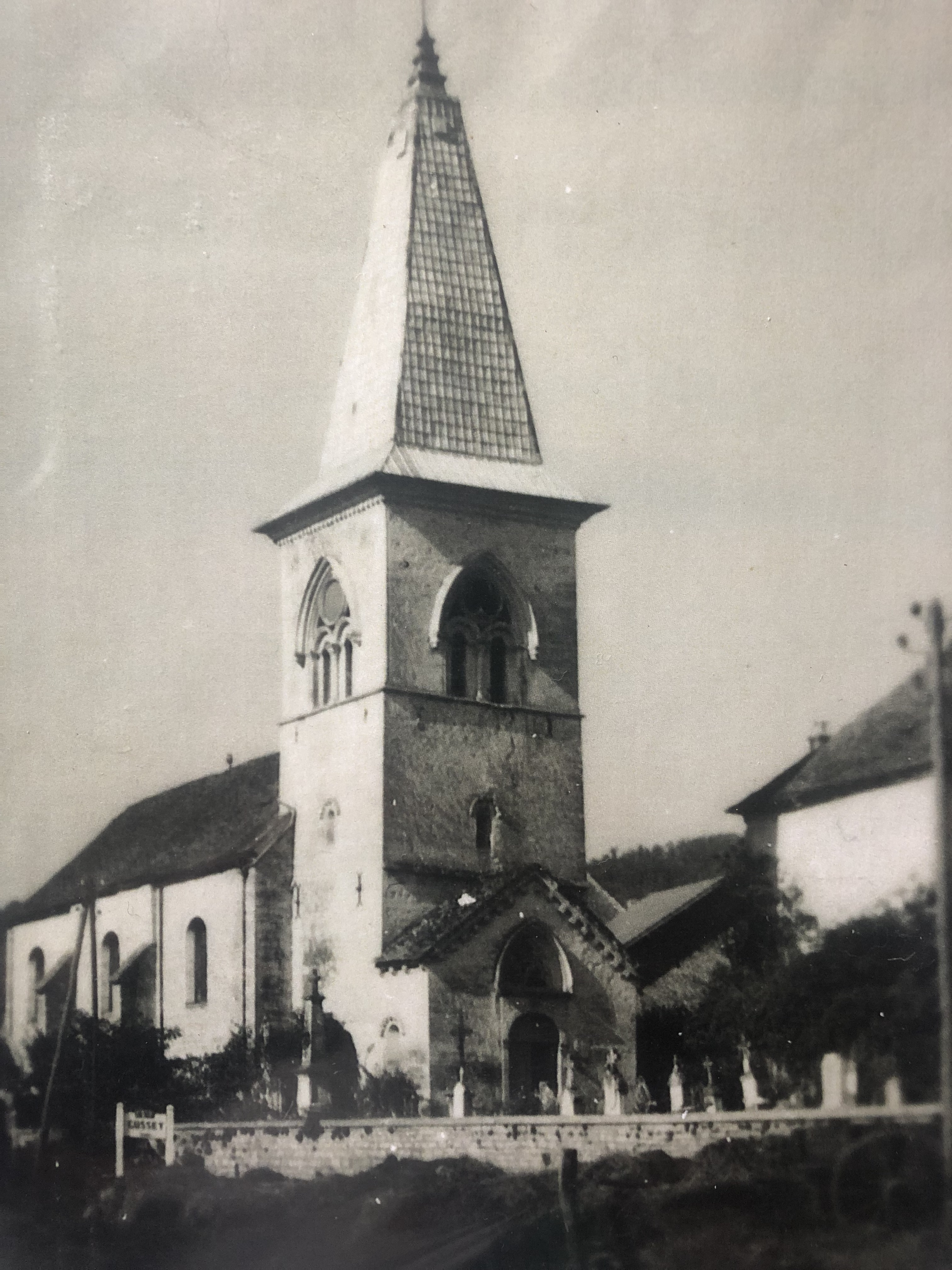
The Church of Cussey with its zinc spire before 1966

== Population ==
Population data refer to the area corresponding with the commune as of January 2025.

Historical population
Year	Pop.	±% p.a.
1968	105	—
1975	77	−4.33%
1982	61	−3.27%
1990	52	−1.98%
1999	77	+4.46%
2007	88	+1.68%
2012	70	−4.47%
2017	74	+1.12%
2023	68	−1.40%
Source: INSEE

== Gallery ==
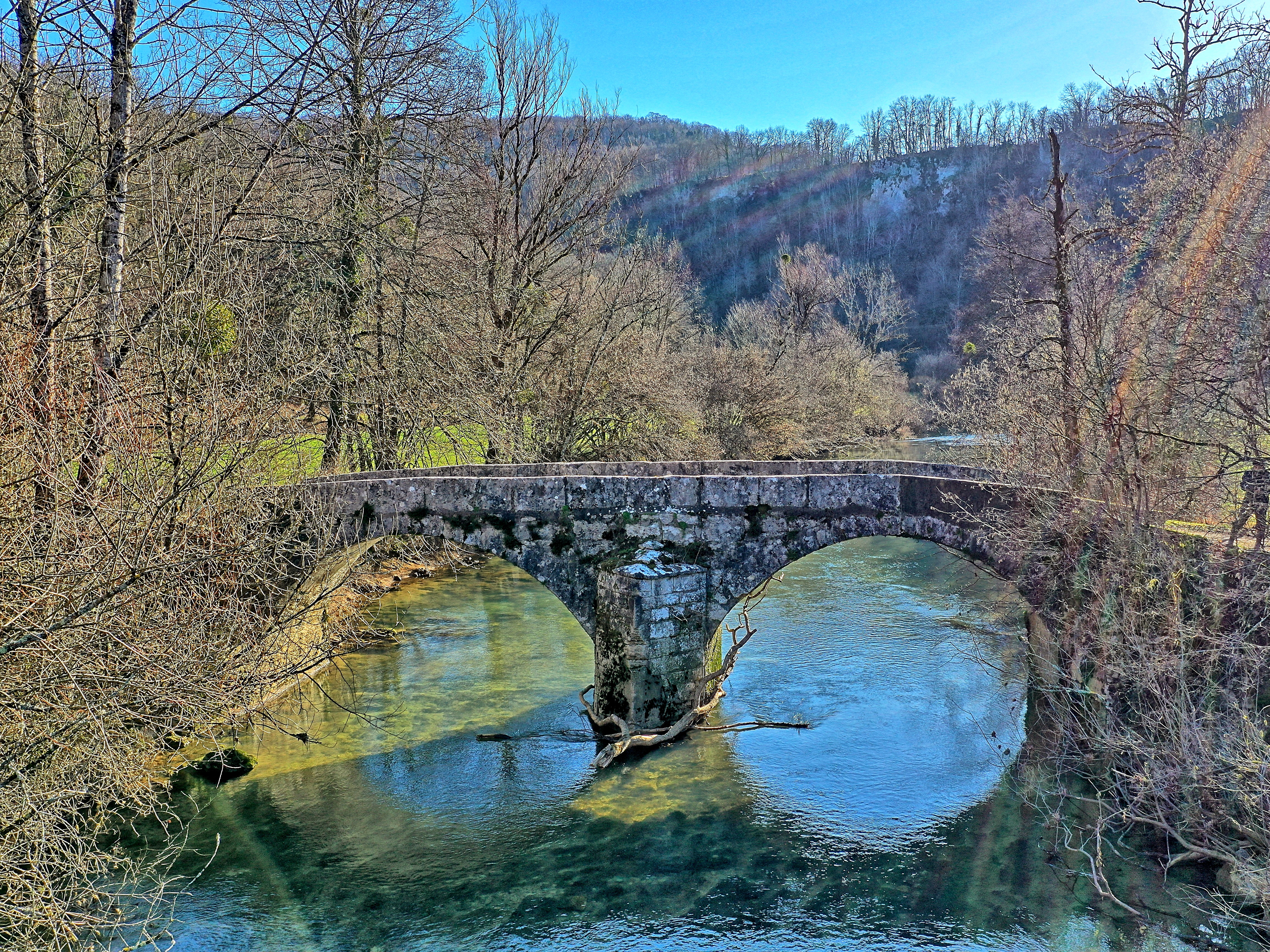
Bridge on the river Lison

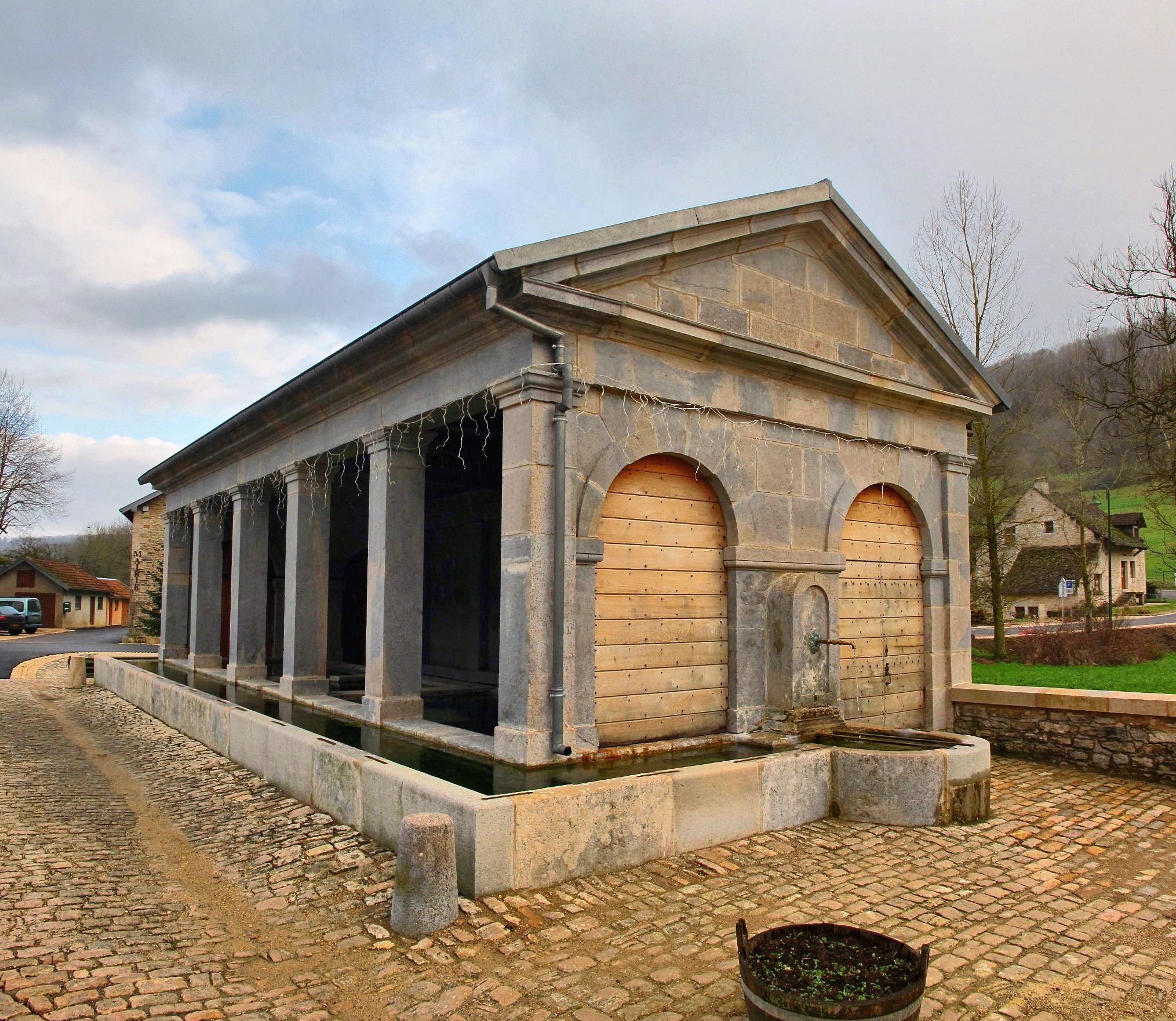
Fountain-lavoir in the village of Cussey

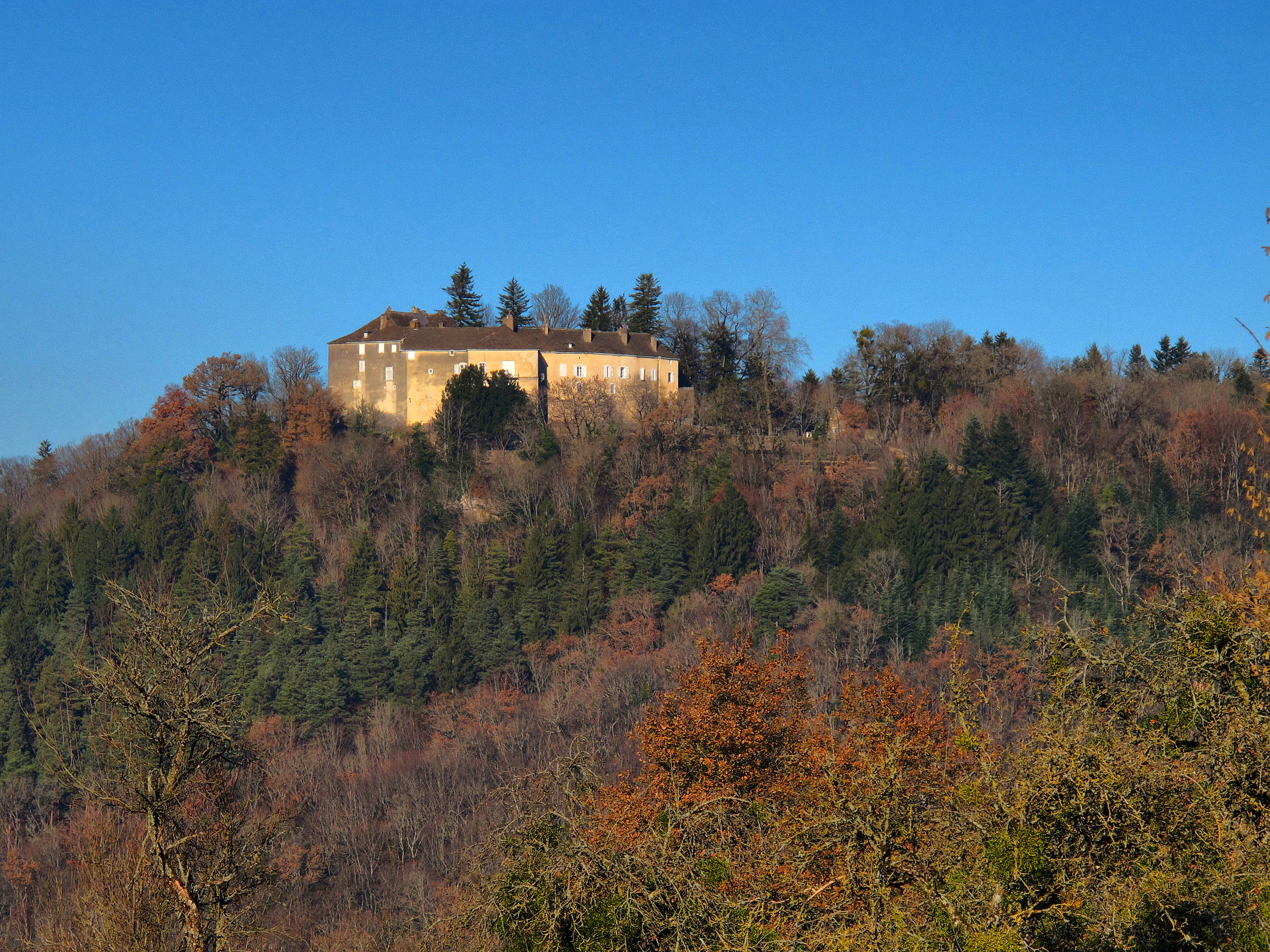
Castle of Châtillon

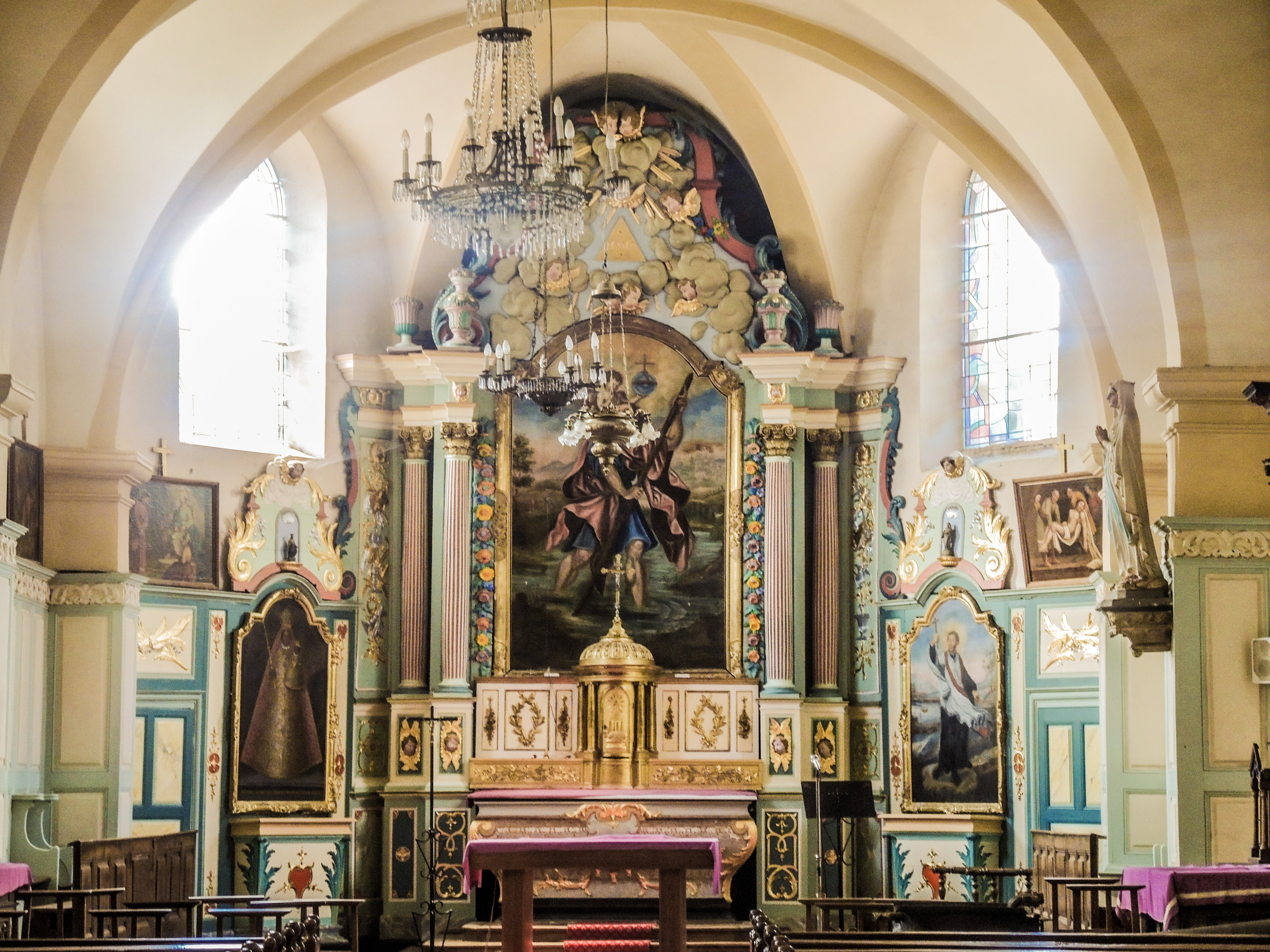
Choir of the Church of Cussey-sur-Lison

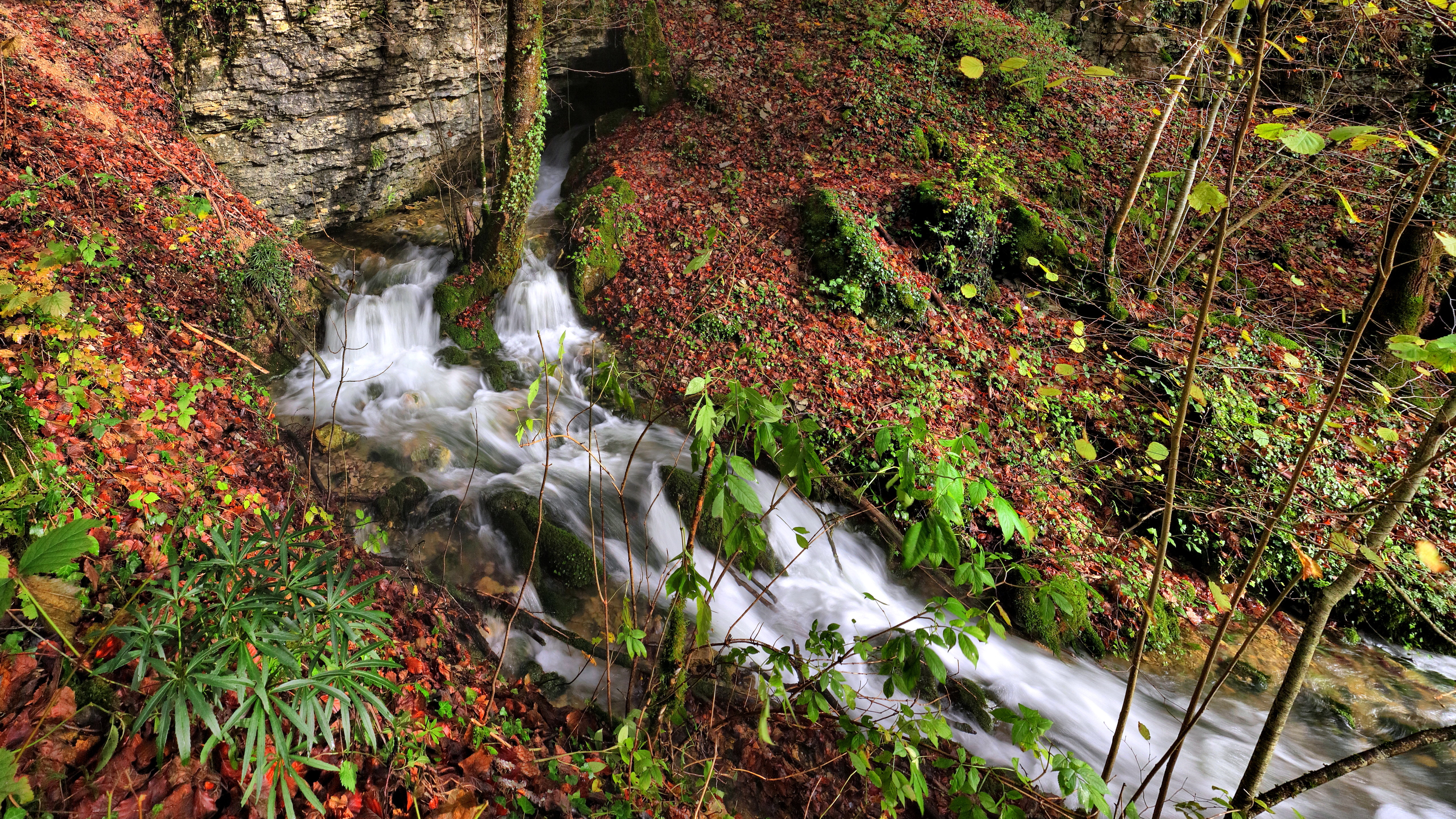
Source of the creek Goulue

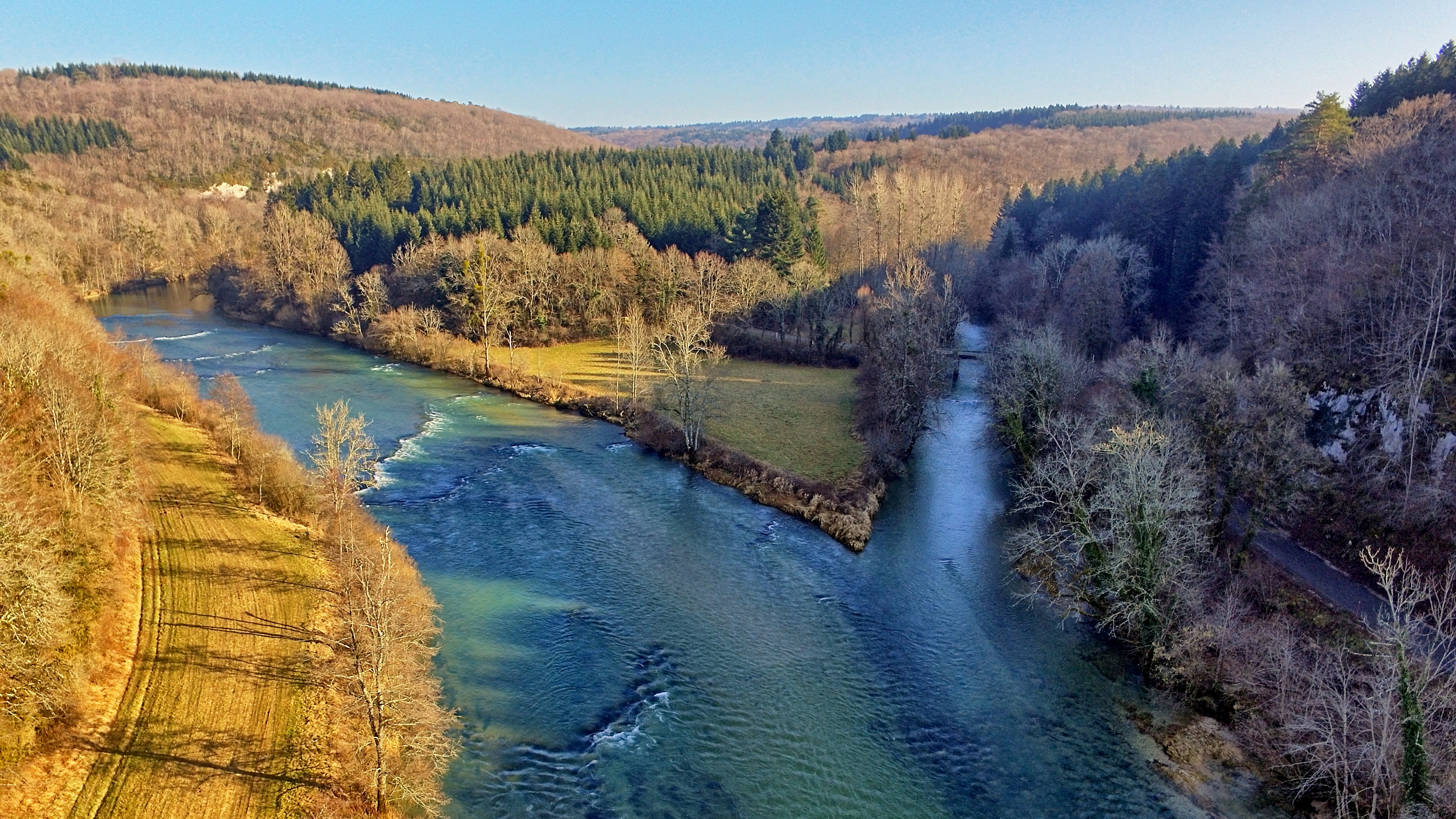
Confluence of the river Loue (left) and the river Lison (right)

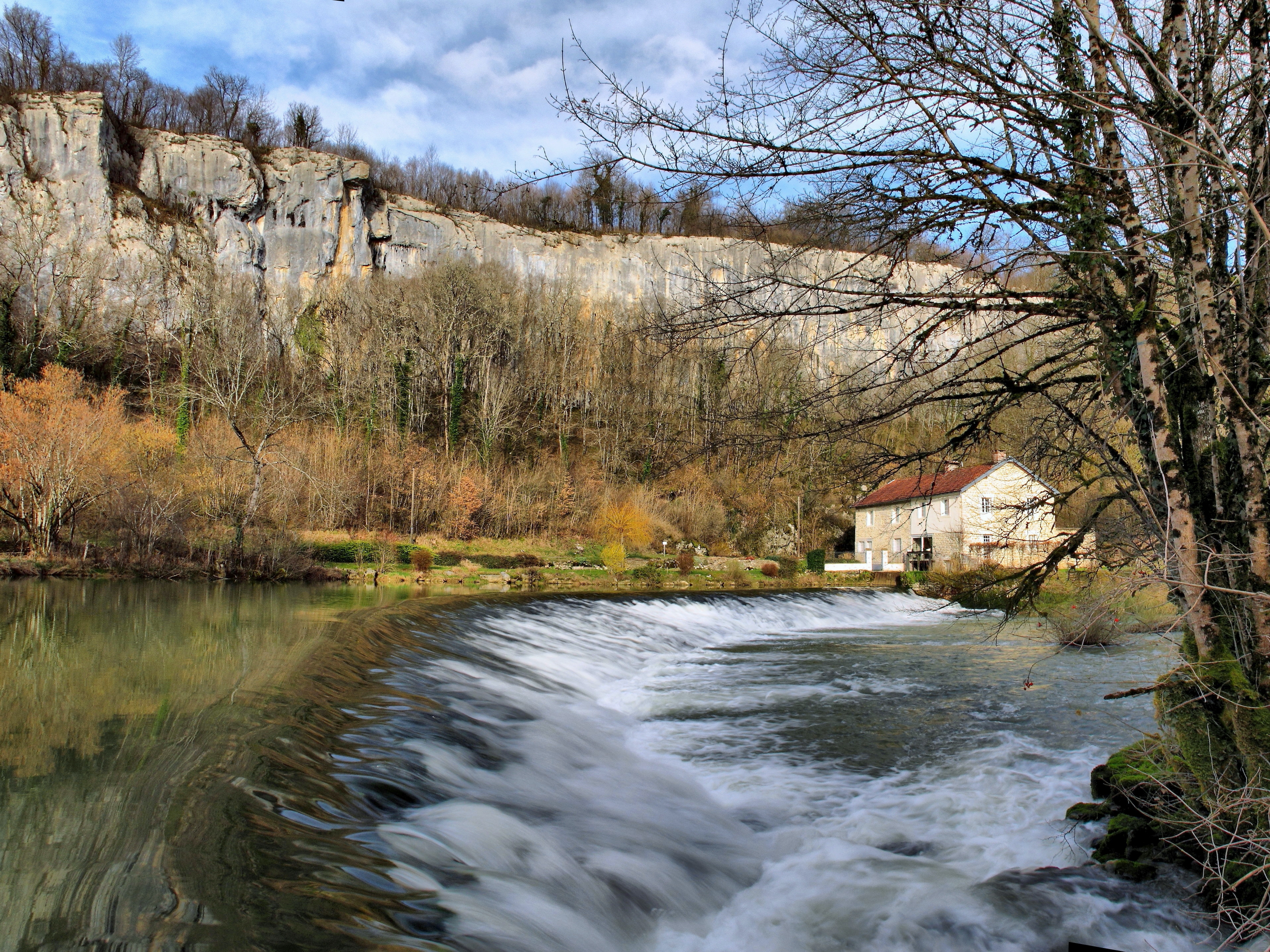
Dam and former mill on the river Lison

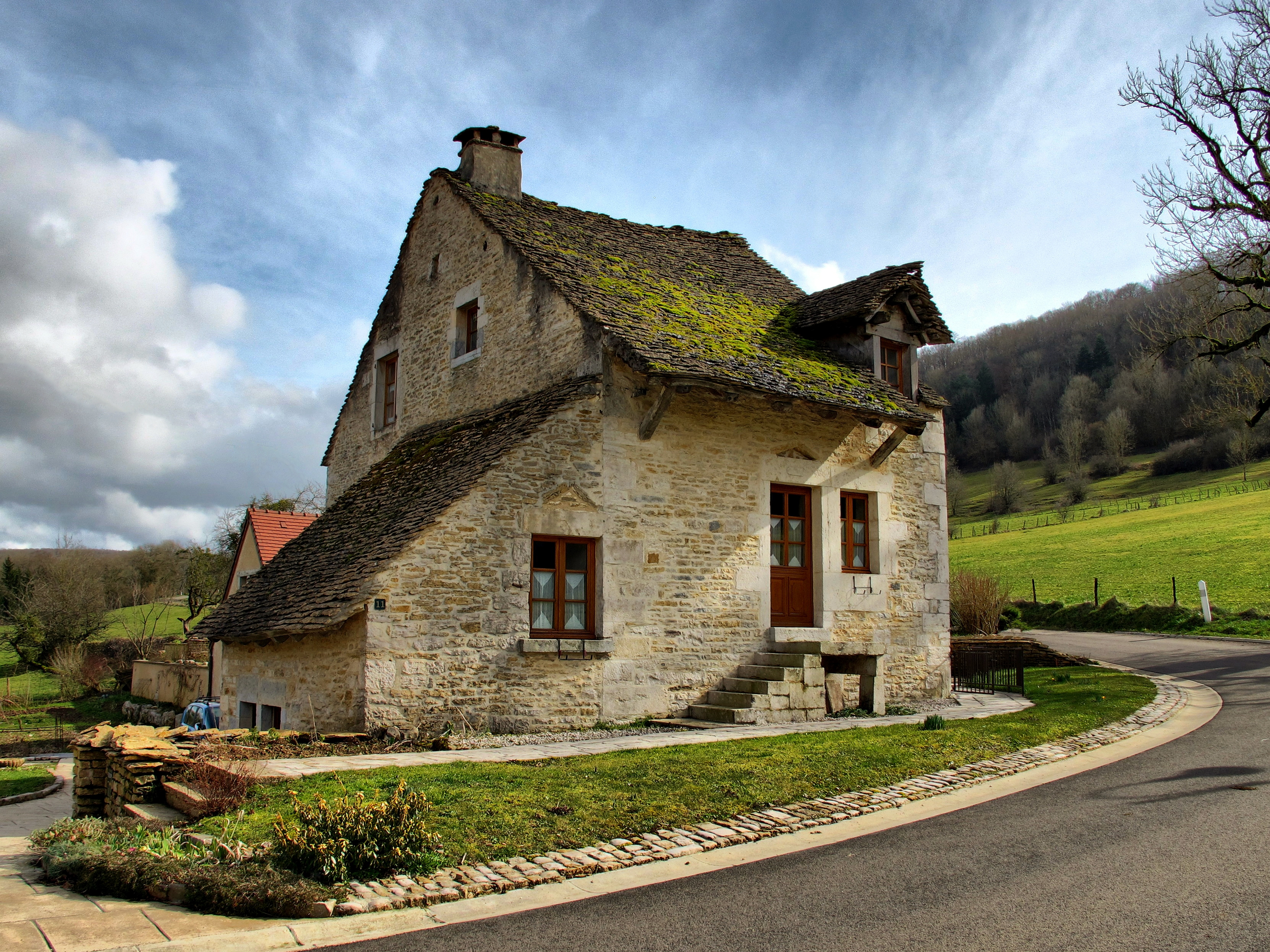
Old house with a stone roof

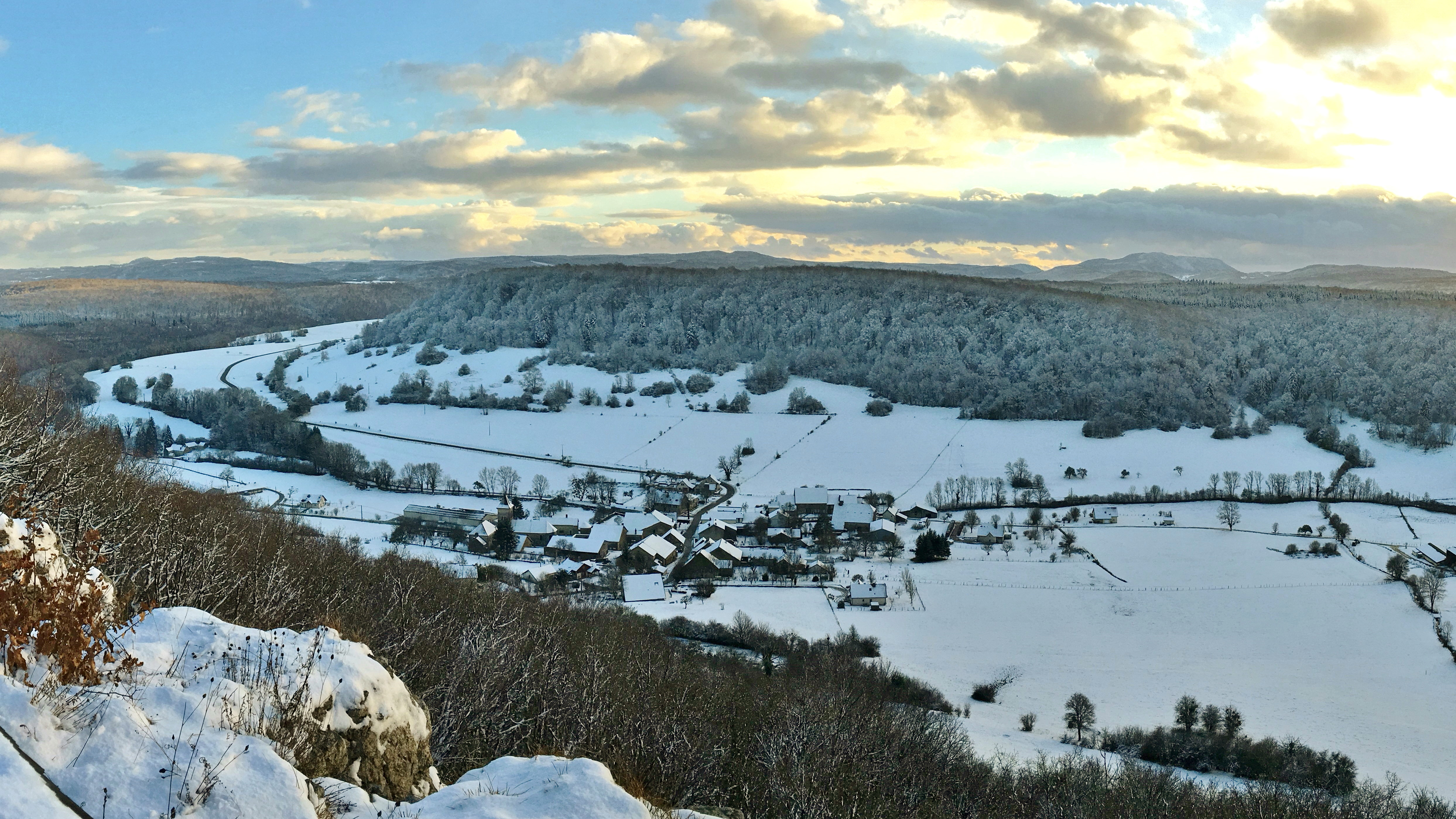
A view of the village of Cussey in the snow from a nearby hill

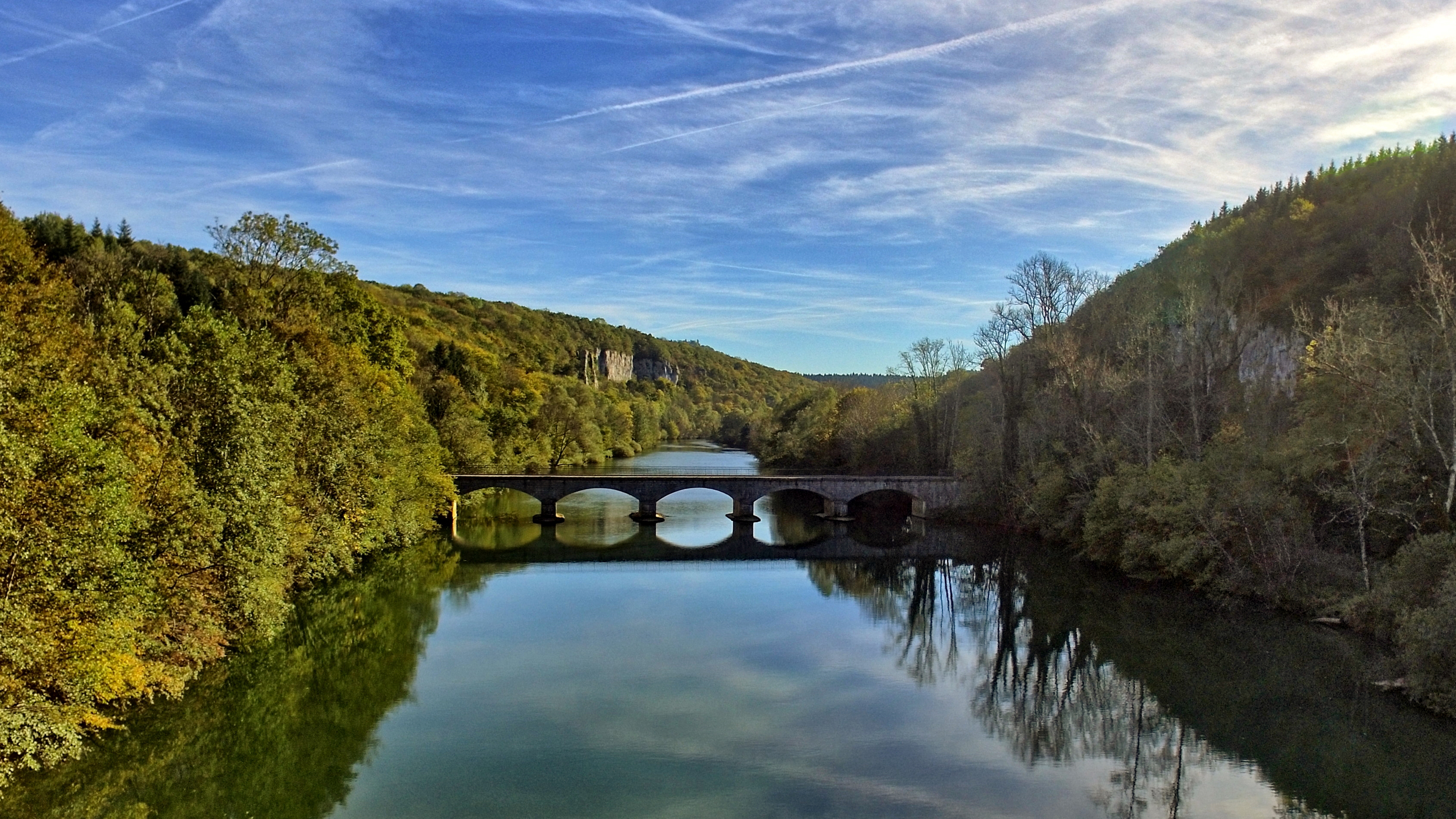
Bridge on the river Loue

== See also ==
- Communes of the Doubs department
