= Bartherans =

- Commune
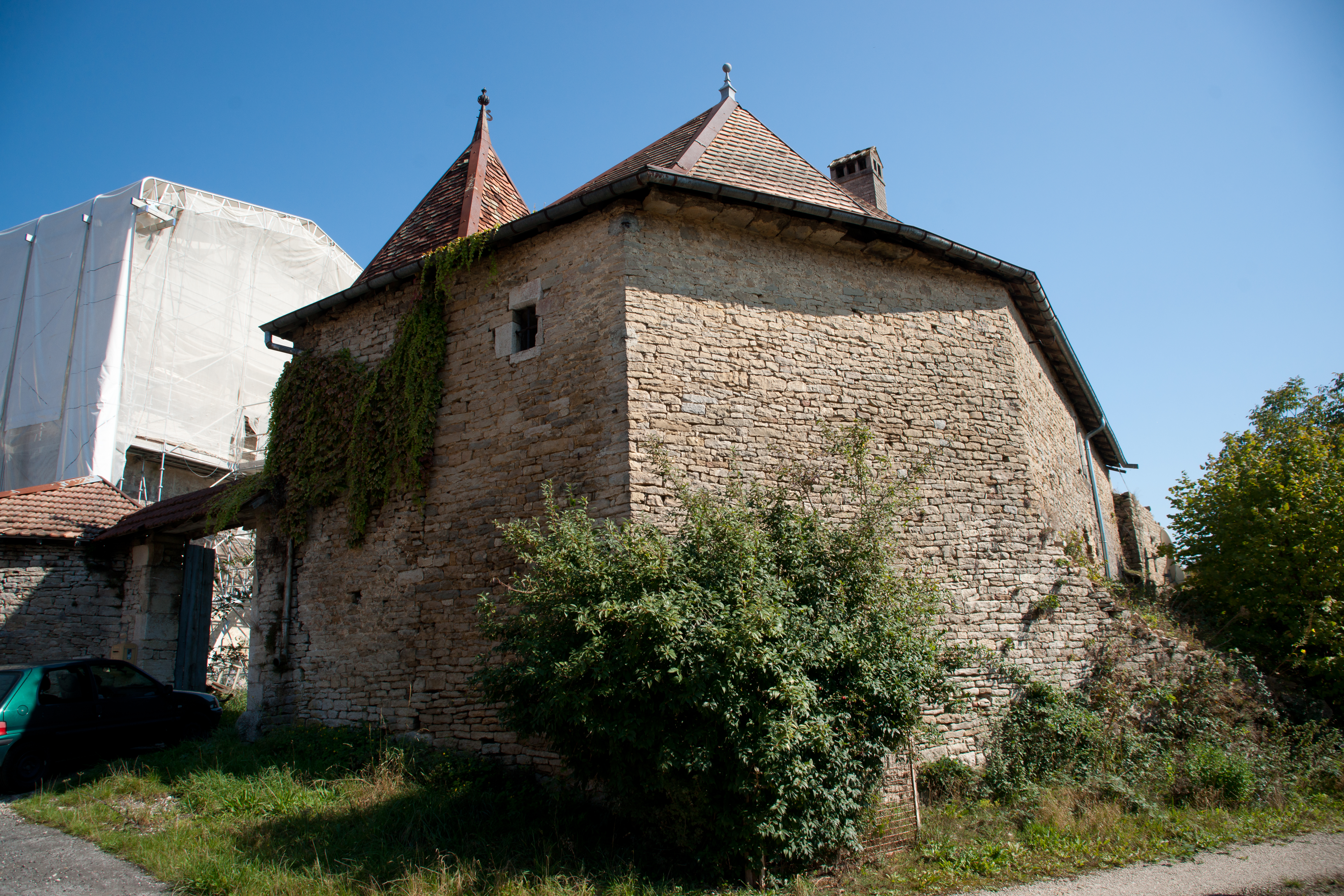
- The church in Bartherans
- Location of Bartherans
- Location within France Location within Bourgogne-Franche-Comté
- Coordinates: 47°02′33″N 5°55′46″E
- Country: France
- Region: Bourgogne-Franche-Comté
- Department: Doubs
- Arrondissement: Besançon
- Canton: Saint-Vit
- Intercommunality: Loue-Lison

Government
  - Mayor (2020–2026): Yves Mougin
- Area^{1}: 5.81 km^{2} (2.24 sq mi)
- Highest elevation: 570 m (1,870 ft)
- Lowest elevation: 408 m (1,339 ft)
- Population (2023): 60
  - Density: 10/km^{2} (27/sq mi)
- Time zone: UTC+01:00 (CET)
  - Summer (DST): UTC+02:00 (CEST)
- INSEE/Postal code: 25044 /25440
- ^{1} French Land Register data, which excludes lakes, ponds, glaciers > 1 km^{2} (0.386 sq mi or 247 acres) and river estuaries.

Bartherans (French pronunciation: [baʁtəʁɑ̃]) is a commune in the Doubs department in the Bourgogne-Franche-Comté region in eastern France.

== Geography ==
Bartherans is situated at 455 m of altitude approximately 23 km southwest of Besançon in a wooded valley.

Neighbouring communities are Montfort in the north, Échay and Myon in the east, Ivrey in the south, and Ronchaux in the west.

== History ==
Gaspard Grandjean from the village founded a chapel devoted to Saint-Antoine and Hubert in 1586. The ruins of the crypt can still be seen in the cemetery.

== Population ==
Historical population
Year	Pop.	±% p.a.
1968	61	—
1975	41	−5.52%
1982	50	+2.88%
1990	46	−1.04%
1999	52	+1.37%
2007	48	−1.00%
2012	48	+0.00%
2017	55	+2.76%
2023	60	+1.46%
Source: INSEE

== Sights ==
There is a seventeenth-century manor house Mouret de Châtillon which is called le château, although it is not as grand as that name implies.

The 19th-century church boasts a bronze bell.

== See also ==
- Communes of the Doubs department
