= Lison (disambiguation) =

Lison is a commune in the Calvados department, Normandy, France.

Lison may also refer to:

- Lison (river), a river in Franche-Comté, France
- Lison (name), a given name and surname
