= Myon =

Myon may refer to:

- Myon (Locris), a town in ancient Locris, Greece
- Myon, Doubs, a town in France
- Myeon (administrative division), in Korea

== See also ==
- Muon, an elementary particle
