= Myon, Doubs =

Myon
- Commune
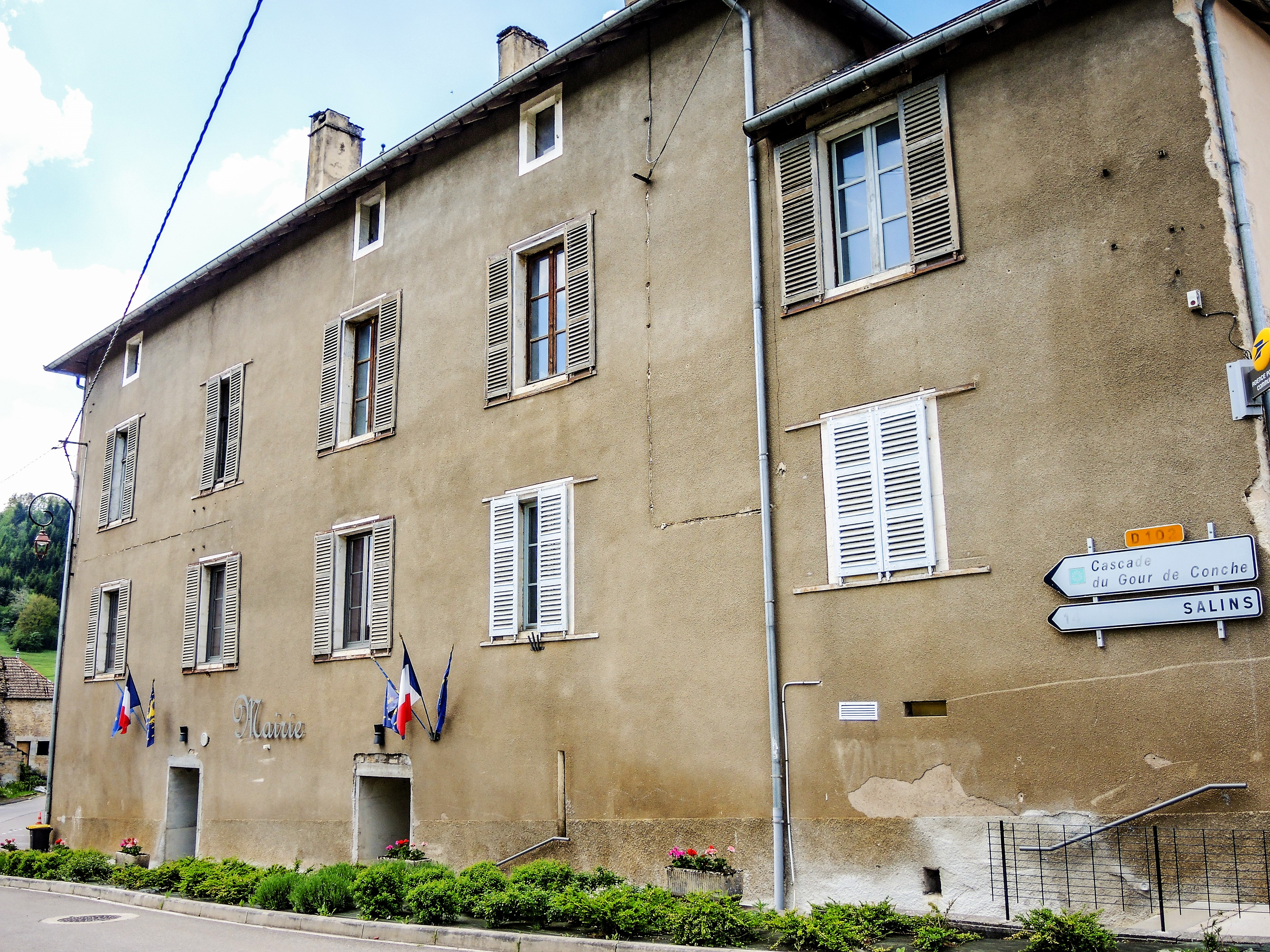
- The town hall in Myon
- Location of Myon
- Location within France Location within Bourgogne-Franche-Comté
- Coordinates: 47°01′32″N 5°56′32″E
- Country: France
- Region: Bourgogne-Franche-Comté
- Department: Doubs
- Arrondissement: Besançon
- Canton: Saint-Vit
- Intercommunality: Loue-Lison

Government
  - Mayor (2020–2026): Sarah Vionnet
- Area^{1}: 16.06 km^{2} (6.20 sq mi)
- Highest elevation: 600 m (2,000 ft)
- Lowest elevation: 309 m (1,014 ft)
- Population (2023): 182
  - Density: 11.3/km^{2} (29.4/sq mi)
- Time zone: UTC+01:00 (CET)
  - Summer (DST): UTC+02:00 (CEST)
- INSEE/Postal code: 25416 /25440
- ^{1} French Land Register data, which excludes lakes, ponds, glaciers > 1 km^{2} (0.386 sq mi or 247 acres) and river estuaries.

Myon (French pronunciation: [mjɔ̃]) is a commune in the Doubs department in the Bourgogne-Franche-Comté region in eastern France.

== Geography ==
Myon lies 15 km (9.3 mi) southeast of Quingey and 13 km (8.1 mi) northeast of Salins-les-Bains in the department of Jura.

== Population ==
Historical population
Year	Pop.	±% p.a.
1968	208	—
1975	168	−3.00%
1982	155	−1.14%
1990	183	+2.10%
1999	201	+1.05%
2007	188	−0.83%
2012	194	+0.63%
2017	183	−1.16%
2023	182	−0.09%
Source: INSEE

== See also ==
- Communes of the Doubs department
