= Nans-sous-Sainte-Anne =

- Commune
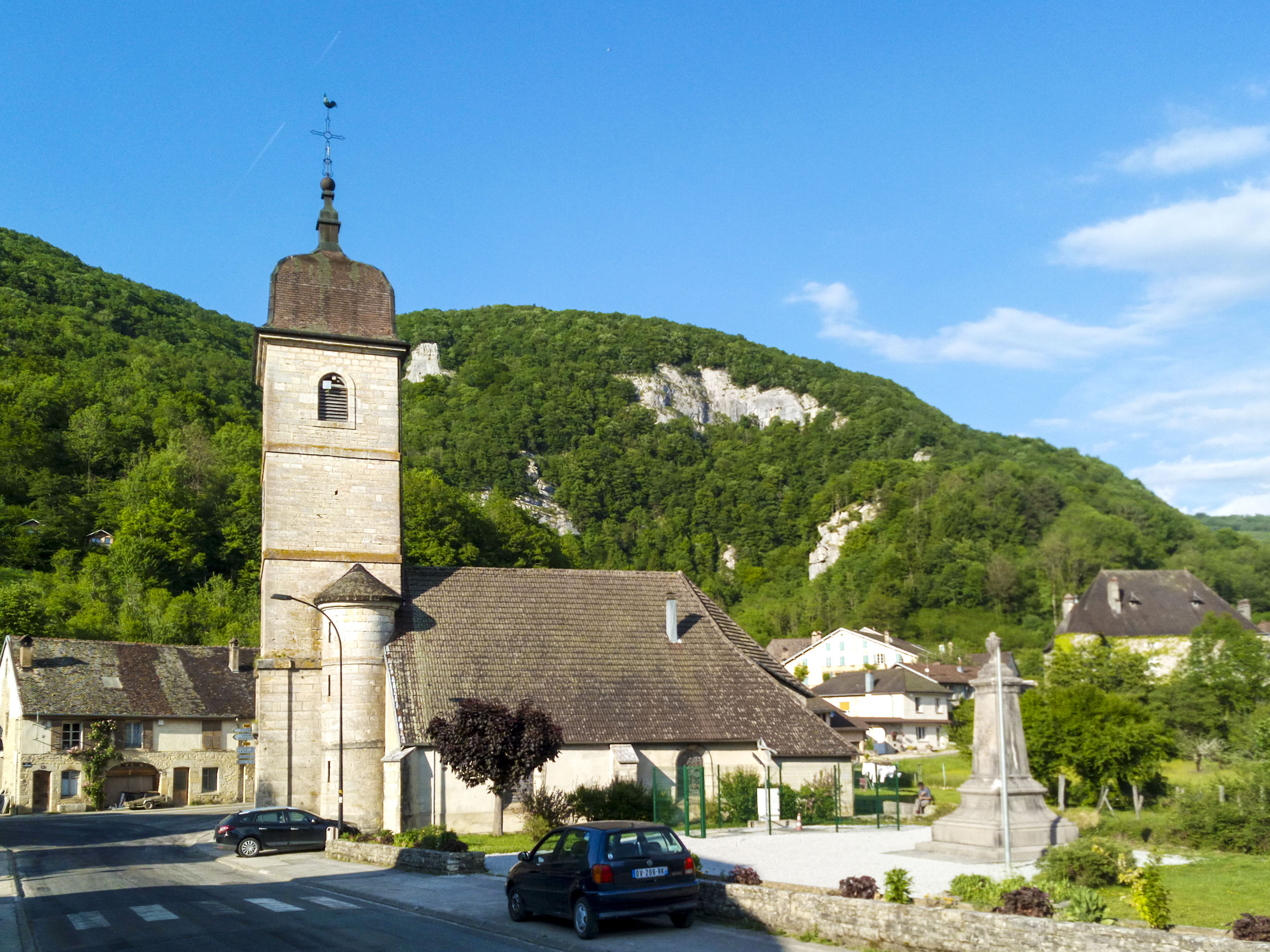
- Center of the village
- Location of Nans-sous-Sainte-Anne
- Location within France Location within Bourgogne-Franche-Comté
- Coordinates: 46°58′39″N 5°59′59″E
- Country: France
- Region: Bourgogne-Franche-Comté
- Department: Doubs
- Arrondissement: Besançon
- Canton: Ornans
- Intercommunality: Loue-Lison

Government
  - Mayor (2020–2026): Emmanuel Cretin
- Area^{1}: 8.86 km^{2} (3.42 sq mi)
- Highest elevation: 770 m (2,530 ft)
- Lowest elevation: 357 m (1,171 ft)
- Population (2023): 167
  - Density: 18.8/km^{2} (48.8/sq mi)
- Time zone: UTC+01:00 (CET)
  - Summer (DST): UTC+02:00 (CEST)
- INSEE/Postal code: 25420 /25330
- ^{1} French Land Register data, which excludes lakes, ponds, glaciers > 1 km^{2} (0.386 sq mi or 247 acres) and river estuaries.

Nans-sous-Sainte-Anne (French pronunciation: [nɑ̃ su sɛ̃t an], literally Nans under Sainte-Anne) is a commune in the Doubs department in the Bourgogne-Franche-Comté region in eastern France.

== Geography ==
The commune lies 44 km (27 mi) south of Besançon on the central plateau of the Jura Mountains. Nans is known for its spectacular geological features, including the Source de Lison, the Via Ferrata and the Grotte Serazin. The artist Gustave Courbet was active in the area. His depiction of the Grotte Serazin hangs in the Getty Museum in Los Angeles, California, and his painting of the Source de Lison is in the Alte Nationalegalerie in Berlin. Nans is also home to the historical Tillandiarie, a 16th-century water-powered workshop.

== Population ==
Historical population
Year	Pop.	±% p.a.
1968	113	—
1975	128	+1.80%
1982	141	+1.39%
1990	142	+0.09%
1999	125	−1.41%
2007	143	+1.70%
2012	146	+0.42%
2017	156	+1.33%
2023	167	+1.14%
Source: INSEE

== See also ==
- Communes of the Doubs department
