= Ronchaux =

- Commune
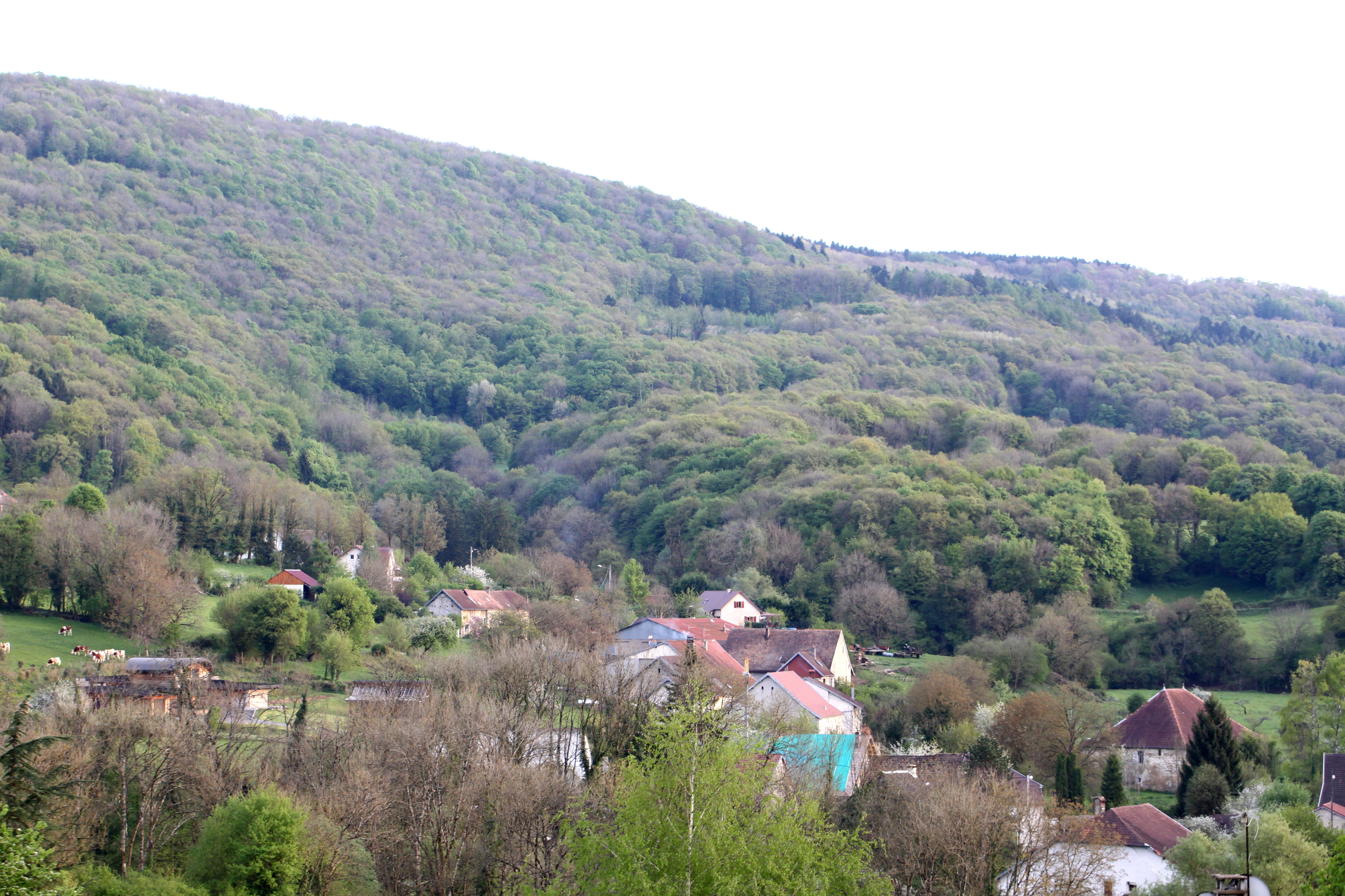
- A general view of Ronchaux
- Location of Ronchaux
- Location within France Location within Bourgogne-Franche-Comté
- Coordinates: 47°03′11″N 5°53′58″E
- Country: France
- Region: Bourgogne-Franche-Comté
- Department: Doubs
- Arrondissement: Besançon
- Canton: Saint-Vit
- Intercommunality: Loue-Lison

Government
  - Mayor (2020–2026): Sylvie Lheritier
- Area^{1}: 5.24 km^{2} (2.02 sq mi)
- Highest elevation: 593 m (1,946 ft)
- Lowest elevation: 283 m (928 ft)
- Population (2023): 103
  - Density: 19.7/km^{2} (50.9/sq mi)
- Time zone: UTC+01:00 (CET)
  - Summer (DST): UTC+02:00 (CEST)
- INSEE/Postal code: 25500 /25440
- ^{1} French Land Register data, which excludes lakes, ponds, glaciers > 1 km^{2} (0.386 sq mi or 247 acres) and river estuaries.

Ronchaux (French pronunciation: [ʁɔ̃ʃo]) is a commune in the Doubs department in the Bourgogne-Franche-Comté region in eastern France.

== Geography ==
Ronchaux lies 6 km (3.7 mi) from Quingey on the banks of the Bief de Caille, a stream that issues from the Mittonière cave.

== Population ==
Historical population
Year	Pop.	±% p.a.
1968	69	—
1975	60	−1.98%
1982	57	−0.73%
1990	62	+1.06%
1999	74	+1.99%
2007	85	+1.75%
2012	90	+1.15%
2017	87	−0.68%
2023	103	+2.85%
Source: INSEE

== See also ==
- Communes of the Doubs department
