= Lison (river) =

River in Franche-Comté, France

Coordinates: 47°04′20″N 5°59′14″E

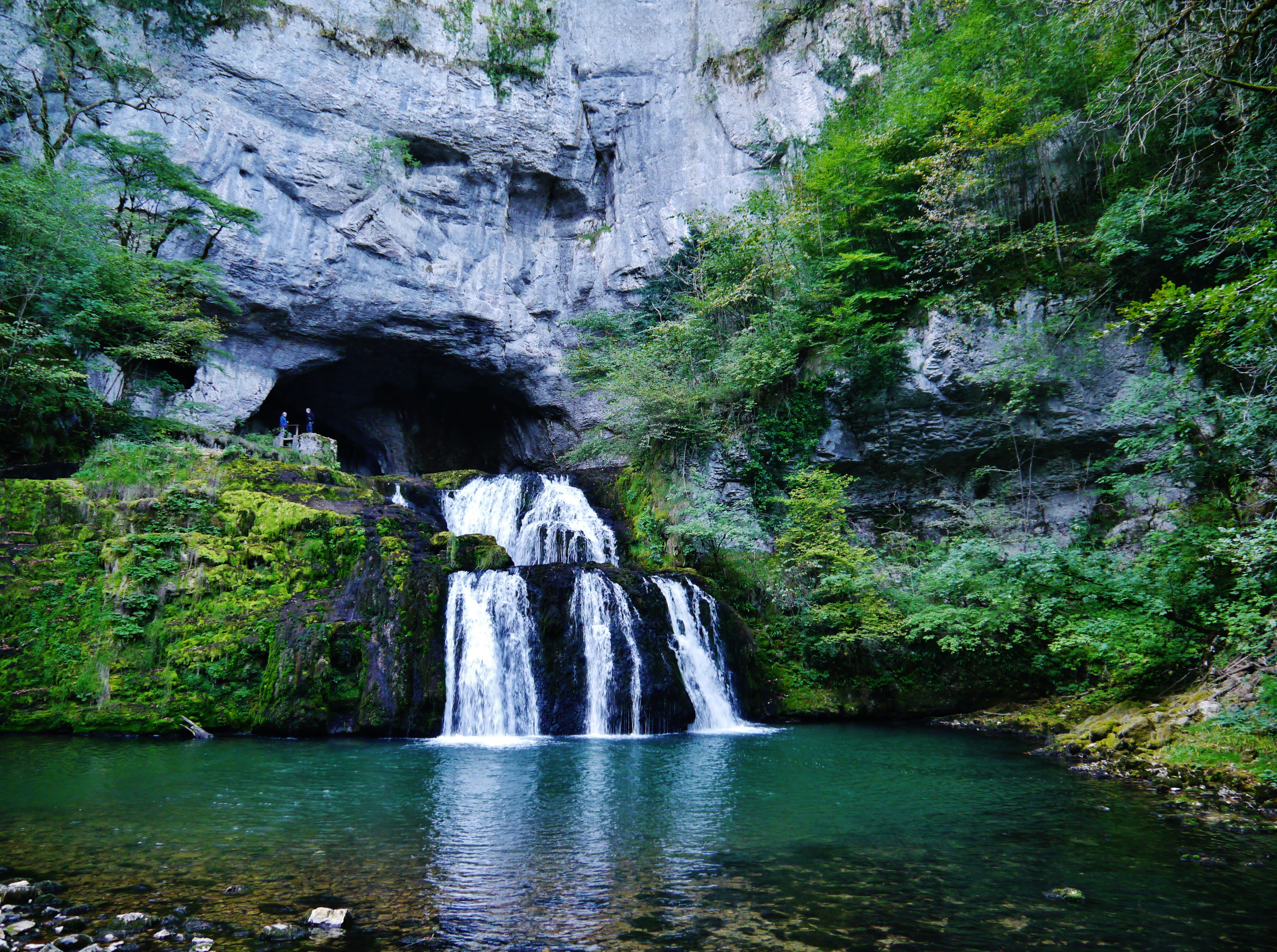
Source of the Lison

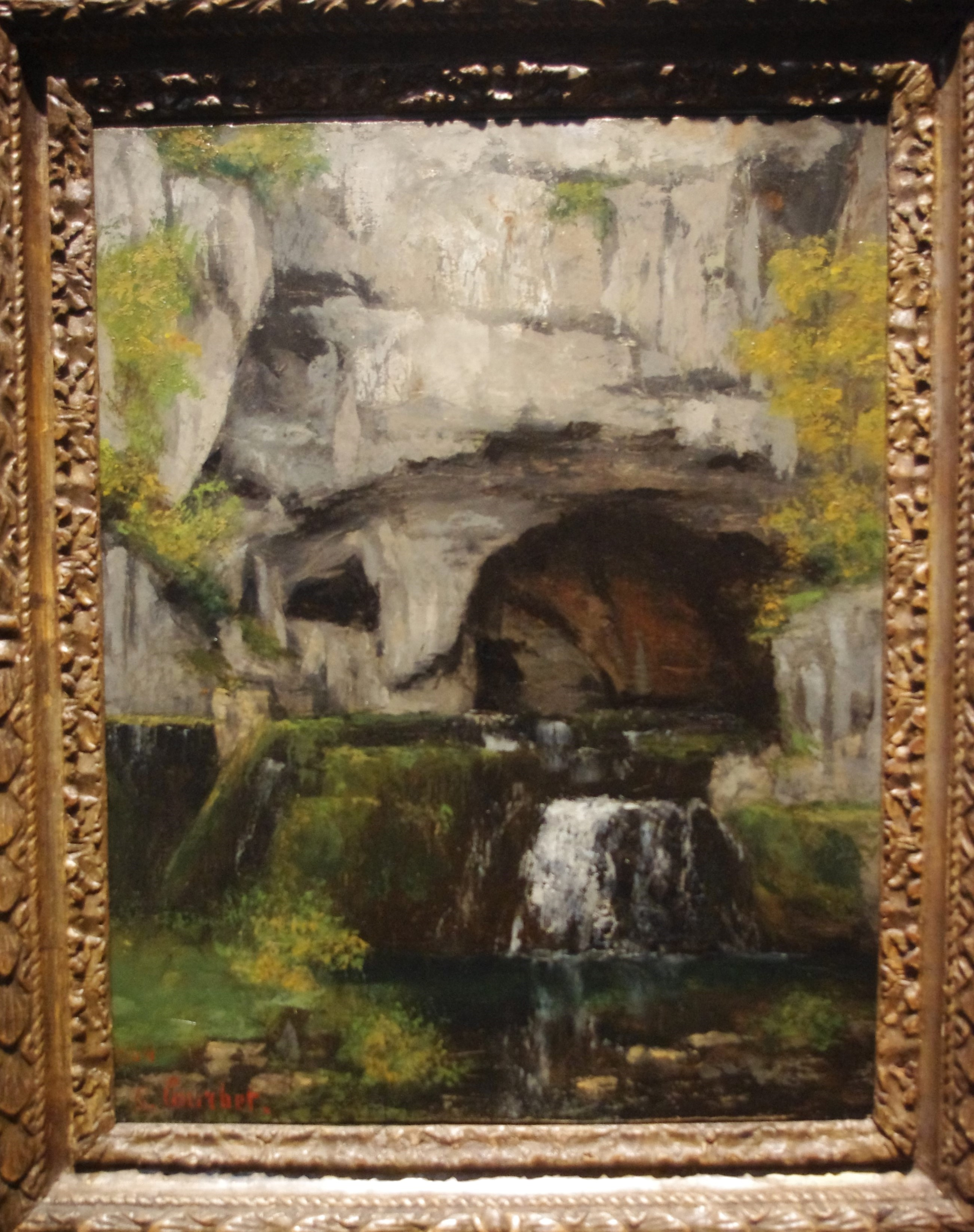
Lison's spring by Gustave Courbet.

The Lison (French pronunciation: [lizɔ̃]) is a river in Franche-Comté in France, in the Department of Doubs. It rises near Nans-sous-Sainte-Anne and flows past Cussey-sur-Lison and Échay, emptying into the Loue.

The river's source, a waterfall emanating from a cave, is a popular tourist attraction that was threatened by industrialization in the late nineteenth-century, and its protection spurred the development of the French conservation movement. The Source of the Lison is the title and subject of several paintings by Gustave Courbet, at least one of which was painted at the site.
