= Pointvillers =

- Part of Le Val
- Location of Pointvillers
- Location within France Location within Bourgogne-Franche-Comté
- Coordinates: 47°03′49″N 5°54′08″E
- Country: France
- Region: Bourgogne-Franche-Comté
- Department: Doubs
- Arrondissement: Besançon
- Canton: Saint-Vit
- Commune: Le Val
- Area^{1}: 3.81 km^{2} (1.47 sq mi)
- Highest elevation: 564 m (1,850 ft)
- Lowest elevation: 280 m (920 ft)
- Population (2014): 144
  - Density: 37.8/km^{2} (97.9/sq mi)
- Time zone: UTC+01:00 (CET)
  - Summer (DST): UTC+02:00 (CEST)
- Postal code: 25440
- ^{1} French Land Register data, which excludes lakes, ponds, glaciers > 1 km^{2} (0.386 sq mi or 247 acres) and river estuaries.

Pointvillers (French pronunciation: [pwɛ̃vilɛʁ]) is a former commune in the Doubs department in the Bourgogne-Franche-Comté region in eastern France. On 1 January 2017, it was merged into the new commune Le Val.

== See also ==
- Communes of the Doubs department
