= Châtillon-sur-Lison =

- Part of Cussey-sur-Lison
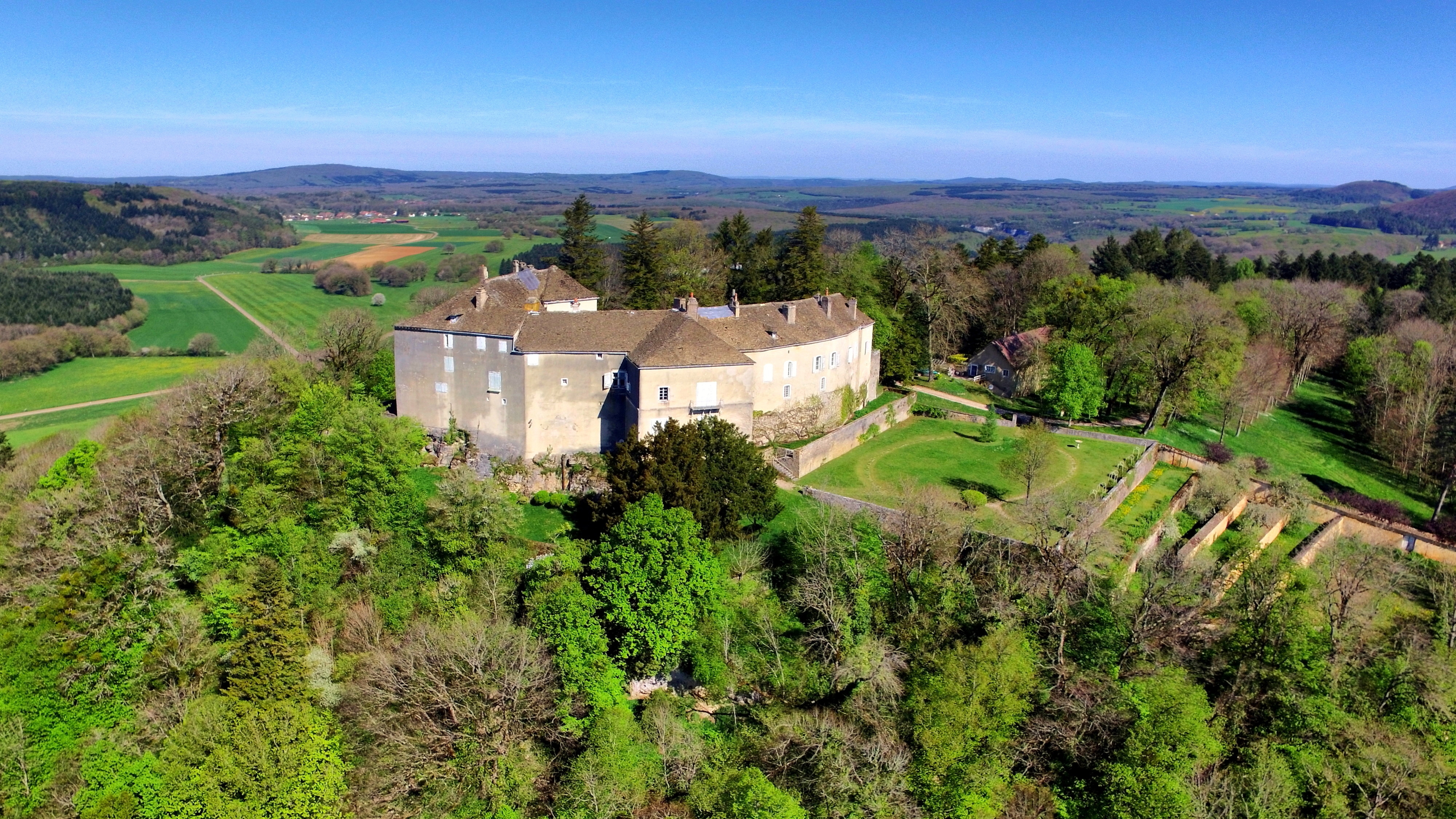
- The chateau in Châtillon-sur-Lison
- Location of Châtillon-sur-Lison
- Location within France Location within Bourgogne-Franche-Comté
- Coordinates: 47°05′20″N 5°59′07″E
- Country: France
- Region: Bourgogne-Franche-Comté
- Department: Doubs
- Arrondissement: Besançon
- Canton: Saint-Vit
- Commune: Cussey-sur-Lison
- Area^{1}: 2.89 km^{2} (1.12 sq mi)
- Highest elevation: 463 m (1,519 ft)
- Lowest elevation: 285 m (935 ft)
- Population (2019): 8
  - Density: 2.8/km^{2} (7.2/sq mi)
- Time zone: UTC+01:00 (CET)
  - Summer (DST): UTC+02:00 (CEST)
- Postal code: 25440
- ^{1} French Land Register data, which excludes lakes, ponds, glaciers > 1 km^{2} (0.386 sq mi or 247 acres) and river estuaries.

Châtillon-sur-Lison (French pronunciation: [ʃatijɔ̃ syʁ lizɔ̃]) is a commune in the Doubs department in the Bourgogne-Franche-Comté region in eastern France. On 1 January 2022 it was absorbed into the commune of Cussey-sur-Lison.

== Population ==
Historical population
Year	Pop.	±% p.a.
2006	15	—
2011	11	−6.01%
2015	9	−4.89%
2019	8	−2.90%
Source: INSEE

== See also ==
- Communes of the Doubs department
