= Le Val, Doubs =

Le Val
- Commune
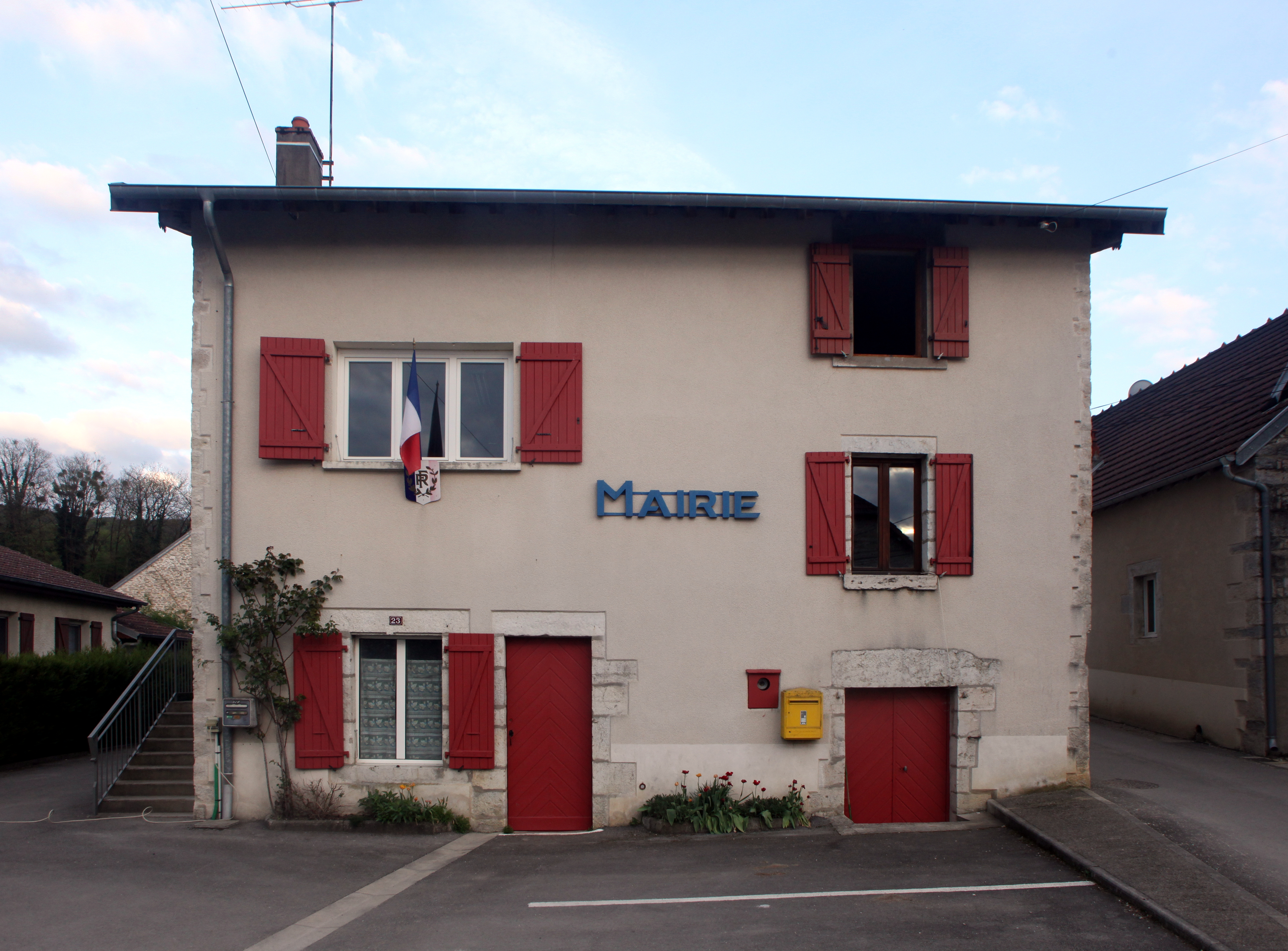
- The town hall in Le Val
- Location of Le Val
- Location within France Location within Bourgogne-Franche-Comté
- Coordinates: 47°03′50″N 5°54′07″E
- Country: France
- Region: Bourgogne-Franche-Comté
- Department: Doubs
- Arrondissement: Besançon
- Canton: Saint-Vit

Government
  - Mayor (2020–2026): Claude Chatelain
- Area^{1}: 6.61 km^{2} (2.55 sq mi)
- Population (2023): 251
  - Density: 38.0/km^{2} (98.3/sq mi)
- Time zone: UTC+01:00 (CET)
  - Summer (DST): UTC+02:00 (CEST)
- INSEE/Postal code: 25460 /25440
- ^{1} French Land Register data, which excludes lakes, ponds, glaciers > 1 km^{2} (0.386 sq mi or 247 acres) and river estuaries.

Le Val (French pronunciation: [lə val]) is a commune in the department of Doubs, eastern France. The municipality was established on 1 January 2017 by merger of the former communes of Pointvillers (the seat) and Montfort.

== See also ==
- Communes of the Doubs department
