= Charles Galibert =

French composer (1826–1858)

Pierre Charles Christophe Galibert (8 August 1826 – 7 August 1858) was a French composer.

== Life ==
A native of Salins-les-Bains in the Jura, Galibert joined the Conservatoire de Paris in March 1845, where he would later have Camille Saint-Saëns as his classmate.

In 1851, his cantata Le Prisonnier earned him the first second prize of the Prix de Rome in musical composition, which he finally won as a laureate in 1853, with another cantata Les Rochers d'Appenzell, on a text by Édouard Monnais.

He stayed at the Villa Médicis from February 1854 to December 1855 and returned to Paris in 1857. He then composed Après l'orage, an opera written on a poem by Henry Boisseaux, which was a huge success at the Théâtre des Bouffes-Parisiens. The critics greeted Charles Galibert as a very promising talent, as already a few months before, when he conducted the orchestra of the inauguration of the spa of Salins-les-Bains.

Galibert's died on the eve of his 32nd birthday.

== Works ==
- Le Prisonnier
- Les Rochers d'Appenzell
- Après l'Orage
