= Mont Poupet =

Mountain in France

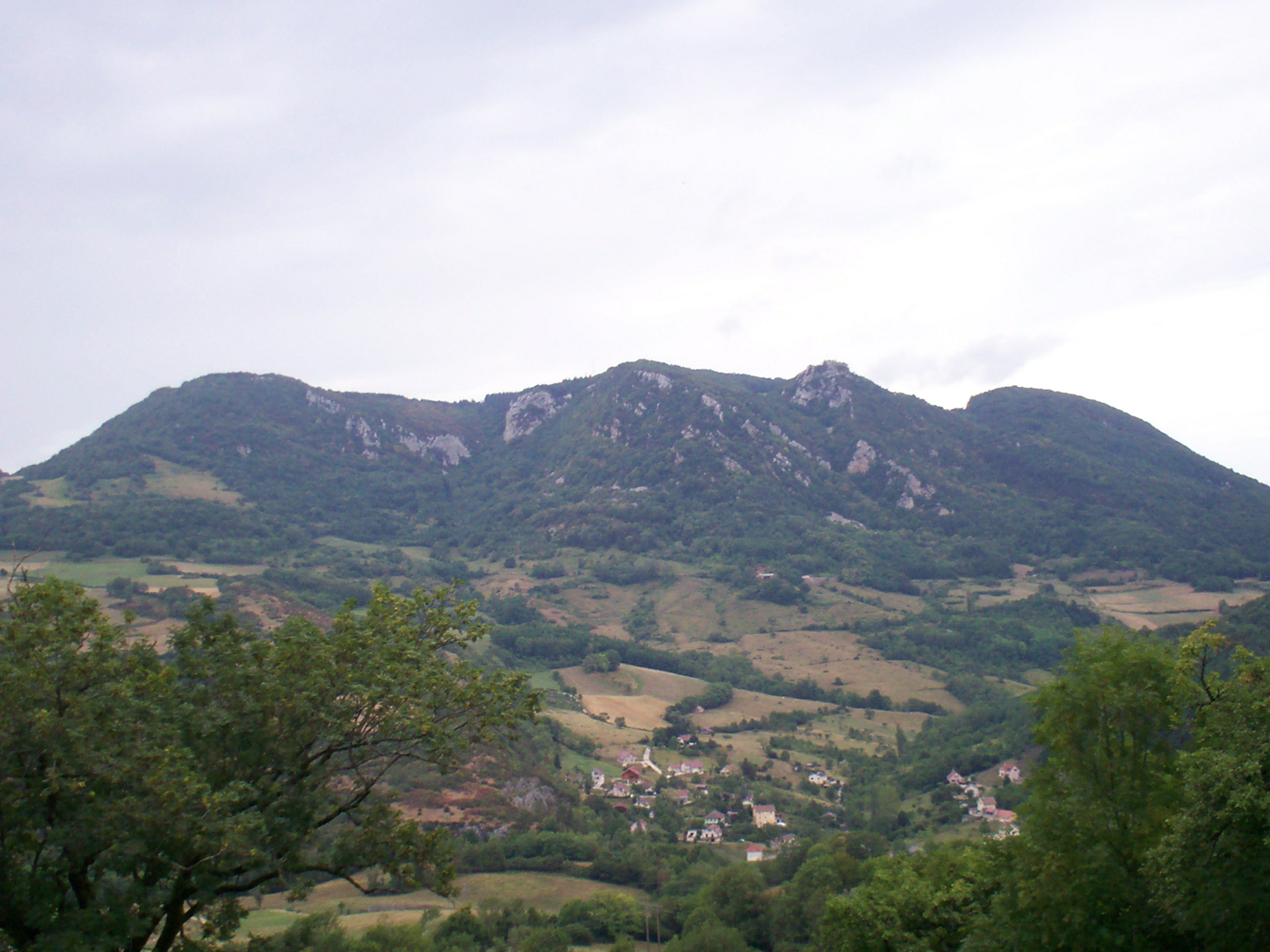

Highest point
- Elevation: 851 m (2,792 ft)
- Coordinates: 46°58′20″N 5°53′13″E

Geography
- Location within France
- Location: Jura, France
- Parent range: Jura Mountains

Mont Poupet is a mountain in the Jura Mountains, Bourgogne-Franche-Comté, eastern France. With an elevation of 851 metres (2,792 ft), it is located in the commune of Saint-Thiébaud. From up there you can look down over the whole valley of Salins-les-Bains.

The mountain is mostly composed of limestone.
