= Montfort, Doubs =

Montfort
- Part of Le Val
- Location of Montfort
- Location within France Location within Bourgogne-Franche-Comté
- Coordinates: 47°03′32″N 5°54′06″E
- Country: France
- Region: Bourgogne-Franche-Comté
- Department: Doubs
- Arrondissement: Besançon
- Canton: Saint-Vit
- Commune: Le Val
- Area^{1}: 2.8 km^{2} (1.1 sq mi)
- Highest elevation: 531 m (1,742 ft)
- Lowest elevation: 269 m (883 ft)
- Population (2014): 95
  - Density: 34/km^{2} (88/sq mi)
- Time zone: UTC+01:00 (CET)
  - Summer (DST): UTC+02:00 (CEST)
- Postal code: 25440
- ^{1} French Land Register data, which excludes lakes, ponds, glaciers > 1 km^{2} (0.386 sq mi or 247 acres) and river estuaries.

Montfort (French pronunciation: [mɔ̃fɔʁ]) is a former commune in the Doubs department in the Bourgogne-Franche-Comté region in eastern France. On 1 January 2017, it was merged into the new commune Le Val.

== Geography ==
Montfort lies 6 km (3.7 mi) south of Quingey.

== See also ==
- Communes of the Doubs department
