= Lison (name) =

Lison (English and French), Lisoń (Polish, from the word lis, 'fox'), Lisoň (Slovak) is a surname. Lison is also a given name. Notable people with the name include:

Given name

- Lison Nowaczyk (born 2003), French swimmer

Surname

- Barbara Lison (born 1956), German librarian
- Lucien Lison (1908–1984), Belgian/Brazilian physician and biomedical scientist
- Marek Lisoň (born 1990), Slovak ice hockey player
