= Salins-les-Bains =

- Commune
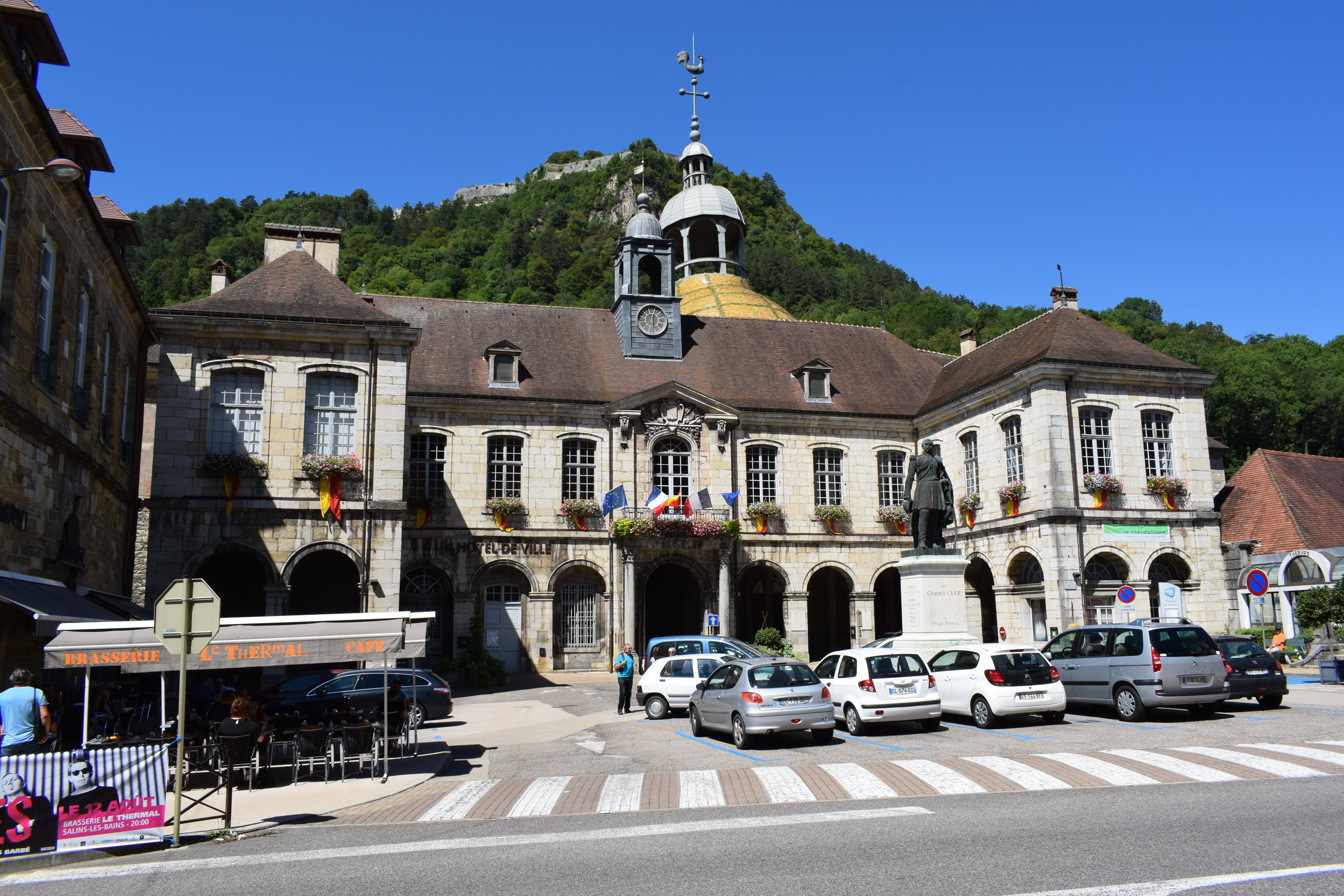
- Salins-les-Bains Town Hall

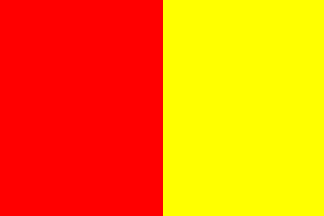
- Flag Coat of arms
- Location of Salins-les-Bains
- Location within France Location within Bourgogne-Franche-Comté
- Coordinates: 46°56′31″N 5°52′45″E
- Country: France
- Region: Bourgogne-Franche-Comté
- Department: Jura
- Arrondissement: Dole
- Canton: Arbois
- Intercommunality: CC Arbois, Poligny, Salins – Cœur du Jura

Government
  - Mayor (2020–2026): Michel Cêtre
- Area^{1}: 24.68 km^{2} (9.53 sq mi)
- Elevation: 350 m (1,150 ft)
- Highest elevation: 737 m (2,418 ft)
- Lowest elevation: 284 m (932 ft)
- Population (2023): 2,390
  - Density: 96.8/km^{2} (251/sq mi)
- Time zone: UTC+01:00 (CET)
  - Summer (DST): UTC+02:00 (CEST)
- INSEE/Postal code: 39500 /39110
- ^{1} French Land Register data, which excludes lakes, ponds, glaciers > 1 km^{2} (0.386 sq mi or 247 acres) and river estuaries.

Salins-les-Bains (French pronunciation: [salɛ̃ le bɛ̃]; Arpitan: Sôlin), commonly referred to simply as Salins, is a commune in the Jura department in the Bourgogne-Franche-Comté region in Eastern France. It is located on the departmental border with Doubs, 34.8 km (21.6 mi) to the south-southwest of Besançon.

The town owes its name to its saline waters which shaped its history for centuries; they continue to attract visitors today, for the town's bedrock contains salt and gypsum deposits. In 2009 the historic saltworks were added to the list of UNESCO World Heritage Sites as an addition to the Royal Saltworks at Arc-et-Senans site, which was inscribed in 1982.

== Geography ==
Salins is situated in the narrow Valley of the Furieuse, between two fortified hills, Fort Belin and Fort Saint-André, while to the north rises Mont Poupet (851 m or 2,791 ft).

== History ==
Salins was an important city in Celtic times and became a Roman oppidum known as Salinae Sequanorum.

The territory of Salins, which was enfeoffed in the 10th century by the Abbey of Saint Maurice-en-Valais to the counts of Mâcon, remained in possession of their descendants till 1175. Maurette de Salins (1137-1200), heiress of this dynasty, brought the lordship to the house of Vienne, and her granddaughter sold it in 1225 to Duke Hugh IV of Burgundy, who ceded it in 1237 to John, Count of Chalon in exchange for the county of Chalon. John's heirs - counts and dukes of Burgundy, emperors and kings of the House of Austria - bore the title of sire de Salins (Lord of Salins).

In 1477 Salins was taken by the French and temporarily made the seat of the parlement of Franche-Comté by King Louis XI of France. The French re-took the town in 1668 and in 1674, and thenceforward it remained in their power. In 1825 the town was almost destroyed by fire. In 1871, it successfully resisted German troops in the Franco-Prussian War.

French composer Charles Galibert (1826–1858) was born in Salins-les-Bains.

Until the early-20th century, the slopes surrounding the town were largely covered in vines, which were however almost entirely abandoned after the phylloxera crisis of the mid-19th century decimated the vineyards. Little trace of this former activity remains today.

For much of the 20th century, the town was also famed for its potters, but today only three craftsmen continue to uphold this local tradition.

== Great Saltworks ==
Great Saltworks of Salins-les-Bains
UNESCO World Heritage Site
- Interactive map of Great Saltworks of Salins-les-Bains
- Part of: From the Great Saltworks of Salins-les-Bains to the Royal Saltworks of Arc-et-Senans, the Production of Open-pan Salt
- Criteria: Cultural: i, ii, iv
- Reference: [https://whc.unesco.org/en/list/203bis-002 203bis-002 203bis-002]
- Inscription: 1982 (6th Session)
- Extensions: 2009

The extraction of salt at Salins-les-Bains began during the Middle Ages at the latest. As early as 1115, there were two saltworks located at wells around the town, and because of the salt production, Salins-les-Bains was the largest town in Franche-Comté after Besançon in medieval times. Deforestation in the region during the 17th and 18th centuries led to the creation of the Royal Saltworks at Arc-et-Senans, at a more favorable location near a large forest. However, the brine extracted from Salins would still be used, being channeled to the Royal Saltworks, 21 km away, for processing. In 1962, the Great Saltworks of Salins-les-Bains ceased all production.

== Demographics ==
Historical population

| Year | Pop. | ±% p.a. |
|---|---|---|
| 1793 | 8,174 | — |
| 1800 | 8,125 | −0.09% |
| 1806 | 8,374 | +0.50% |
| 1821 | 7,271 | −0.94% |
| 1831 | 6,554 | −1.03% |
| 1836 | 6,700 | +0.44% |
| 1841 | 7,481 | +2.23% |
| 1846 | 7,178 | −0.82% |
| 1851 | 7,112 | −0.18% |
| 1856 | 6,470 | −1.87% |
| 1861 | 7,361 | +2.61% |
| 1866 | 6,308 | −3.04% |
| 1872 | 6,045 | −0.71% |
| 1876 | 6,271 | +0.92% |
| 1881 | 6,419 | +0.47% |
| 1886 | 5,833 | −1.90% |
| 1891 | 6,068 | +0.79% |
| 1896 | 5,607 | −1.57% |
| 1901 | 5,525 | −0.29% |

| Year | Pop. | ±% p.a. |
|---|---|---|
| 1906 | 5,290 | −0.87% |
| 1911 | 5,272 | −0.07% |
| 1921 | 4,471 | −1.63% |
| 1926 | 4,721 | +1.09% |
| 1931 | 4,607 | −0.49% |
| 1936 | 4,563 | −0.19% |
| 1946 | 4,363 | −0.45% |
| 1954 | 4,930 | +1.54% |
| 1962 | 4,451 | −1.27% |
| 1968 | 4,259 | −0.73% |
| 1975 | 4,177 | −0.28% |
| 1982 | 3,923 | −0.89% |
| 1990 | 3,629 | −0.97% |
| 1999 | 3,333 | −0.94% |
| 2007 | 3,045 | −1.12% |
| 2012 | 2,801 | −1.66% |
| 2017 | 2,586 | −1.58% |
| 2023 | 2,390 | −1.31% |

Source: EHESS and INSEE (1968-2023)

== Sights ==
The town has a Romanesque church, St-Anatoile, which has been well restored, and a hôtel de ville from the 18th century. A 17th-century Jesuit chapel contains a library, established in 1593, and a museum.

== Transportation ==
Salins-les-Bains is on the Paris to Lausanne (Switzerland) road. The closest railway station is in Mouchard, a few kilometres away.

== Twin towns ==
- Horb am Neckar, Germany, since 1991

== See also ==
- Communes of the Jura department
