= Quingey =

- Commune
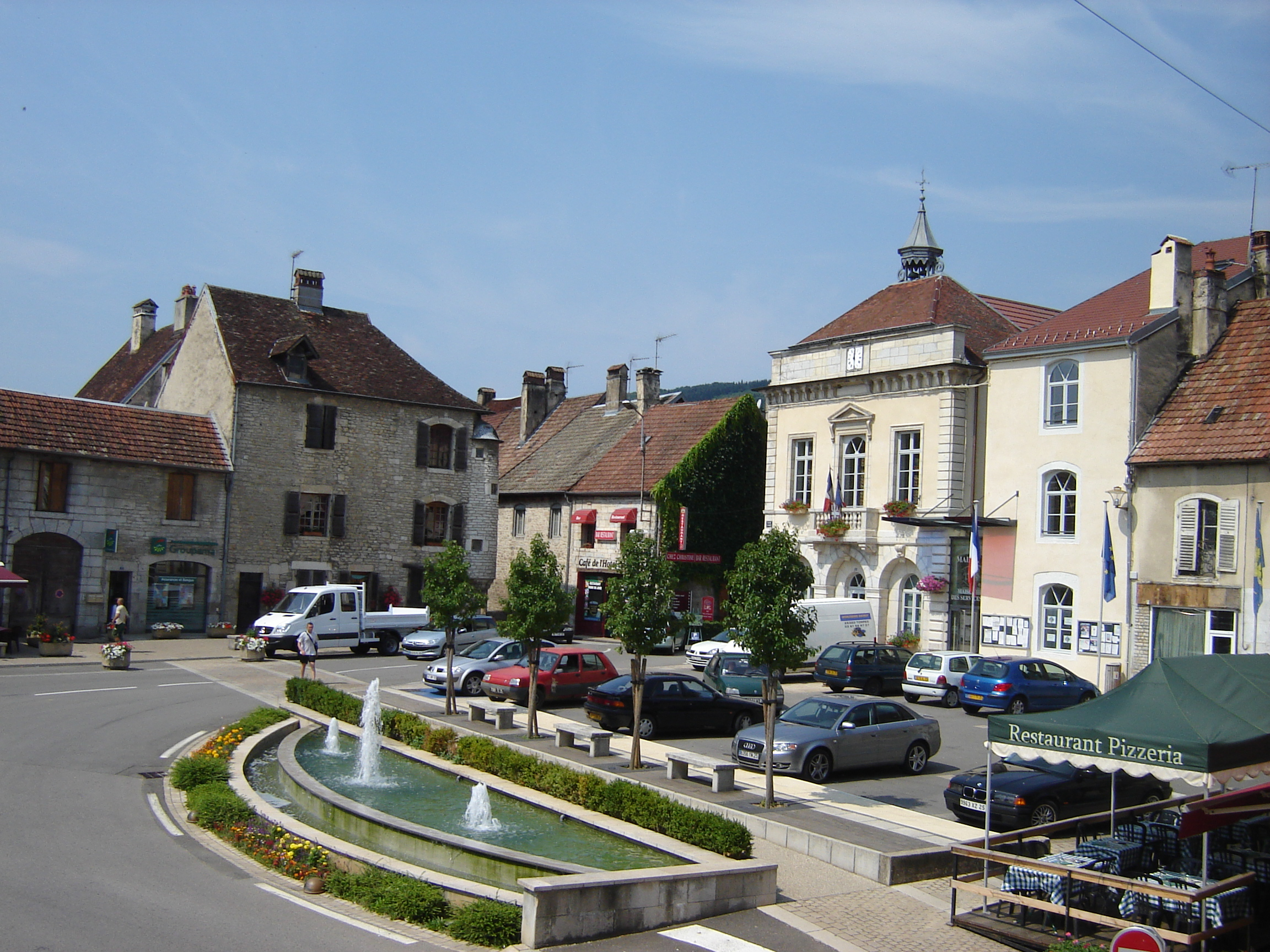
- Town hall

- Coat of arms
- Location of Quingey
- Location within France Location within Bourgogne-Franche-Comté
- Coordinates: 47°06′15″N 5°53′01″E
- Country: France
- Region: Bourgogne-Franche-Comté
- Department: Doubs
- Arrondissement: Besançon
- Canton: Saint-Vit
- Intercommunality: Loue-Lison

Government
  - Mayor (2020–2026): Sarah Faivre
- Area^{1}: 8.55 km^{2} (3.30 sq mi)
- Highest elevation: 522 m (1,713 ft)
- Lowest elevation: 259 m (850 ft)
- Population (2023): 1,299
  - Density: 152/km^{2} (393/sq mi)
- Time zone: UTC+01:00 (CET)
  - Summer (DST): UTC+02:00 (CEST)
- INSEE/Postal code: 25475 /25440
- ^{1} French Land Register data, which excludes lakes, ponds, glaciers > 1 km^{2} (0.386 sq mi or 247 acres) and river estuaries.

Quingey (French pronunciation: [kɛ̃ʒɛ]) is a commune and former canton seat in the Doubs department in the Bourgogne-Franche-Comté region in eastern France.

== Geography ==
Quingey lies 20 km (12 mi) southwest of Besançon and 30 km (19 mi) east of Dole in the department of Jura.

The commune is at the western extremity of the department of Doubs, a dozen km from the department of Jura. The river Loue runs through it. On the north is the valley of the river Doubs, the vast forests of Chaux and the Val d'Amour lie on the west, the mountains of Salins on the south, and the valley of the Lison on the east.

As the Loue traverses this alluvial plain, it is barred by numerous natural dams. The plain is surrounded by peaks between 470 m and 850 (the Mont Poupet).

== History ==
Situated on the Roman road between Lyon and Strasbourg, its history goes back to the third century.

The last vestiges of its fortifications were destroyed in 1823, but the bridge over the Loue dates from 1590. It was slightly rebuilt in 1844.

Pope Calistus II was born in Quingey in c. 1065.

== Population ==
Historical population
Year	Pop.	±% p.a.
1968	854	—
1975	936	+1.32%
1982	920	−0.25%
1990	980	+0.79%
1999	1,049	+0.76%
2007	1,214	+1.84%
2012	1,366	+2.39%
2017	1,430	+0.92%
2023	1,299	−1.59%
Source: INSEE

== See also ==
- Communes of the Doubs department
