= Échay =

- Commune
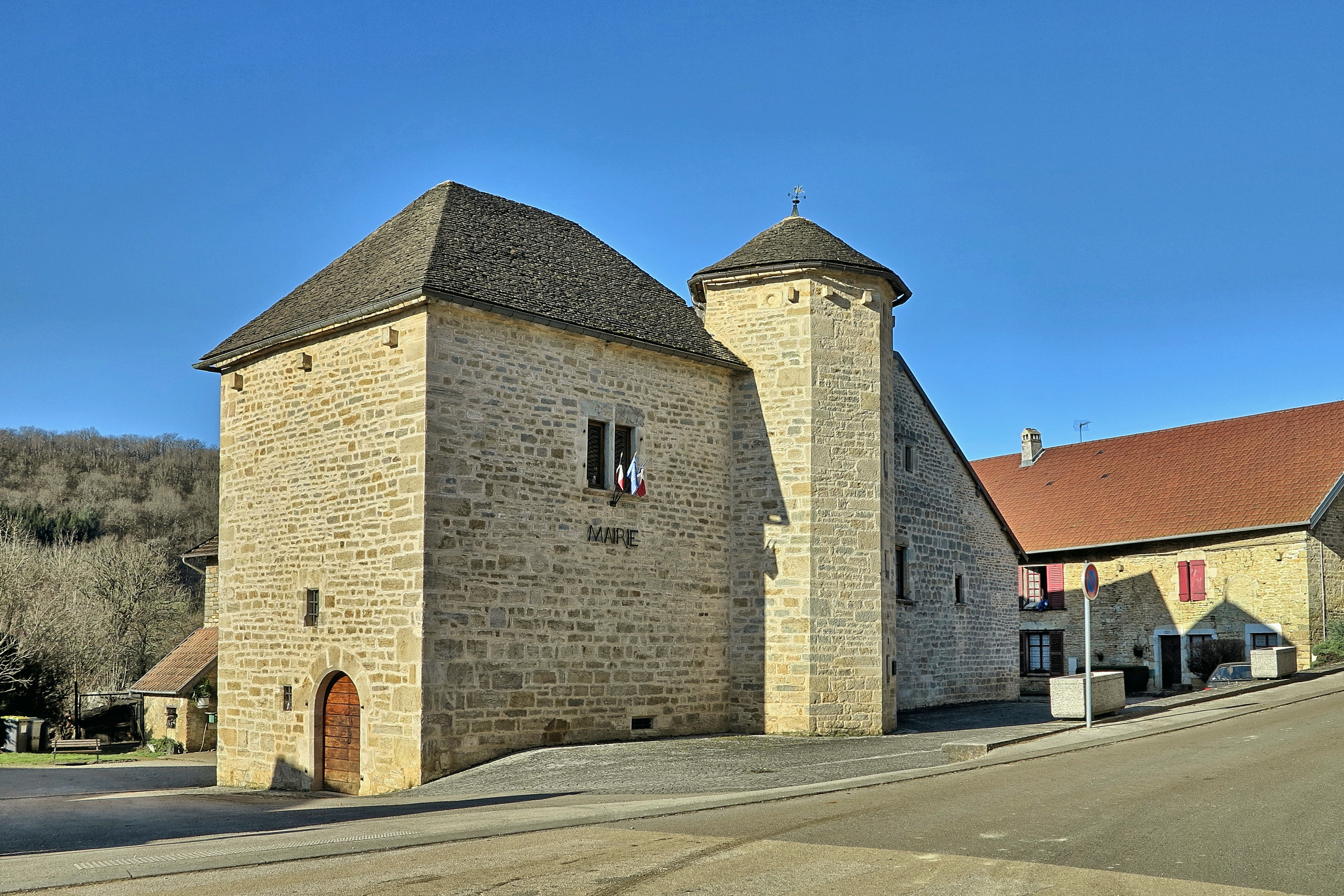
- Renaissance house La Téru
- Location of Échay
- Location within France Location within Bourgogne-Franche-Comté
- Coordinates: 47°02′46″N 5°56′56″E
- Country: France
- Region: Bourgogne-Franche-Comté
- Department: Doubs
- Arrondissement: Besançon
- Canton: Saint-Vit
- Intercommunality: Loue-Lison

Government
  - Mayor (2020–2026): Serge Gallet
- Area^{1}: 5.49 km^{2} (2.12 sq mi)
- Highest elevation: 454 m (1,490 ft)
- Lowest elevation: 301 m (988 ft)
- Population (2023): 113
  - Density: 20.6/km^{2} (53.3/sq mi)
- Time zone: UTC+01:00 (CET)
  - Summer (DST): UTC+02:00 (CEST)
- INSEE/Postal code: 25209 /25440
- ^{1} French Land Register data, which excludes lakes, ponds, glaciers > 1 km^{2} (0.386 sq mi or 247 acres) and river estuaries.

Échay (French pronunciation: [eʃɛ]) is a commune in the Doubs department in the Bourgogne-Franche-Comté region in eastern France.

== Population ==
Historical population
| Year | Pop. | ±% p.a. |
|---|---|---|
| 1968 | 63 | — |
| 1975 | 66 | +0.67% |
| 1982 | 75 | +1.84% |
| 1990 | 76 | +0.17% |
| 1999 | 67 | −1.39% |
| 2007 | 99 | +5.00% |
| 2012 | 123 | +4.44% |
| 2017 | 129 | +0.96% |
| 2023 | 113 | −2.18% |
Source: INSEE

== See also ==
- Communes of the Doubs department
