= Defect of birth (Catholic canon law) =

Nullified restrictions on illegitimacy

Defect of birth was, under former Roman Catholic canon law, a canonical impediment to ordination as a result of illegitimacy. Defect of birth inhibited the exercise of the functions of orders already received. The prohibition did not touch the validity of orders, but made the reception thereof illicit.

The defect of illegitimate birth could be remedied in four ways: (1) by the subsequent marriage of the parents, if they were capable of contracting a marriage at the time of birth; (2) by a rescript of the pope; (3) by religious profession; (4) by a dispensation.

== Current law ==
Under the current 1983 Code of Canon Law, illegitimacy has no canonical implications or consequences.

== See also ==
- Illegitimacy
