= Holy orders in the Catholic Church =

Ordination of clergy in the Roman Catholic Church

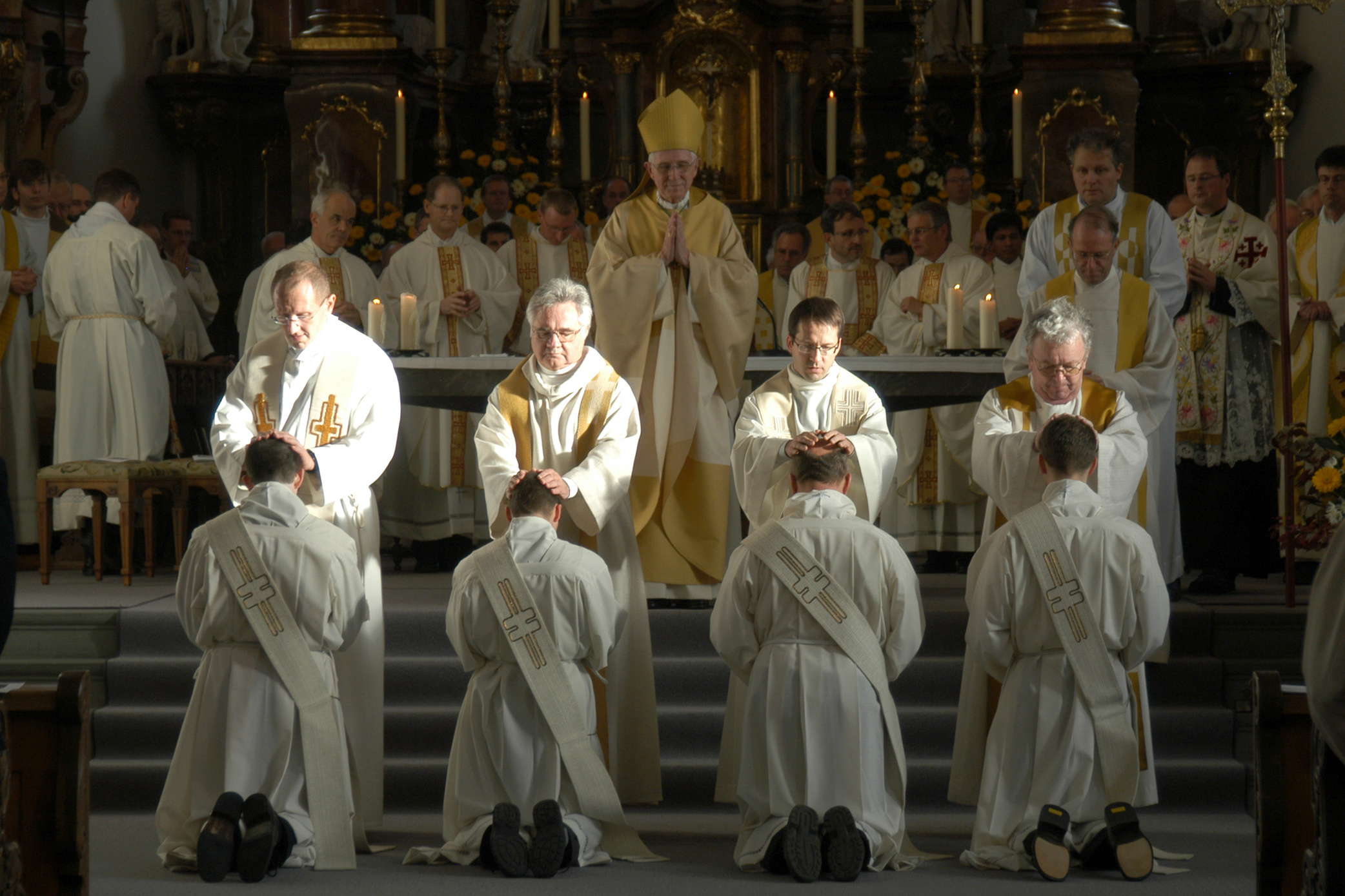
Priests lay their hands on the ordinands at the bestowal of the sacrament of ordination.

The sacrament of holy orders in the Catholic Church includes three orders of men: bishops, priests, and deacons, in decreasing orders of rank, collectively comprising the clergy. In the phrase "holy orders", the word "holy" means "set apart for a sacred purpose". The word "order" designates an established civil body or corporation with a hierarchy, and ordination means legal incorporation into an order. In context, therefore, Holy Orders creates a group with a hierarchical structure that is set apart for ministry in the Church.

Men in the last year of seminary training who are seeking ordination as a priest are typically ordained to the "transitional diaconate", while men who are not seeking priestly ordination are instead ordained to the "permanent diaconate". Deacons, whether transitional or permanent, receive faculties to preach, to perform baptisms, and to witness marriages (either assisting the priest at the Mass, or officiating at a wedding not involving a Mass). They may assist at services where Holy Communion is given, such as the Mass, and they are considered the ordinary dispenser of the Precious Blood (the wine) when Communion is given in both types and a deacon is present, but they may not celebrate the Mass themselves. They may officiate at a funeral service not involving a Mass, including a visitation (wake) or the graveside service at burial. After six months or more as a transitional deacon, a man will be ordained to the priesthood. Priests may preach, perform baptisms, witness marriages, hear confessions and give absolutions, anoint the sick, and celebrate the Eucharist or the Mass. Some priests are later chosen to be bishops, who are the ordinary ministers of confirmation and holy orders; bishops may ordain priests, deacons, and other bishops.

The ordination is always bestowed within Mass, on a Sunday or other holy day of obligation, and usually in the cathedral. In all cases, the faithful are invited to attend, and the ordinary is usually the minister of the sacrament.

Holy orders leave an "indelible" mark on the soul of each man ordained, meaning that ordination is an irreversible act. Thus, no person's orders and abilities as an ordained man can be removed, though their ability to perform actions licitly may be revoked in some cases.

== Bishops ==
Bishops are chosen from among the priests in the Catholic Church. Among Eastern Catholic Churches, which permit married priests, bishops must be widowers or unmarried. Catholic bishops are often ordinaries (leaders) of territorial units called dioceses.

The ordination of bishops through the laying on of hands is a central tenet in Catholicism, as it provides for the apostolic succession required by the church and its teaching of the Nicene Creed. The church believes that each bishop is a "Successor of the Apostles", and is endowed with the same fullness of the Holy Spirit that Jesus gave to the apostles at Pentecost, as seen in John 20:21-23. For this reason, any bishop with apostolic succession can validly ordain any priest as a bishop, though it is only licit if they receive a mandate to do so from the pope. Any bishop who consecrates a bishop without such a mandate is excommunicated latae sententiae (that is, automatically).

Only bishops can administer the sacrament of holy orders. When consecrating another bishop, it is generally required that two other bishops join the consecrating bishop in the ordination. In the Latin Church, usually only bishops may licitly administer the sacrament of confirmation, but if an ordinary priest administers that sacrament illicitly, without an indult (reserved to the Holy See prior to Vatican II, and reserved to the local Ordinary after the New Code of Canon Law was promulgated), it is nonetheless considered valid. In Eastern Catholic Churches, confirmation is done by parish priests via the rite of chrismation, and is usually administered to both babies and adults immediately after their baptism.

== Priests ==
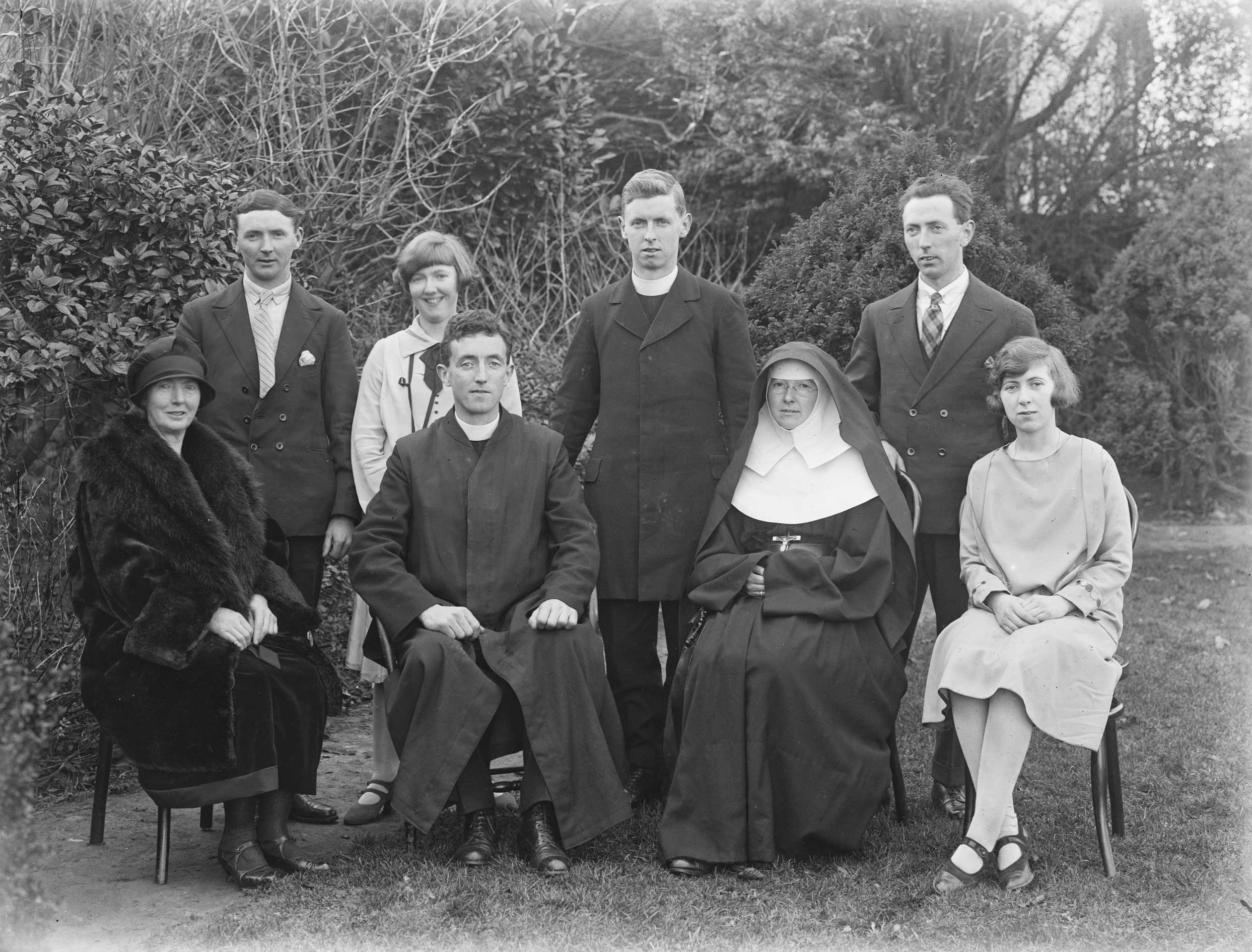
Group photograph of an Irish family marking the ordination of a Fr. Burke in 1926

The word "priest" derives ultimately either from the Greek πρεσβύτερος/presbuteros ("elder") or the Latin praepositus ("superintendent"). The Catholic Church sees the priesthood as both a reflection of the ancient Jewish priesthood in the Temple, and the work of Jesus as priest. The liturgy of ordination recalls the Old Testament priesthood and the priesthood of Christ. In the words of Thomas Aquinas's Summa Theologica, "Christ is the source of all priesthood: the priest of the old law was a prefiguration of Christ, and the priest of the new law acts in the person of Christ." Priests may celebrate Mass, hear confessions and give absolution, celebrate baptism, serve as the Church's witness at the sacrament of holy matrimony, administer anointing of the sick, and administer confirmation if authorized to do so by the bishop. See Presbyterorum Ordinis for the Second Vatican Council decree on the nature of the Catholic priesthood.

=== Rite ===
After being called forward and presented to the assembly, the candidates for ordination are interrogated. Each promises to diligently perform the duties of the priesthood and to respect and obey his ordinary (bishop or religious superior). Then the candidates lie prostrate before the altar, while the assembled faithful kneel and pray for the help of all the saints in the singing of the Litany of the Saints.

The essential part of the rite is when the bishop, followed by all priests present, silently lays his hands upon each candidate, then offers the consecratory prayer, addressed to God the Father, invoking the power of the Holy Spirit upon those being ordained.

After the consecratory prayer, the newly ordained is vested with the stole and chasuble of the Ministerial Priesthood, then the bishop anoints his hands with chrism before presenting him with the chalice and paten which he will use when presiding at the Eucharist. Following this, the gifts of bread and wine are brought forward by the people and given to the new priest; then all the priests present concelebrate the Eucharist, with the newly ordained taking the place of honour at the right of the bishop. If there are several newly ordained, it is they who gather closest to the bishop during the Eucharistic Prayer.

The laying of hands of the priesthood is found in 1 Timothy 4:14:

"Do not neglect the gift you have, which was conferred on you through the prophetic word with the imposition of hands of the presbyterate."

== Deacons ==
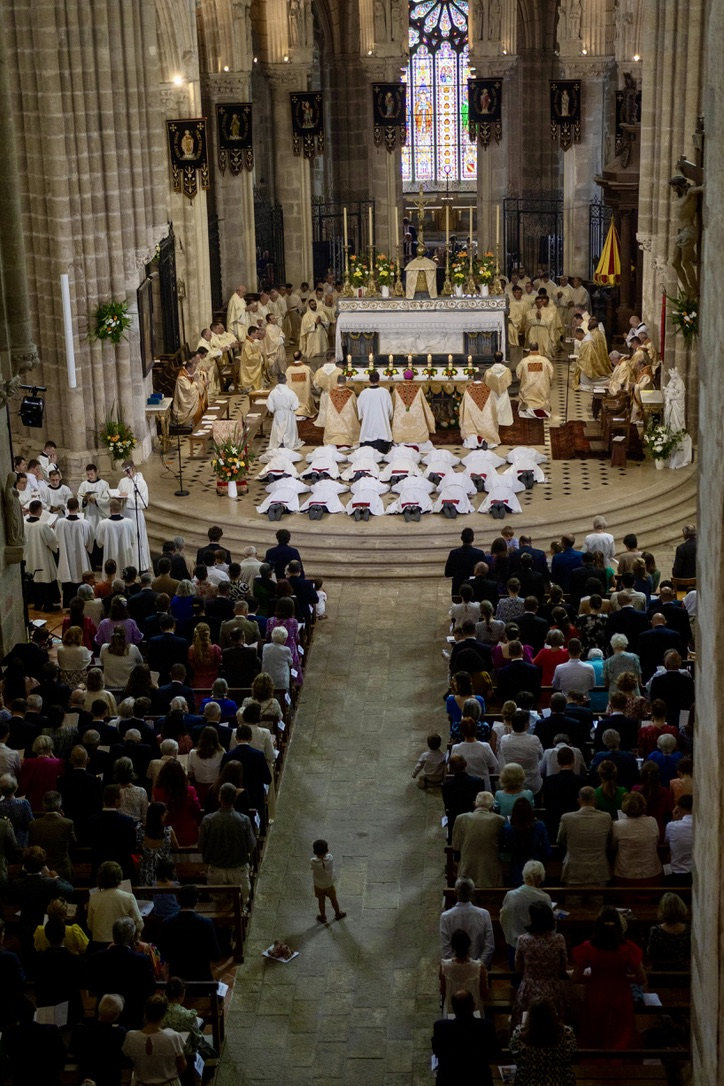
Prostration rite during the ordination of deacons of the Community of Saint Martin, Evron Abbey (2025)

The Diaconate is one of the three Major Orders in the Catholic Church. The first deacons were ordained by the Apostles in Acts of the Apostles chapter 6. The ministry of the deacon in the Roman Catholic Church is described as one of service in three areas: the Word, the Liturgy and Charity. The deacon's ministry of the Word includes proclaiming the Gospel during the Mass, preaching and teaching. The deacon's liturgical ministry includes various parts of the Mass proper to the deacon, including being an ordinary minister of Holy Communion and the proper minister of the chalice when Holy Communion is administered under both kinds. The ministry of charity involves service to the poor and marginalized and working with parishioners to help them become more involved in such ministry.

As clerics, deacons are required to say the Liturgy of the Hours daily. In the Latin Church, deacons, like bishops and priests, are ordinary ministers of the sacrament of baptism and can serve as the church's witness at the sacrament of Holy Matrimony, which the bride and groom administer to each other. Deacons may also preside over funeral rites outside of Mass. They can preside over various services such as Benediction of the Blessed Sacrament, and they may give certain blessings.

In the Eastern Catholic Churches however, deacons can not preside at weddings, as the wedding requires the blessing of a priest to be valid, and they can only baptize in emergencies.

== Minor orders ==
From the 3rd century AD up until seven years after the Second Vatican Council (1962–1965), the Catholic Church had four minor orders (porter, lector, exorcist, and acolyte) up to the order of subdeacon; these orders were conferred on seminarians pro forma before they became deacons. The minor orders and the subdiaconate were not considered sacraments, and for simplicity were suppressed under Pope Paul VI in 1972. Only those orders previously considered major orders of divine institution, deacon, priest, and bishop, were retained in most of the Latin Church.

== Holy orders ==
Holy orders is one of three Catholic sacraments that Catholics believe to make an indelible mark called a sacramental character on the recipient's soul (the other two are baptism and confirmation). This sacrament can only be conferred on baptized men. If a woman attempts to receive the sacrament of holy orders, both she and any persons who attempt to ordain her are excommunicated latae sententiae. Such titles as cardinal, monsignor, archbishop, etc., are not sacramental orders, but simply offices; receiving one of those titles is not an instance of the sacrament of holy orders.

=== Norms ===
The Catholic Church recognizes the validity of holy orders administered by the Eastern Orthodox, Polish National, Oriental Orthodox, and the Assyrian Church of the East because those churches have maintained the apostolic succession of bishops, i.e., their bishops claim to be in a line of succession dating back to the Apostles, just as Catholic bishops do. Consequently, if a priest of one of those eastern churches converts to Catholicism, his ordination is already valid; however, to exercise the order received, he would need to be incardinated either into a diocese or into a clerical religious institute or society of apostolic life in the Catholic Church.

A controversy in the Catholic Church over the question of whether Anglican holy orders are valid was settled by Pope Leo XIII in 1896, who wrote in Apostolicae curae that Anglican orders lack validity because the rite by which priests were ordained was not correctly performed from 1547 to 1553 and from 1558 to the 19th century, thus causing a break of continuity in apostolic succession and a break with the sacramental intention of the Church. Leo XIII condemned the Anglican ordinals and deemed the Anglican orders "absolutely null and utterly void". Some Changes in the Anglican Ordinal since King Edward VI, and a fuller appreciation of the pre-Reformation ordinals suggest, according to some private theologians, that the correctness of the dismissal of Anglican orders may be questioned; however Apostolicae curae remains the definitive teaching of the Catholic Church and was reinforced by then-Cardinal Joseph Ratzinger, who later became Pope Benedict XVI.

Since 1896 many Anglican bishops have been consecrated by bishops of the Old Catholic Church. Nevertheless, all Anglican clergymen who desire to enter the Catholic Church do so as laymen and must be ordained in the Catholic Church in order to serve as priests. Catholics are, according to Ad Tuendam Fidem and Cardinal Ratzinger, obliged to hold the position that Anglican orders are invalid.

Catholics do not recognize the ordination of ministers in other, Protestant, churches that do not maintain the apostolic succession. The Lutheran churches of Sweden and Finland from some point of view possibly possess valid apostolic succession. This is not the case for the Lutheran churches of Norway, Denmark, and Iceland where there occurred breaks in succession.

=== Marriage and holy orders ===
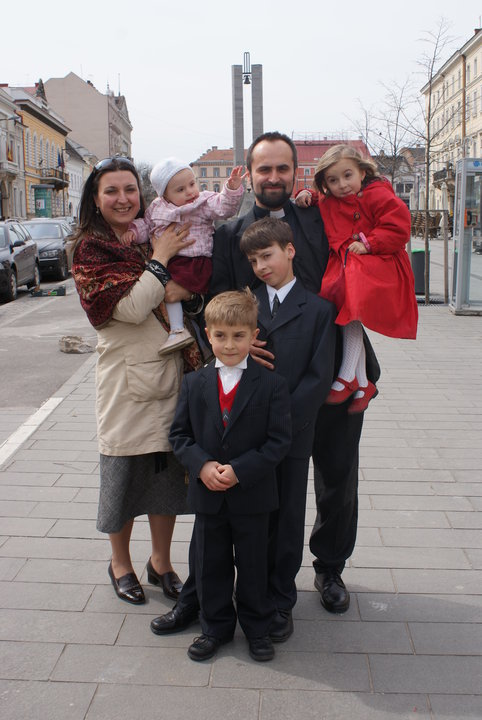
Romanian Greek Catholic priest from Romania with his family.

Married men may be ordained to the diaconate as permanent deacons, but in the Latin Church may not be ordained to the priesthood. Married non-Catholic clergy who convert to Catholicism through the Latin Church may, in some cases, be ordained priests. In the Eastern Catholic Churches and in the Eastern Orthodox Church married deacons may be ordained priests, but may not become bishops. Bishops in the Eastern Catholic and the Eastern Orthodox churches are almost always drawn from among monks, who have taken a vow of celibacy. They may be widowers, though; it is not required of them never to have been married.

==== Clerical celibacy ====
There is a distinction drawn between chastity and celibacy. Celibacy is the state of not being married, so a promise of celibacy is a promise not to enter into marriage but instead to consecrate one's life to service; in other words, "married to God". Chastity, a virtue expected of all Christians, is the state of sexual purity; for a vowed celibate, or for the single person, chastity means the abstinence from sexual activity. For the married person, chastity means the practice of sex only within marriage.

== Bibliography ==
- Council of Trent (1829). "Part 2: On Holy Orders" . The catechism of the Council of Trent. Translated by James Donovan. Lucas Brothers.
- The ordination of a priest (translated from the Roman Pontifical and Missal). Montreal: John Lovell. Jun 8, 1867. p. 12. ISBN 978-0-665-00513-8 – via archive.org.
