= Concelebration =

More than one clergyman celebrating the Holy Mass

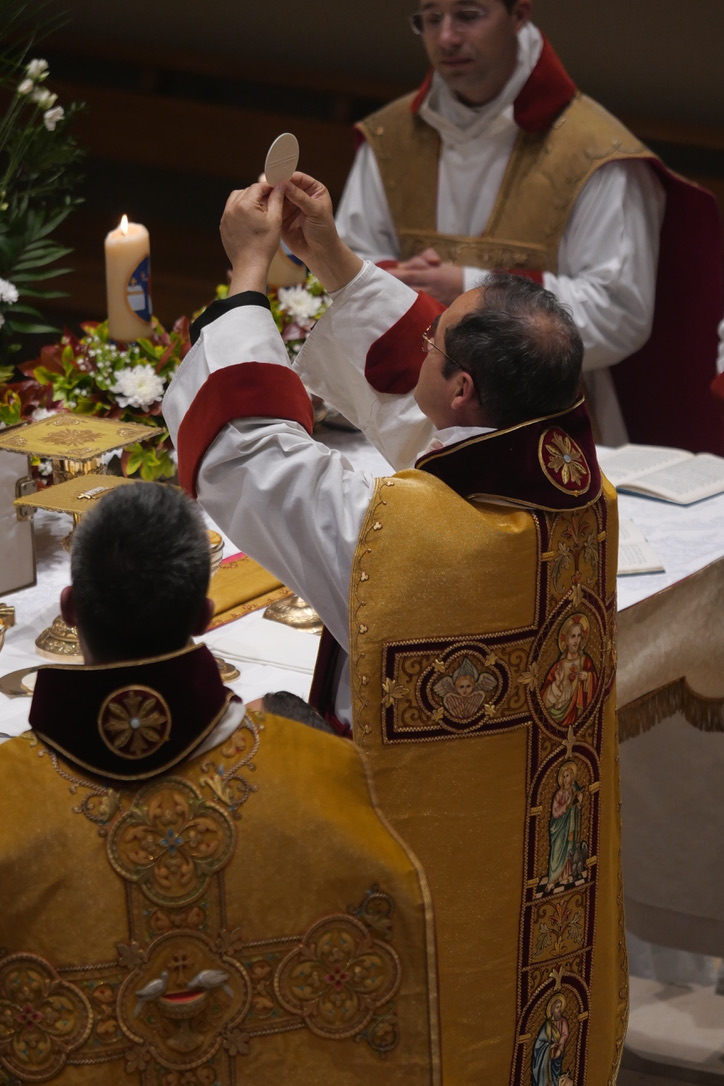
Concelebration France, seminary of the Community of Saint Martin (2024)

In Christianity, concelebration (from the Latin con + celebrare, 'to celebrate together') is the leadership of a congregation by a number of presbyters (priests or ministers) at the celebration of the Eucharist, for Catholics and Evangelical-Lutherans, respectively, during Mass. A senior presbyter, bishop, or archbishop generally acts as the principal celebrant, with other presbyters and bishops present—each participating in the celebration of the Mass and prayerfully assisting at the consecration in particular—known as concelebrants. The concelebrants typically assist the principal celebrant by reciting the Words of Consecration together with them, thus invoking the spiritual change in the eucharistic elements that is at the sacramental heart of the Mass. Certain concelebrants may also individually recite pre-assigned portions of the Eucharistic Prayer while gathered with the principal celebrant around the altar.

Concelebration is often practiced by ministers within a particular church (it is common in major Catholic Masses, for example) and by ministers from Churches that are in full communion with one another (e.g. the Anglican Communion and the Old Catholic Church).

== History ==
Concelebration occurs in Eastern Christianity and has done for many centuries. In the Roman Catholic Church the practice fell into disuse for several centuries but was revived with the liturgical reforms of the Second Vatican Council and as directed by the papal document Sacrosanctum Concilium. Theologians Orlando O. Espín and James B. Nickoloff write that "Eucharistic concelebration has ancient roots (Hippolytus, Apostolic Tradition, early third century) and was practiced primarily as a sign of ecclesial unity of the local church and of union with other churches when eucharistic hospitality was offered to visiting bishops or presbyters."

It is known from early Christian art uncovered through archaeology that concelebration took place in the Early Church in the West, although it is not known precisely when it fell into disuse. It is known that the practice gradually came to be reserved for the greater festival days and other solemn occasions. Columba of Iona, in the 6th century, is recorded to have been requested by a visiting Irish bishop in disguise to celebrate Mass with him. The Second Synod of Seville in 619 ordered that priests could not concelebrate Mass with a bishop or archbishop, or an apostolic administrator if he is a bishop, able to celebrate. According to Pope Innocent III (r. 1198–1216) the cardinals in Rome still concelebrated with the pope on certain feast days. It is known that from the medieval period (particularly following the Black Death) up to the Second Vatican Council there were only two occasions when concelebration took place in the Roman Rite:

- At the ordination of a priest, where the newly ordained concelebrated with the ordaining bishop, and;
- At the consecration of a bishop, when the newly consecrated bishop concelebrated with the consecrating bishop.

== Contemporary practice ==
=== Roman Catholic Church ===
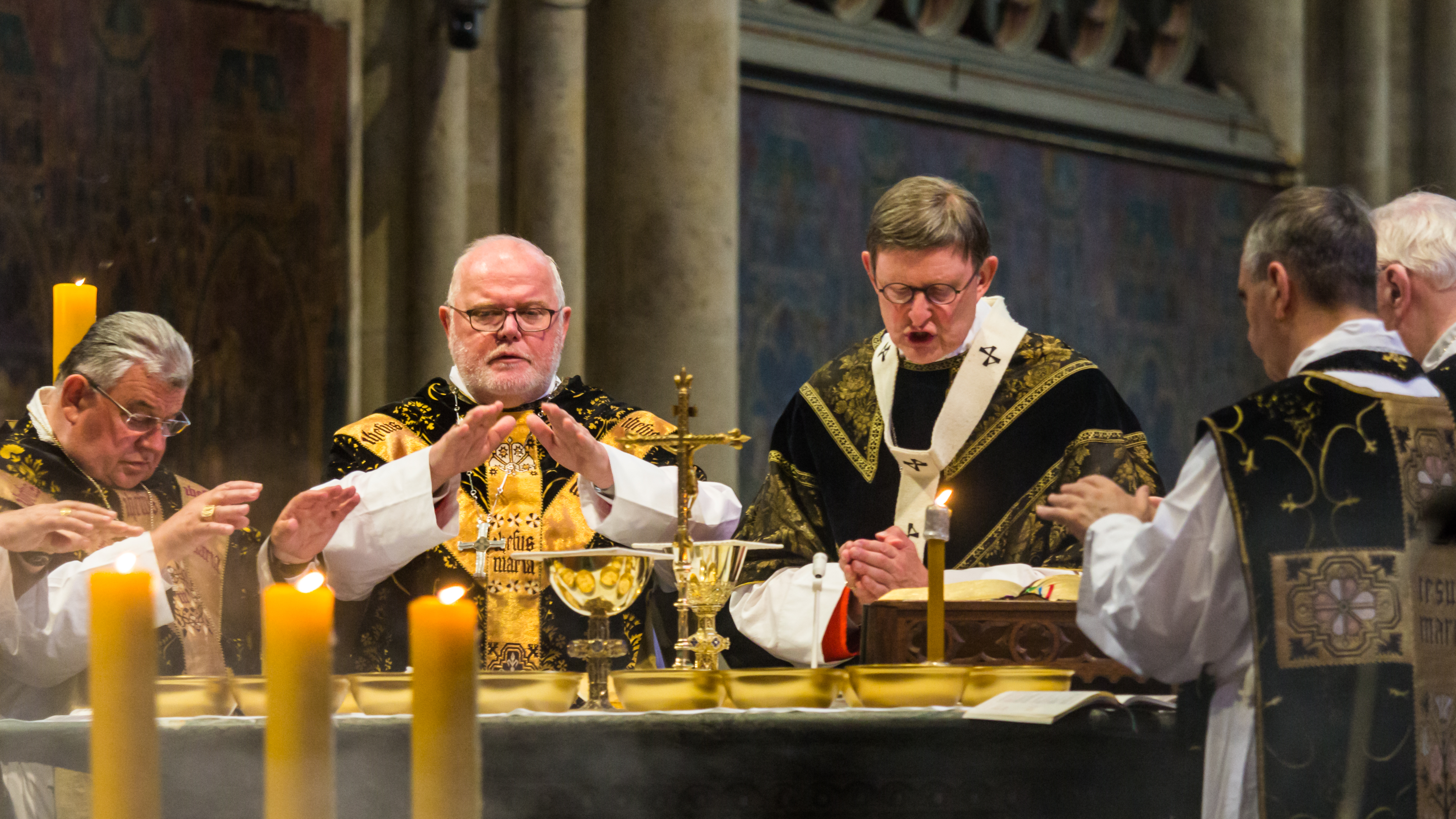
Concelebration at the Requiem Mass of Cardinal Joachim Meisner (2017).

The liturgical reforms following the Second Vatican Council provided for the return to the practice of concelebration of Mass: the Council's Constitution on the Sacred Liturgy stated that

The pre-eminent manifestation of the Church consists in the full active participation of all God's holy people in these liturgical celebrations, especially in the same eucharist, in a single prayer, at one altar, at which there presides the bishop surrounded by his college of priests and by his ministers.

The Council further described liturgical concelebrations where priests "join with the bishop when they celebrate the Eucharistic Sacrifice" as an excellent means of manifesting "the very unity of their consecration and mission". Catholic Liturgical law allows concelebration on any occasion, so communities with more than one priest could have several priests concelebrate the Eucharist rather than each celebrating it in private, emphasizing its communal nature, but it is more common on feasts, especially those at which the bishop traditionally presides, such as the Chrism Mass on Maundy Thursday. If a diocese or archdiocese is vacant and an apostolic administrator that is a bishop is not able to celebrate, a selected group of priests within the diocese will then concelebrate the feast with one of them being a principal celebrant.

An article in La Civiltà Cattolica of 2 October 2004 pointed out that the reintroduction of Eucharistic concelebration in the Latin Church was in line with the teaching of Pope Pius XII, who taught that the two "assistant bishops" at the consecration of a new bishop should speak all the words of consecration, thus indicating clearly that, instead of being merely witnesses, they were co-consecrating, concelebrating the sacrament of orders. He applied the same rule to concelebration of the Eucharist (at that time in use only at ordination to episcopacy and to priesthood) in his talk of 22 September 1956.

=== Evangelical-Lutheran Churches ===
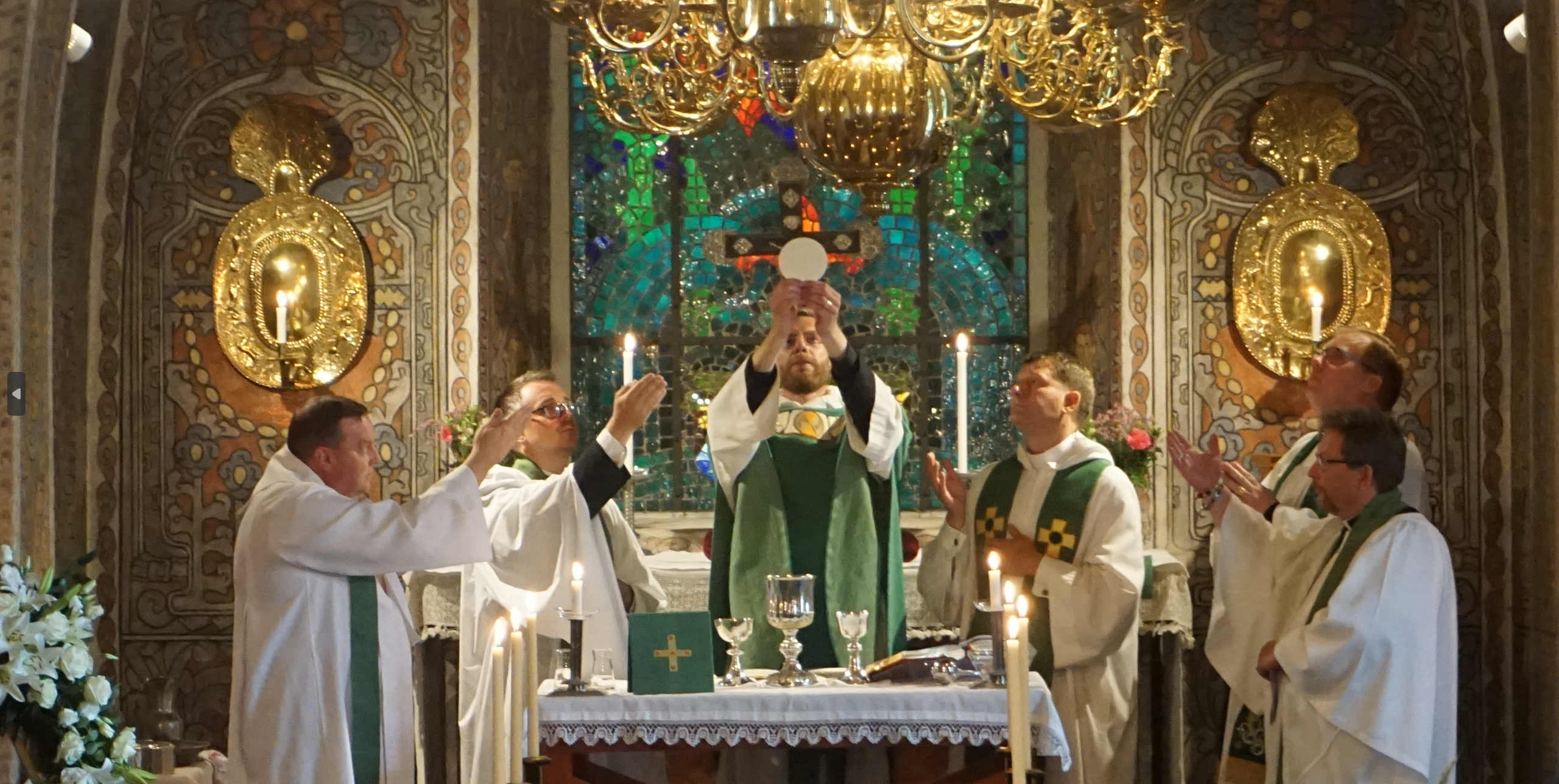
Evangelical-Lutheran priests concelebrating the Mass at Alsike Church, Sweden (2023).

In the Evangelical-Lutheran Churches, there are different meanings of the word "concelebration": the word can mean, as in the Catholic Church, that more than one cleric celebrates the Mass. This occurs when a bishop is visiting a congregation or if a priest from one congregation visits another.

It also refers to joint services led by clergy from different denominations.

=== Anglican Communion ===
The Anglican Book of Common Prayer directs other clergy to "stand with the celebrant at the Altar, and join in the consecration of the gifts, in breaking the Bread, and in distributing Communion", without calling this procedure "concelebration". Anyhow, the word "concelebration" exists in Episcopalian theology.

== Gallery ==
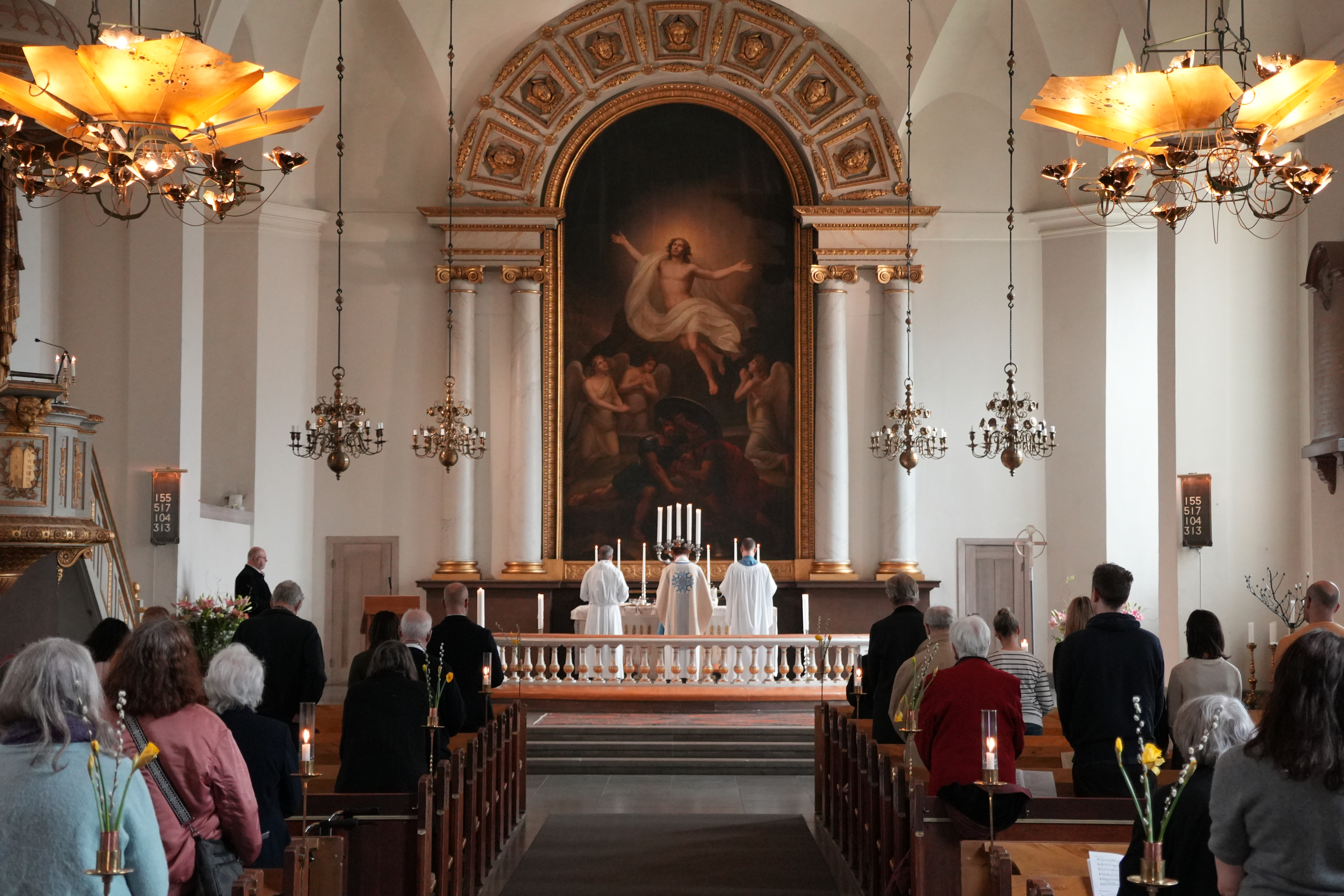
The concelebration of Easter Monday Mass by priests of the Church of Sweden at Kungsholm Evangelical-Lutheran Church in Stockholm, Sweden

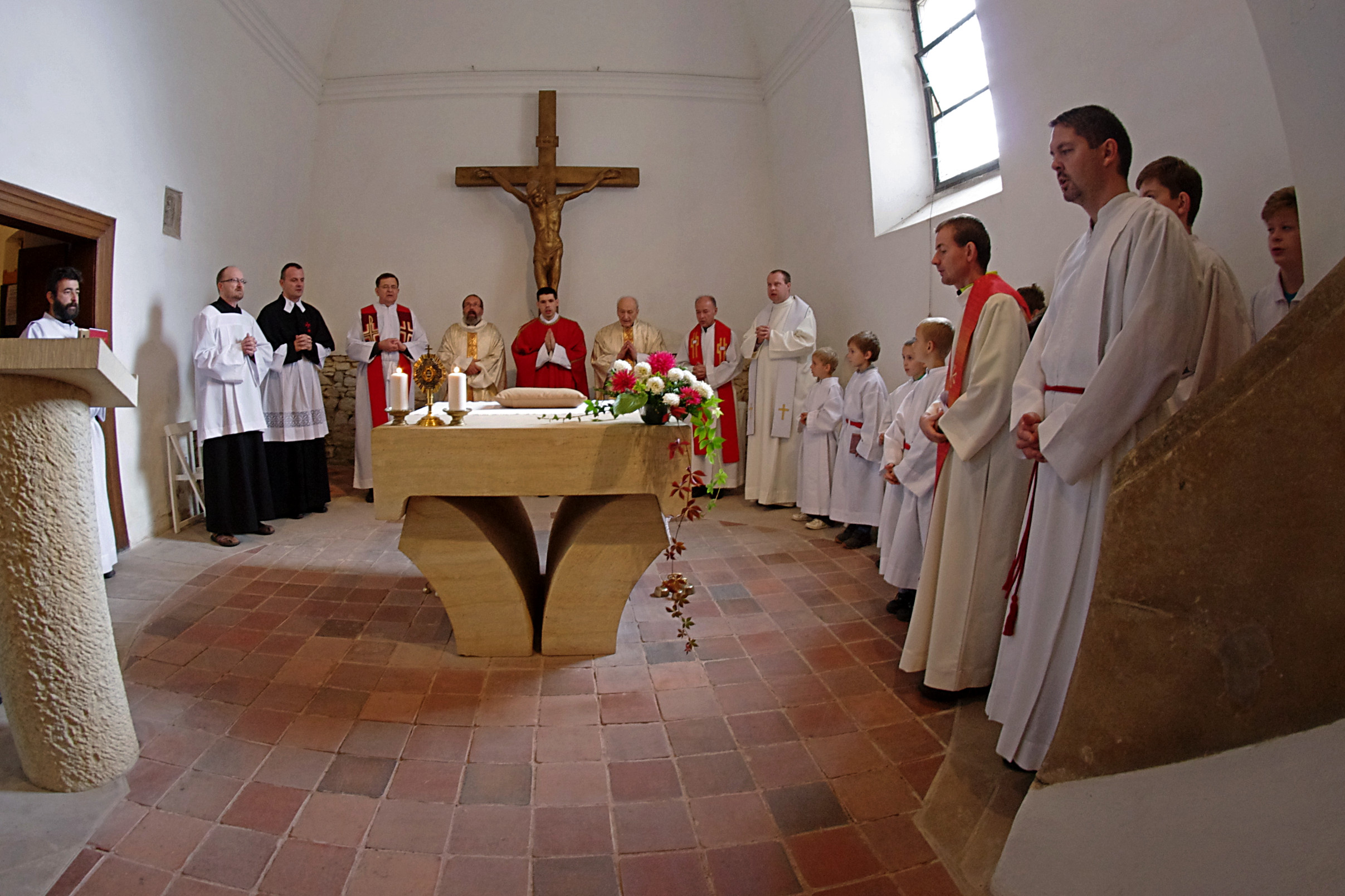
The concelbration of Mass by priests of the Catholic Church in Budeč, Czech Republic

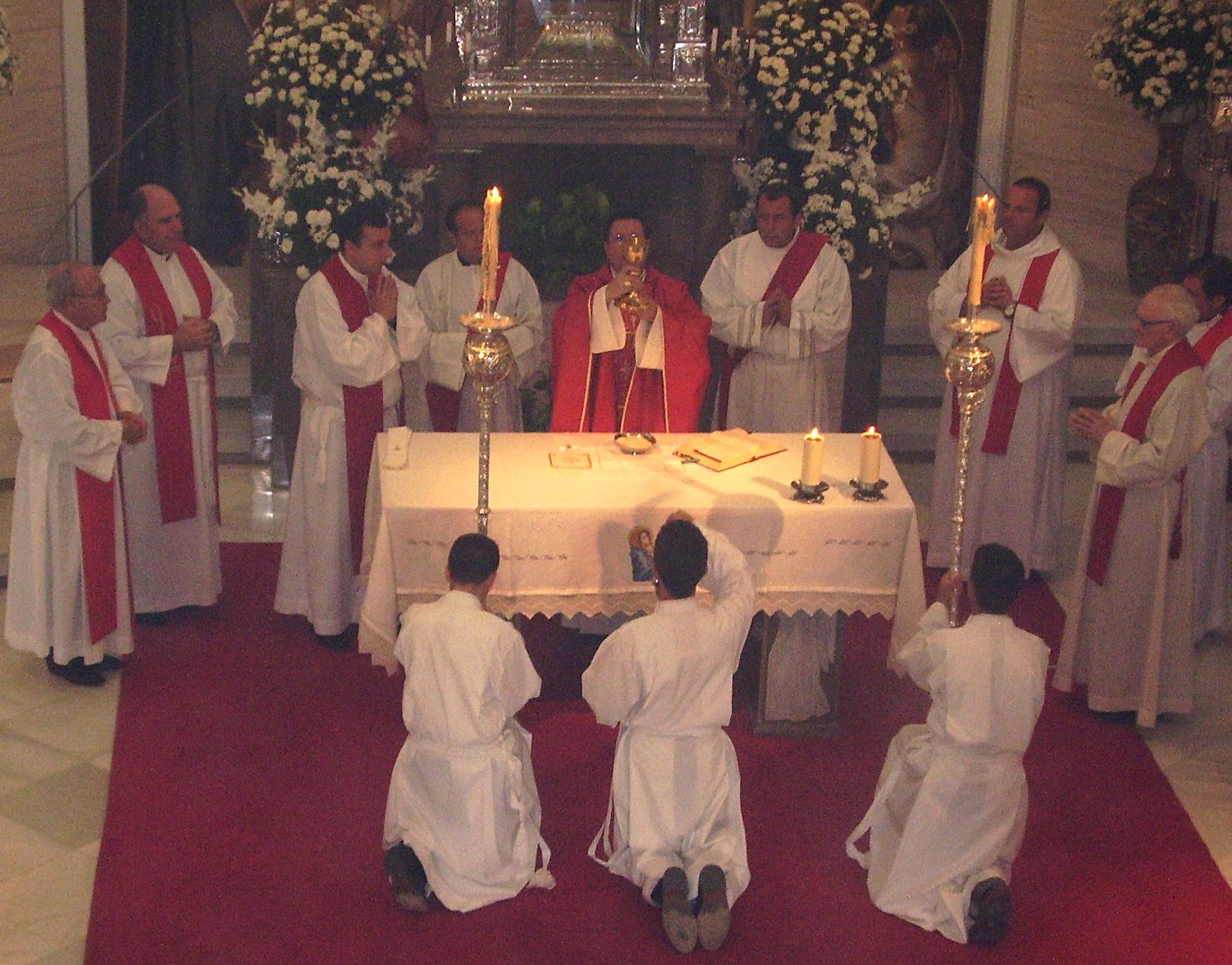
Concelebration in the seminary of Asidonia-Jerez (2005)

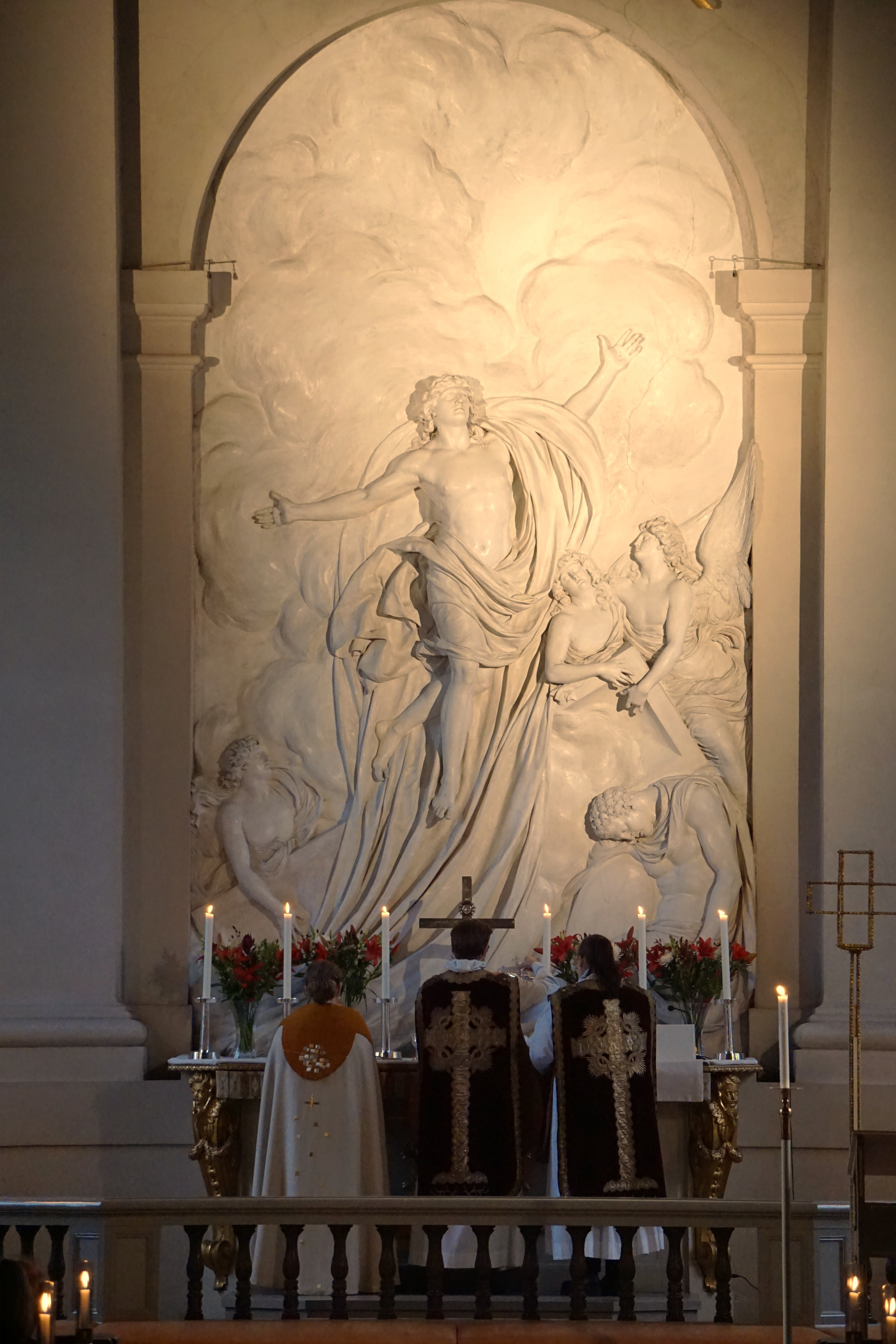
Concelebration of an Evangelical-Lutheran Mass during the season of Advent at Adolf Fredrik Church in Sweden (2024)

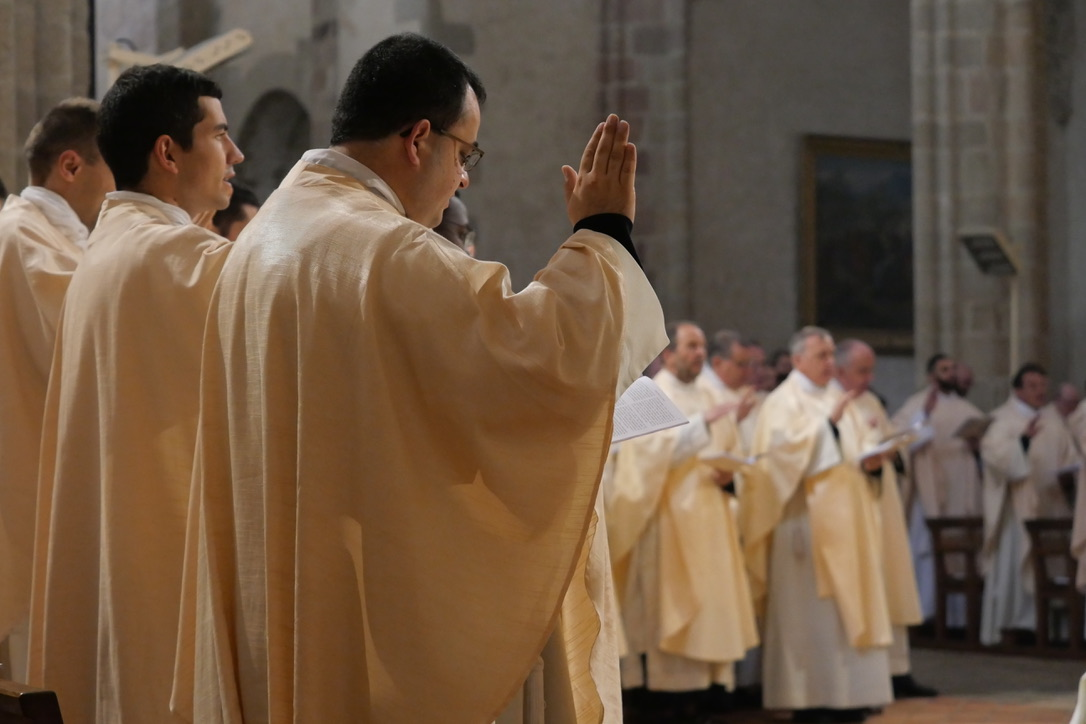
Concelebration in the Evron basilica, France, Community of Saint Martin (2022)

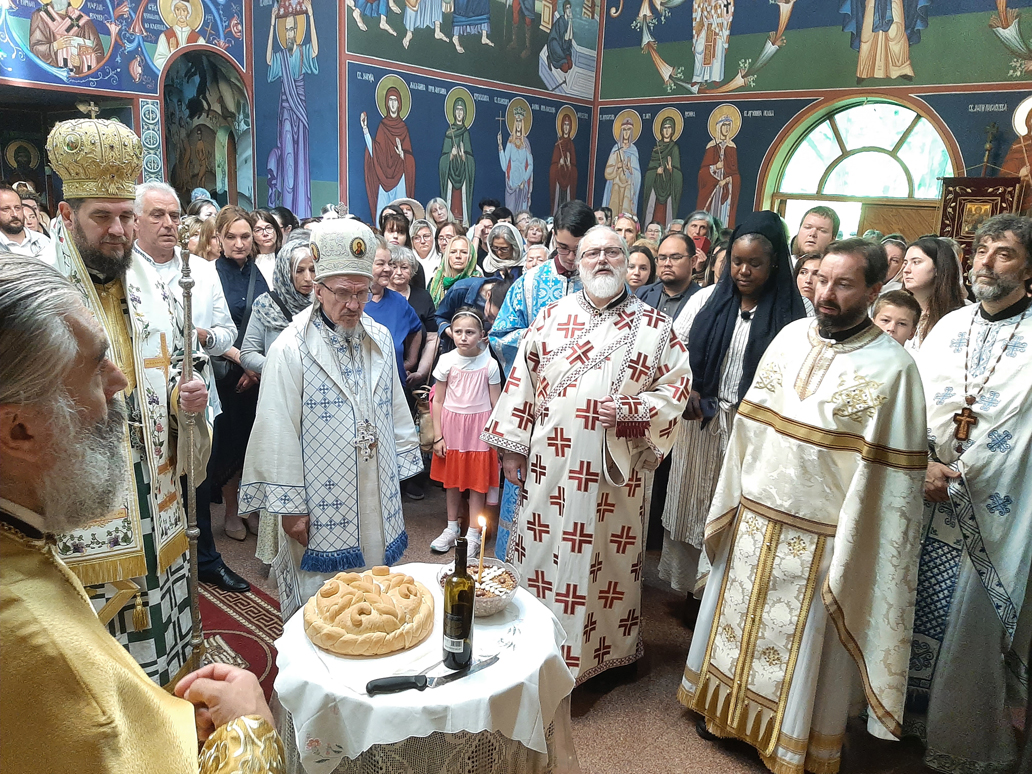
Eastern Orthodox clergy concelebrating in Canada (2026)
