= Saint-Christophe-du-Luat =

- Part of Évron
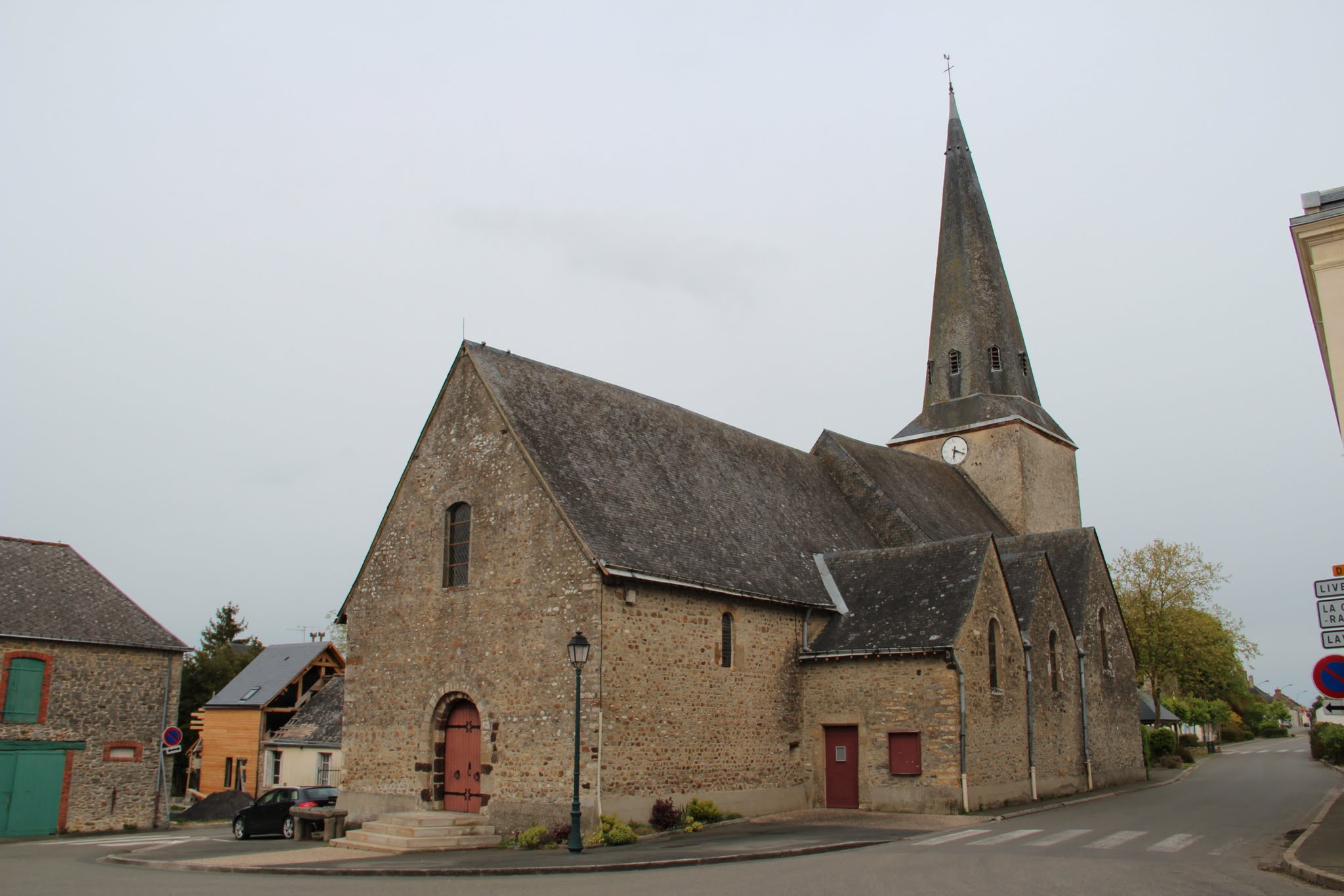
- The parish church in Saint-Christophe-du-Luat
- Location of Saint-Christophe-du-Luat
- Location within France Location within Pays de la Loire
- Coordinates: 48°08′04″N 0°27′36″W
- Country: France
- Region: Pays de la Loire
- Department: Mayenne
- Arrondissement: Mayenne
- Canton: Évron
- Commune: Évron
- Area^{1}: 19.12 km^{2} (7.38 sq mi)
- Elevation: 92 m (302 ft)
- Highest elevation: 137 m (449 ft)
- Lowest elevation: 74 m (243 ft)
- Population (2022): 780
  - Density: 41/km^{2} (110/sq mi)
- Time zone: UTC+01:00 (CET)
  - Summer (DST): UTC+02:00 (CEST)
- Postal code: 53150
- ^{1} French Land Register data, which excludes lakes, ponds, glaciers > 1 km^{2} (0.386 sq mi or 247 acres) and river estuaries.

Saint-Christophe-du-Luat (French pronunciation: [sɛ̃ kʁistɔf dy lɥa]) is a former commune in the Mayenne department in north-western France. On 1 January 2019, it was merged into the commune Évron.

== See also ==
- Communes of Mayenne
