= Châtres-la-Forêt =

- Part of Évron
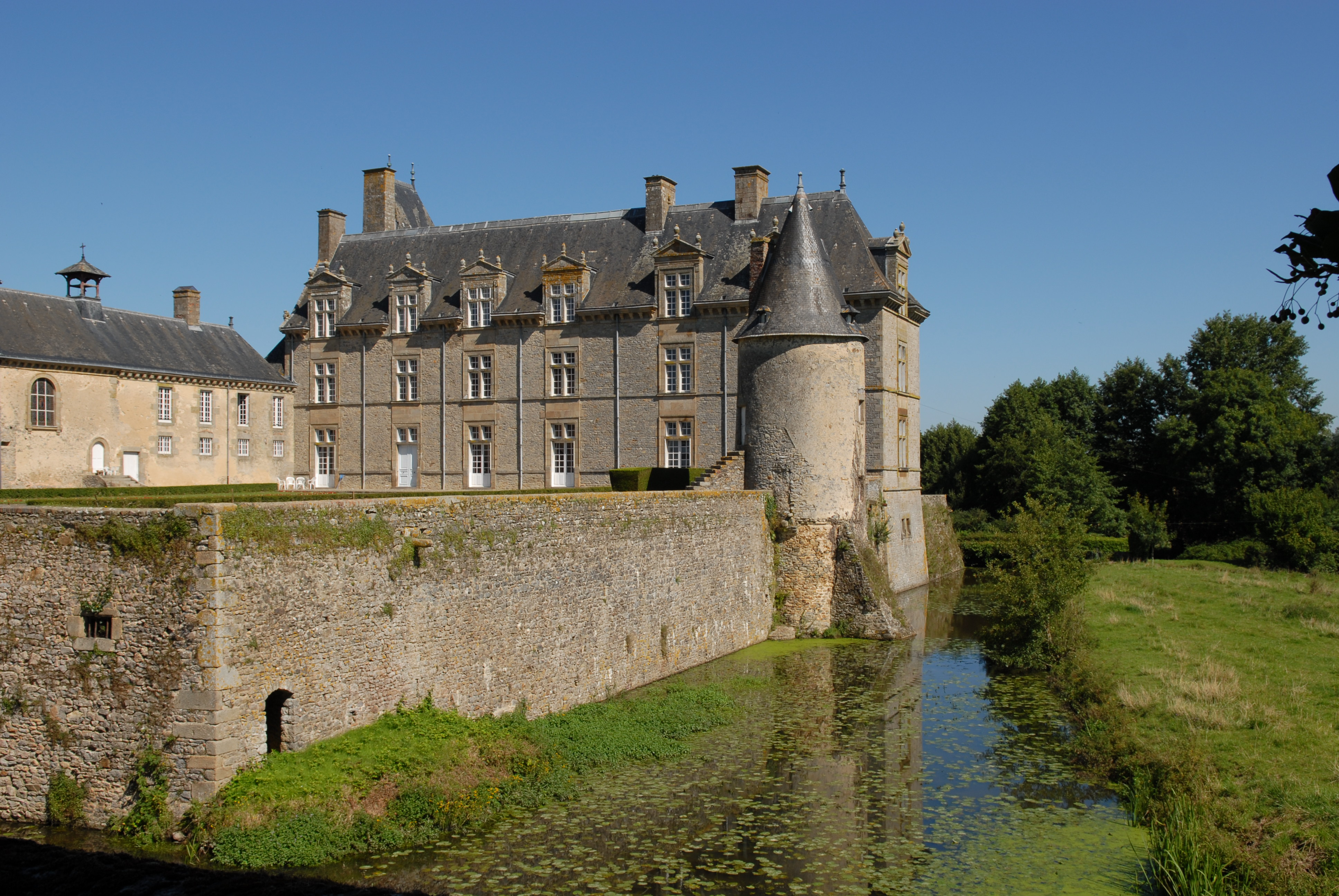
- The Château de Montecler
- Location of Châtres-la-Forêt
- Location within France Location within Pays de la Loire
- Coordinates: 48°08′03″N 0°25′50″W
- Country: France
- Region: Pays de la Loire
- Department: Mayenne
- Arrondissement: Mayenne
- Canton: Évron
- Commune: Évron
- Area^{1}: 13.60 km^{2} (5.25 sq mi)
- Elevation: 103 m (338 ft)
- Highest elevation: 129 m (423 ft)
- Lowest elevation: 82 m (269 ft)
- Population (2022): 782
  - Density: 57.5/km^{2} (149/sq mi)
- Time zone: UTC+01:00 (CET)
  - Summer (DST): UTC+02:00 (CEST)
- Postal code: 53600
- ^{1} French Land Register data, which excludes lakes, ponds, glaciers > 1 km^{2} (0.386 sq mi or 247 acres) and river estuaries.

Châtres-la-Forêt (French pronunciation: [ʃatʁ la fɔʁɛ]) is a former commune in the Mayenne department in north-western France. On 1 January 2019, it was merged into the commune Évron.

== See also ==
- Communes of the Mayenne department
