= Community of Saint Martin =

Catholic association of priests living in community

- Communauté Saint-Martin
- Abbreviation: CSM
- Formation: 1976
- Founders: Jean-François Guérin
- Type: Public clerical association of pontifical right
- Headquarters: Évron, France
- Members: 185 priests, over 100 seminarians; (2023)
- general moderator: Paul Préaux
- Website: https://www.communautesaintmartin.org/

The Community of Saint Martin is a Catholic public clerical association of pontifical right, comprising priests and deacons. It was founded in 1976 by Fr Jean-François Guérin, a French priest from the Archdiocese of Tours, under the protection of the Italian cardinal Giuseppe Siri, Archbishop of Genoa. The community focuses on traditionalist liturgy, with its priests wearing cassocks and offering Novus Ordo Mass often in Latin, with Gregorian chant and facing ad orientem.

In 2023, the community included 185 priests and deacons and more than 100 seminarians. Priests of the community work in parishes, schools, nursing homes, chaplaincies, or sanctuaries in 30 dioceses in France, Germany, Austria, Cuba and Italy. The priests and deacons of the community are sent in groups of at least three to live and pray together in a spiritual and practical brotherhood.

== History ==
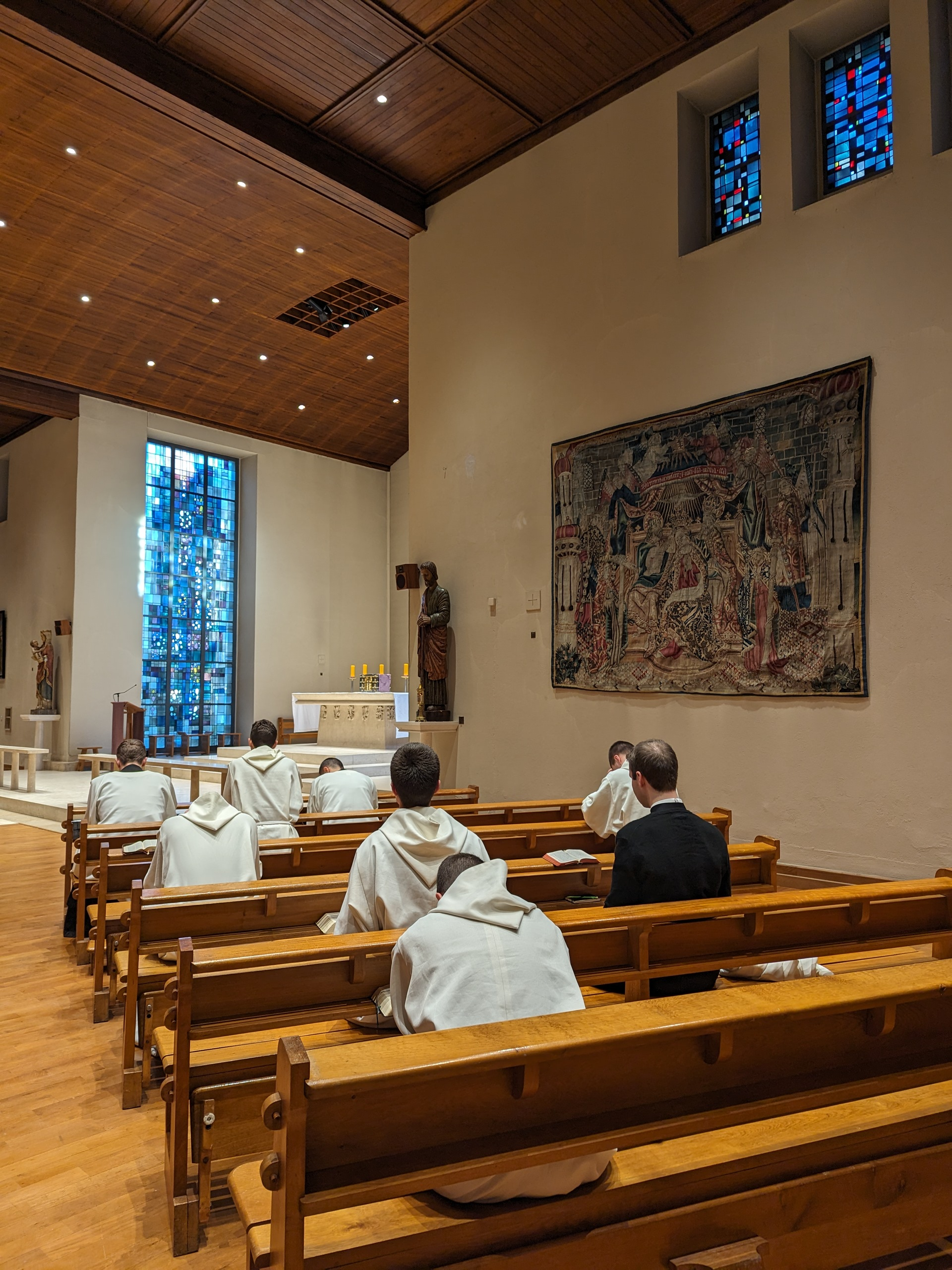
Silent prayer in the chapel of the seminary of the Community of Saint Martin, Évron (France), 2024

Between 1965 and 1976, Guérin was active in Paris. He was chaplain of the Basilica of Sacré Cœur in Montmartre, and he had an important apostolate with the youth as many had chosen him as their spiritual director. While many of these youths chose to enter a religious order, often in the Benedictine and Carmelite traditions, some felt that their call was to become secular priests in the same way that Guérin was. This meant living their priesthood in community with others and pursuing his liturgical spirit rooted in the Latin and Gregorian tradition of the Roman rite, and in the liturgical movement as it found its clear expression in the Second Vatican Council.

As Cardinal Siri sought to help the French Church to promote the renewal of priestly training, he received Fr. Guérin and his first seminarians in his archdiocese in 1976. Thus the Community of Saint Martin was founded in Italy to give priests to the Catholic Church in France. Guérin and his students established themselves in the Capuchin convent of Genoa-Voltri. The seminarians followed the academic part of their training in the Genoa seminary, while Guérin took charge of their human and spiritual formation.

By 1979, the first ordinations to priesthood took place.

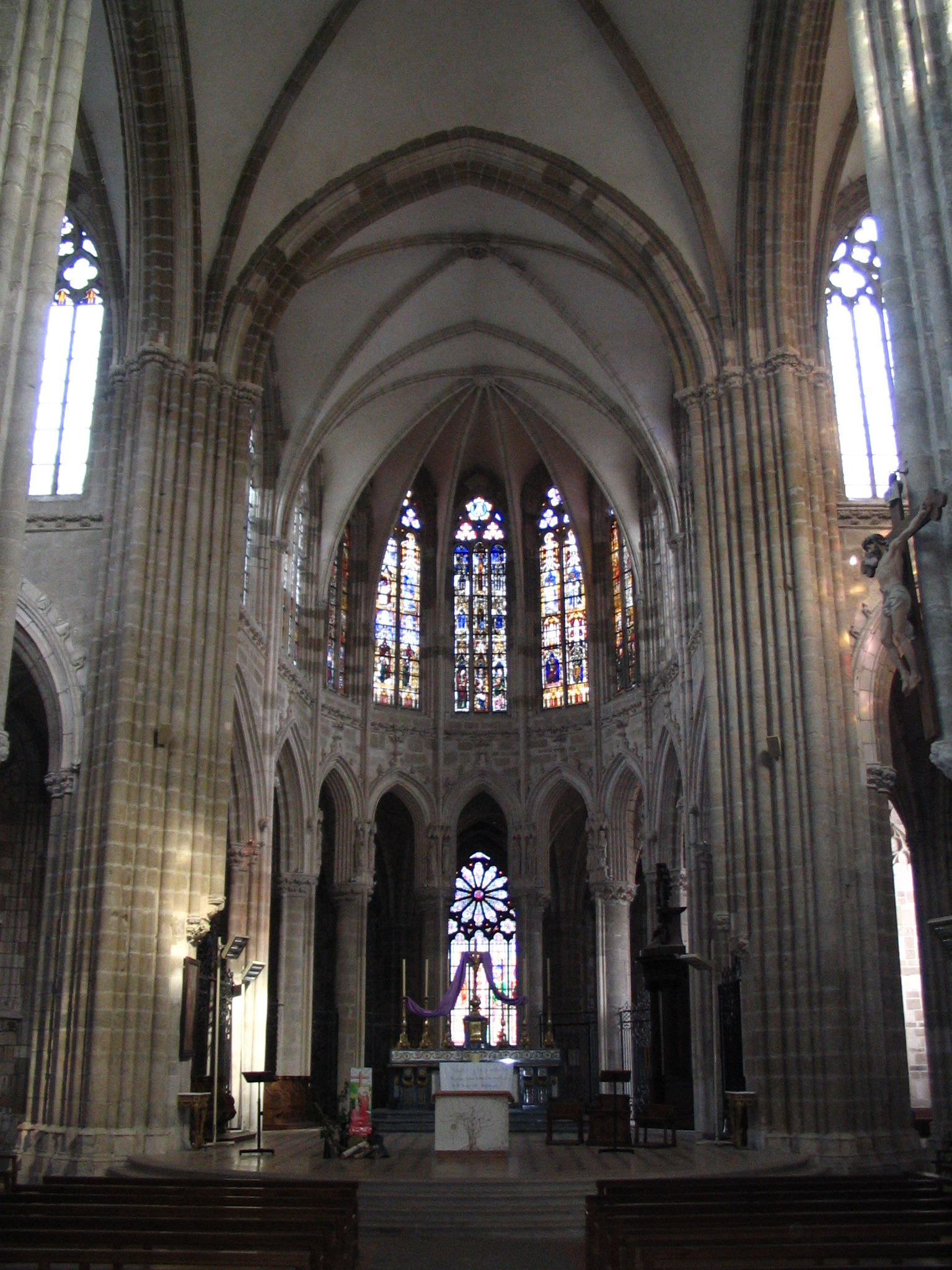
Basilica of Notre-Dame de l'Épine, Évron

In 1983 the Community got its first pastoral mission in the diocese of Fréjus-Toulon in south-eastern France. In the following years, other French bishops entrusted parishes to the Community.

In 1993 there was an opportunity for the Mother House to move from Italy and to establish the Community's seminary in France in the village of Candé-sur-Beuvron, near Blois in the Loire Valley. After twenty years there, the Community moved to Évron in north-western France to accommodate the sharp increase in vocations.

Since 2010, abbé Paul Préaux is the general moderator of the community, reelected in 2016 an again in 2022.

In September 2014, the Community moved its Mother House and House of Training to the former Évron Abbey in the department of Mayenne. There the intellectual formation of the seminarians is given by their School of Theology, affiliated since 2007 with the Pontifical Lateran University. The human and spiritual formation is given by a team of six full-time priests while the pastoral formation takes place during the vacations and during the intermediate year between the cycle of philosophy and theology when each seminarian spends one year living in a parish of the Community. Their training consists of eight years in all to become a priest, but some choose to become unmarried permanent deacons.

== Canonical status ==
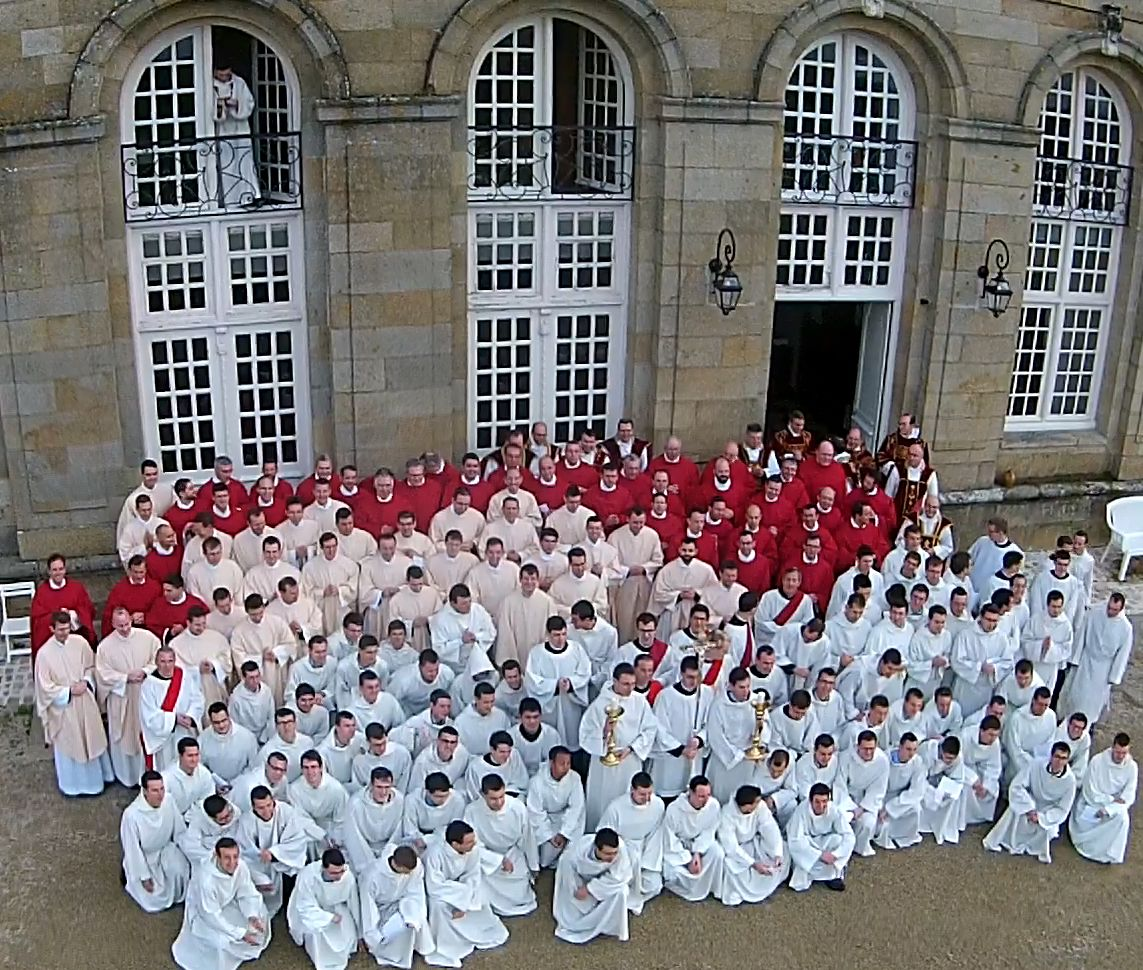
Priests, deacons, and seminarians of the community in Évron

Canonically, the community is a public clerical association of pontifical right. The superior general of the community is called "moderator".

The first canonical recognition of the Community was granted by Cardinal Siri in 1979. His successor as archbishop of Genoa, Cardinal Giovanni Canestri, recognized the Community as a public clerical association of diocesan right. In 2000 it got the status of a public clerical association of pontifical right attached to the dicastery for the Clergy. In 2008 the then-Congregation for the clergy gave the Moderator-General of the community the authority to incardinate its members, priests and deacons. He is elected by the general assembly of members for a term of 6 years, and confirmed by the dicastery for the Clergy.

The members report hierarchically to the moderator of the community, with a duty of obedience to the bishop of the diocese to which they are sent.

== Missions ==
Priests of the Community work in parishes, schools, nursing homes, chaplaincies, or sanctuaries in 37 towns and cities in France, as well as in Neviges (Germany), Thalgau (Austria) and in Placetas (Cuba). Some members of the Community are also at the service of the Holy See, and entrusted with various missions in Rome or in apostolic nunciatures. The priests and deacons of the Community are sent in small groups of at least three to live and pray together in a spiritual and practical brotherhood.

In the community's seminary, the formation is delivered “with a particular focus on the human development of its priests”.

== Spirituality ==
The main characteristics of the Community are the mobility of its members and the fact that they live their ministry together.

“Martinian” spirituality has three sources:

- The Benedictine tradition of the Solesmes Congregation. Father Guérin was an oblate of Fontgombault Abbey and a disciple of Prosper Guéranger's spirituality of the liturgical year. He was also inherited from the developments of the twentieth century by the liturgical movement.
- The French school of spirituality with figures such as Pierre de Bérulle and Vincent de Paul as well as the Society of the Priests of Saint Sulpice.
- The communal life as lived out by the Canons Regular under the Rule of Saint Augustine.

Drawing from these three traditions, Lectio Divina is a daily practice for the Community as well as the celebration of the Liturgy of the Hours sung in Latin according to the Ordinary form of the Roman Rite.

== See also ==
- Martin of Tours
