= Marian pilgrimage of Neviges =

Marian chapel of the pilgrimage church Maria, Königin des Friedens

The Marian pilgrimage of Neviges is a Catholic pilgrimage in Neviges, part of Velbert, Germany. The veneration of a miraculous image of the Immaculate Conception dates back to 1681. The principal pilgrimage church Maria, Königin des Friedens, consecrated in 1968, was designed by Gottfried Böhm.

== Miraculous image ==
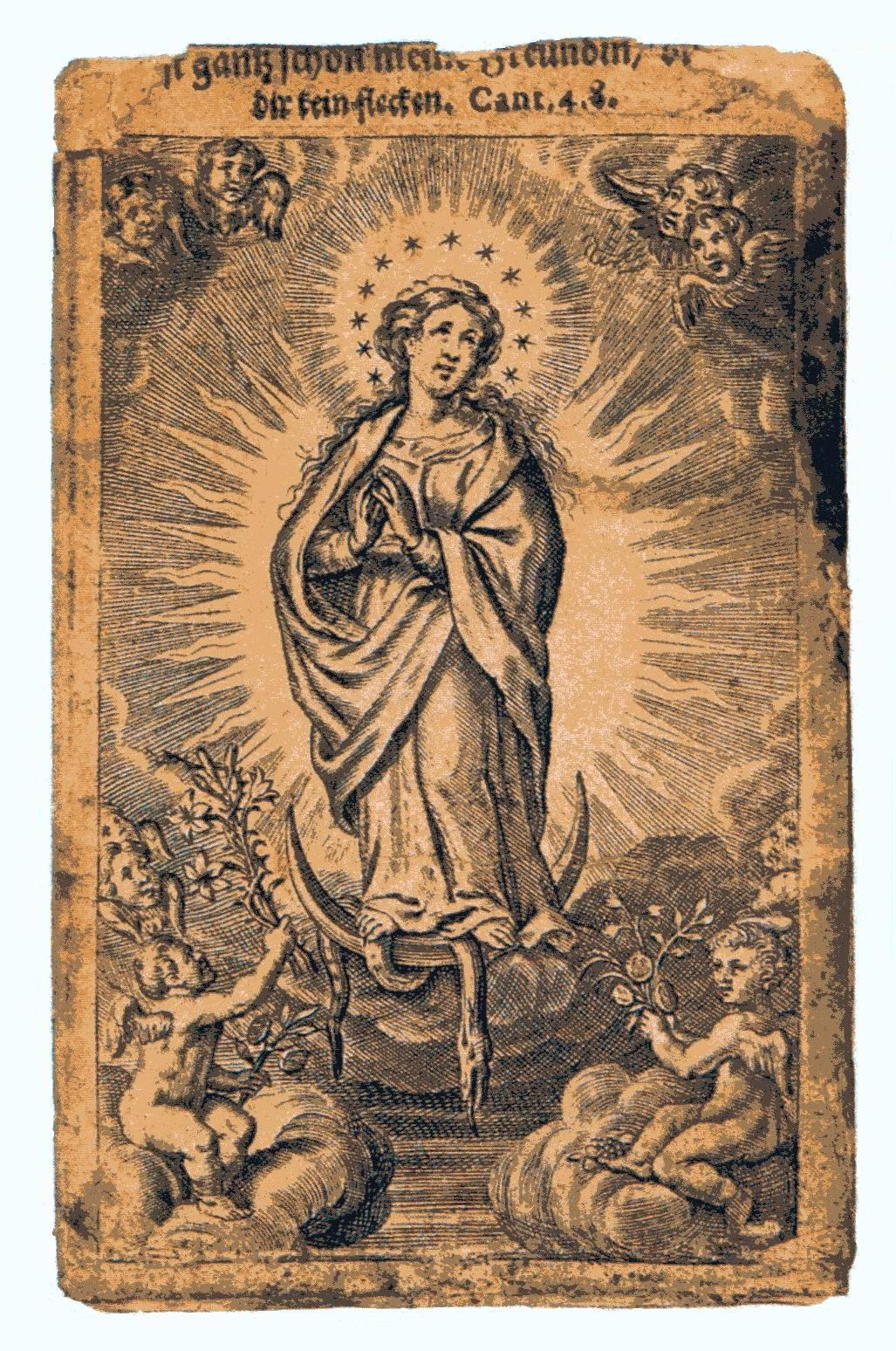
Miraculous image of Neviges

In September 1680, in the monastery of Dorsten, the Franciscan Antonius Schirley was praying in front of an image of the Immaculate Conception when he heard a voice with the message: "Take me to the Hardenberg, there I will be venerated". In the two following nights he had two more auditions. First, he was instructed to contact the Franciscans in Neviges and tell them that a prince was facing an illness from which he could only recover by taking a vow and supporting the building of the monastery. The following night he received the order to begin a novena and to celebrate Holy Mass on Saturdays for nine weeks "in gratitude for my Immaculate Conception".

In fact, the Prince Bishop of Paderborn and Münster, Ferdinand von Fürstenberg, who had fallen ill, recovered after taking his vows. With his help, the foundation stone of the monastery was laid. On 25 October, the first pilgrimage to Neviges took place, attended by the Prince-Bishop, the Abbot of Werden and the pious sovereign Duke Jan Wellem.

== History of the pilgrimage ==
The pilgrimage to the image of grace in the chapel of St. Anna on the Hardenberg in Neviges, founded in 1681, was so successful that a larger church had to be built on the site of the previous chapel. It was consecrated on 29 June 1728 and bears the patrocinium "Immaculate Conception". It served as the monastery church of the Franciscan monastery built in 1683 until its dissolution in 2020.

The Franciscan monastery church is a single-nave hall building in Gothic style. A simple ridge turret replaces the bell tower, as was customary in medieval mendicant churches. The altars are in baroque style, one is the former altar of grace. The painting of the Assumption of Mary is the work of the Venetian Jacopo Palma the Younger.

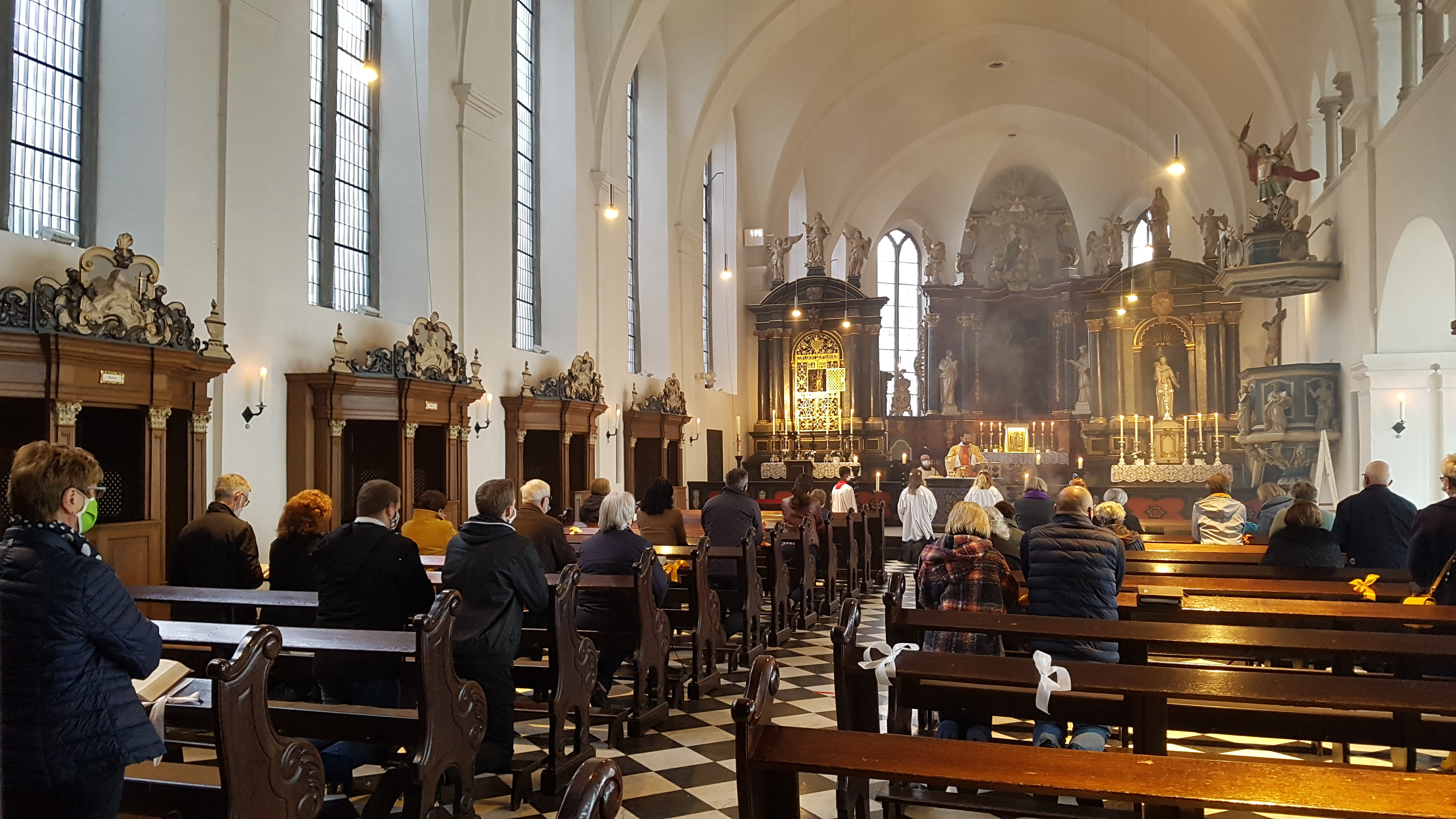
Church of the Immaculate Conception in Neviges

The pilgrimage experienced an upswing under Father Basil Pfannenschmied after the end of the Prussian Kulturkampf, which required additional space for prayer and devotion. At the same time, the call for an open-air Way of the Cross, like the one that already existed in Kevelaer, intensified. As a result, the owner of Hardenberg Castle, Baroness Leonie von Wendt zu Holtfeld (1815–1896) donated an area on the steep hill near the parish church. Here, the Franciscan Alexander Potthast laid out a processional way with 14 walled grottos, in which terracotta reliefs originally depicted the scenes of the Via Dolorosa.

With the same idea in mind, the Franciscans also acquired a site on the "Hellersberg". This was developed into a park with processional paths. Between 1913 and 1936, 15 rosary stations were erected. The stations are worked in stone reliefs or in groups of figures, the last 3 by the Franciscan sculptor Firminus Wickenhäuser. In 2005, Pater Laurentius Ulrich Englisch created 5 more stelae for the Luminous Mysteries. A Marian Chapel stands on the highest point. In the time before the Neviges pilgrimage church was built, the so-called "Hardenberger Sturmandachten" took place on the meeting place in front of it.

From 1942 to 1969, Cardinal Josef Frings promoted the pilgrimage. During his time as Archbishop of Cologne, the pilgrimage church Maria, Königin des Friedens was built from 1966 to 1968 according to a design by the architect Gottfried Böhm, who died in 2021. Cardinal Karol Wojtyła visited the "Mariendom" on 23 September 1978 with the German and Polish bishops under the leadership of Primate Cardinal Wyszyński and Cardinal Höffner, 23 days before Wojtyła was elected Pope John Paul II. In 1981, the 300th anniversary of the pilgrimage could be celebrated.

After the German Franciscan Province had given up the Neviges monastery at the end of January 2020 due to a lack of personnel, the French priestly Community of Saint Martin took over the care of the pilgrimage with three priests on 1 September of the same year.

== See also ==
- Werl pilgrimage, another Marian pilgrimage in Western Germany
