= Évron =

- Commune
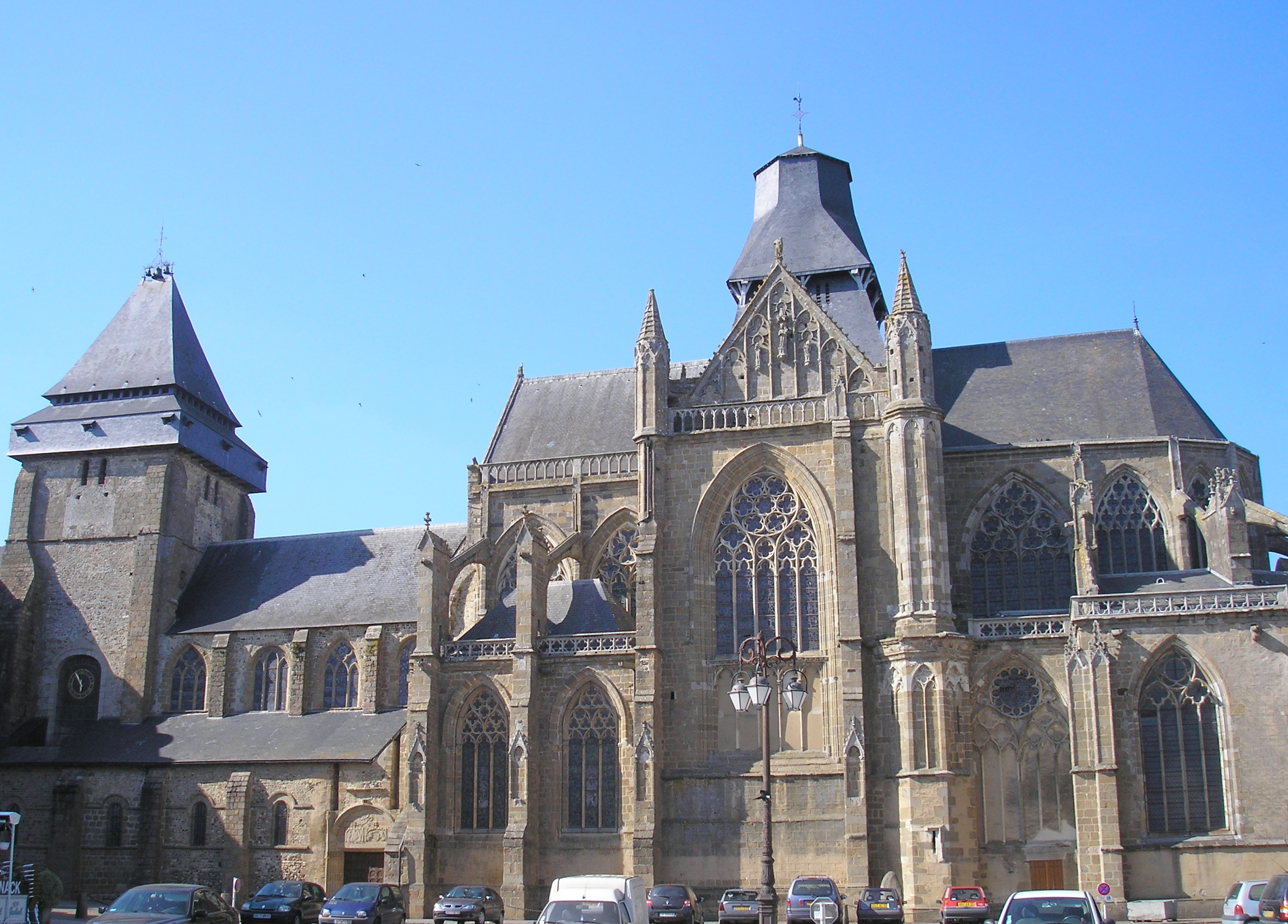
- The Basilica of Our Lady

- Coat of arms
- Location of Évron
- Location within France Location within Pays de la Loire
- Coordinates: 48°09′23″N 0°24′05″W
- Country: France
- Region: Pays de la Loire
- Department: Mayenne
- Arrondissement: Mayenne
- Canton: Évron

Government
  - Mayor (2020–2026): Joël Balandraud
- Area^{1}: 68.24 km^{2} (26.35 sq mi)
- Elevation: 114 m (374 ft)
- Highest elevation: 200 m (660 ft)
- Lowest elevation: 74 m (243 ft)
- Population (2023): 8,252
  - Density: 120.9/km^{2} (313.2/sq mi)
- Time zone: UTC+01:00 (CET)
  - Summer (DST): UTC+02:00 (CEST)
- INSEE/Postal code: 53097 /53600
- ^{1} French Land Register data, which excludes lakes, ponds, glaciers > 1 km^{2} (0.386 sq mi or 247 acres) and river estuaries.

Évron (French pronunciation: [evʁɔ̃]) is a commune in the Mayenne department in north-western France. On 1 January 2019, the former communes Châtres-la-Forêt and Saint-Christophe-du-Luat were merged into Évron. Évron is noted for the Basilica of Notre-Dame de l'Épine (12th century), formerly the church of the suppressed Évron Abbey, with 13th-century wall paintings and Aubusson tapestries. The nave and tower of the church date from the 11th century; the rest of the structure dates from the 18th century

Évron is the home to the largest Babybel Cheese factory globally and accounts for 18% of "Group Bel" global production. The plant processes 650k litres of milk a day making the surrounding countryside heavily geared to milk production and the growing of winter feed for the dairy herds.

== Population ==
The population data given in the table below refer to the commune in its geography as of January 2025.

Historical population
Year	Pop.	±% p.a.
1968	5,413	—
1975	6,376	+2.37%
1982	7,450	+2.25%
1990	8,025	+0.93%
1999	8,477	+0.61%
2007	8,614	+0.20%
2012	8,703	+0.21%
2017	8,671	−0.07%
2023	8,252	−0.82%
Source: INSEE

== International relations ==
Évron is twinned with:

- Hertford, United Kingdom
- Wildeshausen, Germany

== Climate ==
Climate data for Évron (1991–2020 normals, extremes 1945–present)
Month	Jan	Feb	Mar	Apr	May	Jun	Jul	Aug	Sep	Oct	Nov	Dec	Year
Record high °C (°F)	16.0 (60.8)	20.5 (68.9)	23.8 (74.8)	29.0 (84.2)	33.9 (93.0)	37.2 (99.0)	41.0 (105.8)	39.5 (103.1)	35.4 (95.7)	29.5 (85.1)	22.0 (71.6)	16.9 (62.4)	41.0 (105.8)
Mean daily maximum °C (°F)	8.1 (46.6)	9.4 (48.9)	12.8 (55.0)	16.0 (60.8)	19.6 (67.3)	23.0 (73.4)	25.2 (77.4)	25.2 (77.4)	21.8 (71.2)	16.6 (61.9)	11.6 (52.9)	8.6 (47.5)	16.5 (61.7)
Daily mean °C (°F)	5.1 (41.2)	5.5 (41.9)	8.1 (46.6)	10.5 (50.9)	14.0 (57.2)	17.1 (62.8)	19.0 (66.2)	19.0 (66.2)	15.9 (60.6)	12.4 (54.3)	8.1 (46.6)	5.5 (41.9)	11.7 (53.1)
Mean daily minimum °C (°F)	2.1 (35.8)	1.7 (35.1)	3.4 (38.1)	5.0 (41.0)	8.5 (47.3)	11.3 (52.3)	12.9 (55.2)	12.7 (54.9)	10.0 (50.0)	8.1 (46.6)	4.6 (40.3)	2.3 (36.1)	6.9 (44.4)
Record low °C (°F)	−15.9 (3.4)	−14.0 (6.8)	−10.8 (12.6)	−5.9 (21.4)	−3.5 (25.7)	0.7 (33.3)	4.0 (39.2)	2.9 (37.2)	−0.5 (31.1)	−4.5 (23.9)	−8.4 (16.9)	−16.0 (3.2)	−16.0 (3.2)
Average precipitation mm (inches)	81.3 (3.20)	65.5 (2.58)	57.9 (2.28)	55.5 (2.19)	60.7 (2.39)	56.2 (2.21)	52.7 (2.07)	51.8 (2.04)	64.1 (2.52)	80.1 (3.15)	83.9 (3.30)	94.4 (3.72)	804.1 (31.66)
Average precipitation days (≥ 1.0 mm)	13.3	10.6	10.0	9.9	9.4	7.9	7.6	7.7	8.1	10.9	12.5	13.7	121.6
Source: Meteociel

== See also ==
- Communes of the Mayenne department
