= Évron Abbey =

Abbey in Mayenne, France

Coordinates: 48.156°N 0.404°W

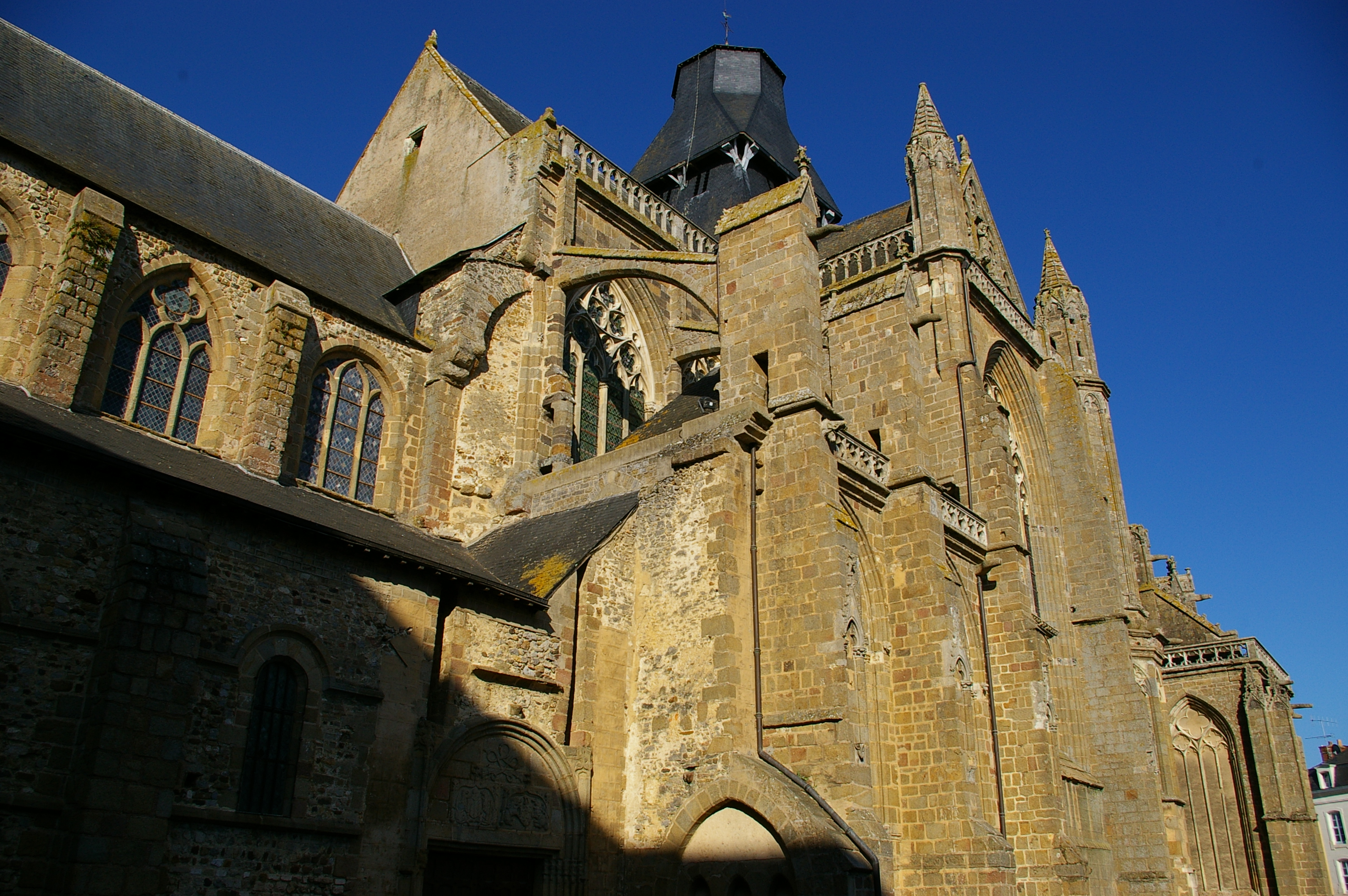
Former church of Évron Abbey, the Basilica of Notre-Dame de l'Épine

Évron Abbey (French: Abbaye Notre-Dame d'Évron) is a former Benedictine abbey in Évron, in the Mayenne department in France. Its foundation is ascribed to the 7th century. It was dissolved in 1791 during the French Revolution. The former monastic church survived intact, and is now the Basilica of Notre-Dame de l'Épine ("Our Lady of the Thorn").

The abbey is now the seat of the Community of Saint Martin, an association of priests and deacons living their apostolate in community.

== Bibliography ==
- Abbé Angot, Le restaurateur de l'abbaye d'Évron, in "Bulletin de la Commission historique et archéologique de la Mayenne", 1913, No 29, pp. 443–493
- Abbé Augustin Ceuneau, L'église et l'abbaye bénédictines de Notre-Dame d'Évron. Évron: E. Letellier, 1931
- Eugène Lefèvre-Pontalis (1903). "L'Église abbatiale d'Évron (Mayenne)". Revue historique et archéologique du Maine. Mamers / Le Mans: G. Fleury & A. Dangin / A. de Saint-Denis. pp. 5–63.
