= Revol Porcelaine =

- Industry: Porcelain Manufacturing
- Founded: 1768; 258 years ago
- Founder: François Revol; Joseph-Marie
- Headquarters: France
- Website: revol1768.com

Revol Porcelaine S.A. was founded in 1768 by brothers Joseph-Marie and François Revol in France's Rhone Valley, where they discovered a deposit of white kaolin. They established a factory in Ponsas and began manufacturing a hard-wearing white stoneware, later establishing operations in Saint-Uze. Revol later developed a porcelain body that forms the basis for Revol ceramic products, called "culinary porcelain" (la porcelaine culinaire) by the company.

== Present-day ==
Revol Porcelaine remains a family-run company after 9 generations, with Olivier Passot as the Managing Director. The company is headquartered in Saint-Uze, France, where it employs 185 people and maintains 16,500 sq. m. of factory space. The facility produces 4 million units a year, exporting to 80 countries.

Revol porcelain for the hotel and restaurant industry and retail is distributed in the United States by Revol USA.
