= Le Grand-Serre =

- Commune
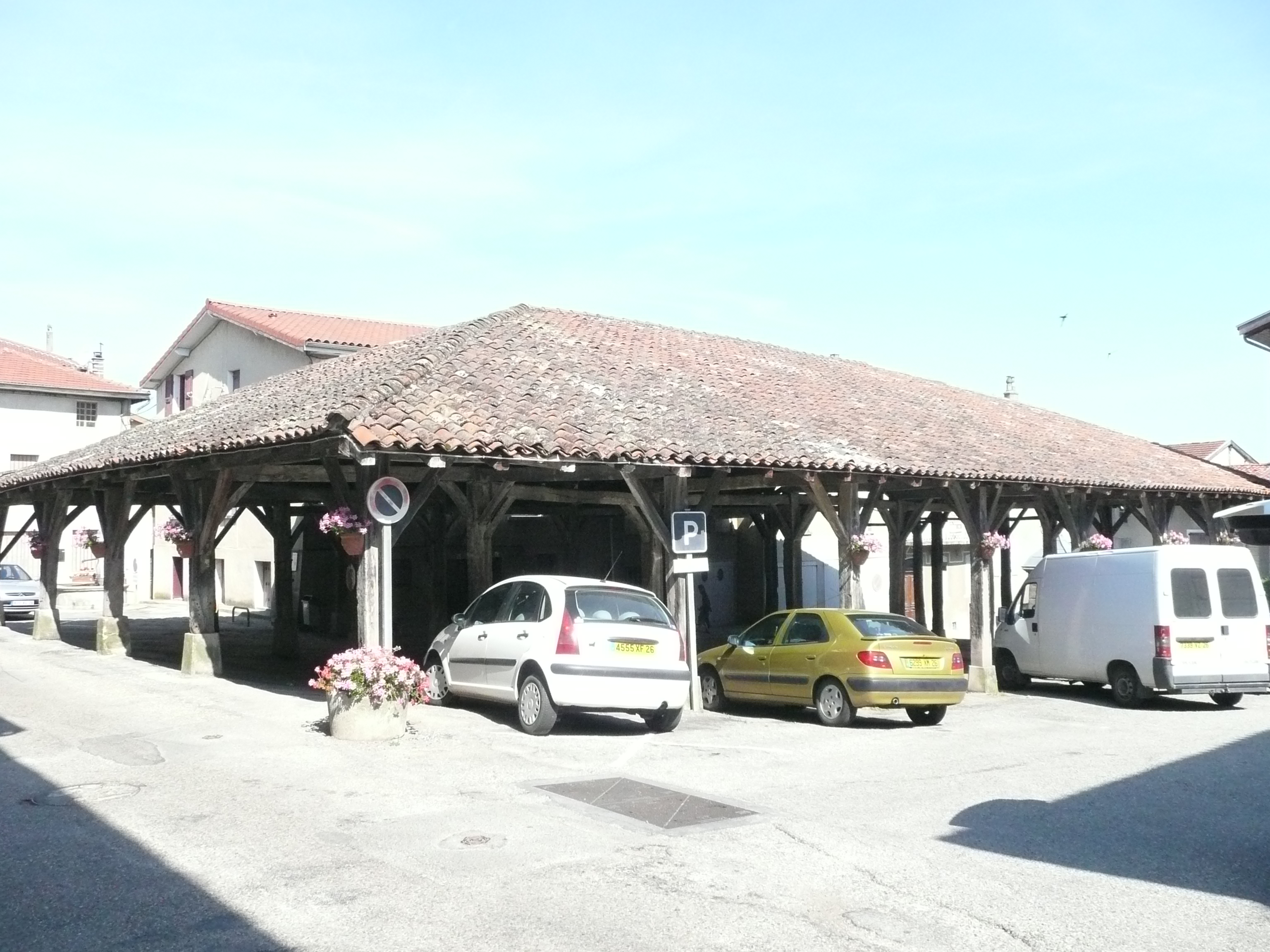
- Medieval hall
- Location of Le Grand-Serre
- Location within France Location within Auvergne-Rhône-Alpes
- Coordinates: 45°16′14″N 5°06′14″E
- Country: France
- Region: Auvergne-Rhône-Alpes
- Department: Drôme
- Arrondissement: Valence
- Canton: Drôme des collines

Government
  - Mayor (2020–2026): Agnès Genthon
- Area^{1}: 24.74 km^{2} (9.55 sq mi)
- Elevation: 480 m (1,570 ft)
- Highest elevation: 519 m (1,703 ft)
- Lowest elevation: 329 m (1,079 ft)
- Population (2023): 973
  - Density: 39.3/km^{2} (102/sq mi)
- Time zone: UTC+01:00 (CET)
  - Summer (DST): UTC+02:00 (CEST)
- INSEE/Postal code: 26143 /26530
- ^{1} French Land Register data, which excludes lakes, ponds, glaciers > 1 km^{2} (0.386 sq mi or 247 acres) and river estuaries.

Le Grand-Serre (French pronunciation: [lə ɡʁɑ̃ sɛʁ]; Arpitan: Sèrra) is a commune in the Drôme department in southeastern France.

== Geography ==
The Galaure flows west through the northern part of the commune, then forms part of its north-western border.

The nearest communes are Marcollin and Saint-Clair-sur-Galaure, both in the Isère department.

== Population ==
Historical population
Year	Pop.	±% p.a.
1968	800	—
1975	702	−1.85%
1982	721	+0.38%
1990	722	+0.02%
1999	735	+0.20%
2007	776	+0.68%
2012	881	+2.57%
2017	912	+0.69%
2023	973	+1.08%
Source: INSEE

== Education ==
2 schools are located in the commune, a primary school and a high school.

== Events ==
- Each year during summer is organized a party in the village called "La Vogue". Every village in Drôme does his own party that lasts 2 or 3 days.

== See also ==
- Communes of the Drôme department
