= La Motte-de-Galaure =

- Part of Saint-Jean-de-Galaure
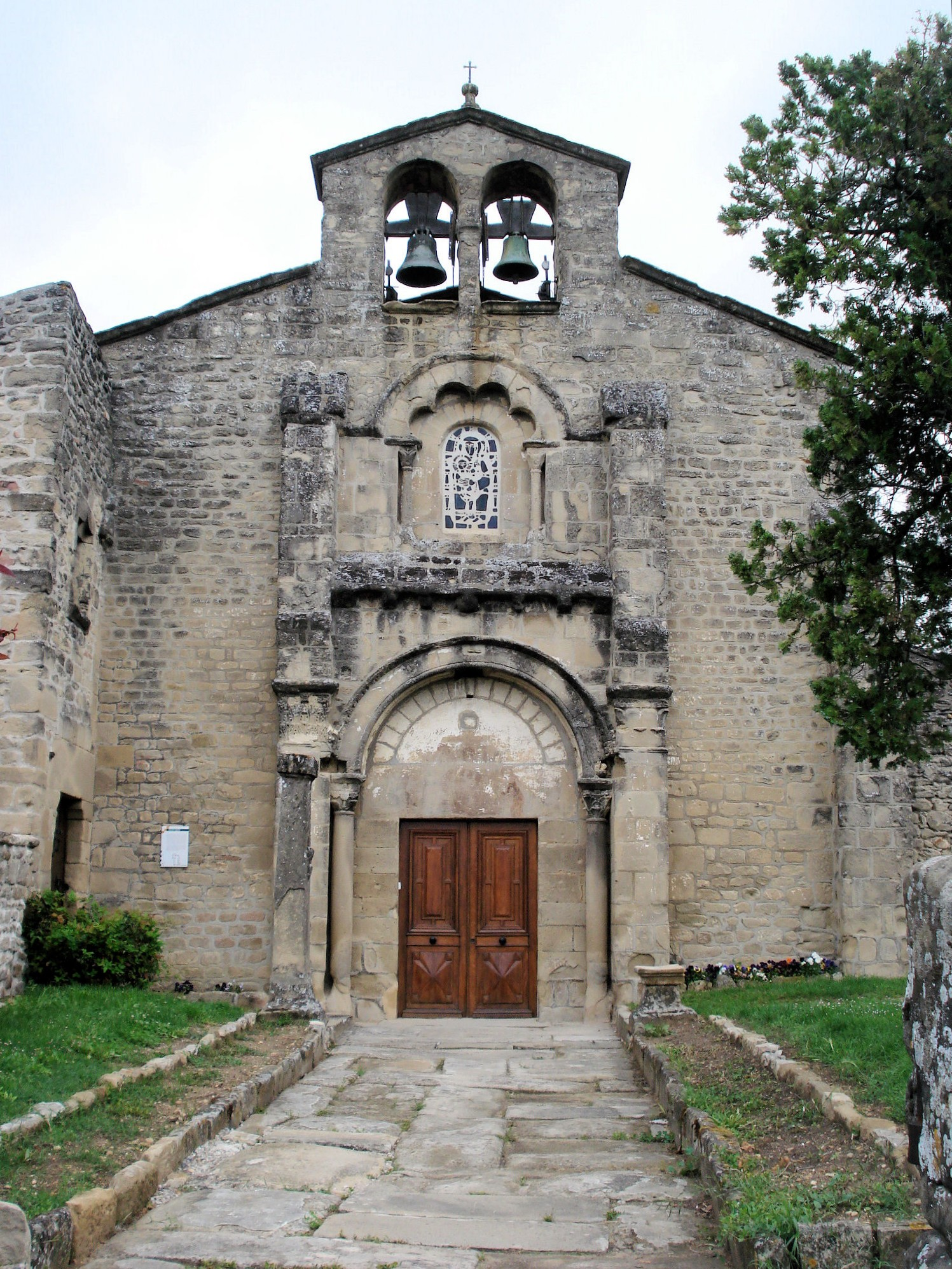
- The church of Sainte-Agnes, in La Motte-de-Galaure
- Location of La Motte-de-Galaure
- Location within France Location within Auvergne-Rhône-Alpes
- Coordinates: 45°11′51″N 4°54′23″E
- Country: France
- Region: Auvergne-Rhône-Alpes
- Department: Drôme
- Arrondissement: Valence
- Canton: Saint-Vallier
- Commune: Saint-Jean-de-Galaure
- Area^{1}: 7.73 km^{2} (2.98 sq mi)
- Elevation: 220 m (720 ft)
- Highest elevation: 363 m (1,191 ft)
- Lowest elevation: 184 m (604 ft)
- Population (2023): 769
  - Density: 99.5/km^{2} (258/sq mi)
- Time zone: UTC+01:00 (CET)
  - Summer (DST): UTC+02:00 (CEST)
- Postal code: 26240
- ^{1} French Land Register data, which excludes lakes, ponds, glaciers > 1 km^{2} (0.386 sq mi or 247 acres) and river estuaries.

La Motte-de-Galaure (French pronunciation: [la mɔt də ɡalɔʁ]) is a former commune in the Drôme department in southeastern France. On 1 January 2022, it was merged into the new commune of Saint-Jean-de-Galaure.

== Geography ==
The Galaure flows southwest through the southern part of the commune.

== See also ==
- Communes of the Drôme department
