= Miribel =

Miribel is the name or part of the name of several communes in France:

- Miribel, Ain
- Miribel, Drôme
- Miribel-Lanchâtre, Isère département
- Miribel-les-Échelles, Isère département
