= Mureils =

- Part of Saint-Jean-de-Galaure
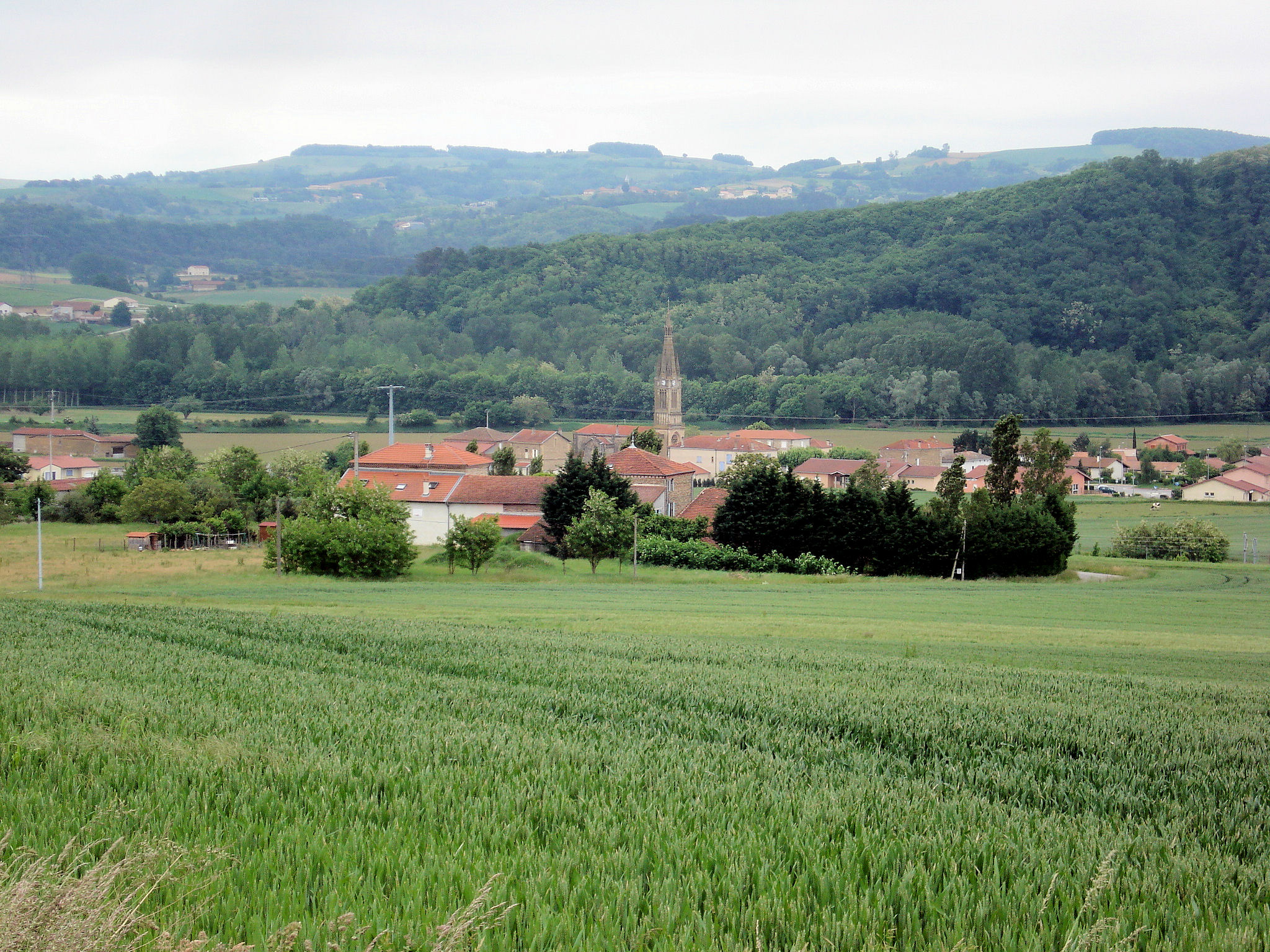
- A general view of Mureils
- Location of Mureils
- Location within France Location within Auvergne-Rhône-Alpes
- Coordinates: 45°12′35″N 4°55′51″E
- Country: France
- Region: Auvergne-Rhône-Alpes
- Department: Drôme
- Arrondissement: Valence
- Canton: Saint-Vallier
- Commune: Saint-Jean-de-Galaure
- Area^{1}: 5.45 km^{2} (2.10 sq mi)
- Elevation: 225 m (738 ft)
- Highest elevation: 378 m (1,240 ft)
- Lowest elevation: 214 m (702 ft)
- Population (2023): 481
  - Density: 88.3/km^{2} (229/sq mi)
- Time zone: UTC+01:00 (CET)
  - Summer (DST): UTC+02:00 (CEST)
- Postal code: 26240
- ^{1} French Land Register data, which excludes lakes, ponds, glaciers > 1 km^{2} (0.386 sq mi or 247 acres) and river estuaries.

Mureils is a former commune in the Drôme department in southeastern France. On 1 January 2022, it was merged into the new commune of Saint-Jean-de-Galaure.

== Geography ==
The Galaure flows southwest through the southern part of the commune.

== See also ==
- Communes of the Drôme department
