= Galaure =

River in southeastern France

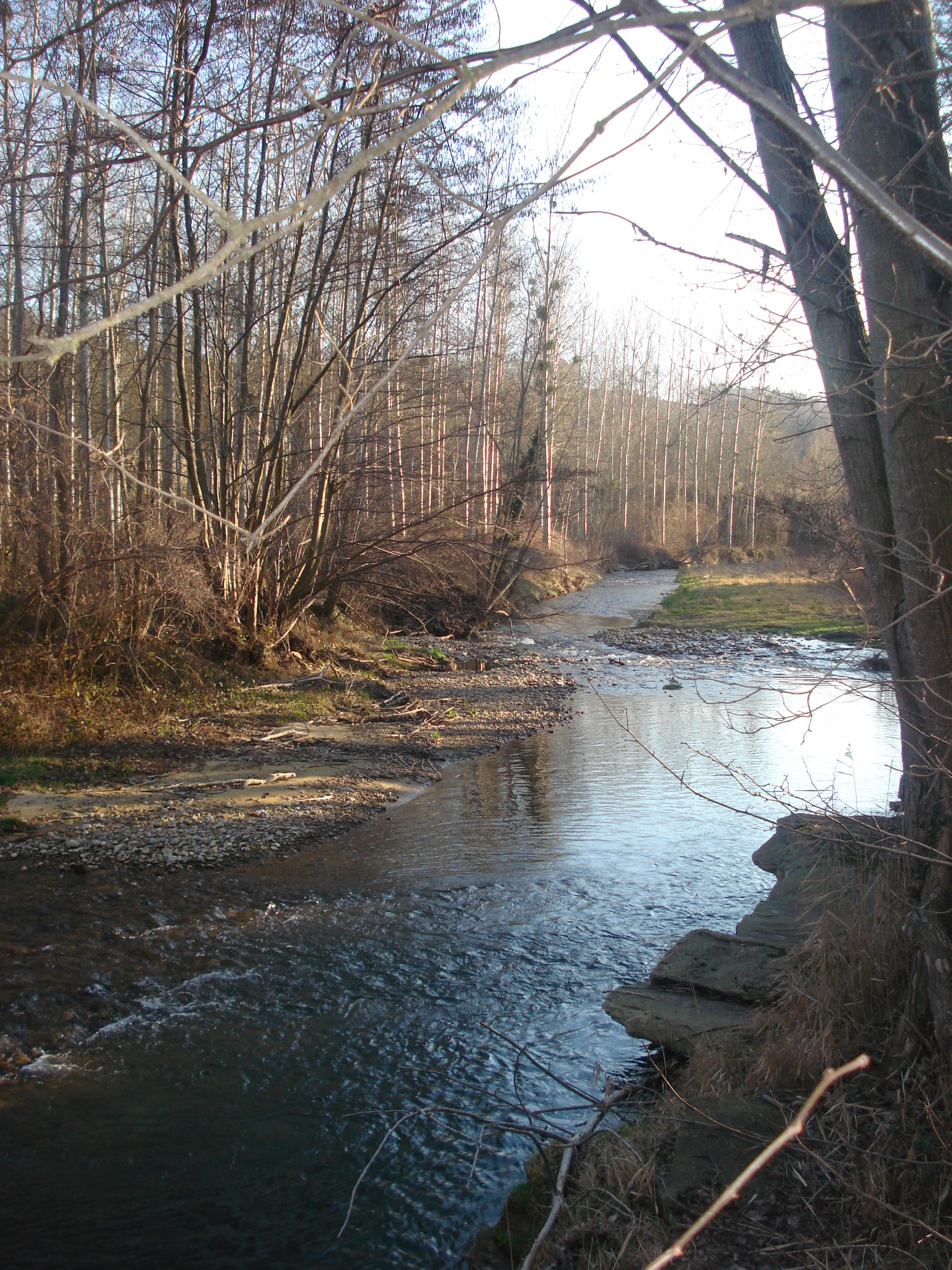

- Location within France Location within Auvergne-Rhône-Alpes

Location
- Country: France

Physical characteristics
- Source
  - location: Roybon
  - coordinates: 45°16′26″N 05°18′31″E
  - elevation: 635 m (2,083 ft)
- Mouth
  - location: Rhône
  - coordinates: 45°10′37″N 04°48′47″E
  - elevation: 125 m (410 ft)
- Length: 56.2 km (34.9 mi)
- Basin size: 232 km^{2} (90 sq mi)
- Discharge
  - average: 2.18 m^{3}/s (77 cu ft/s)

Basin features
- Progression: Rhône→ Mediterranean Sea

The Galaure (French pronunciation: [ɡalɔʁ]) is a 56.2 km (34.9 mi) long river in the Isère and Drôme departments in southeastern France. Its source is in Roybon. It flows generally west-southwest. It is a left tributary of the Rhône, into which it flows at Saint-Vallier.

== Departments and communes along its course ==
This list is ordered from source to mouth:

- Isère: Roybon, Saint-Pierre-de-Bressieux, Montfalcon,
- Drôme: Montrigaud,
- Isère:Saint-Clair-sur-Galaure,
- Drôme: Le Grand-Serre, Hauterives, Châteauneuf-de-Galaure, Mureils, La Motte-de-Galaure, Saint-Barthélemy-de-Vals, Saint-Uze, Saint-Vallier,
