= Saint-Bonnet-de-Valclérieux =

Saint-Bonnet-de-Valclérieux Sent-Bônèt-en-Vâlcllarês (Arpitan)
- Part of Valherbasse
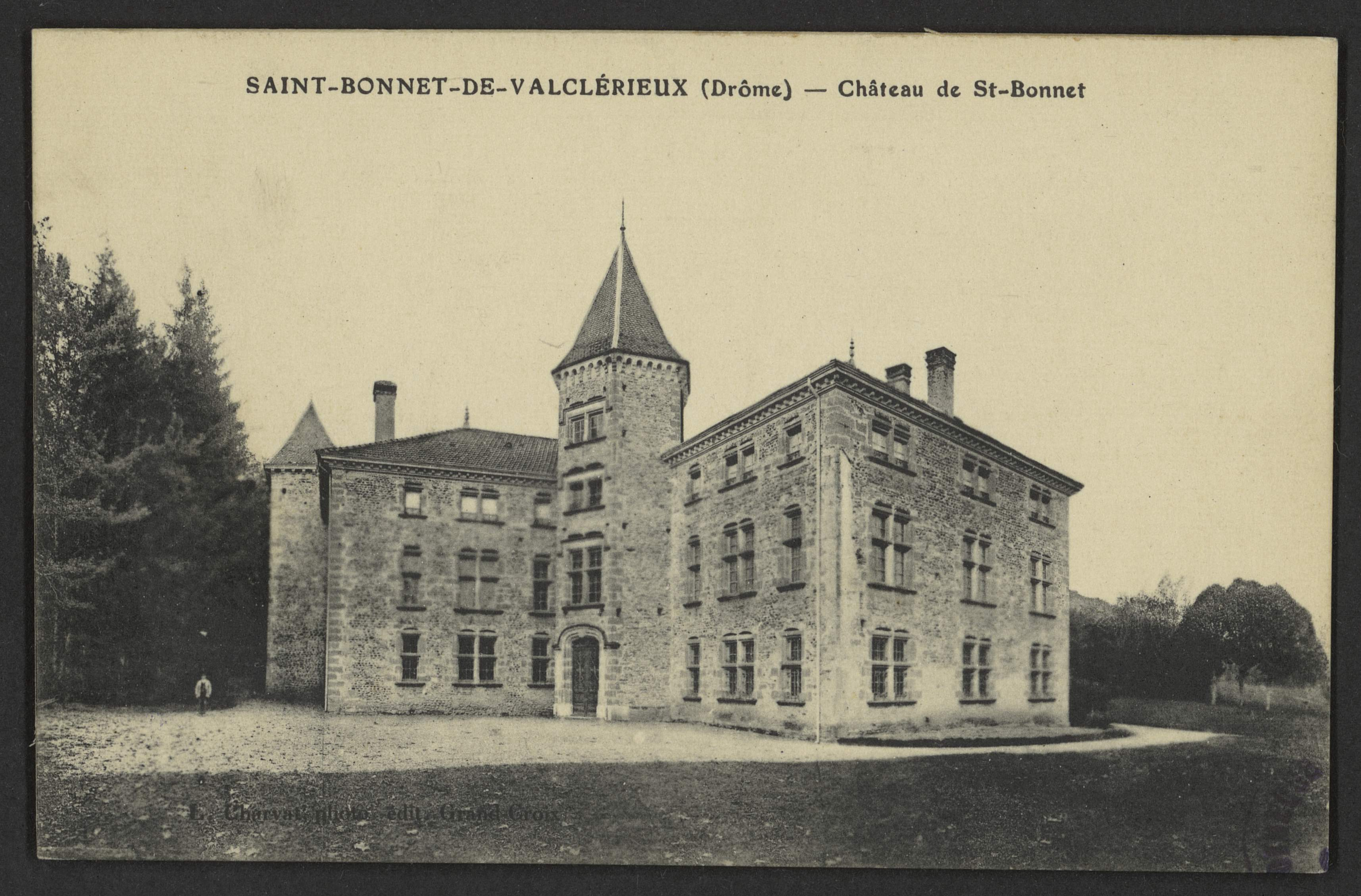
- Location of Saint-Bonnet-de-Valclérieux
- Location within France Location within Auvergne-Rhône-Alpes
- Coordinates: 45°11′46″N 5°08′37″E
- Country: France
- Region: Auvergne-Rhône-Alpes
- Department: Drôme
- Arrondissement: Valence
- Canton: Drôme des collines
- Commune: Valherbasse
- Area^{1}: 8.29 km^{2} (3.20 sq mi)
- Elevation: 450 m (1,480 ft)
- Highest elevation: 532 m (1,745 ft)
- Lowest elevation: 357 m (1,171 ft)
- Population (2023): 227
  - Density: 27.4/km^{2} (70.9/sq mi)
- Time zone: UTC+01:00 (CET)
  - Summer (DST): UTC+02:00 (CEST)
- Postal code: 26350
- ^{1} French Land Register data, which excludes lakes, ponds, glaciers > 1 km^{2} (0.386 sq mi or 247 acres) and river estuaries.

Saint-Bonnet-de-Valclérieux (French pronunciation: [sɛ̃ bɔnɛ də valkleʁjø]; Arpitan: Sent-Bônèt-en-Vâlcllarês) is a former commune in the Drôme department in the Auvergne-Rhône-Alpes region, southeastern France. The village of Saint-Bonnet-de-Valclérieux belongs to the district of Valence and the canton of Romans-sur-Isère 2nd Canton. The postal code of the village of Saint-Bonnet-de-Valclérieux is 26350 and its Insee code is 26297. The inhabitants of Saint-Bonnet-de-Valclérieux are called Saint-Bonnetaires in French.

On 1 January 2019, it was merged into the new commune Valherbasse.

== Geography ==
The average altitude of Saint-Bonnet-de-Valclérieux is approximately 405 meters. Its area is 8.29 km^{2}. Its latitude is 45.196 degrees North and its longitude is 5.143 degrees East. The towns and villages close to Saint-Bonnet-de-Valclérieux are: Miribel (26350) at 2.59 km, Montrigaud (26350) at 2.89 km, Saint-Laurent-d'Onay (26350) at 3.50 km, Montmiral (26750) at 4.59 km, Saint-Christophe-et-le-Laris (26350) at 5.79 km.

== See also ==
- Communes of the Drôme department
