= Fay-le-Clos =

- Commune
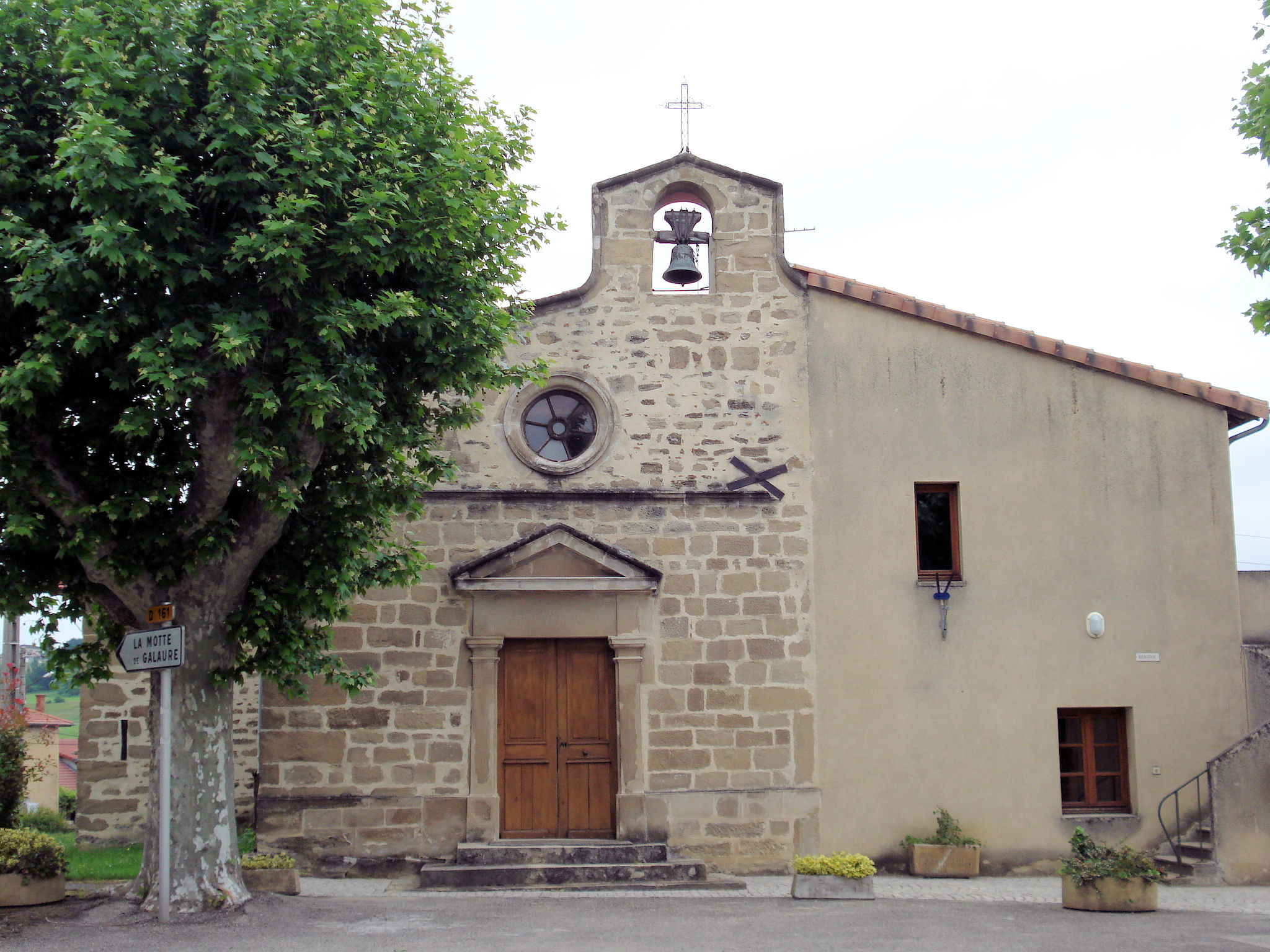
- The church of the village
- Location of Fay-le-Clos
- Location within France Location within Auvergne-Rhône-Alpes
- Coordinates: 45°12′51″N 4°54′24″E
- Country: France
- Region: Auvergne-Rhône-Alpes
- Department: Drôme
- Arrondissement: Valence
- Canton: Saint-Vallier
- Intercommunality: Porte de Dromardèche

Government
  - Mayor (2020–2026): Marie-Hélène Bonnet
- Area^{1}: 4.56 km^{2} (1.76 sq mi)
- Elevation: 224 m (735 ft)
- Highest elevation: 373 m (1,224 ft)
- Lowest elevation: 231 m (758 ft)
- Population (2023): 183
  - Density: 40.1/km^{2} (104/sq mi)
- Time zone: UTC+01:00 (CET)
  - Summer (DST): UTC+02:00 (CEST)
- INSEE/Postal code: 26133 /26240
- ^{1} French Land Register data, which excludes lakes, ponds, glaciers > 1 km^{2} (0.386 sq mi or 247 acres) and river estuaries.

Fay-le-Clos (French pronunciation: [fɛ lə klo]; Arpitan: Lo Fê-lo-Cllôs) is a commune in the Drôme department in the Auvergne-Rhône-Alpes region in southeastern France.

== Population ==
Historical population
Year	Pop.	±% p.a.
1968	159	—
1975	143	−1.50%
1982	144	+0.10%
1990	151	+0.60%
1999	169	+1.26%
2007	155	−1.08%
2012	163	+1.01%
2017	163	+0.00%
2023	183	+1.95%
Source: INSEE

== See also ==
- Communes of the Drôme department
