= Laveyron =

- Commune
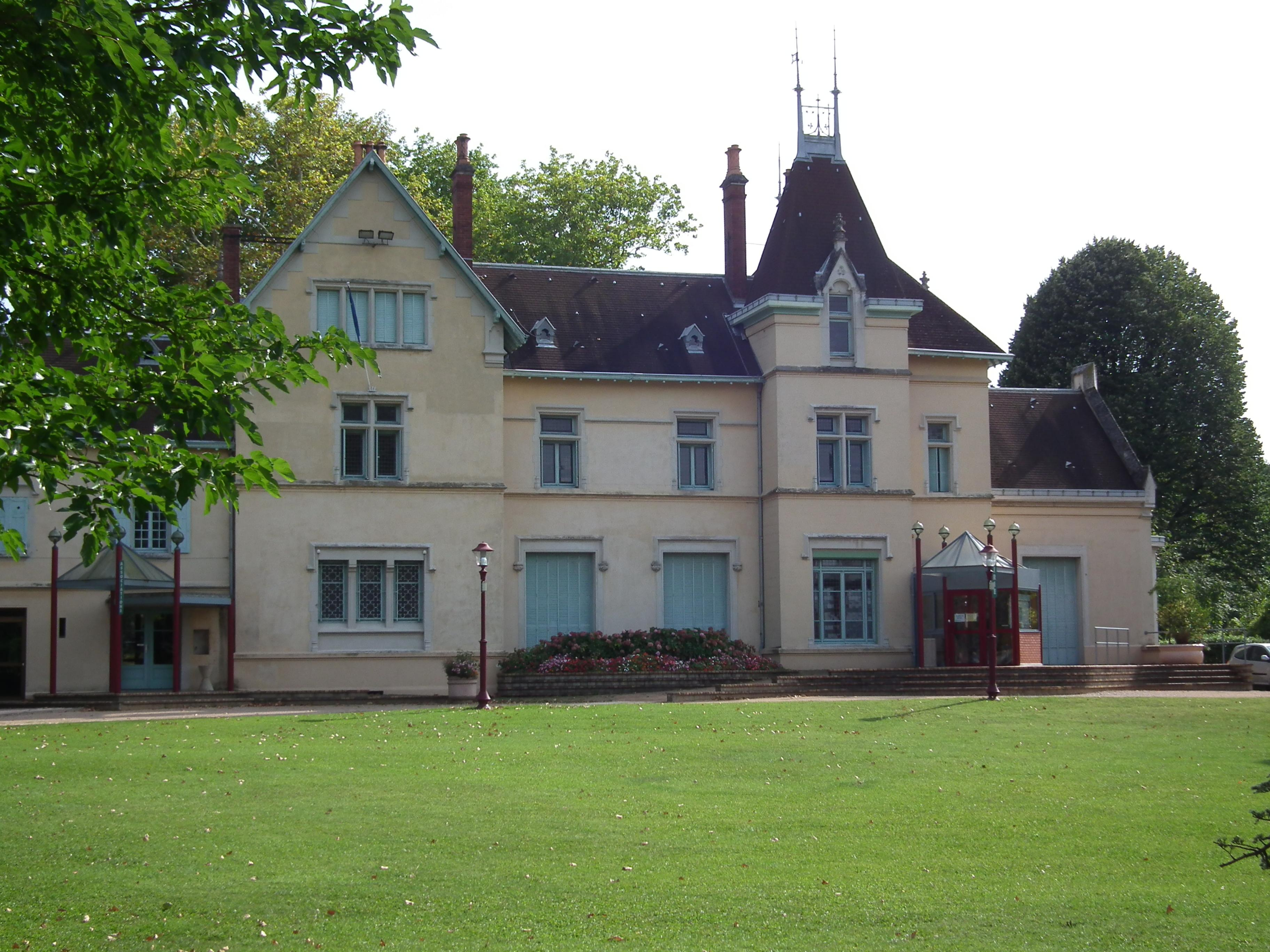
- The town hall of Laveyron
- Location of Laveyron
- Location within France Location within Auvergne-Rhône-Alpes
- Coordinates: 45°12′39″N 4°49′13″E
- Country: France
- Region: Auvergne-Rhône-Alpes
- Department: Drôme
- Arrondissement: Valence
- Canton: Saint-Vallier

Government
  - Mayor (2020–2026): Sylvie Perot
- Area^{1}: 5.32 km^{2} (2.05 sq mi)
- Elevation: 188 m (617 ft)
- Highest elevation: 364 m (1,194 ft)
- Lowest elevation: 128 m (420 ft)
- Population (2023): 1,253
  - Density: 236/km^{2} (610/sq mi)
- Time zone: UTC+01:00 (CET)
  - Summer (DST): UTC+02:00 (CEST)
- INSEE/Postal code: 26160 /26240
- ^{1} French Land Register data, which excludes lakes, ponds, glaciers > 1 km^{2} (0.386 sq mi or 247 acres) and river estuaries.

Laveyron (French pronunciation: [laveʁɔ̃]; Arpitan: Lavêron) is a commune in the Drôme department in southeastern France.

== Population ==
Historical population
Year	Pop.	±% p.a.
1968	601	—
1975	757	+3.35%
1982	766	+0.17%
1990	795	+0.47%
1999	882	+1.16%
2007	918	+0.50%
2012	1,001	+1.75%
2017	1,187	+3.47%
2023	1,253	+0.91%
Source: INSEE

== See also ==
- Communes of the Drôme department
