= Saint-Barthélemy-de-Vals =

- Commune
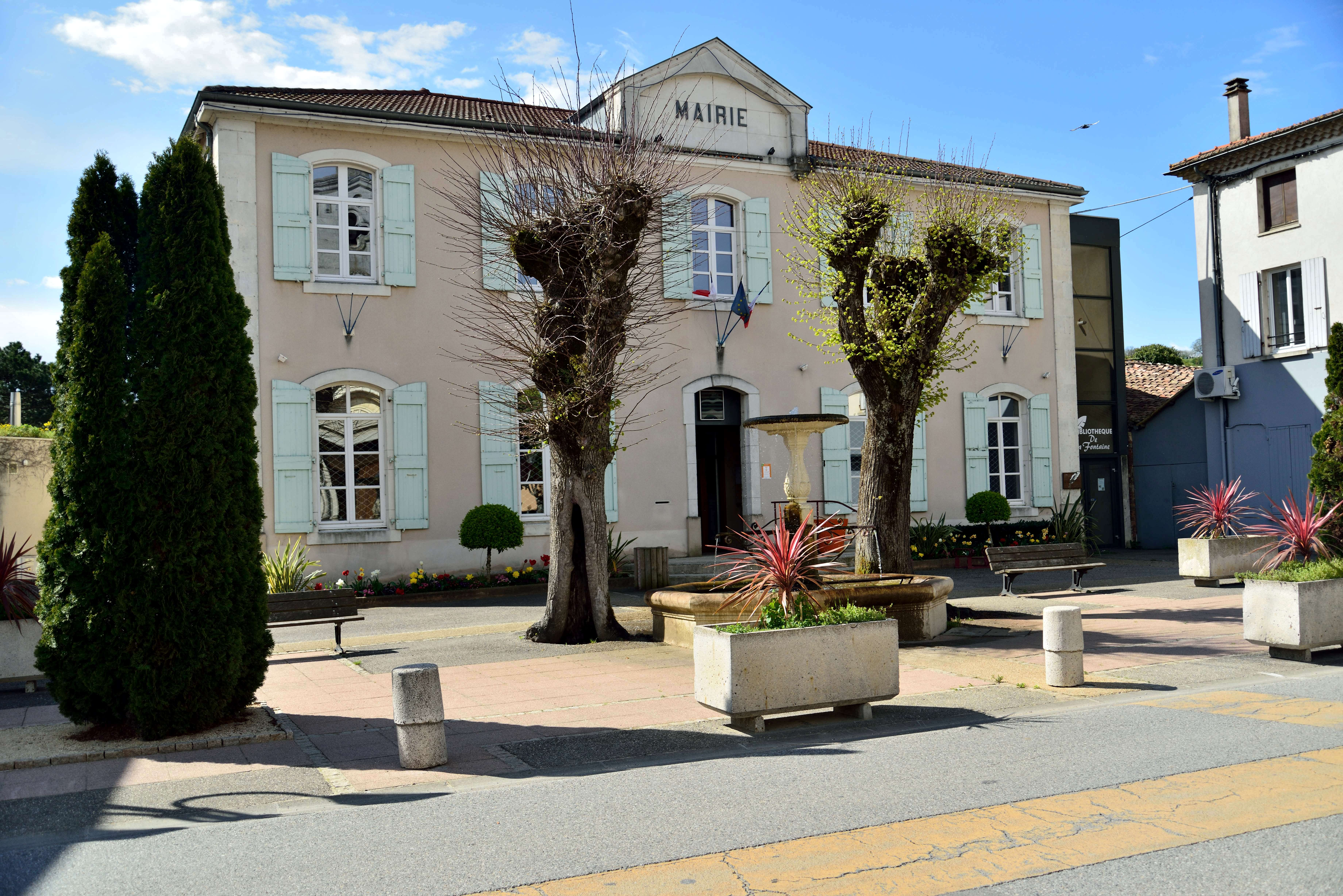
- The town hall of Saint-Barthélemy-de-Vals
- Location of Saint-Barthélemy-de-Vals
- Location within France Location within Auvergne-Rhône-Alpes
- Coordinates: 45°10′12″N 4°52′21″E
- Country: France
- Region: Auvergne-Rhône-Alpes
- Department: Drôme
- Arrondissement: Valence
- Canton: Saint-Vallier

Government
  - Mayor (2020–2026): Ludwig Montagne
- Area^{1}: 20.27 km^{2} (7.83 sq mi)
- Elevation: 172 m (564 ft)
- Highest elevation: 355 m (1,165 ft)
- Lowest elevation: 138 m (453 ft)
- Population (2023): 1,895
  - Density: 93.49/km^{2} (242.1/sq mi)
- Time zone: UTC+01:00 (CET)
  - Summer (DST): UTC+02:00 (CEST)
- INSEE/Postal code: 26295 /26240
- ^{1} French Land Register data, which excludes lakes, ponds, glaciers > 1 km^{2} (0.386 sq mi or 247 acres) and river estuaries.

Saint-Barthélemy-de-Vals (French pronunciation: [sɛ̃ baʁtelemi də vals]) is a commune in the Drôme department in southeastern France.

== Geography ==
The Galaure forms most of the commune's northern border.

== Population ==
Historical population
Year	Pop.	±% p.a.
1968	1,153	—
1975	1,164	+0.14%
1982	1,365	+2.30%
1990	1,637	+2.30%
1999	1,625	−0.08%
2007	1,795	+1.25%
2012	1,904	+1.19%
2017	1,869	−0.37%
2023	1,895	+0.23%
Source: INSEE

== See also ==
- Communes of the Drôme department
