= Saint-Jean-de-Galaure =

- Commune
- Location of Saint-Jean-de-Galaure
- Location within France Location within Auvergne-Rhône-Alpes
- Coordinates: 45°11′51″N 4°54′23″E
- Country: France
- Region: Auvergne-Rhône-Alpes
- Department: Drôme
- Arrondissement: Valence
- Canton: Saint-Vallier
- Intercommunality: Porte de DrômArdèche

Government
  - Mayor (2022–2026): Laurence Perez
- Area^{1}: 13.18 km^{2} (5.09 sq mi)
- Highest elevation: 378 m (1,240 ft)
- Lowest elevation: 184 m (604 ft)
- Population (2023): 1,250
  - Density: 94.8/km^{2} (246/sq mi)
- Time zone: UTC+01:00 (CET)
  - Summer (DST): UTC+02:00 (CEST)
- INSEE/Postal code: 26216 /26240
- ^{1} French Land Register data, which excludes lakes, ponds, glaciers > 1 km^{2} (0.386 sq mi or 247 acres) and river estuaries.

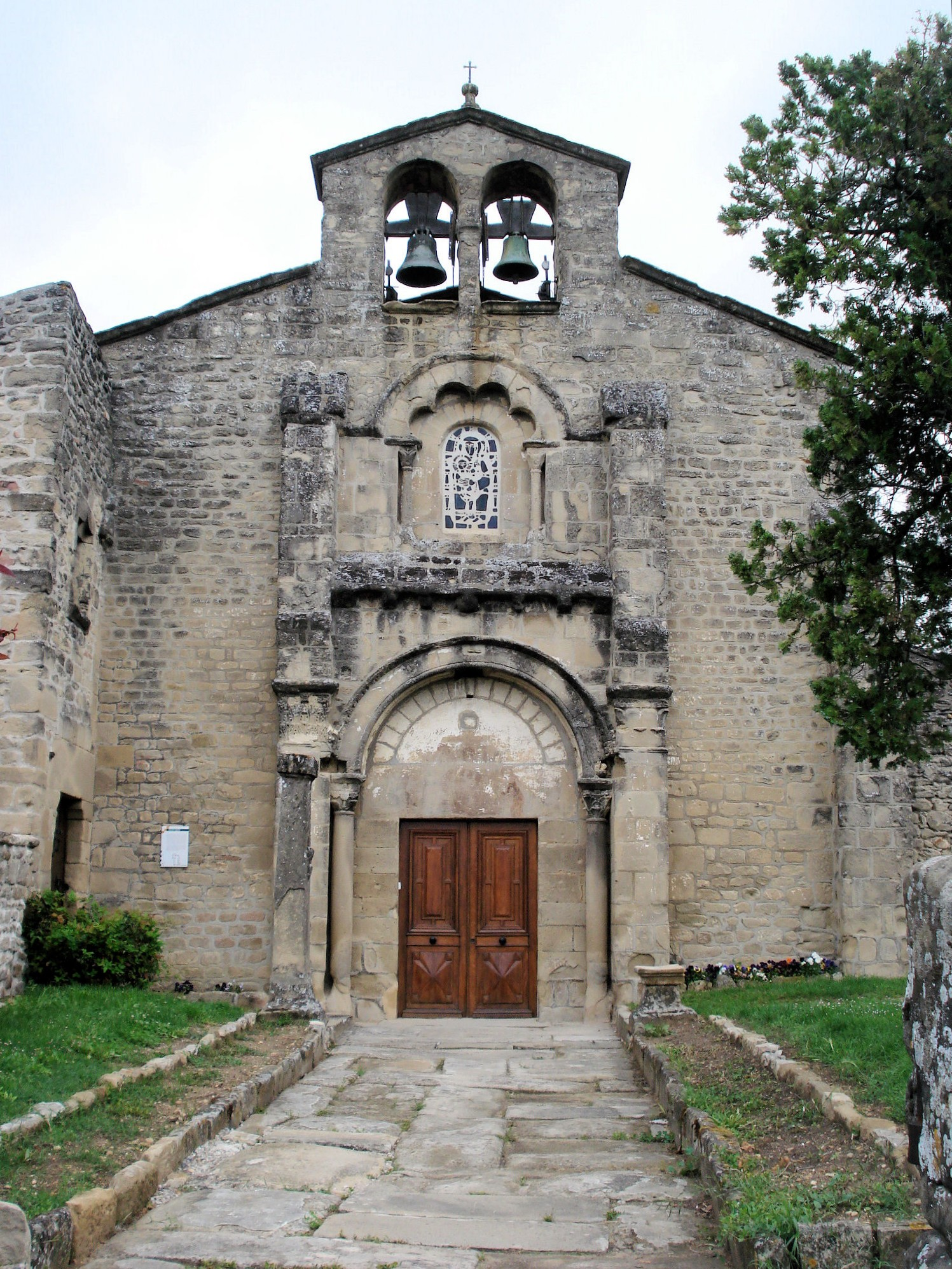
Motte-de-Galaure

Saint-Jean-de-Galaure (French pronunciation: [sɛ̃ ʒɑ̃ də ɡalɔʁ]) is a commune in the Drôme department in Auvergne-Rhône-Alpes in southeastern France. It is the result of the merger, on 1 January 2022, of the communes of La Motte-de-Galaure and Mureils.

== See also ==
- Communes of the Drôme department
