= Roybon =

- Commune
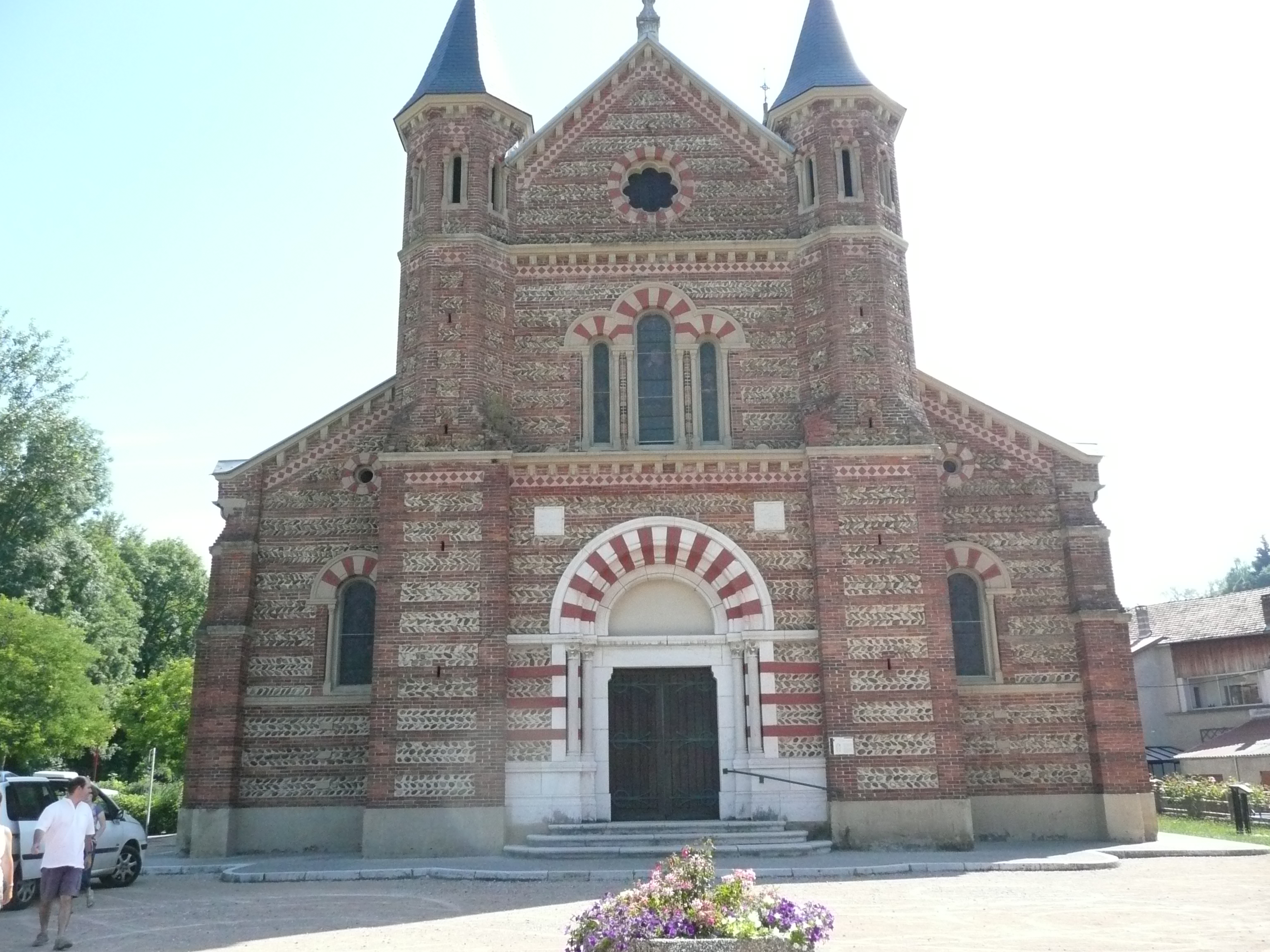
- The church of Roybon

- Coat of arms
- Location of Roybon
- Location within France Location within Auvergne-Rhône-Alpes
- Coordinates: 45°15′34″N 5°14′42″E
- Country: France
- Region: Auvergne-Rhône-Alpes
- Department: Isère
- Arrondissement: Vienne
- Canton: Bièvre

Government
  - Mayor (2020–2026): Serge Perraud
- Area^{1}: 67.31 km^{2} (25.99 sq mi)
- Elevation: 500 m (1,600 ft)
- Highest elevation: 729 m (2,392 ft)
- Lowest elevation: 436 m (1,430 ft)
- Population (2023): 1,091
  - Density: 16.21/km^{2} (41.98/sq mi)
- Time zone: UTC+01:00 (CET)
  - Summer (DST): UTC+02:00 (CEST)
- INSEE/Postal code: 38347 /38940
- ^{1} French Land Register data, which excludes lakes, ponds, glaciers > 1 km^{2} (0.386 sq mi or 247 acres) and river estuaries.

Roybon (French pronunciation: [ʁwa.bɔ̃]) is a commune in the Isère department in southeastern France.

== Geography ==
The river Galaure has its source in the commune.

== Population ==
Historical population
| Year | Pop. | ±% p.a. |
|---|---|---|
| 1968 | 1,487 | — |
| 1975 | 1,274 | −2.18% |
| 1982 | 1,220 | −0.62% |
| 1990 | 1,269 | +0.49% |
| 1999 | 1,231 | −0.34% |
| 2007 | 1,284 | +0.53% |
| 2012 | 1,296 | +0.19% |
| 2017 | 1,157 | −2.24% |
| 2023 | 1,091 | −0.97% |
Source: INSEE

== See also ==
- Communes of the Isère department
