= Montfalcon =

- Commune
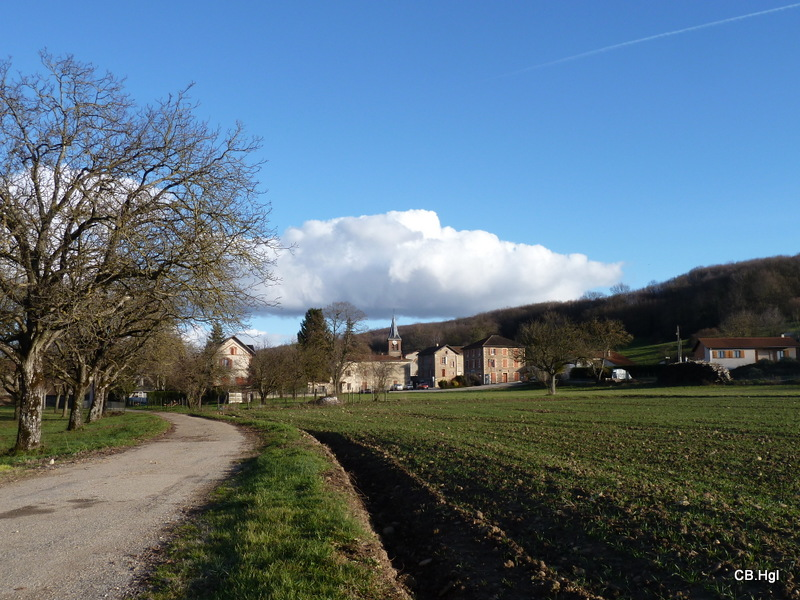
- The village of Montfalcon
- Location of Montfalcon
- Location within France Location within Auvergne-Rhône-Alpes
- Coordinates: 45°15′19″N 5°10′21″E
- Country: France
- Region: Auvergne-Rhône-Alpes
- Department: Isère
- Arrondissement: Vienne
- Canton: Bièvre

Government
  - Mayor (2020–2026): Frédéric Bret
- Area^{1}: 5.82 km^{2} (2.25 sq mi)
- Highest elevation: 552 m (1,811 ft)
- Lowest elevation: 410 m (1,350 ft)
- Population (2023): 127
  - Density: 21.8/km^{2} (56.5/sq mi)
- Time zone: UTC+01:00 (CET)
  - Summer (DST): UTC+02:00 (CEST)
- INSEE/Postal code: 38255 /38940
- ^{1} French Land Register data, which excludes lakes, ponds, glaciers > 1 km^{2} (0.386 sq mi or 247 acres) and river estuaries.

Montfalcon (French pronunciation: [mɔ̃falkɔ̃]) is a commune in the Isère department in southeastern France.

== Geography ==
The village lies on the left bank of the Galaure, which flows west through the southern part of the commune.

== Population ==
Historical population
Year	Pop.	±% p.a.
1968	112	—
1975	102	−1.33%
1982	125	+2.95%
1990	103	−2.39%
1999	99	−0.44%
2007	126	+3.06%
2012	121	−0.81%
2017	133	+1.91%
2023	127	−0.77%
Source: INSEE

== See also ==
- Communes of the Isère department
