= Saint-Pierre-de-Bressieux =

- Commune
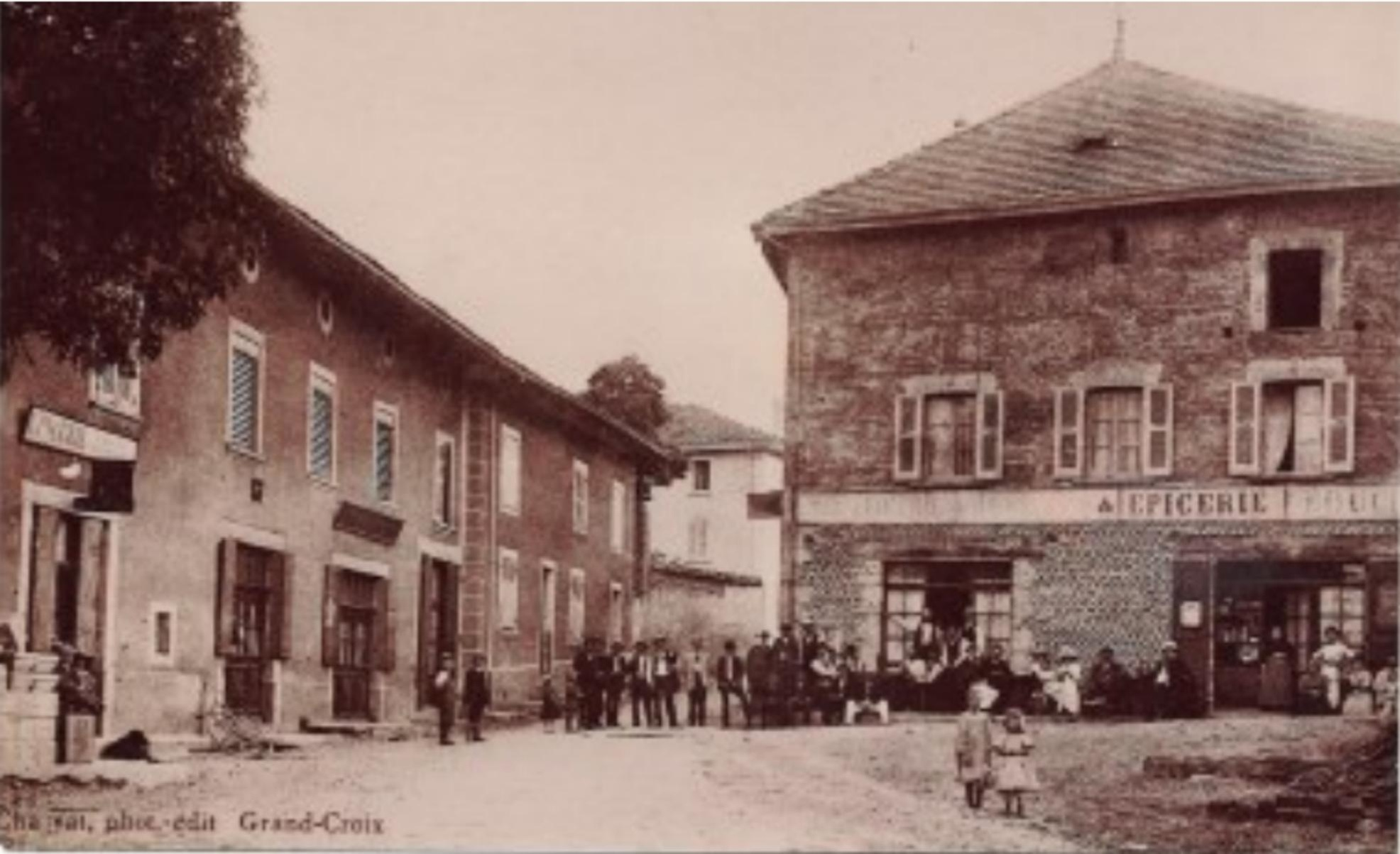
- Saint-Pierre-de-Bressieux at the start of the 20th century
- Location of Saint-Pierre-de-Bressieux
- Location within France Location within Auvergne-Rhône-Alpes
- Coordinates: 45°18′58″N 5°17′10″E
- Country: France
- Region: Auvergne-Rhône-Alpes
- Department: Isère
- Arrondissement: Vienne
- Canton: Bièvre
- Intercommunality: Bièvre Isère

Government
  - Mayor (2020–2026): Henri Faure
- Area^{1}: 23.08 km^{2} (8.91 sq mi)
- Elevation: 430 m (1,410 ft)
- Highest elevation: 723 m (2,372 ft)
- Lowest elevation: 378 m (1,240 ft)
- Population (2023): 786
  - Density: 34.1/km^{2} (88.2/sq mi)
- Time zone: UTC+01:00 (CET)
  - Summer (DST): UTC+02:00 (CEST)
- INSEE/Postal code: 38440 /38870
- ^{1} French Land Register data, which excludes lakes, ponds, glaciers > 1 km^{2} (0.386 sq mi or 247 acres) and river estuaries.

Saint-Pierre-de-Bressieux (French pronunciation: [sɛ̃ pjɛʁ də bʁɛsjø], literally Saint-Pierre of Bressieux) is a commune in the Isère department in southeastern France.

== Geography ==
The Galaure forms part of the commune's southern border.

== Population ==
Historical population
Year	Pop.	±% p.a.
1968	543	—
1975	508	−0.95%
1982	592	+2.21%
1990	621	+0.60%
1999	627	+0.11%
2007	681	+1.04%
2012	733	+1.48%
2017	761	+0.75%
2023	786	+0.54%
Source: INSEE

== See also ==
- Communes of the Isère department
