= Montrigaud =

- Part of Valherbasse
- Location of Montrigaud
- Location within France Location within Auvergne-Rhône-Alpes
- Coordinates: 45°13′11″N 5°07′55″E
- Country: France
- Region: Auvergne-Rhône-Alpes
- Department: Drôme
- Arrondissement: Valence
- Canton: Drôme des collines
- Commune: Valherbasse
- Area^{1}: 28.73 km^{2} (11.09 sq mi)
- Elevation: 462 m (1,516 ft)
- Highest elevation: 582 m (1,909 ft)
- Lowest elevation: 359 m (1,178 ft)
- Population (2023): 486
  - Density: 16.9/km^{2} (43.8/sq mi)
- Time zone: UTC+01:00 (CET)
  - Summer (DST): UTC+02:00 (CEST)
- Postal code: 26350
- ^{1} French Land Register data, which excludes lakes, ponds, glaciers > 1 km^{2} (0.386 sq mi or 247 acres) and river estuaries.

Montrigaud (French pronunciation: [mɔ̃ʁiɡo]; Arpitan: Mont-Regôd) is a former commune in the Drôme department in southeastern France. On 1 January 2019, it was merged into the new commune Valherbasse.

== Geography ==
The Galaure forms part of the commune's northern border.

== See also ==
- Communes of the Drôme department
