= Valherbasse =

Commune in Auvergne-Rhône-Alpes, France

- Commune
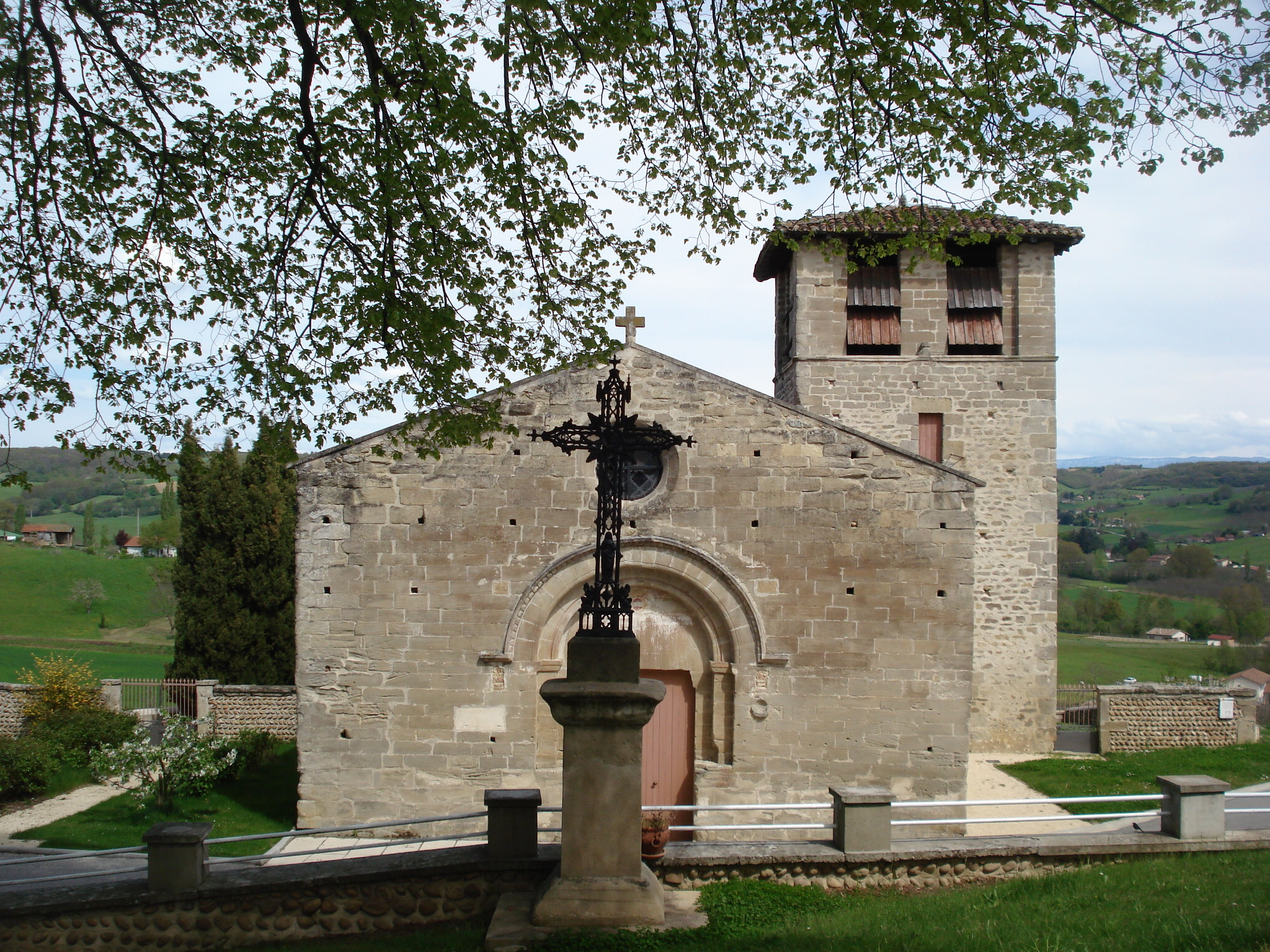
- The church of Saint-Sever in Miribel
- Location of Valherbasse
- Location within France Location within Auvergne-Rhône-Alpes
- Coordinates: 45°13′11″N 5°07′55″E
- Country: France
- Region: Auvergne-Rhône-Alpes
- Department: Drôme
- Arrondissement: Valence
- Canton: Drôme des collines
- Intercommunality: CA Valence Romans Agglo

Government
  - Mayor (2020–2026): Jean-Louis Vassy
- Area^{1}: 43.57 km^{2} (16.82 sq mi)
- Highest elevation: 582 m (1,909 ft)
- Lowest elevation: 326 m (1,070 ft)
- Population (2023): 1,005
  - Density: 23.07/km^{2} (59.74/sq mi)
- Time zone: UTC+01:00 (CET)
  - Summer (DST): UTC+02:00 (CEST)
- INSEE/Postal code: 26210 /26350
- ^{1} French Land Register data, which excludes lakes, ponds, glaciers > 1 km^{2} (0.386 sq mi or 247 acres) and river estuaries.

Valherbasse (French pronunciation: [valɛʁbas]) is a commune in the Drôme department in southeastern France. It was established on 1 January 2019 by merger of the former communes of Montrigaud (the seat), Miribel and Saint-Bonnet-de-Valclérieux.

== See also ==
- Communes of the Drôme department
