= Ponsas =

- Commune
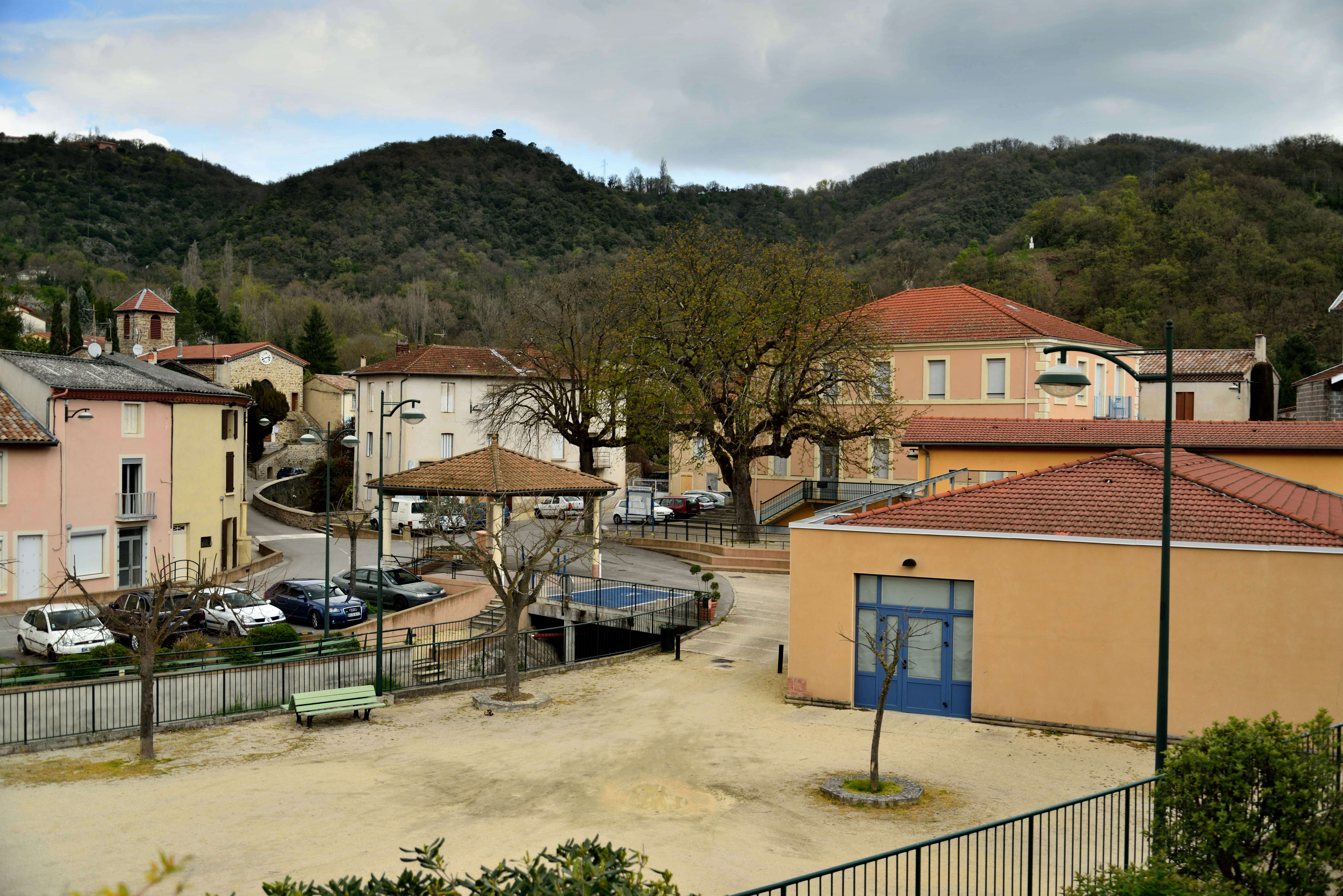
- A general view of Ponsas
- Location of Ponsas
- Location within France Location within Auvergne-Rhône-Alpes
- Coordinates: 45°09′37″N 4°50′16″E
- Country: France
- Region: Auvergne-Rhône-Alpes
- Department: Drôme
- Arrondissement: Valence
- Canton: Saint-Vallier

Government
  - Mayor (2020–2026): Marie-Christine Prot
- Area^{1}: 2.71 km^{2} (1.05 sq mi)
- Elevation: 120 m (390 ft)
- Highest elevation: 340 m (1,120 ft)
- Lowest elevation: 132 m (433 ft)
- Population (2023): 523
  - Density: 193/km^{2} (500/sq mi)
- Time zone: UTC+01:00 (CET)
  - Summer (DST): UTC+02:00 (CEST)
- INSEE/Postal code: 26247 /26240
- ^{1} French Land Register data, which excludes lakes, ponds, glaciers > 1 km^{2} (0.386 sq mi or 247 acres) and river estuaries.

Ponsas is a commune in the Drôme department in southeastern France.

== Population ==
Historical population
Year	Pop.	±% p.a.
1968	363	—
1975	331	−1.31%
1982	326	−0.22%
1990	430	+3.52%
1999	455	+0.63%
2007	431	−0.68%
2012	519	+3.79%
2017	527	+0.31%
2023	523	−0.13%
Source: INSEE

== See also ==
- Communes of the Drôme department
