= Miribel, Drôme =

Miribel
- Part of Valherbasse
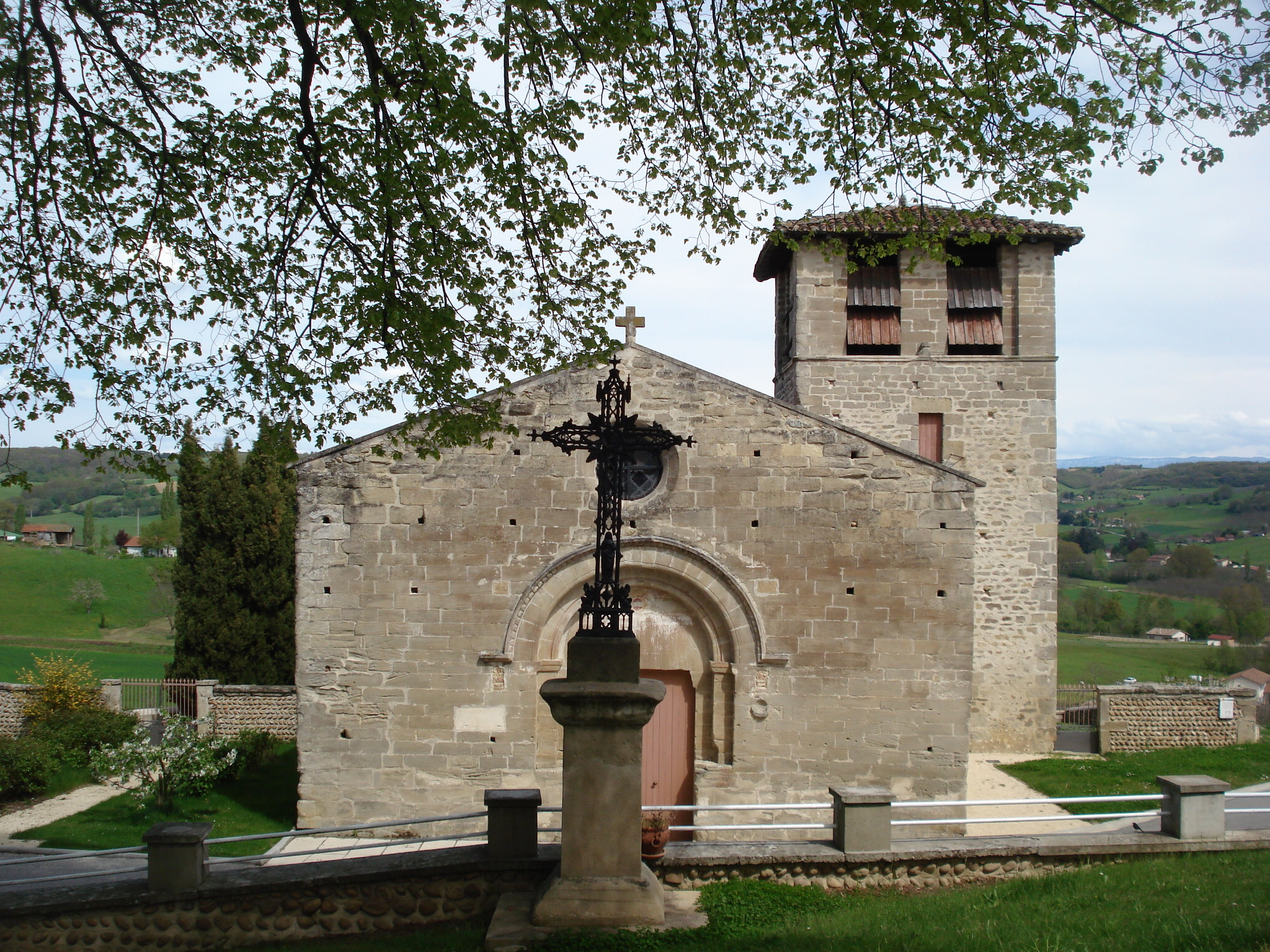
- The church of Saint-Sever, in Miribel
- Location of Miribel
- Location within France Location within Auvergne-Rhône-Alpes
- Coordinates: 45°12′00″N 5°06′41″E
- Country: France
- Region: Auvergne-Rhône-Alpes
- Department: Drôme
- Arrondissement: Valence
- Canton: Drôme des collines
- Commune: Valherbasse
- Area^{1}: 6.55 km^{2} (2.53 sq mi)
- Elevation: 393 m (1,289 ft)
- Highest elevation: 511 m (1,677 ft)
- Lowest elevation: 326 m (1,070 ft)
- Population (2023): 292
  - Density: 44.6/km^{2} (115/sq mi)
- Time zone: UTC+01:00 (CET)
  - Summer (DST): UTC+02:00 (CEST)
- Postal code: 26350
- ^{1} French Land Register data, which excludes lakes, ponds, glaciers > 1 km^{2} (0.386 sq mi or 247 acres) and river estuaries.

Miribel (French pronunciation: [miʁibɛl]; Arpitan: Merebél) is a former commune in the Drôme department in southeastern France. On 1 January 2019, it was merged into the new commune Valherbasse.

== See also ==
- Communes of the Drôme department
