= Saint-Uze =

- Commune
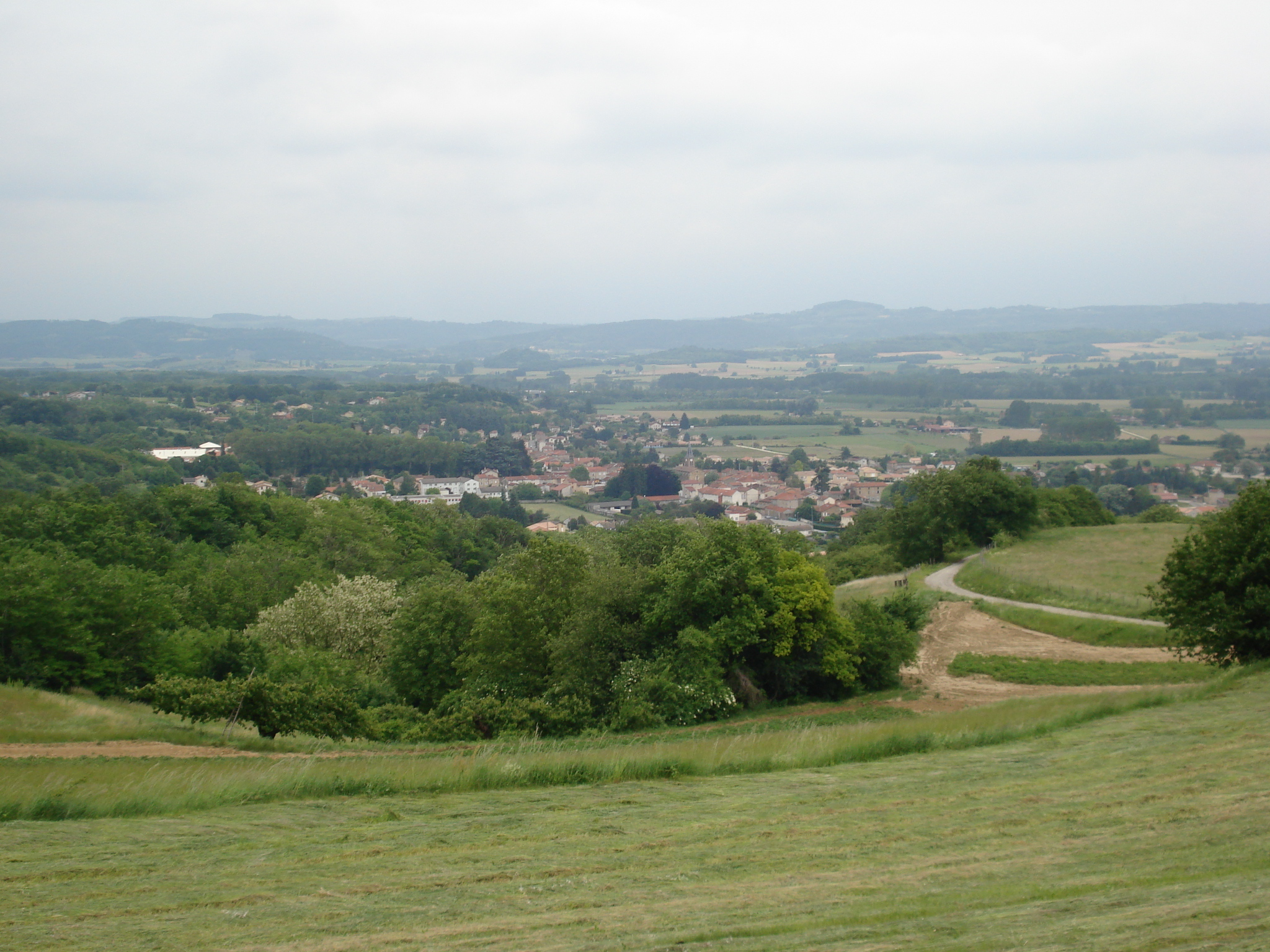
- A general view of Saint-Uze

- Coat of arms
- Location of Saint-Uze
- Location within France Location within Auvergne-Rhône-Alpes
- Coordinates: 45°10′48″N 4°51′40″E
- Country: France
- Region: Auvergne-Rhône-Alpes
- Department: Drôme
- Arrondissement: Valence
- Canton: Saint-Vallier

Government
  - Mayor (2020–2026): Jérôme Caire
- Area^{1}: 10.1 km^{2} (3.9 sq mi)
- Elevation: 189 m (620 ft)
- Highest elevation: 357 m (1,171 ft)
- Lowest elevation: 148 m (486 ft)
- Population (2023): 2,139
  - Density: 212/km^{2} (549/sq mi)
- Time zone: UTC+01:00 (CET)
  - Summer (DST): UTC+02:00 (CEST)
- INSEE/Postal code: 26332 /26240
- ^{1} French Land Register data, which excludes lakes, ponds, glaciers > 1 km^{2} (0.386 sq mi or 247 acres) and river estuaries.

Saint-Uze (French pronunciation: [sɛ̃.t‿yz]; Arpitan: Sent-Uson) is a commune in the Drôme department in southeastern France.

== Geography ==
The Galaure forms most of the commune's southern border.

== Population ==
Historical population
Year	Pop.	±% p.a.
1968	1,980	—
1975	2,086	+0.75%
1982	2,003	−0.58%
1990	1,846	−1.02%
1999	1,589	−1.65%
2007	1,842	+1.86%
2012	1,977	+1.42%
2017	2,046	+0.69%
2023	2,139	+0.74%
Source: INSEE

== Notables ==
- Félix-Marie Abel

== See also ==
- Communes of the Drôme department
