= Saint-Clair-sur-Galaure =

- Commune
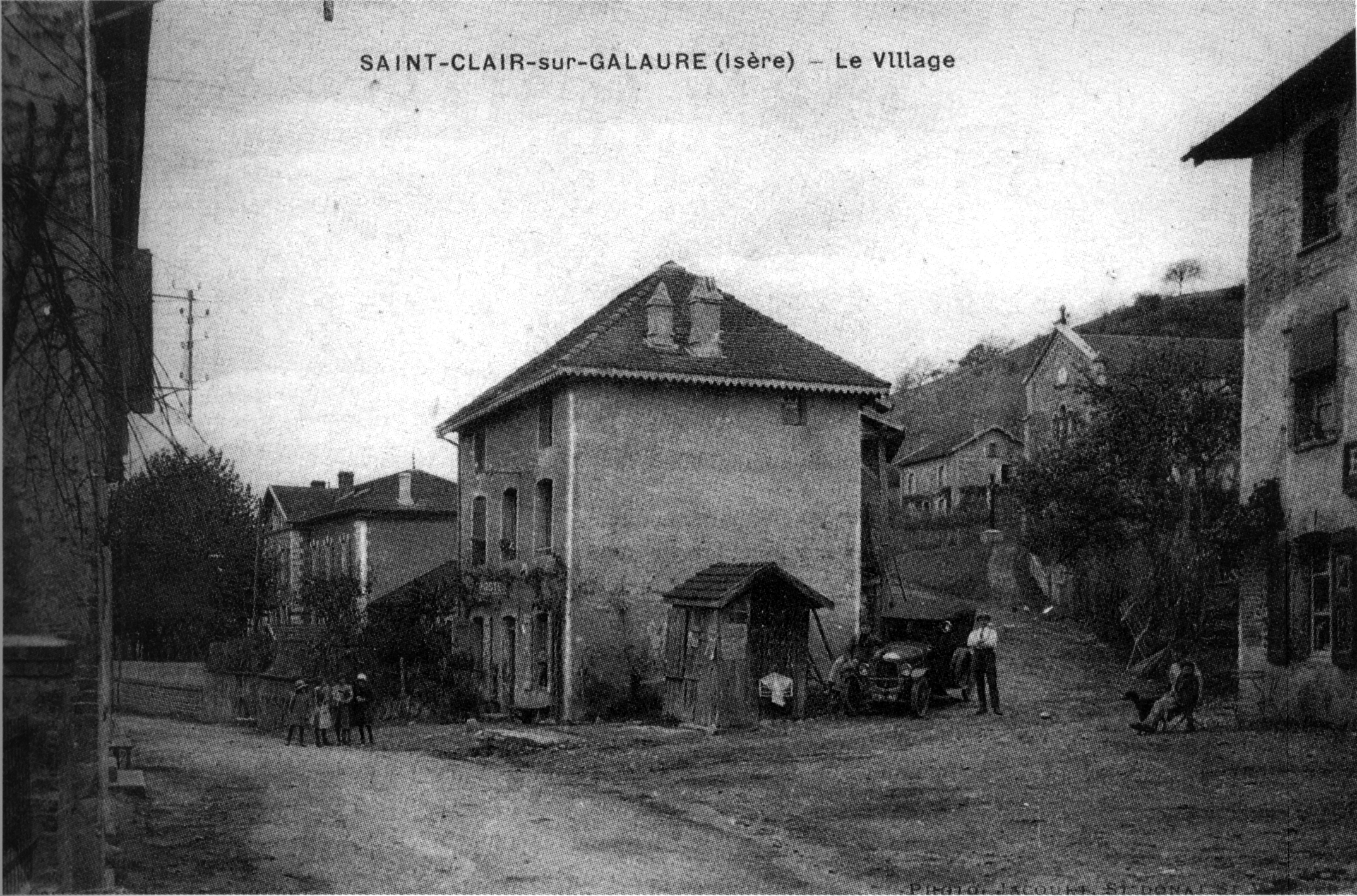
- Saint-Clair-sur-Gallure in 1912
- Location of Saint-Clair-sur-Galaure
- Location within France Location within Auvergne-Rhône-Alpes
- Coordinates: 45°15′39″N 5°08′43″E
- Country: France
- Region: Auvergne-Rhône-Alpes
- Department: Isère
- Arrondissement: Vienne
- Canton: Bièvre

Government
  - Mayor (2020–2026): Kirsten Clerino
- Area^{1}: 15.3 km^{2} (5.9 sq mi)
- Elevation: 412 m (1,352 ft)
- Highest elevation: 540 m (1,770 ft)
- Lowest elevation: 388 m (1,273 ft)
- Population (2023): 265
  - Density: 17.3/km^{2} (44.9/sq mi)
- Time zone: UTC+01:00 (CET)
  - Summer (DST): UTC+02:00 (CEST)
- INSEE/Postal code: 38379 /38940
- ^{1} French Land Register data, which excludes lakes, ponds, glaciers > 1 km^{2} (0.386 sq mi or 247 acres) and river estuaries.

Saint-Clair-sur-Galaure (French pronunciation: [sɛ̃ klɛʁ syʁ ɡalɔʁ]; literally 'Saint-Clair on Galaure') is a commune in the Isère department in southeastern France.

== Geography ==
The Galaure flows west through the southern part of the commune.

== Population ==
Historical population
Year	Pop.	±% p.a.
1968	230	—
1975	203	−1.77%
1982	228	+1.67%
1990	249	+1.11%
1999	248	−0.04%
2007	254	+0.30%
2012	257	+0.24%
2017	282	+1.87%
2023	265	−1.03%
Source: INSEE

== See also ==
- Communes of the Isère department
