= Canton of Saint-Vallier, Drôme =

Coordinates: 45.18°N 4.82°E

The canton of Saint-Vallier is an administrative division of the Drôme department, southeastern France. Its borders were modified at the French canton reorganisation which came into effect in March 2015. Its seat is in Saint-Vallier.

It consists of the following communes:

1. Albon
2. Andancette
3. Anneyron
4. Beausemblant
5. Claveyson
6. Fay-le-Clos
7. Laveyron
8. Ponsas
9. Saint-Barthélemy-de-Vals
10. Saint-Jean-de-Galaure
11. Saint-Rambert-d'Albon
12. Saint-Uze
13. Saint-Vallier
