= Ernée =

- Commune
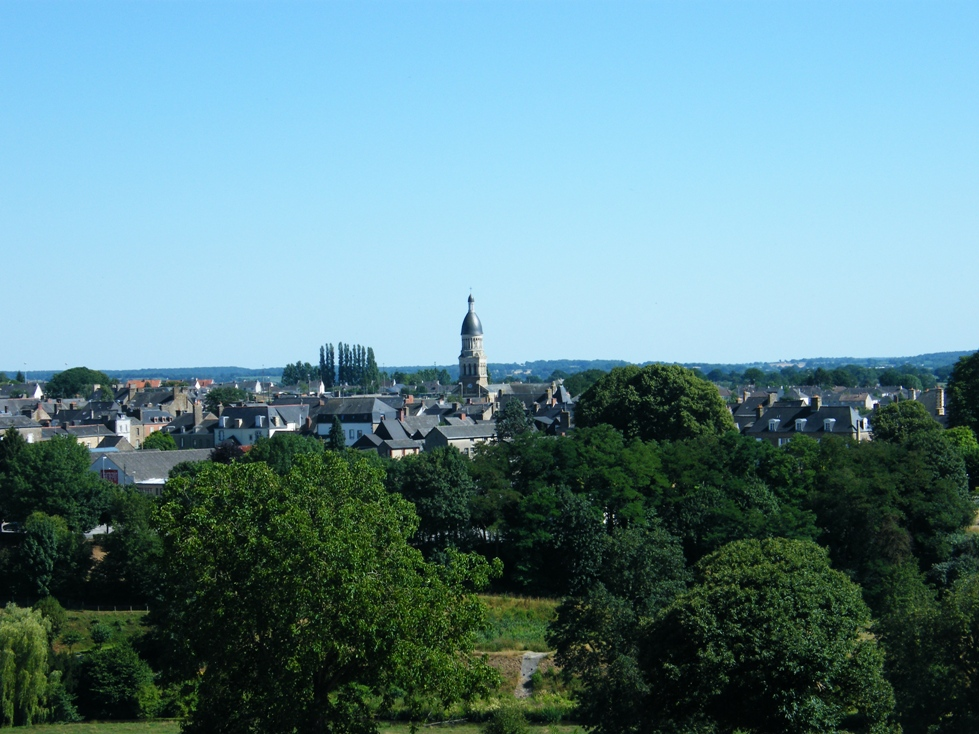
- A general view of Ernée

- Coat of arms
- Location of Ernée
- Location within France Location within Pays de la Loire
- Coordinates: 48°17′51″N 0°55′53″W
- Country: France
- Region: Pays de la Loire
- Department: Mayenne
- Arrondissement: Mayenne
- Canton: Ernée

Government
  - Mayor (2020–2026): Jacqueline Arcanger
- Area^{1}: 36.53 km^{2} (14.10 sq mi)
- Elevation: 142 m (466 ft)
- Highest elevation: 200 m (660 ft)
- Lowest elevation: 107 m (351 ft)
- Population (2023): 5,499
  - Density: 150.5/km^{2} (389.9/sq mi)
- Time zone: UTC+01:00 (CET)
  - Summer (DST): UTC+02:00 (CEST)
- INSEE/Postal code: 53096 /53500
- ^{1} French Land Register data, which excludes lakes, ponds, glaciers > 1 km^{2} (0.386 sq mi or 247 acres) and river estuaries.

Ernée (French pronunciation: [ɛʁne]) is a commune in the Mayenne department in north-western France.

It is named after the river Ernée, which runs through the town and is situated about halfway between the towns of Laval and Fougères. Ernée is home to a purpose-built motocross track, which has been used in the Motocross World Championships and Motocross des Nations.

== Neighboring communes ==
The commune is bordered by the communes of Montenay, Saint-Pierre-des-Landes, Vautorte, La Pellerine, Saint-Hilaire-du-Maine, Saint-Denis-de-Gastines.

== Population ==
Historical population
Year	Pop.	±% p.a.
1968	5,146	—
1975	5,612	+1.25%
1982	5,901	+0.72%
1990	6,052	+0.32%
1999	5,703	−0.66%
2007	5,780	+0.17%
2012	5,812	+0.11%
2017	5,731	−0.28%
2023	5,499	−0.69%
Source: INSEE

== International relations ==
Ernée is twinned with:

- Glenfield, England
- Dorsten, Germany

== See also ==
- Communes of the Mayenne department
