= Chailland =

- Commune
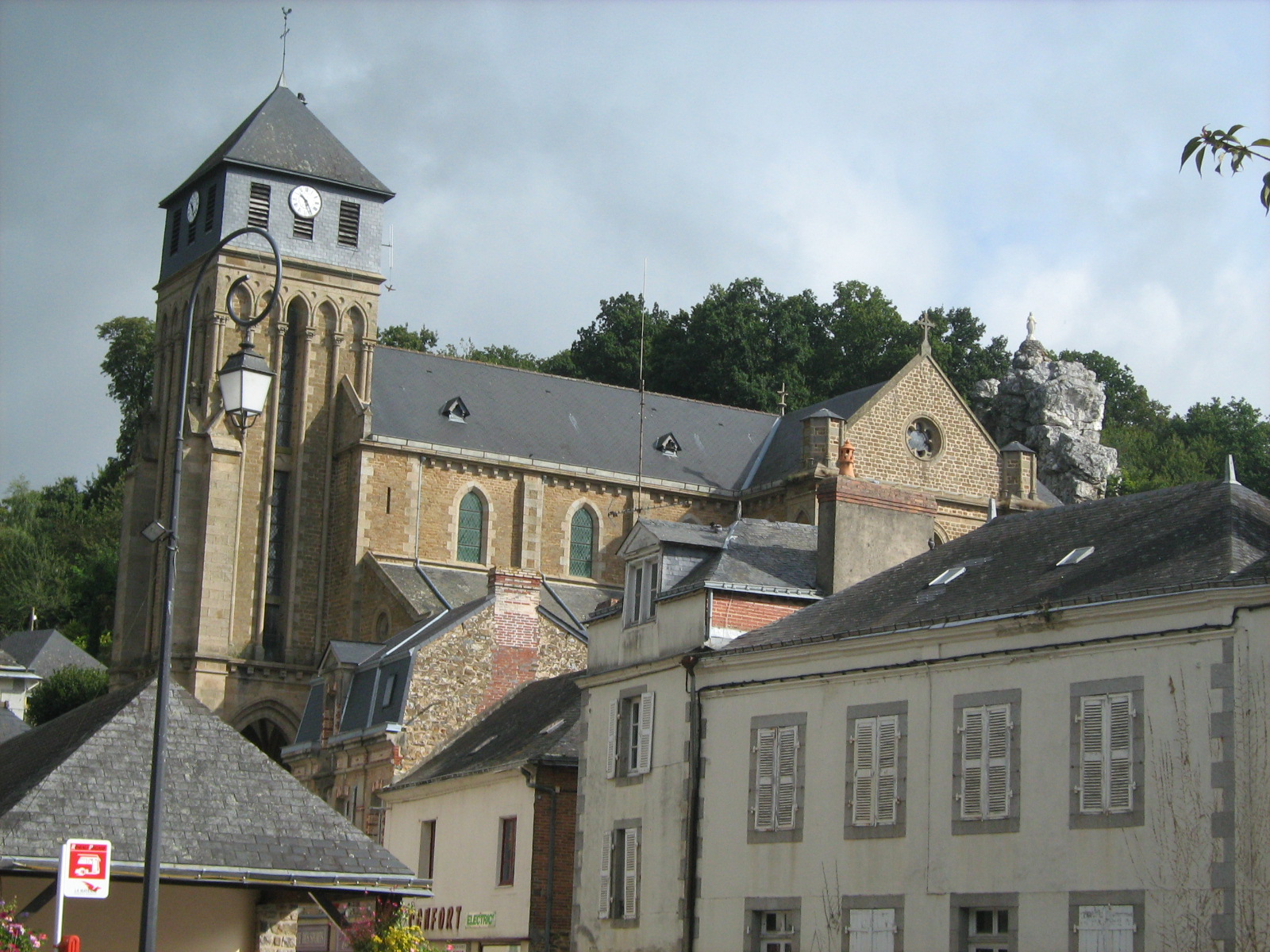
- The church in Chailland, with the Rock of the Virgin at top right

- Coat of arms
- Location of Chailland
- Location within France Location within Pays de la Loire
- Coordinates: 48°13′29″N 0°52′19″W
- Country: France
- Region: Pays de la Loire
- Department: Mayenne
- Arrondissement: Mayenne
- Canton: Ernée

Government
  - Mayor (2020–2026): Bruno Darras
- Area^{1}: 35.86 km^{2} (13.85 sq mi)
- Elevation: 88 m (289 ft)
- Highest elevation: 181 m (594 ft)
- Lowest elevation: 79 m (259 ft)
- Population (2023): 1,187
  - Density: 33.10/km^{2} (85.73/sq mi)
- Time zone: UTC+01:00 (CET)
  - Summer (DST): UTC+02:00 (CEST)
- INSEE/Postal code: 53048 /53420
- ^{1} French Land Register data, which excludes lakes, ponds, glaciers > 1 km^{2} (0.386 sq mi or 247 acres) and river estuaries.

Chailland (French pronunciation: [ʃajɑ̃]) is a commune in the Mayenne department in north-western France. It is classed as a Petites Cités de Caractère.

The rivers Ernée and Vaumourin run through the commune. It borders the communes of Saint-Hilaire-du-Maine, La Baconnière, Saint-Germain-le-Guillaume, La Bigottière, Placé and Montenay. In the village there are 2 statues looking over the village centre - statues of Jesus and the Virgin Mary.

Nestled in the valley of the verdant Ernée Valley and lined with spectacular rocky escarpments, Chailland retains traces of its industrial past.

Backed by a protective and reassuring rock face, Chailland has been able to take advantage of its privileged position since prehistoric times. The Ernée, a river that generates energy, flows at its feet and the rich and verdant forest provides wood. The village took shape in the XIth century around the imposing Romanesque church, with domain, mill and manor. But the history of this city is especially deeply marked by the forges which, from 1550 & for the following three centuries, became the beating heart of the city employing up to five hundred workers. explaining the presence of the opulent buildings, which borrow some interesting architectural elements infrequent in boroughs of this size. The Bourgeoiserie is an example with its roof Mansart. The imposing Hawke neo-Gothic granite church is another.

The small houses, all identical, aligned along the river reveal the importance of the working class community. The wash houses and the mills tell of their daily life. But to embrace all this history, you need to climb to the terraced gardens and to the heights of the Virgin on its rock. There are many interesting & safe walks in Chailland including the walk along the old tram lines into the forest where no cars are permitted.

== See also ==
- Communes of Mayenne
