= Alexain =

- Commune
- Location of Alexain
- Location within France Location within Pays de la Loire
- Coordinates: 48°13′47″N 0°46′00″W
- Country: France
- Region: Pays de la Loire
- Department: Mayenne
- Arrondissement: Mayenne
- Canton: Mayenne
- Intercommunality: Mayenne Communauté

Government
  - Mayor (2020–2026): Guillaume Chesneau
- Area^{1}: 16.24 km^{2} (6.27 sq mi)
- Elevation: 140 m (460 ft)
- Highest elevation: 167 m (548 ft)
- Lowest elevation: 72 m (236 ft)
- Population (2023): 610
  - Density: 38/km^{2} (97/sq mi)
- Time zone: UTC+01:00 (CET)
  - Summer (DST): UTC+02:00 (CEST)
- INSEE/Postal code: 53002 /53240
- ^{1} French Land Register data, which excludes lakes, ponds, glaciers > 1 km^{2} (0.386 sq mi or 247 acres) and river estuaries.

Alexain (French pronunciation: [alɛksɛ̃]) is a commune in the Mayenne department in northwestern France. It is 20 km northwest of Laval and 14 km from Mayenne. The nearest communes are La Bigottière, Placé, and Saint-Germain-d'Anxure.

== Population ==
Historical population
Year	Pop.	±% p.a.
1968	468	—
1975	433	−1.10%
1982	410	−0.78%
1990	418	+0.24%
1999	402	−0.43%
2007	478	+2.19%
2012	609	+4.96%
2017	601	−0.26%
2023	610	+0.25%
Source: INSEE

== Sights ==
The nearby Château de la Feuillée, long-term home of the d'Orenge family, was destroyed during the French Revolution and was rebuilt in 1809.

== See also ==
- Communes of Mayenne
