= Ernée (river) =

River in France

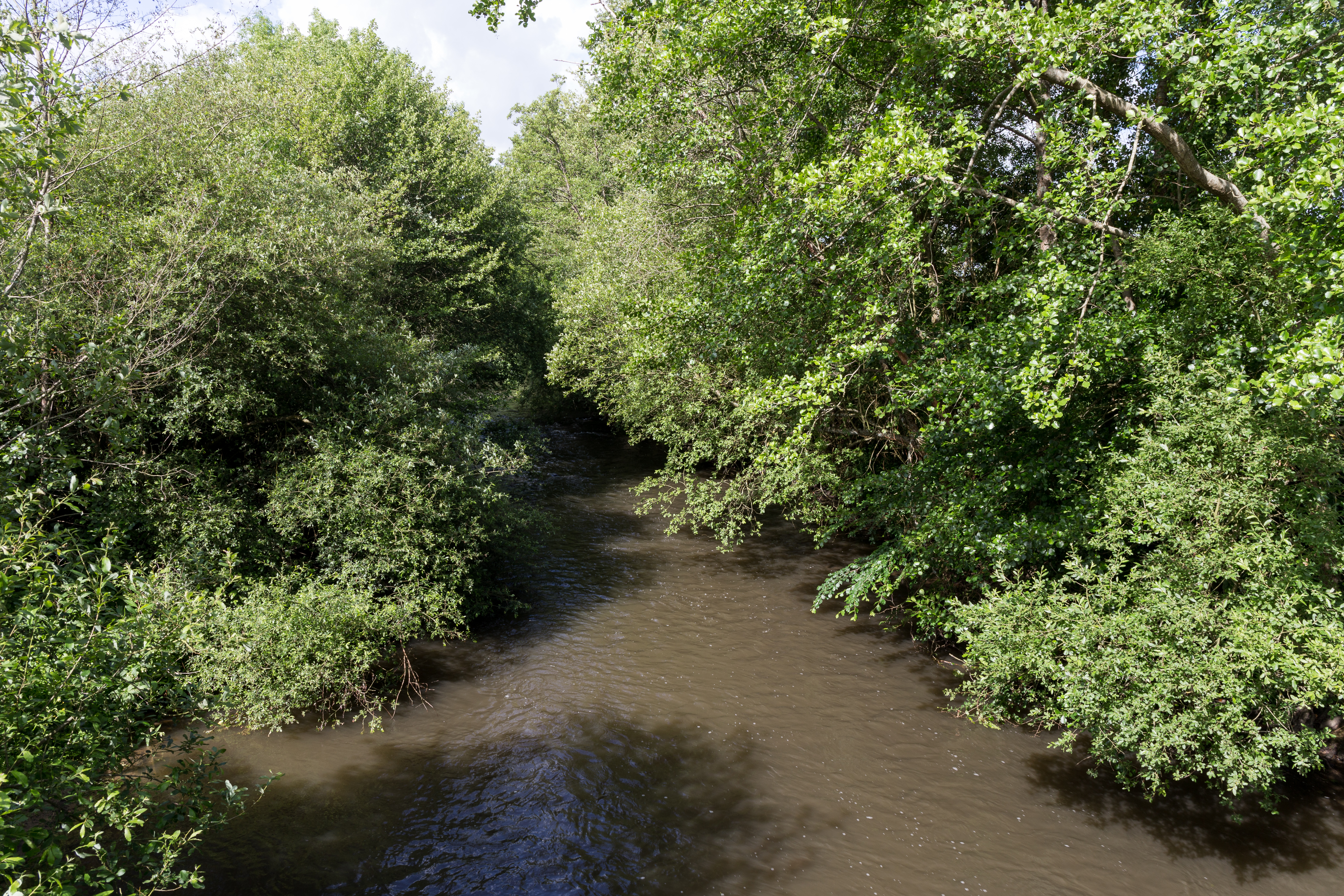

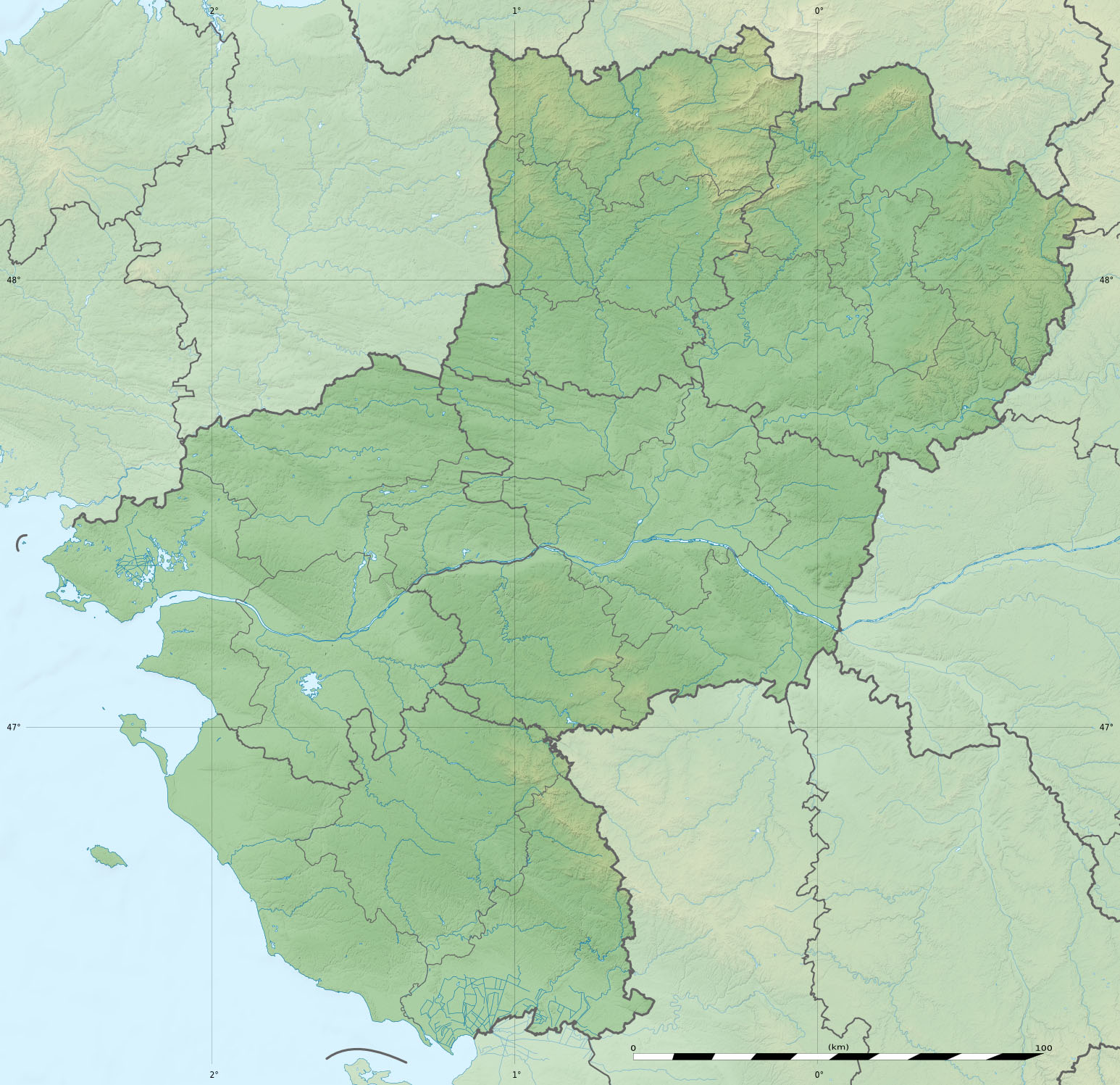
- Location within France Location within Pays de la Loire

Location
- Country: France
- Region: Pays de la Loire

Physical characteristics
- Source
  - location: Between Levaré and Saint-Berthevin-la-Tannière, Mayenne, Pays de la Loire, France
  - elevation: 225 m (738 ft)
- Mouth: Mayenne
  - coordinates: 48°7′21″N 0°45′14″W
- Length: 65.2 km (40.5 mi)
- Discharge
  - location: Andouillé
  - average: 3.9 m^{3}/s (140 cu ft/s)

Basin features
- Progression: Mayenne→ Maine→ Loire→ Atlantic Ocean

The Ernée (French pronunciation: [ɛʁne]) is a 65.2 km (40.5 mi) long river in the department of Mayenne, Pays de la Loire, northwestern France. Its source is in the commune of Levaré, and it flows through the communes of Ernée, Chailland, Andouillé and Saint-Germain-le-Fouilloux, before flowing into the river Mayenne (right bank) at Saint-Jean-sur-Mayenne.
