= Espresso (song) =

2024 single by Sabrina Carpenter

Single by Sabrina Carpenter

from the album Short n' Sweet
- B-side: "Espresso (on vacation)"
- Released: April 11, 2024
- Recorded: July 2023 – February 2024
- Studio: Flow (Chailland); The Perch (Calabasas); The Nest (Nashville)
- Genre: Bubblegum; dance; electropop; funk; nu-disco; post-disco; synth-pop
- Length: 2:55
- Label: Island
- Songwriters: Sabrina Carpenter; Julian Bunetta; Amy Allen; Steph Jones
- Producer: Julian Bunetta

Sabrina Carpenter singles chronology
"You Need Me Now?" (2024)	"Espresso" (2024)	"Please Please Please" (2024)

Music video
- "Espresso" on YouTube

"Espresso" is a song by American singer Sabrina Carpenter from her sixth studio album, Short n' Sweet (2024). Island Records released it on April 11, 2024, as the album's lead single. It was written by Carpenter herself along with Amy Allen, Steph Jones, and its producer Julian Bunetta. A combination of pop, funk, and dance with other subgenres, the song contains lyrics about self-confidence.

"Espresso" received acclaim from music critics for its songwriting and catchiness. It became a commercial success, peaking at number three on the Billboard Hot 100, marking Carpenter's first top five single on the chart, and spending a total of 65 weeks charting. Outside of the United States, "Espresso" topped the charts in more than 20 countries, including Australia, Belgium, Ireland, Norway, and the United Kingdom, and peaked within the top ten in at least 20 other nations. It also earned Carpenter her first number-one single on the Billboard Global 200. It is certified Platinum or higher in fourteen countries, including Diamond in Australia and France. It has over 3.2 billion streams on Spotify.

Dave Meyers directed the accompanying music video for "Espresso". To support the song's release, Carpenter performed it at Coachella 2024. She also sang the song in televised performances on Saturday Night Live and The Tonight Show Starring Jimmy Fallon, at BBC Radio 1's Big Weekend, and at the 2024 MTV Video Music Awards and the 67th Annual Grammy Awards. She included it as the encore on the set list to her fifth concert tour, the Short n' Sweet Tour (2024–2025). It received the MTV Video Music Award for Song of the Year, marking Carpenter's first VMA win. At the 67th Annual Grammy Awards, "Espresso" received nominations for Record of the Year, Best Pop Solo Performance, and Best Remixed Recording, winning the latter two awards.

== Background ==
On January 16, 2024, Carpenter was confirmed as part of the American festival Coachella, held in Indio, California. She teased a new song, ahead of her performance at the festival, via billboards that read: "She's gonna make you come... to her Coachella set!". Carpenter announced the release of "Espresso" on her social media accounts on April 8, 2024, along with its release date and cover artwork. She captioned the post with: "Just wanted to put out a little song before Coachella". Island Records released the single via streaming and digital download, while Polydor Records released it through vinyl and cassette formats.

=== Writing and composition ===
After a concert in July 2023 at the Zénith Paris in France, Carpenter spent a few days in the village of Chailland, where she recorded some new tracks at Flow Studios. In an interview with Zane Lowe on Apple Music 1, Carpenter confirmed that she wrote the song there in a "very quick process", and that inspired "how the song ended up feeling". Carpenter said that although her immediate team largely supported "Espresso", executives at her record label were more hesitant about releasing it as a single, questioning whether it made sense.

The lyrics of the song are about self-confidence. Speaking to American magazine Vogue, she stated that the song is about "seeing femininity as your super power and embracing the confidence of being 'that bitch'". Music journalists described the song's genre as pop, funk, and dance, encompassing synth-pop, electropop, disco, post-disco, nu-disco, and bubblegum. Musicologist Dr. Joe Bennett considered the song to be part of the ongoing disco revival and drew comparisons to songs by Daft Punk, Dua Lipa, Lizzo, and Doja Cat. The main guitar riff and drums featured in the song are loops coming from the Splice sample pack "Power Tools Sample Pack III", created by Oliver.

== Critical reception ==
"Espresso" received widespread acclaim from critics. Vulture highlighted the song's catchy hook, referring to it as an "instant earworm", while also appreciating its "whimsical" lyrical approach. Uproxx praised Carpenter's "playful" lyrics and the track's "infectious groove", describing "Espresso" as a "fun, upbeat song that demonstrates Carpenter's growth as a songwriter". Similarly, Rolling Stone lauded the song's "irresistible rhythm" and "clever" lyrics, emphasizing Carpenter's distinctive flair for storytelling. Despite only being released in April, NME stated "Espresso" quickly became a substantial hit in Carpenter's career and one of her signature songs. Tena Razumović of Vogue Adria noted that its "light melody, like a breeze, fills out the air and space with sound", praised its "atmosphere of the '80s and Italo disco" and "catchy phrases", and further praised Mark Ronson's remix of the song.

Pitchfork included "Espresso" on its 2024 list of the 100 Best Songs of the 2020s So Far, ranking it at number 30. Trent Reznor, frontman of the rock band Nine Inch Nails, named "Espresso" the best song of 2024.

=== Year-end lists ===
Publication	List	Rank	Ref.
Associated Press	Top Songs of 2024	—N/a	
Billboard	The 100 Best Songs of 2024	3	
Consequence	200 Best Songs of 2024	8	
Elle	The Best New Songs of 2024	—N/a	
Entertainment Weekly	The 10 Best Songs of 2024	5	
Exclaim!	20 Best Songs of 2024	6	
The Guardian	The 20 Best Songs of 2024	2	
The New York Times	Lindsay Zoladz's Best Songs of 2024	1	
NPR	124 Best Songs of 2024	—N/a	
Pitchfork	The 100 Best Songs of 2024	7	
The Ringer	The 11 Best Songs of 2024	2	
Rolling Stone	The 100 Best Songs of 2024	4	
Stereogum	The 50 Best Songs of 2024	8	
UPROXX	The Best Songs of 2024	—N/a	
The Washington Post	Best Singles of 2024	9	

=== Analysis ===
The song received attention for its lyrics, particularly the use of a recurring line in the chorus, "That's that me espresso". Two journalists consulted with grammar experts to help with their analyses of the phrase; linguistics expert and journalist Samantha Allen noted that the "nonsense" line became a meme and noted its ambiguous meaning, discussing with grammar blogger Jeffrey Barg whether "me espresso" is a single noun phrase or two noun phrases in apposition. Vulture writer Justin Curto consulted linguistics professor Ekkarat Ruanglertsilp who suggested "that's not grammatically correct, right?".

== Commercial performance ==
=== United States ===
"Espresso" debuted at number ten on the Billboard Global 200 chart, becoming Carpenter's first top-ten hit and fourth overall entry on the chart. By the week of June 22, 2024, the song had reached its peak at number one, becoming her first song to top the chart. In the United States, "Espresso" debuted at number seven on the Billboard Hot 100 chart for the week dated April 27, 2024, marking Carpenter's first top ten hit on the chart. The song had risen to a new peak at number three on the chart dated June 22, 2024. This achievement also represents Carpenter's fourth entry on the Hot 100 and second top 40 hit overall. Furthermore, "Espresso" is Carpenter's eighth entry and second number one single on the Billboard Pop Airplay chart.

=== United Kingdom ===
In the United Kingdom, "Espresso" debuted at number six on the UK Singles Chart before climbing to number five in its second week, and peaking at the top of the chart in its third week. It is Carpenter's first chart-topper and top ten song in Britain, and her fourth top 40 hit overall there. The song spent five consecutive weeks at the top of the chart before being dethroned by "Houdini" by Eminem. On July 12, 2024 – for the week ending date July 18, 2024 – "Espresso" returned to the top of the UK Singles Chart for a further two weeks, replacing her own song "Please Please Please" from the summit, where it had remained for two consecutive weeks and became just the second female artist ever to replace themselves at number one after Ariana Grande. On July 26, 2,4 – for the week ending date August 1, 20, – "Espresso" was dethroned from the top of the UK Singles Chart by "Please Please Please". The song fell to number nine on the chart.

=== Worldwide ===
In Ireland, the song debuted at number four on the Irish Singles Chart and then climbed to number three the week after. "Espresso" topped the Irish Singles Chart in its third week, becoming Carpenter's first chart-topping hit in Ireland and first top-ten song there. It also reached the top of the ARIA Singles Chart in Australia.

In Canada, 'Espresso' debuted at number seven on the Canadian Hot 100 chart dated April 27, 2024, becoming her first top ten hit on the chart. The song eventually peaked at number three on its eleventh week, holding the spot for fourteen consecutive weeks. The song also debuted at number 70 on the Brasil Hot 100.

In Europe, Latin America, and Asia, the song met an unexpected success, topping the charts in some countries, including India, Singapore, Malaysia, and Iceland, top ten in Indonesia, France, Portugal, Germany, Sweden, Norway, Denmark, and Belgium, top twenty in Taiwan, Austria, and Finland, top thirty in Kazakhstan and Hungary, and top forty in Brazil and Argentina.

== Music video ==
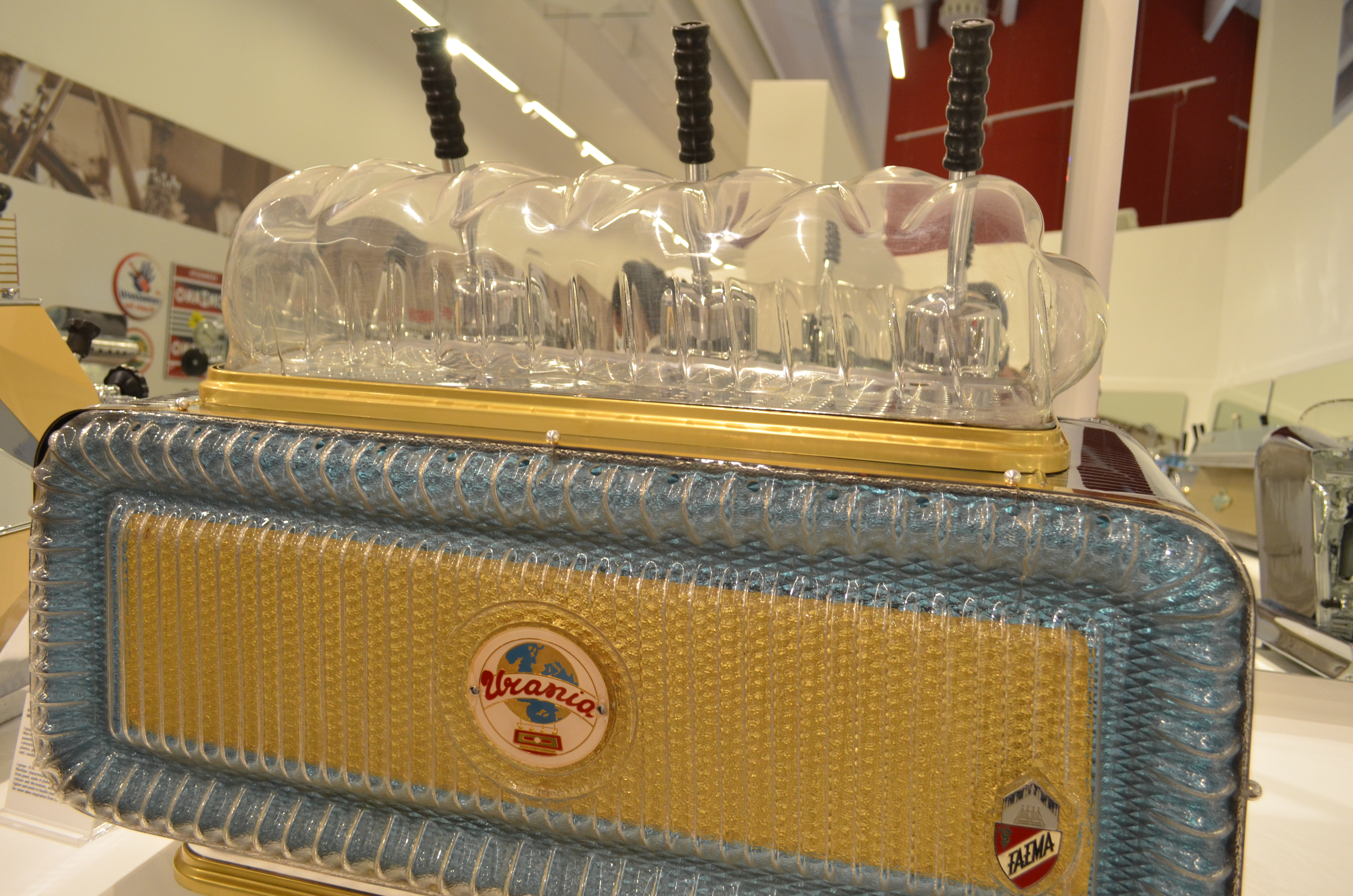
Vintage Faema Urania (1956) Italian espresso machine, illustrating a visual sense similar to Carpenter’s video (MUMAC 2012)

An accompanying music video for "Espresso", directed by Dave Meyers, was filmed at Castaic Lake, California, through the span of March 26-27 2024, and released on April 12, 2024. About the video, Carpenter expressed: "Since the day I heard the song, I saw a beach atmosphere—and more specifically this kind of old school [and] modern environment. [I wanted to capture] the playfulness that I like to use throughout all of my videos. I also just wanted a pool car, to be frank".

The video begins with Carpenter driving a man across the lake in a speedboat. As the man leans close behind her, she makes a sharp turn that leads to him falling out of the boat. Carpenter retrieves his wallet and pulls out his gold credit card. As she makes land, she meets with other girls and engages in various activities such as reading a book, receiving massages and pedicures, enjoying espresso served in distinctive conical demitasse cups with a small spoon for stirring, and sunbathing while being fanned by palm fronds. Right before the second verse, another vintage car shows up with a bunch of other boys, who hold up a surfboard that she dances on top of. They continue to party together, and the car is eventually filled with water as Carpenter and one of the boys lounge in it like a hot tub. However, she is then spotted by the man from the beginning of the video, along with the police, who apprehend Carpenter and recover the man's wallet and gold credit card. As her friends unsuccessfully try to protest to the cops, she waves goodbye to her friends before being shoved into the cop car, which the police officer is unable to start up. In the last few seconds, part of the instrumental from "Please Please Please", Carpenter's next single, plays from a horn on the top of the police car.

== Live performances ==
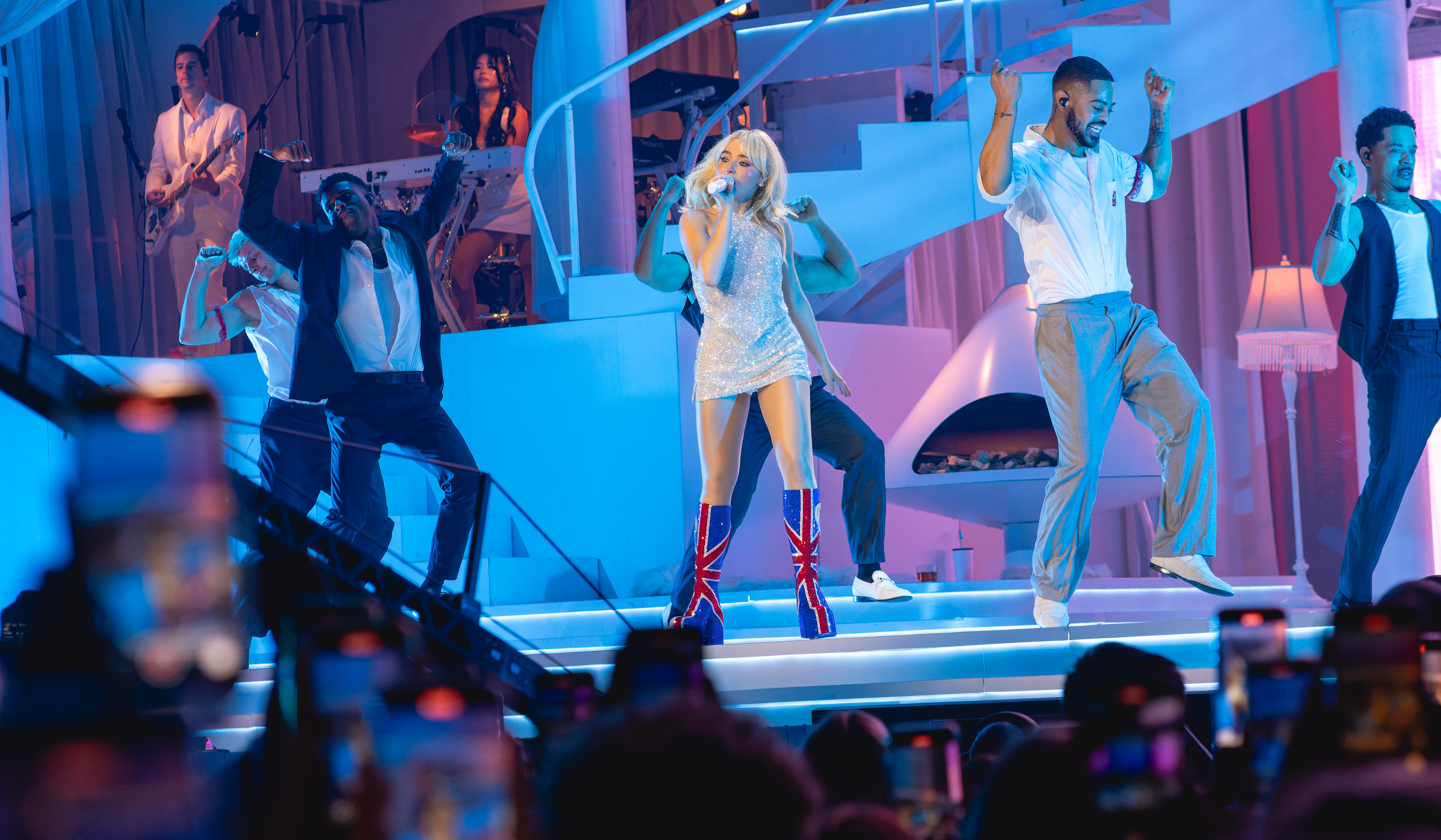
Carpenter performing "Espresso" on the Short n' Sweet Tour in 2025

Carpenter performed "Espresso" live for the first time at the 2024 Coachella Valley Music and Arts Festival, held on April 12. On May 18, Carpenter performed the song on Saturday Night Live. On May 26, the song was also performed by Carpenter at the 2024 BBC Radio 1's Big Weekend in Luton, England. On September 11, Carpenter performed the song alongside "Please Please Please" and "Taste" at the 2024 MTV Video Music Awards, where she won Song of the Year for "Espresso".

"Espresso" was included on the set list to Carpenter's fifth concert tour, the Short n' Sweet Tour, in 2024. On October 26, Carpenter performed the song with Taylor Swift at a show in New Orleans for Swift's Eras Tour, in a mashup with "Please Please Please" and Swift's song "Is It Over Now?". On February 2, 2025, Carpenter performed "Espresso" at the 67th Annual Grammy Awards.

On April 10 and April 17, 2026, Carpenter performed the song as part of her Coachella Valley Music and Arts Festival setlist.

On May 4, 2026, Carpenter performed the song at the Vogue Met Gala.

== Usage in media ==
"Espresso" is featured on the main tracklist of the dance-rhythm video game Just Dance 2025 Edition. It was later featured in Fortnite as an emote.

On October 12, 2024, Ariana Grande hosted Saturday Night Live, where Carpenter had performed the song live just months prior. Grande parodied "Espresso" as part of a bridesmaids troupe, where she deliberately sang off key, prompting Carpenter to react on Instagram, posting "Very nice and on pitch". The sketch was immensely popular on TikTok, garnering over 80 million views as of October 18, 2024.

Foodbeast reported in November 2024, Carpenter had worked with Absolut Vodka and Kahlúa to release her own martini kit, the "Short n' Sweet Espresso Martini Kit" named after the song and her album Short n' Sweet, the martini kit features 375ml bottles of Absolut and Kahlúa coffee liqueur, paired with Owen's Espresso Martini Mix, a coupe glass with a festive red ribbon, an edible cocktail topper and in the shape of the singer's kiss mark. The martini kit was released on November 14, 2024. In December 2024, Carpenter collaborated with coffee and doughnut company Dunkin' Donuts to release an iced beverage, "Sabrina's Brown Sugar Shakin' Espresso", named in honor of the song.

The song was used in the DreamWorks Animation film The Bad Guys 2, as Snake is listening to it upon his arrival in the gang's home following a workout.

The song also was used in the Yomiuri TV and Nippon TV Spring 2025 Japanese drama are called If She Calls That Love Too (彼女がそれも愛と呼ぶなら, Kanojo ga Sore mo Ai to Yobunara), which starring by Chiaki Kuriyama, Kentaro Itō, Kento Senga and Tomomi Maruyama as official theme.

The song was also used on the NBC TV show, Law & Order: Special Victims Unit, in the opening scene of the Season 26 episode, "Rorschach", where Ellie and her boyfriend, Chris, were on a video montage of their cross-country trip; it would later transition to a woman hiking in a forest listening to the song on her headphones where she would later find the couple injured on the ground near their camping spot.

The song was also used in season 5 episode 2 of the Netflix TV series Emily In Paris. Mindy Chen performs the song while in Rome. The performance occurs during a Bavazza coffee event for Agence Grateau, featuring an elaborate, multi-day filmed sequence where Mindy opens the song in a similar way to Sabrina Carpenter in the Espresso music video, on a speedboat and later Mindy appears in a giant martini glass.

== Track listing ==
- 7-inch / cassette
1. "Espresso" – 2:55
2. "Espresso" (on vacation) – 2:55
- Digital EP
1. "Espresso" – 2:55
2. "Espresso" (double shot) – 2:29
3. "Espresso" (on vacation version) – 2:55
4. "Espresso" (decaf) – 3:14
5. "Espresso" (mochapella) – 2:55
6. "Espresso" (espressooooo) – 4:55
- Working late remixes
1. "Espresso" (Mark Ronson x FNZ working late remix) – 3:04
2. "Espresso" (Mark Ronson x FNZ working later remix) – 5:38
3. "Espresso" – 2:55

== Credits and personnel ==
Recording and management

- Recorded at Flow Studios (Chailland, France), The Perch (Calabasas, California) and The Nest (Nashville, Tennessee).
- Sabalicious Songs (BMI) administered by Songs Of Universal, Inc., Music Of Big Family/Dragon Bunny Music (BBM I all rights administered by Hipgnosis Songs Group, Kenny + Betty Tunes (ASCAP) administered by WC Music Corp., Steph Jones Who Music (ASCAP) administered by Reservoir Media Management, Inc.

Personnel Credits adapted from the single's liner notes.

- Sabrina Carpenter – vocals, songwriting
- Julian Bunetta – bass, drums, guitar, keyboards, percussion, production, songwriting, mixing, programming, engineering
- Amy Allen – background vocals, songwriting
- Steph Jones – background vocals, songwriting
- Jeff Gunnell – mixing, engineering
- Nathan Dantzler – mastering at The Hit Lab, Nashville
- Harrison Tate – mastering assistant

== Accolades ==
Organization	Year	Category	Result	Ref.
Nickelodeon Kids' Choice Awards	2024	Favorite Viral Song	Won	
MTV Video Music Awards	2024	Song of the Year	Won	
MTV Video Music Awards	2024	Best Editing	Nominated	
NRJ Music Awards	2024	International Hit of the Year	Nominated	
Los 40 Music Awards	2024	Best International Song	Nominated	
MTV Europe Music Awards	2024	Best Song	Won	
Myx Music Awards	2024	Global Video of the Year	Won	
Danish Music Awards	2024	International Hit of the Year	Won	
Musa Awards	2024	Anglo International Song of the Year	Nominated	
Billboard Music Awards	2024	Top Billboard Global 200 Song	Nominated	
Billboard Music Awards	2024	Top Billboard Global 200 (Excl. US) Song	Nominated	
Grammy Awards	2025	Record of the Year	Nominated	
Grammy Awards	2025	Best Pop Solo Performance	Won	
Grammy Awards	2025	Best Remixed Recording, Non-Classical (Note: Mark Ronson x FnZ working late remix)	Won	
Hollywood Music Video Awards	2025	Best Editing	Won	
Hollywood Music Video Awards	2025	Best Color Grading	Nominated	
iHeartRadio Music Awards	2025	Song of the Year	Nominated	
iHeartRadio Music Awards	2025	Pop Song of the Year	Won	
iHeartRadio Music Awards	2025	Best Lyrics	Nominated	
iHeartRadio Music Awards	2025	Best Music Video	Nominated	
Brit Awards	2025	Best International Song	Nominated	

== Charts ==
=== Weekly charts ===
Chart (2024–2026)	Peak position
Argentina Hot 100 (Billboard)	25
Argentina Airplay (Monitor Latino)	4
Australia (ARIA)	1
Austria (Ö3 Austria Top 40)	5
Belarus Airplay (TopHit)	1
Belgium (Ultratop 50 Flanders)	1
Belgium (Ultratop 50 Wallonia)	1
Bolivia Airplay (Monitor Latino)	12
Brazil Hot 100 (Billboard)	32
Bulgaria Airplay (PROPHON)	1
Canada Hot 100 (Billboard)	3
Canada AC (Billboard)	1
Canada CHR/Top 40 (Billboard)	1
Canada Hot AC (Billboard)	2
Central America Anglo Airplay (Monitor Latino)	3
Central America + Caribbean (BMAT)	19
Chile Airplay (Monitor Latino)	2
Colombia Anglo Airplay (National-Report)	1
CIS Airplay (TopHit)	1
Costa Rica Anglo Airplay (Monitor Latino)	6
Croatia (Billboard)	10
Croatia International Airplay (Top lista)	1
Czech Republic Airplay (ČNS IFPI)	10
Czech Republic Singles Digital (ČNS IFPI)	10
Denmark (Tracklisten)	3
Dominican Republic Anglo Airplay (Monitor Latino)	1
Ecuador Anglo Airplay (Monitor Latino)	1
El Salvador Airplay (Monitor Latino)	14
Estonia Airplay (TopHit)	1
Finland (Suomen virallinen lista)	12
France (SNEP)	7
France Airplay (SNEP)	1
Germany (GfK)	4
Germany Airplay (BVMI)	1
Global 200 (Billboard)	1
Greece International (IFPI)	3
Guatemala Anglo Airplay (Monitor Latino)	3
Honduras Anglo Airplay (Monitor Latino)	3
Hong Kong (Billboard)	9
Hungary (Rádiós Top 40)	28
Hungary (Single Top 40)	16
Iceland (Tónlistinn)	1
India International (IMI)	1
Indonesia (Billboard)	3
Ireland (IRMA)	1
Israel (Mako Hitlist)	24
Italy (FIMI)	32
Jamaica Airplay (JAMMS)	4
Japan Hot 100 (Billboard)	95
Kazakhstan Airplay (TopHit)	2
Latin America Anglo Airplay (Monitor Latino)	1
Latvia Airplay (LaIPA)	1
Latvia Streaming (LaIPA)	3
Lebanon (Lebanese Top 20)	2
Lithuania (AGATA)	2
Lithuania Airplay (TopHit)	1
Luxembourg (Billboard)	2
Malaysia (Billboard)	1
Mexico Anglo Airplay (Monitor Latino)	2
Middle East and North Africa (IFPI)	1
Moldova Airplay (TopHit)	99
Netherlands (Dutch Top 40)	3
Netherlands (Single Top 100)	4
New Zealand (Recorded Music NZ)	2
Nicaragua Anglo Airplay (Monitor Latino)	1
Nigeria (TurnTable Top 100)	56
Norway (VG-lista)	2
Panama Airplay (Monitor Latino)	6
Paraguay Airplay (Monitor Latino)	1
Peru (Billboard)	16
Peru Airplay (Monitor Latino)	14
Philippines (Billboard)	3
Poland Airplay (OLiS)	4
Poland Streaming (OLiS)	12
Portugal (AFP)	2
Puerto Rico Anglo Airplay (Monitor Latino)	2
Romania Airplay (UPFR)	6
Romania Airplay (Media Forest)	5
Romania TV Airplay (Media Forest)	15
Russia Airplay (TopHit)	2
San Marino Airplay (SMRTV Top 50)	19
Saudi Arabia (IFPI)	3
Serbia Airplay (Radiomonitor)	1
Singapore (RIAS)	1
Slovakia Airplay (ČNS IFPI)	5
Slovakia Singles Digital (ČNS IFPI)	11
South Africa Streaming (TOSAC)	5
South Korea (Circle)	97
Spain (Promusicae)	26
Sweden (Sverigetopplistan)	4
Switzerland (Schweizer Hitparade)	2
Taiwan (Billboard)	18
Turkey International Airplay (Radiomonitor Türkiye)	1
Ukraine Airplay (TopHit)	4
United Arab Emirates (IFPI)	1
UK Singles (Official Charts)	1
Uruguay Airplay (Monitor Latino)	7
US Billboard Hot 100	3
US Adult Contemporary (Billboard)	2
US Adult Pop Airplay (Billboard)	1
US Dance Airplay (Billboard)	6
US Pop Airplay (Billboard)	1
US Rhythmic Airplay (Billboard)	23
Venezuela Airplay (Record Report)	48

=== Monthly charts ===
Chart (2024)	Position
Belarus Airplay (TopHit)	1
Brazil Streaming (Pro-Música Brasil)	48
CIS Airplay (TopHit)	1
Czech Republic (Rádio Top 100)	34
Czech Republic (Singles Digitál Top 100)	11
Estonia Airplay (TopHit)	1
Kazakhstan Airplay (TopHit)	2
Latvia Airplay (TopHit)	1
Lithuania Airplay (TopHit)	1
Paraguay Airplay (SGP)	4
Romania Airplay (TopHit)	10
Russia Airplay (TopHit)	6
Slovakia (Rádio Top 100)	6
Slovakia (Singles Digitál Top 100)	11
South Korea (Circle)	127
Ukraine Airplay (TopHit)	5

=== Year-end charts ===
Chart (2024)	Position
Australia (ARIA)	3
Austria (Ö3 Austria Top 40)	12
Belarus Airplay (TopHit)	14
Belgium (Ultratop 50 Flanders)	10
Belgium (Ultratop 50 Wallonia)	9
Bulgaria Airplay (PROPHON)	4
Canada (Canadian Hot 100)	6
Chile Airplay (Monitor Latino)	16
CIS Airplay (TopHit)	2
Denmark (Tracklisten)	12
Estonia Airplay (TopHit)	2
France (SNEP)	19
Germany (GfK)	16
Global 200 (Billboard)	3
Global Singles (IFPI)	2
Hungary (Single Top 40)	65
Iceland (Tónlistinn)	5
India International Streaming (IMI)	2
Italy (FIMI)	80
Kazakhstan Airplay (TopHit)	18
Latvia Airplay (TopHit)	3
Lithuania Airplay (TopHit)	1
Netherlands (Dutch Top 40)	10
Netherlands (Single Top 100)	11
New Zealand (Recorded Music NZ)	5
Philippines (Philippines Hot 100)	10
Poland (Polish Airplay Top 100)	35
Poland (Polish Streaming Top 100)	25
Romania Airplay (TopHit)	41
Russia Airplay (TopHit)	10
Sweden (Sverigetopplistan)	11
Switzerland (Schweizer Hitparade)	7
UK Singles (OCC)	3
US Billboard Hot 100	7
US Adult Contemporary (Billboard)	21
US Adult Top 40 (Billboard)	8
US Dance/Mix Show Airplay (Billboard)	13
US Mainstream Top 40 (Billboard)	8

Chart (2025)	Position
Argentina Airplay (Monitor Latino)	25
Australia (ARIA)	19
Austria (Ö3 Austria Top 40)	38
Belarus Airplay (TopHit)	25
Belgium (Ultratop 50 Flanders)	52
Belgium (Ultratop 50 Wallonia)	86
Bolivia Anglo Airplay (Monitor Latino)	9
Canada (Canadian Hot 100)	23
Canada AC (Billboard)	30
Canada CHR/Top 40 (Billboard)	88
Canada Hot AC (Billboard)	2
Central America Anglo Airplay (Monitor Latino)	7
Chile Airplay (Monitor Latino)	12
Colombia Anglo Airplay (Monitor Latino)	24
CIS Airplay (TopHit)	25
Costa Rica Anglo Airplay (Monitor Latino)	33
Denmark (Tracklisten)	74
Dominican Republic Anglo Airplay (Monitor Latino)	3
Ecuador Anglo Airplay (Monitor Latino)	7
Estonia Airplay (TopHit)	75
France (SNEP)	78
Germany (GfK)	36
Global 200 (Billboard)	9
Guatemala Anglo Airplay (Monitor Latino)	12
Iceland (Tónlistinn)	99
India International (IMI)	7
Kazakhstan Airplay (TopHit)	193
Latvia Airplay (TopHit)	195
Lithuania Airplay (TopHit)	17
Mexico Anglo Airplay (Monitor Latino)	28
Netherlands (Single Top 100)	56
New Zealand (Recorded Music NZ)	42
Nicaragua Anglo Airplay (Monitor Latino)	27
Panama Airplay (Monitor Latino)	27
Paraguay Airplay (Monitor Latino)	73
Peru Anglo Airplay (Monitor Latino)	20
Philippines (Philippines Hot 100)	70
Poland (Polish Streaming Top 100)	87
Puerto Rico Anglo Airplay (Monitor Latino)	59
Romania Airplay (TopHit)	83
Russia Airplay (TopHit)	124
Sweden (Sverigetopplistan)	53
Switzerland (Schweizer Hitparade)	37
UK Singles (OCC)	17
Uruguay Airplay (Monitor Latino)	26
US Billboard Hot 100	12
US Adult Contemporary (Billboard)	4
US Adult Pop Airplay (Billboard)	3
US Pop Airplay (Billboard)	19
Venezuela Anglo Airplay (Monitor Latino)	6

== Certifications ==
Certifications for "Espresso"
Region	Certification	Certified units/sales
Australia (ARIA)	10× Platinum	700,000^{‡}
Austria (IFPI Austria)	2× Platinum	60,000^{‡}
Belgium (BRMA)	2× Platinum	80,000^{‡}
Brazil (Pro-Música Brasil)	6× Diamond	960,000^{‡}
Canada (Music Canada)	8× Platinum	640,000^{‡}
Denmark (IFPI Danmark)	2× Platinum	180,000^{‡}
France (SNEP)	Diamond	333,333^{‡}
Germany (BVMI)	Platinum	600,000^{‡}
Italy (FIMI)	Platinum	100,000^{‡}
New Zealand (RMNZ)	6× Platinum	180,000^{‡}
Poland (ZPAV)	3× Platinum	150,000^{‡}
Portugal (AFP)	5× Platinum	50,000^{‡}
Spain (Promusicae)	2× Platinum	120,000^{‡}
Switzerland (IFPI Switzerland)	2× Platinum	60,000^{‡}
United Kingdom (BPI)	5× Platinum	3,000,000^{‡}
United States (RIAA)	8× Platinum	8,000,000^{‡}
Streaming
Central America (CFC)	Gold	3,500,000^{†}
Czech Republic (ČNS IFPI)	Platinum	5,000,000^{†}
Greece (IFPI Greece)	4× Platinum	8,000,000^{†}
Japan (RIAJ)	Gold	50,000,000^{†}
Slovakia (ČNS IFPI)	Platinum	1,700,000^{†}
Sweden (GLF)	2× Platinum	24,000,000^{†}
Worldwide	—	1,790,000,000 (Note: (only streams equivalent))
^{‡} Sales+streaming figures based on certification alone.^{†} Streaming-only figures based on certification alone.

== Release history ==
Region	Date	Format(s)	Version	Label	Ref.
Various	April 11, 2024	Digital download; streaming	Original	Island	
United States	April 16, 2024	Contemporary hit radio	Original	Island	
United States	April 22, 2024	Hot adult contemporary radio	Original		
Italy	May 2, 2024	Radio airplay	Original	Universal	
United Kingdom	May 16, 2024	CD single		Polydor	
Various	May 17, 2024	Digital download; streaming	EP	Island	
Various	May 31, 2024	Digital download; streaming	Working late remixes	Island	
United States	June 10, 2024	7-inch single; cassette; CD single	Original; On vacation	Island	
United Kingdom	June 10, 2024	7-inch single; cassette	Original; On vacation	Polydor	
Brazil	June 10, 2024	7-inch single	Original; On vacation	Universal Brasil	
Canada	June 10, 2024	7-inch single	Original; On vacation	Universal Canada	
Japan	June 28, 2024	7-inch single	Original; On vacation	Universal Japan	
Various	July 4, 2025	12-inch single	Original; On vacation	Blood	

== See also ==
- List of best-selling singles in Australia
- List of best-selling singles in Brazil
- List of songs subject to plagiarism disputes
