= Saint-Baudelle =

- Commune
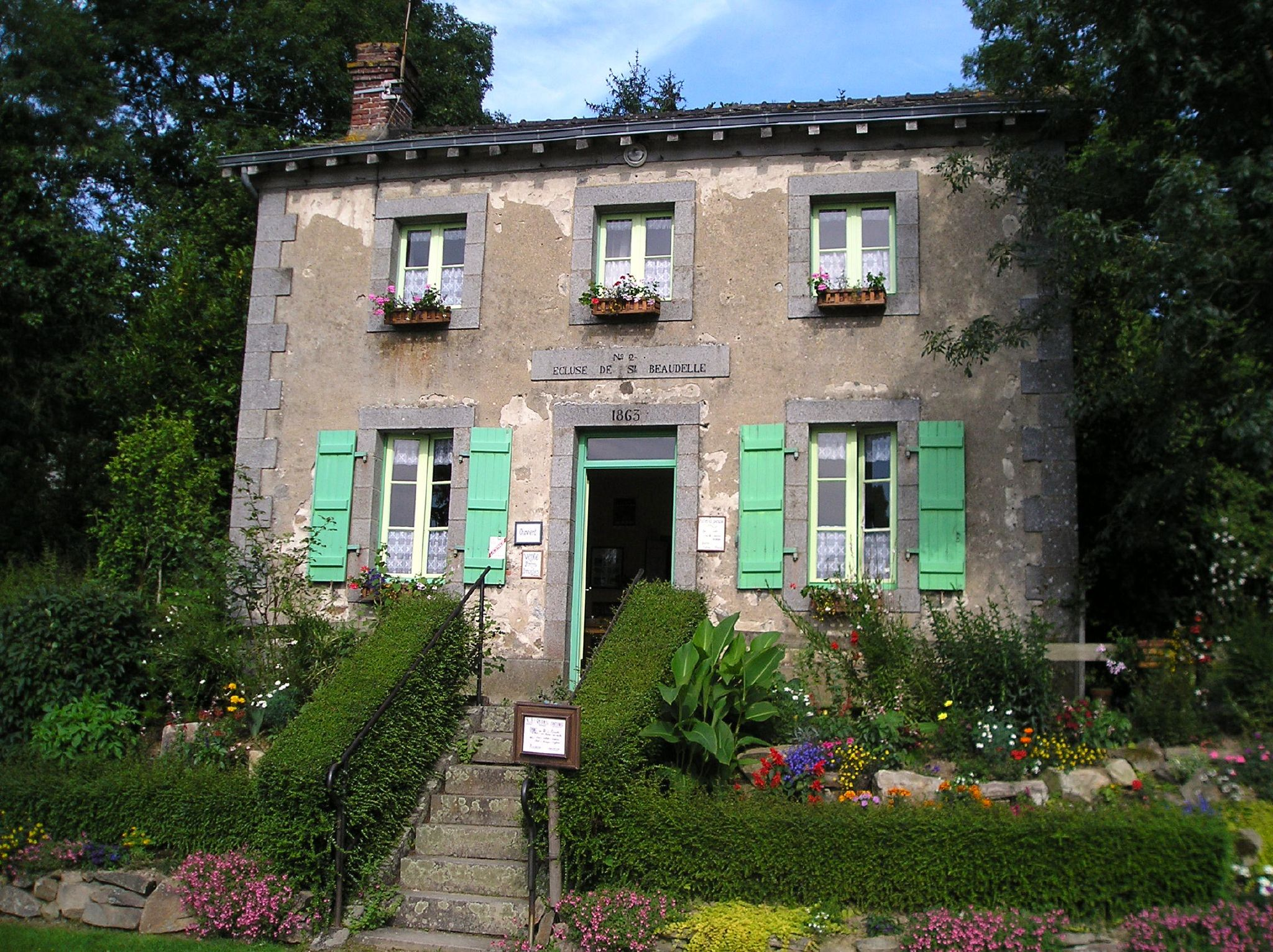
- The lock keepers cottage, in Saint-Baudelle
- Location of Saint-Baudelle
- Location within France Location within Pays de la Loire
- Coordinates: 48°16′55″N 0°38′06″W
- Country: France
- Region: Pays de la Loire
- Department: Mayenne
- Arrondissement: Mayenne
- Canton: Mayenne

Government
  - Mayor (2020–2026): Arnaud Bulenger
- Area^{1}: 7.17 km^{2} (2.77 sq mi)
- Elevation: 250 m (820 ft)
- Highest elevation: 159 m (522 ft)
- Lowest elevation: 82 m (269 ft)
- Population (2023): 1,189
  - Density: 166/km^{2} (429/sq mi)
- Time zone: UTC+01:00 (CET)
  - Summer (DST): UTC+02:00 (CEST)
- INSEE/Postal code: 53200 /53100
- ^{1} French Land Register data, which excludes lakes, ponds, glaciers > 1 km^{2} (0.386 sq mi or 247 acres) and river estuaries.

Saint-Baudelle (French pronunciation: [sɛ̃ bodɛl]) is a commune in the Mayenne department in north-western France.

== See also ==
- Communes of Mayenne
