= Parigné-sur-Braye =

- Commune
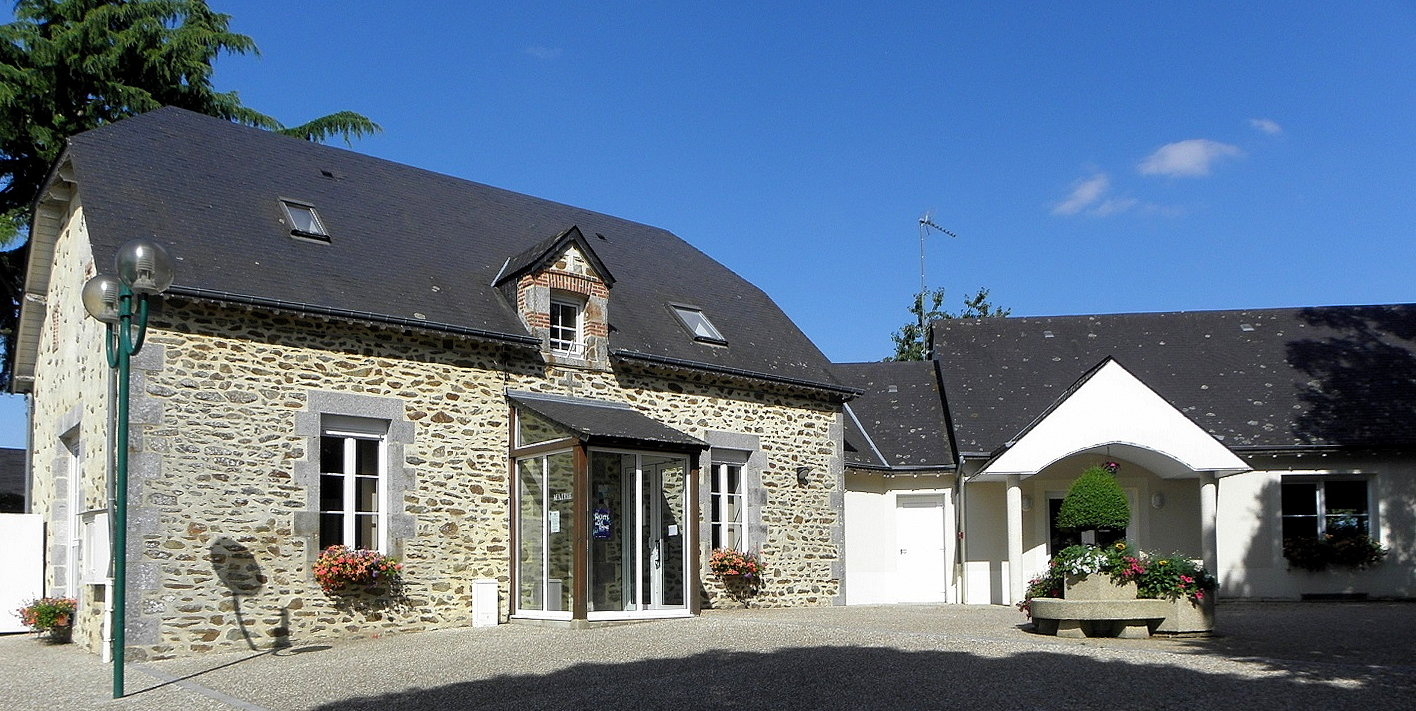
- Parigné-sur-Braye Town Hall
- Location of Parigné-sur-Braye
- Location within France Location within Pays de la Loire
- Coordinates: 48°19′01″N 0°39′06″W
- Country: France
- Region: Pays de la Loire
- Department: Mayenne
- Arrondissement: Mayenne
- Canton: Mayenne

Government
  - Mayor (2020–2026): Daniel Doyen
- Area^{1}: 9.88 km^{2} (3.81 sq mi)
- Elevation: 56 m (184 ft)
- Highest elevation: 173 m (568 ft)
- Lowest elevation: 98 m (322 ft)
- Population (2023): 848
  - Density: 85.8/km^{2} (222/sq mi)
- Time zone: UTC+01:00 (CET)
  - Summer (DST): UTC+02:00 (CEST)
- INSEE/Postal code: 53174 /53100
- ^{1} French Land Register data, which excludes lakes, ponds, glaciers > 1 km^{2} (0.386 sq mi or 247 acres) and river estuaries.

Parigné-sur-Braye (French pronunciation: [paʁiɲe syʁ bʁɛ], literally Parigné on Braye) is a commune in the Mayenne department in north-western France.

== See also ==
- Communes of Mayenne
