= La Croixille =

- Commune
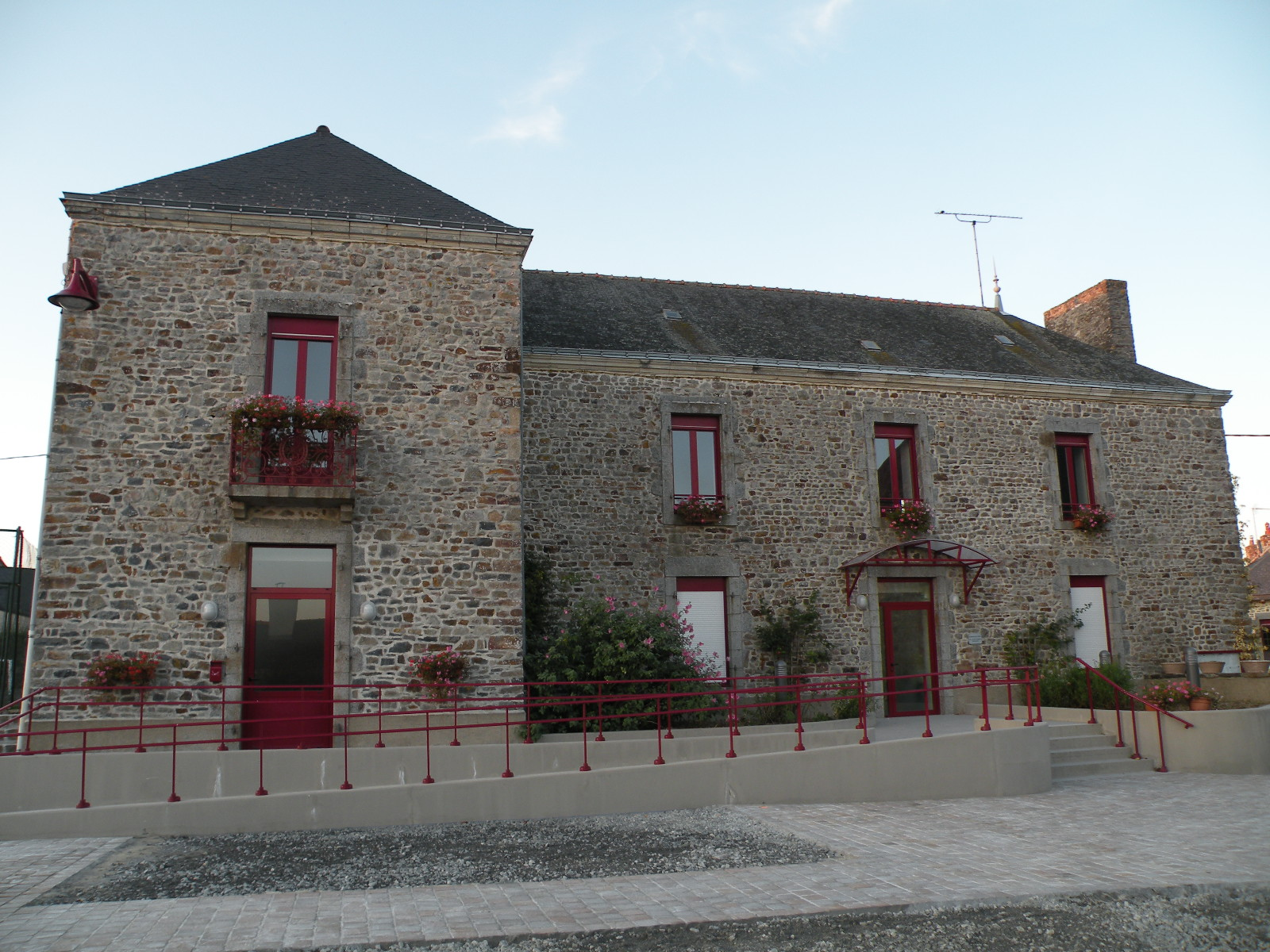
- The town hall in La Croixille
- Location of La Croixille
- Location within France Location within Pays de la Loire
- Coordinates: 48°12′21″N 1°03′16″W
- Country: France
- Region: Pays de la Loire
- Department: Mayenne
- Arrondissement: Mayenne
- Canton: Ernée

Government
  - Mayor (2020–2026): Serge Deshayes
- Area^{1}: 19.91 km^{2} (7.69 sq mi)
- Elevation: 180 m (590 ft)
- Highest elevation: 188 m (617 ft)
- Lowest elevation: 91 m (299 ft)
- Population (2023): 629
  - Density: 31.6/km^{2} (81.8/sq mi)
- Time zone: UTC+01:00 (CET)
  - Summer (DST): UTC+02:00 (CEST)
- INSEE/Postal code: 53086 /53380
- ^{1} French Land Register data, which excludes lakes, ponds, glaciers > 1 km^{2} (0.386 sq mi or 247 acres) and river estuaries.

La Croixille (French pronunciation: [la kʁwaksij]) is a commune in the Mayenne department in north-western France.

== See also ==
- Communes of the Mayenne department
