= Juvigné =

- Commune
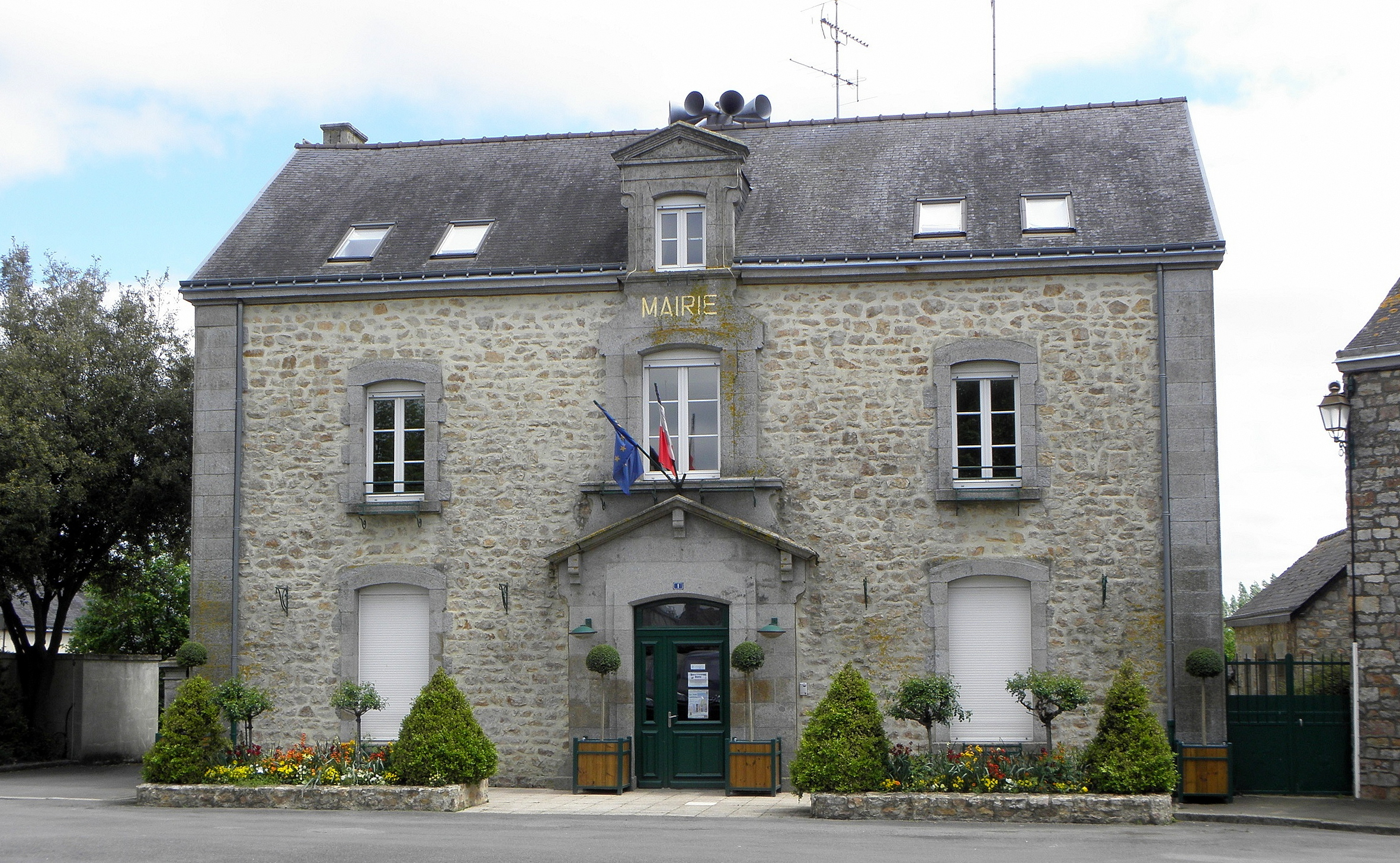
- Town hall
- Location of Juvigné
- Location within France Location within Pays de la Loire
- Coordinates: 48°13′50″N 1°01′59″W
- Country: France
- Region: Pays de la Loire
- Department: Mayenne
- Arrondissement: Mayenne
- Canton: Ernée

Government
  - Mayor (2020–2026): Régis Forveille
- Area^{1}: 62.16 km^{2} (24.00 sq mi)
- Elevation: 207 m (679 ft)
- Highest elevation: 224 m (735 ft)
- Lowest elevation: 113 m (371 ft)
- Population (2023): 1,327
  - Density: 21.35/km^{2} (55.29/sq mi)
- Time zone: UTC+01:00 (CET)
  - Summer (DST): UTC+02:00 (CEST)
- INSEE/Postal code: 53123 /53380
- ^{1} French Land Register data, which excludes lakes, ponds, glaciers > 1 km^{2} (0.386 sq mi or 247 acres) and river estuaries.

Juvigné (French pronunciation: [ʒyviɲe]) is a commune in the Mayenne department in north-western France.

It is located on the borders of Normandy, Brittany and the northern Loire and is predominantly an agricultural region known for its cattle rearing. The village is also known locally for being one of the prettiest in the region and is named the 'Village of Flowers' after its summer foral displays. It is also home to a small farming museum, and there is an impressive neo-classical church, presbytery and historic former school building in the village.

== See also ==
- Communes of the Mayenne department
