= Canton of Ernée =

Coordinates: 48.30°N 0.94°W

The canton of Erneé is an administrative division of the Mayenne department, northwestern France. Its borders were modified at the French canton reorganisation which came into effect in March 2015. Its seat is in Ernée.

It consists of the following communes:

1. Andouillé
2. La Baconnière
3. La Bigottière
4. Chailland
5. La Croixille
6. Ernée
7. Juvigné
8. Larchamp
9. Montenay
10. La Pellerine
11. Saint-Denis-de-Gastines
12. Saint-Germain-le-Guillaume
13. Saint-Hilaire-du-Maine
14. Saint-Pierre-des-Landes
15. Vautorte
