= Andouillé =

- Commune
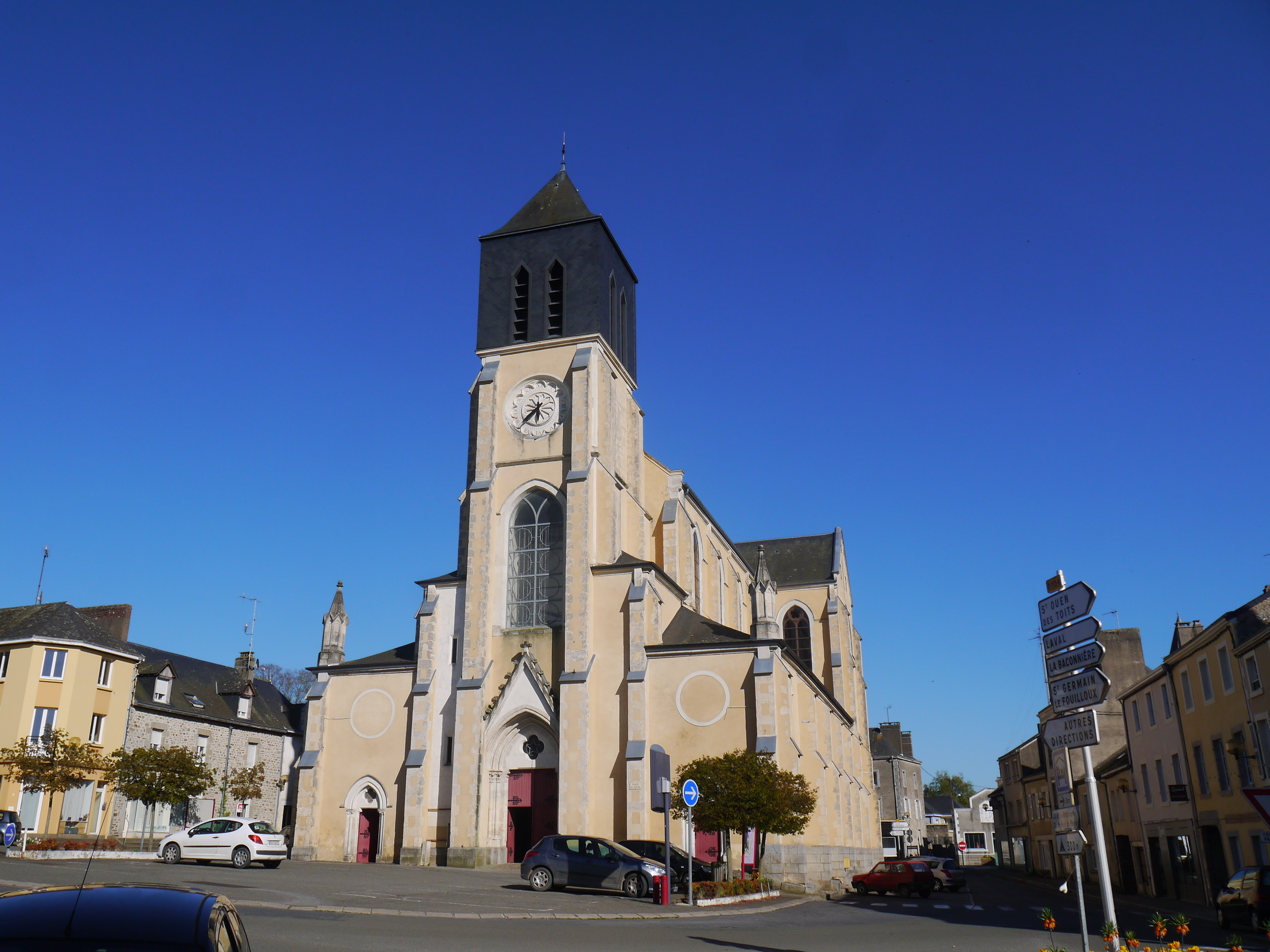
- Church of Saint Matthew

- Coat of arms
- Location of Andouillé
- Location within France Location within Pays de la Loire
- Coordinates: 48°11′00″N 0°47′00″W
- Country: France
- Region: Pays de la Loire
- Department: Mayenne
- Arrondissement: Mayenne
- Canton: Ernée
- Intercommunality: L'Ernée

Government
  - Mayor (2020–2026): Bertrand Lemaître
- Area^{1}: 36.54 km^{2} (14.11 sq mi)
- Elevation: 110 m (360 ft)
- Highest elevation: 155 m (509 ft)
- Lowest elevation: 52 m (171 ft)
- Population (2023): 2,321
  - Density: 63.52/km^{2} (164.5/sq mi)
- Time zone: UTC+01:00 (CET)
  - Summer (DST): UTC+02:00 (CEST)
- INSEE/Postal code: 53005 /53240
- ^{1} French Land Register data, which excludes lakes, ponds, glaciers > 1 km^{2} (0.386 sq mi or 247 acres) and river estuaries.

Andouillé (French pronunciation: [ɑ̃duje]) is a commune in the Mayenne department in northwestern France.

== Geography ==
Andouillé is located 15 kilometers from Laval, capital of the department of Mayenne, to which it is connected by the RD 131 and RD 115, and by the river, Mayenne. Bordered on the east by the Mayenne, it is crossed by the Ernée. The winding valley of the river is dominated by the hills of Saudraie and Lattan Crennes.

== Population ==
Historical population

Year	Pop.	±% p.a.
1793	2,447	—
1821	2,436	−0.02%
1846	3,023	+0.87%
1872	2,960	−0.08%
1901	2,444	−0.66%
1926	1,856	−1.09%
1946	1,804	−0.14%
1962	1,728	−0.27%
1968	1,691	−0.36%

Year	Pop.	±% p.a.
1975	1,746	+0.46%
1982	1,822	+0.61%
1990	1,926	+0.70%
1999	2,042	+0.65%
2007	2,321	+1.61%
2012	2,245	−0.66%
2017	2,300	+0.49%
2023	2,321	+0.15%

Source: EHESS and INSEE (1968–2023)

== International relations ==
Andouillé is twinned with the Nottinghamshire village of Farnsfield in England.

== See also ==
- Communes of Mayenne
