= Saint-Georges-Buttavent =

- Commune
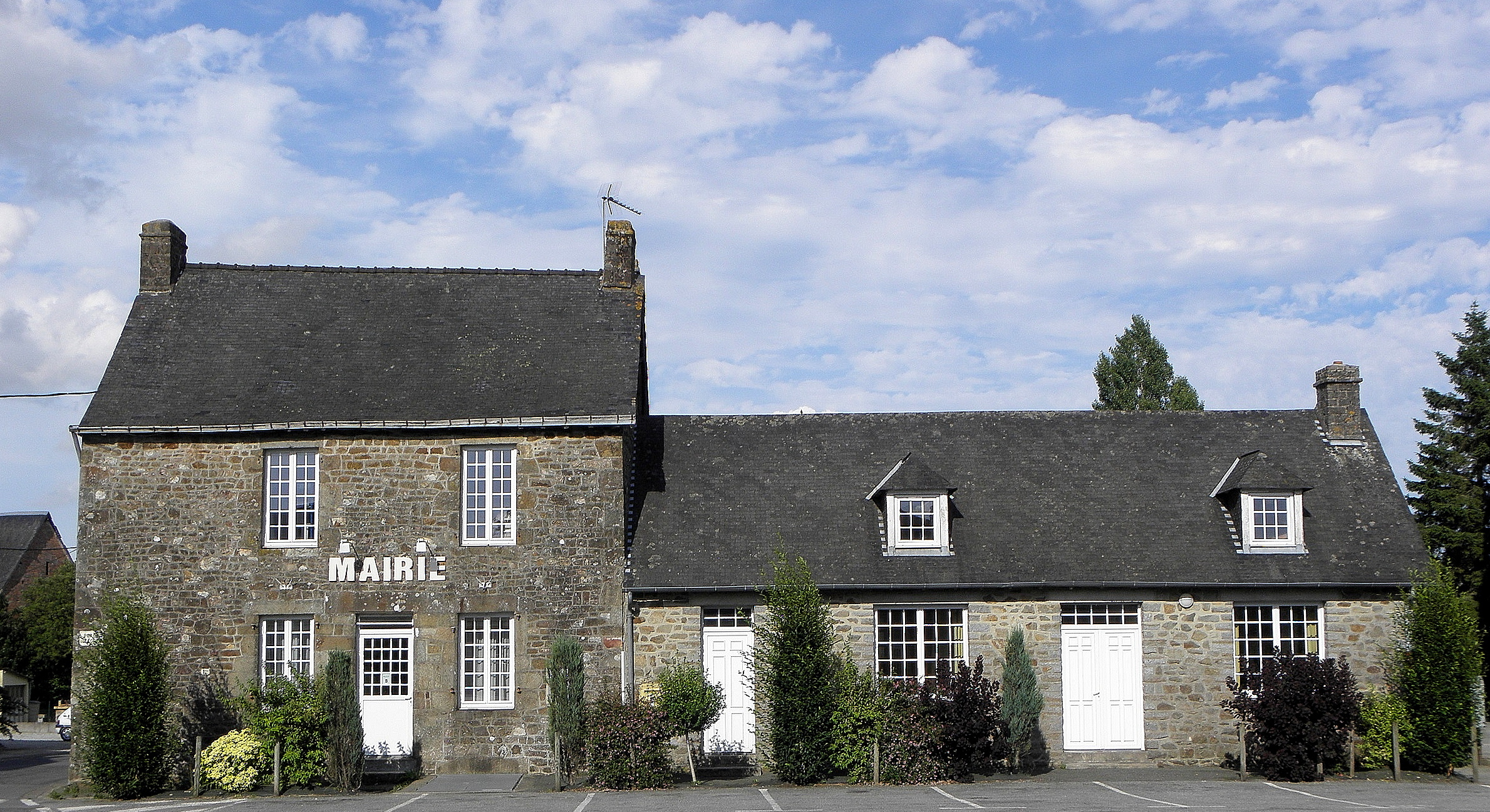
- Municipal office
- Location of Saint-Georges-Buttavent
- Location within France Location within Pays de la Loire
- Coordinates: 48°18′39″N 0°41′35″W
- Country: France
- Region: Pays de la Loire
- Department: Mayenne
- Arrondissement: Mayenne
- Canton: Mayenne

Government
  - Mayor (2020–2026): Gérard Brodin
- Area^{1}: 36.87 km^{2} (14.24 sq mi)
- Elevation: 124 m (407 ft)
- Highest elevation: 221 m (725 ft)
- Lowest elevation: 95 m (312 ft)
- Population (2023): 1,367
  - Density: 37.08/km^{2} (96.03/sq mi)
- Time zone: UTC+01:00 (CET)
  - Summer (DST): UTC+02:00 (CEST)
- INSEE/Postal code: 53219 /53100
- ^{1} French Land Register data, which excludes lakes, ponds, glaciers > 1 km^{2} (0.386 sq mi or 247 acres) and river estuaries.

Saint-Georges-Buttavent is a commune in the Mayenne department in north-western France.

The commune has three villages: Saint-Georges-Buttavent, Fontaine-Daniel and La-Chapelle-au-Grain.

== See also ==
- Communes of the Mayenne department
