= Larchamp, Mayenne =

Larchamp
- Commune
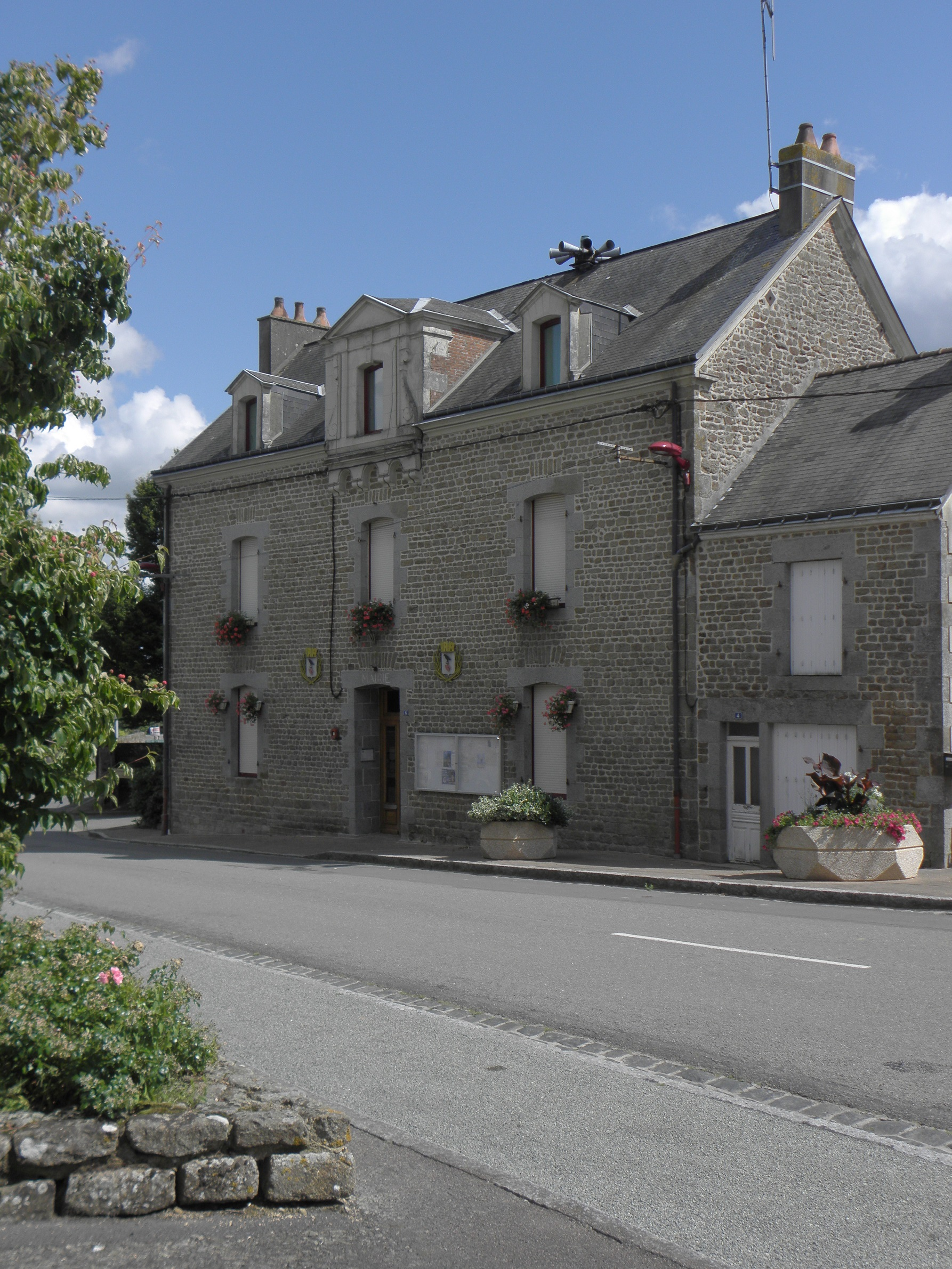
- The town hall in Larchamp

- Coat of arms
- Location of Larchamp
- Location within France Location within Pays de la Loire
- Coordinates: 48°21′46″N 0°59′50″W
- Country: France
- Region: Pays de la Loire
- Department: Mayenne
- Arrondissement: Mayenne
- Canton: Ernée

Government
  - Mayor (2020–2026): Constant Buchard
- Area^{1}: 40.17 km^{2} (15.51 sq mi)
- Elevation: 200 m (660 ft)
- Highest elevation: 249 m (817 ft)
- Lowest elevation: 127 m (417 ft)
- Population (2023): 1,001
  - Density: 24.92/km^{2} (64.54/sq mi)
- Time zone: UTC+01:00 (CET)
  - Summer (DST): UTC+02:00 (CEST)
- INSEE/Postal code: 53126 /53220
- ^{1} French Land Register data, which excludes lakes, ponds, glaciers > 1 km^{2} (0.386 sq mi or 247 acres) and river estuaries.

Larchamp (French pronunciation: [laʁʃɑ̃]) is a commune in the Mayenne department in north-western France.

== See also ==
- Communes of the Mayenne department
