= Canton of Mayenne =

Coordinates: 48.30°N 0.62°W

The canton of Mayenne is an administrative division of the Mayenne department, northwestern France. It was created at the French canton reorganisation which came into effect in March 2015. Its seat is in Mayenne.

It consists of the following communes:

1. Alexain
2. Contest
3. Mayenne
4. Parigné-sur-Braye
5. Placé
6. Saint-Baudelle
7. Saint-Georges-Buttavent
8. Saint-Germain-d'Anxure
