= Contest, Mayenne =

Contest
- Commune
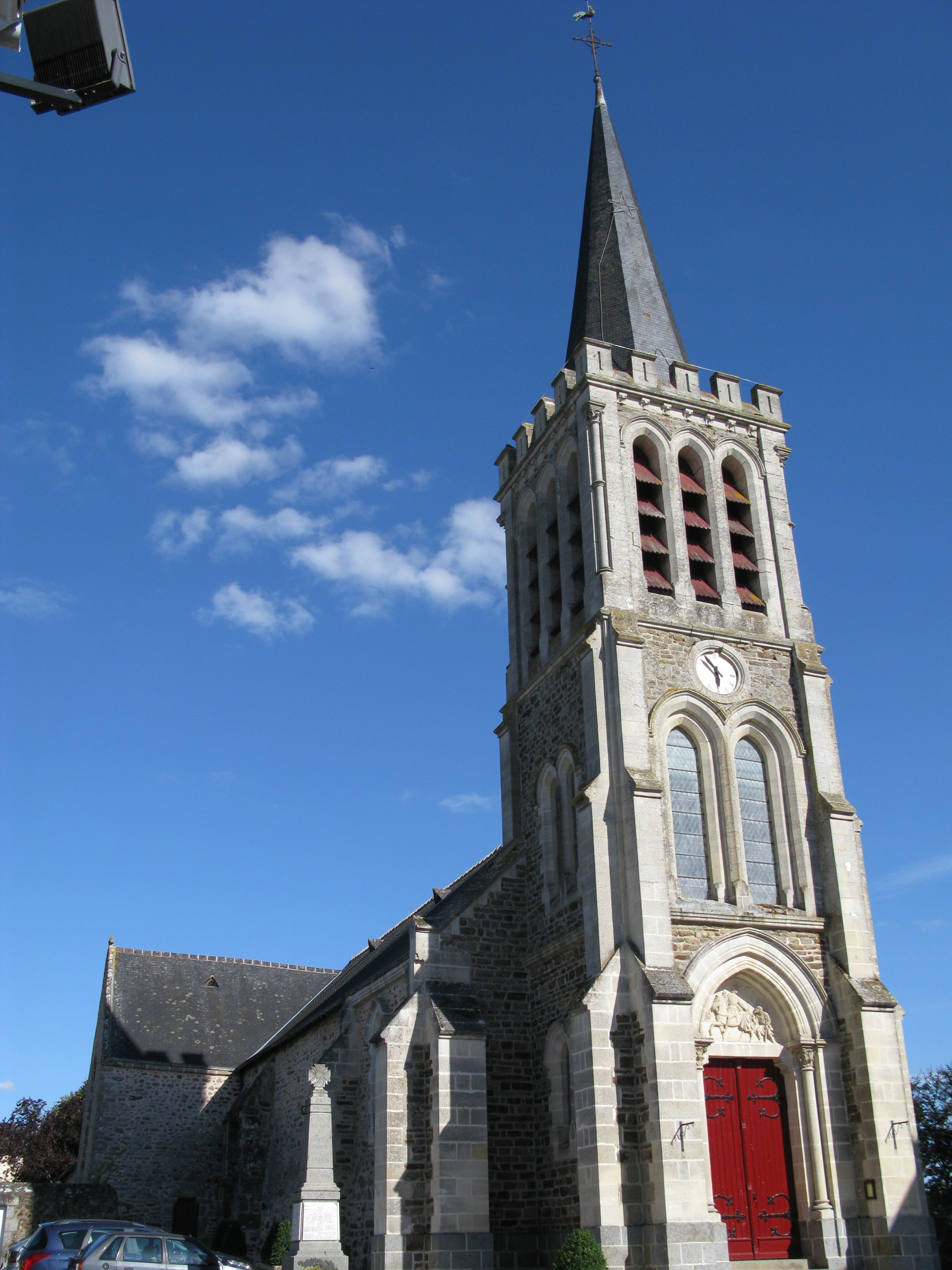
- The church in Contest

- Coat of arms
- Location of Contest
- Location within France Location within Pays de la Loire
- Coordinates: 48°15′46″N 0°39′18″W
- Country: France
- Region: Pays de la Loire
- Department: Mayenne
- Arrondissement: Mayenne
- Canton: Mayenne

Government
  - Mayor (2020–2026): Daniel Montaufray
- Area^{1}: 22.96 km^{2} (8.86 sq mi)
- Elevation: 109 m (358 ft)
- Highest elevation: 152 m (499 ft)
- Lowest elevation: 77 m (253 ft)
- Population (2023): 834
  - Density: 36.3/km^{2} (94.1/sq mi)
- Time zone: UTC+01:00 (CET)
  - Summer (DST): UTC+02:00 (CEST)
- INSEE/Postal code: 53074 /53100
- ^{1} French Land Register data, which excludes lakes, ponds, glaciers > 1 km^{2} (0.386 sq mi or 247 acres) and river estuaries.

Contest is a commune in the Mayenne department in north-western France.

The town is in the center of Lower Maine. Its village is 6 km south-west of Mayenne and 12 km north of Martigné-sur-Mayenne.

The name of the locality is attested in the form Constet in 1207. The place name honors the bishop of Bayeux of the sixth century, Contextus.

== Notable Persons ==
- Jacques Felix Jan de La Hamelinaye (1769–1861), general, retired to Contest at his retirement.
- Bertrand Denis (1902–1986 in Contest), MP.
- Louis Rouland (1907–1940), French aviator born in Contest.
- Jean Yanne (1933–2003), actor, humorist, director. Born Roger-Jean Gouyé, from a family of clog makers who in the eighteenth century lived in the forest of Mayenne. His grandfather René-Jean Gouillet was born in Contest on 13 March 1789, and died in Fougères on 11 October 1855.

== See also ==
- Communes of the Mayenne department
