= La Pellerine, Mayenne =

La Pellerine
- Commune
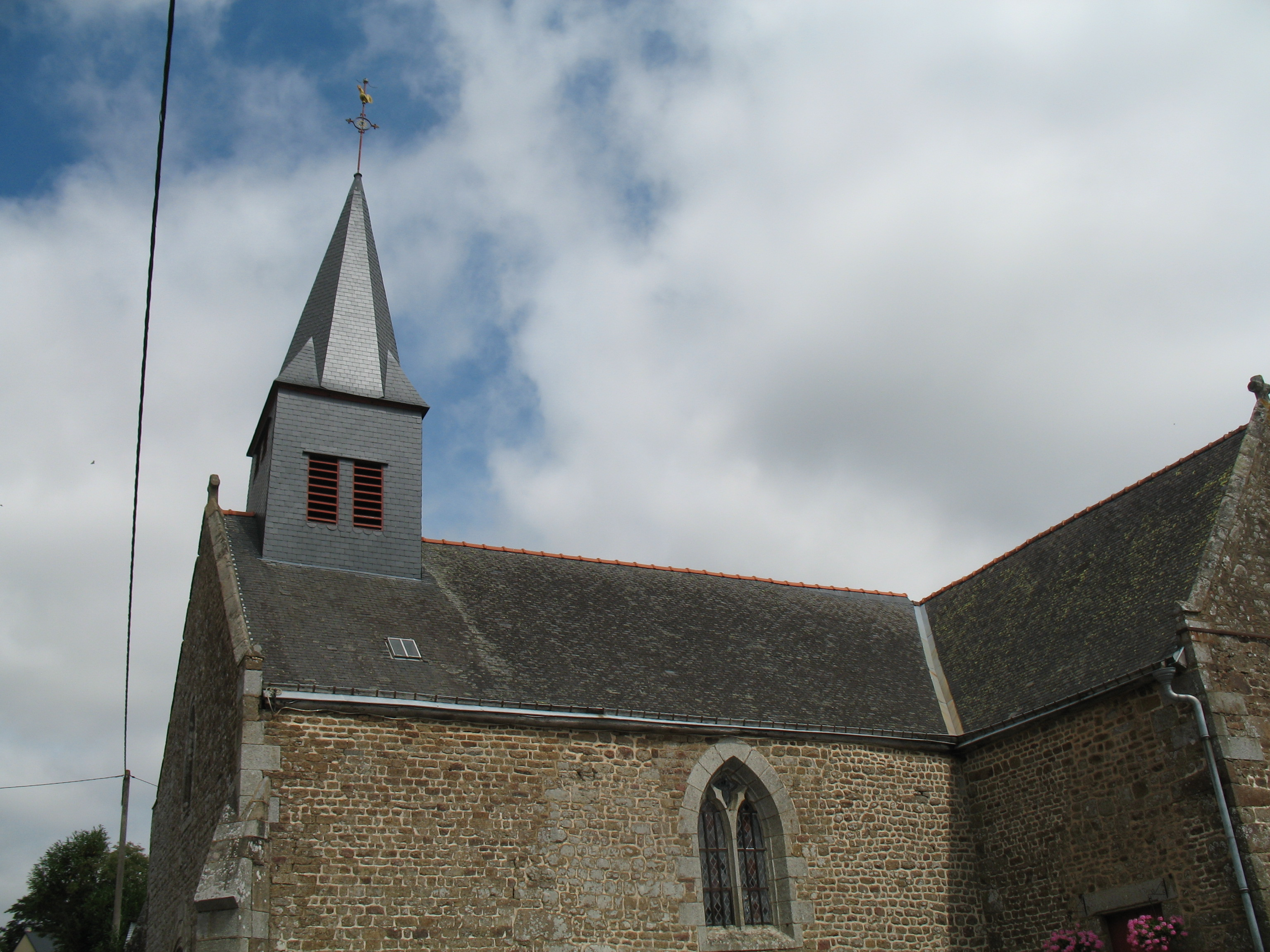
- The church in La Pellerine
- Location of La Pellerine
- Location within France Location within Pays de la Loire
- Coordinates: 48°18′56″N 1°02′59″W
- Country: France
- Region: Pays de la Loire
- Department: Mayenne
- Arrondissement: Mayenne
- Canton: Ernée

Government
  - Mayor (2020–2026): Fernand Coget
- Area^{1}: 8.18 km^{2} (3.16 sq mi)
- Elevation: 208 m (682 ft)
- Highest elevation: 236 m (774 ft)
- Lowest elevation: 158 m (518 ft)
- Population (2023): 297
  - Density: 36.3/km^{2} (94.0/sq mi)
- Time zone: UTC+01:00 (CET)
  - Summer (DST): UTC+02:00 (CEST)
- INSEE/Postal code: 53177 /53220
- ^{1} French Land Register data, which excludes lakes, ponds, glaciers > 1 km^{2} (0.386 sq mi or 247 acres) and river estuaries.

La Pellerine (French pronunciation: [la pɛlʁin]) is a commune in the Mayenne department in north-western France.

== See also ==
- Communes of Mayenne
