= Saint-Denis-de-Gastines =

- Commune
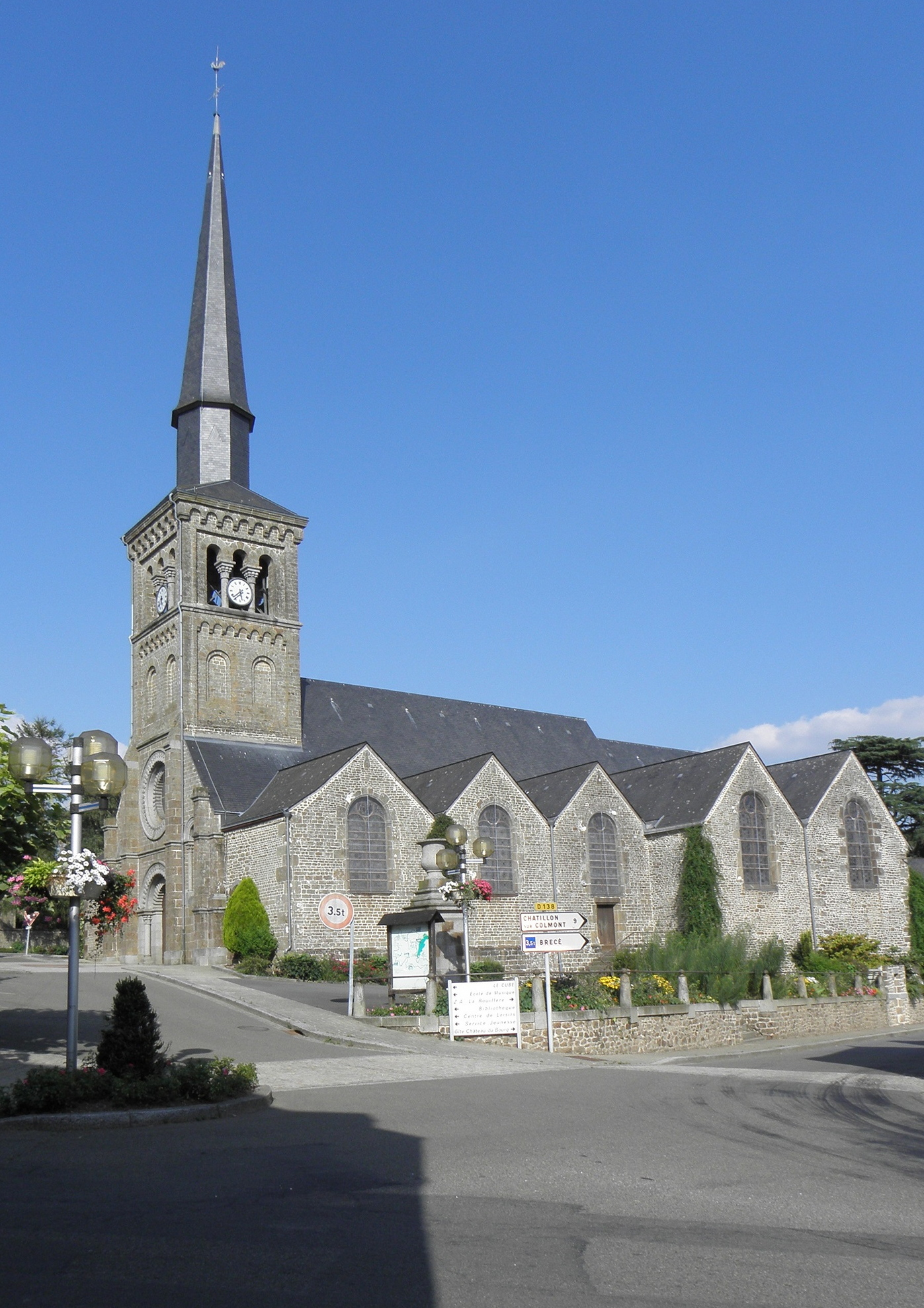
- The church in Saint-Denis-de-Gastines
- Location of Saint-Denis-de-Gastines
- Location within France Location within Pays de la Loire
- Coordinates: 48°20′34″N 0°51′22″W
- Country: France
- Region: Pays de la Loire
- Department: Mayenne
- Arrondissement: Mayenne
- Canton: Ernée
- Intercommunality: Ernée

Government
  - Mayor (2020–2026): Thierry Chrétien
- Area^{1}: 48.01 km^{2} (18.54 sq mi)
- Elevation: 176 m (577 ft)
- Highest elevation: 247 m (810 ft)
- Lowest elevation: 128 m (420 ft)
- Population (2023): 1,463
  - Density: 30.47/km^{2} (78.92/sq mi)
- Time zone: UTC+01:00 (CET)
  - Summer (DST): UTC+02:00 (CEST)
- INSEE/Postal code: 53211 /53500
- ^{1} French Land Register data, which excludes lakes, ponds, glaciers > 1 km^{2} (0.386 sq mi or 247 acres) and river estuaries.

Saint-Denis-de-Gastines (French pronunciation: [sɛ̃ dəni də ɡastin]) is a commune in the Mayenne department in north-western France.

== Notable person ==
- Pierre Fauchard (1679–1761), the "father of modern dentistry", was born in Saint-Denis-de-Gastines

== See also ==
- Communes of Mayenne
