= Saint-Pierre-des-Landes =

- Commune
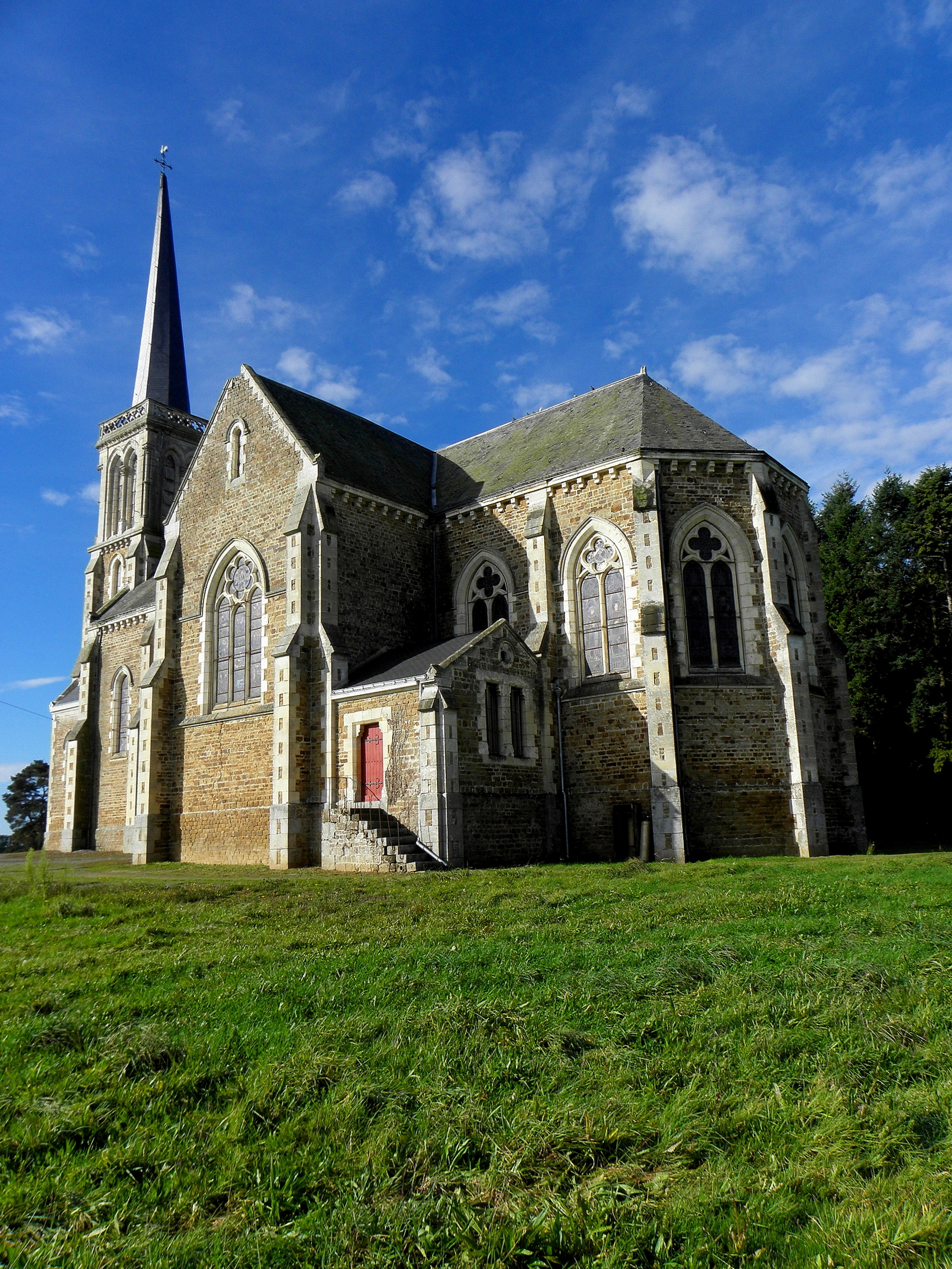
- The church of Our Lady of the Assumption of Mégaudais, in Saint-Pierre-des-Landes
- Location of Saint-Pierre-des-Landes
- Location within France Location within Pays de la Loire
- Coordinates: 48°16′29″N 1°01′37″W
- Country: France
- Region: Pays de la Loire
- Department: Mayenne
- Arrondissement: Mayenne
- Canton: Ernée
- Intercommunality: Ernée

Government
  - Mayor (2020–2026): Joannick Lebon
- Area^{1}: 40.9 km^{2} (15.8 sq mi)
- Elevation: 151 m (495 ft)
- Highest elevation: 219 m (719 ft)
- Lowest elevation: 113 m (371 ft)
- Population (2023): 923
  - Density: 22.6/km^{2} (58.4/sq mi)
- Time zone: UTC+01:00 (CET)
  - Summer (DST): UTC+02:00 (CEST)
- INSEE/Postal code: 53245 /53500
- ^{1} French Land Register data, which excludes lakes, ponds, glaciers > 1 km^{2} (0.386 sq mi or 247 acres) and river estuaries.

Saint-Pierre-des-Landes (French pronunciation: [sɛ̃ pjɛʁ de lɑ̃d]) is a commune in the Mayenne department in north-western France.

Amenities: Small supermarket, boulangerie, infant school, dechetterie, repair garage, hairdresser, Mairie, fire station, small War Memorial, public toilets, small fishing lake

== See also ==
- Communes of the Mayenne department
