= Saint-Germain-le-Guillaume =

- Commune
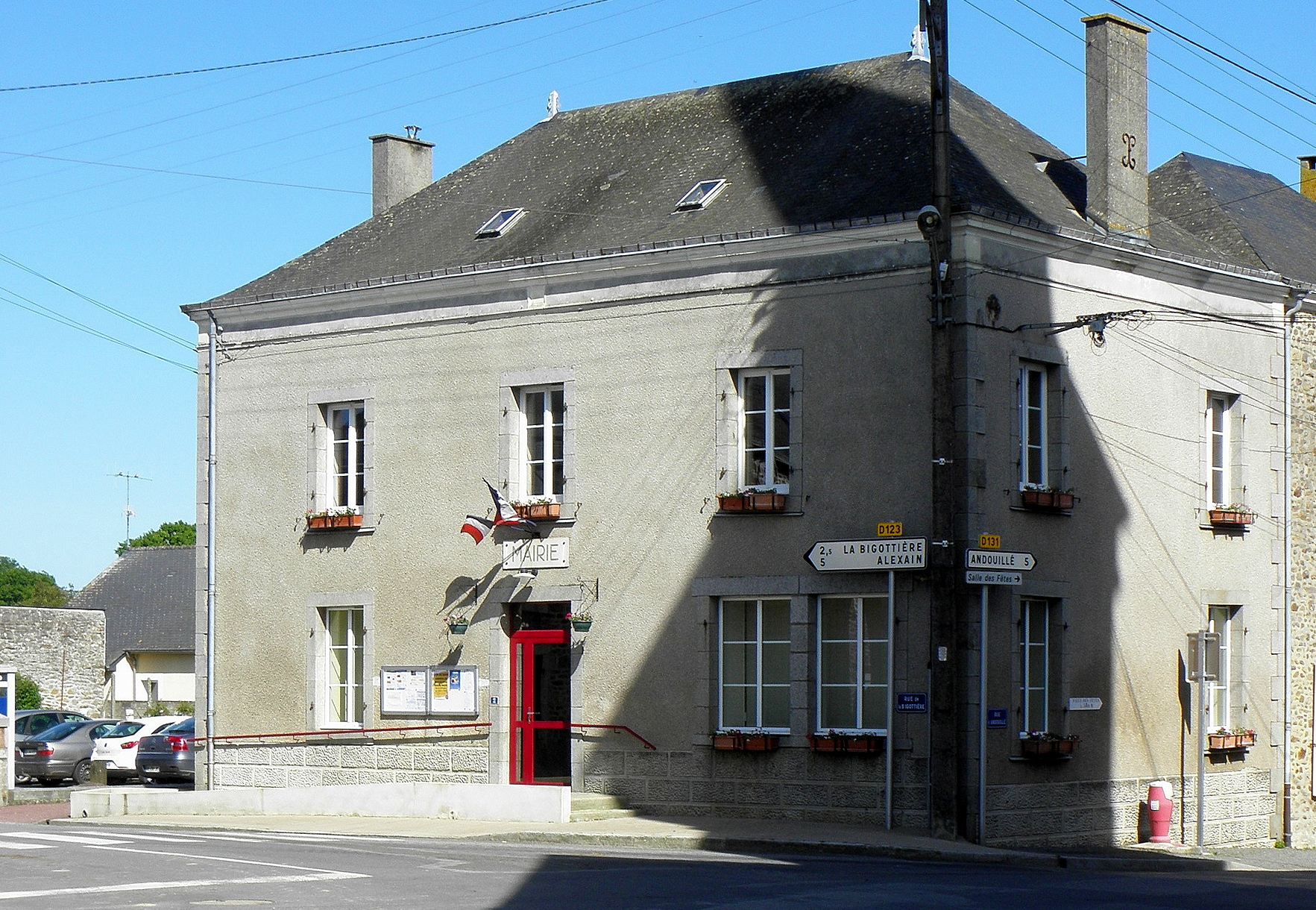
- Town hall
- Location of Saint-Germain-le-Guillaume
- Location within France Location within Pays de la Loire
- Coordinates: 48°12′24″N 0°49′27″W
- Country: France
- Region: Pays de la Loire
- Department: Mayenne
- Arrondissement: Mayenne
- Canton: Ernée
- Intercommunality: Ernée

Government
  - Mayor (2020–2026): Aude Roby
- Area^{1}: 13.23 km^{2} (5.11 sq mi)
- Elevation: 100 m (330 ft)
- Highest elevation: 168 m (551 ft)
- Lowest elevation: 73 m (240 ft)
- Population (2023): 507
  - Density: 38.3/km^{2} (99.3/sq mi)
- Time zone: UTC+01:00 (CET)
  - Summer (DST): UTC+02:00 (CEST)
- INSEE/Postal code: 53225 /53240
- ^{1} French Land Register data, which excludes lakes, ponds, glaciers > 1 km^{2} (0.386 sq mi or 247 acres) and river estuaries.

Saint-Germain-le-Guillaume (French pronunciation: [sɛ̃ ʒɛʁmɛ̃ lə ɡijom]) is a commune in the Mayenne department in north-western France.

== See also ==
- Communes of the Mayenne department
