= Vautorte =

- Commune
- Location of Vautorte
- Location within France Location within Pays de la Loire
- Coordinates: 48°18′04″N 0°49′54″W
- Country: France
- Region: Pays de la Loire
- Department: Mayenne
- Arrondissement: Mayenne
- Canton: Ernée

Government
  - Mayor (2020–2026): Gilles Ligot
- Area^{1}: 23.64 km^{2} (9.13 sq mi)
- Elevation: 215 m (705 ft)
- Highest elevation: 221 m (725 ft)
- Lowest elevation: 114 m (374 ft)
- Population (2023): 607
  - Density: 25.7/km^{2} (66.5/sq mi)
- Time zone: UTC+01:00 (CET)
  - Summer (DST): UTC+02:00 (CEST)
- INSEE/Postal code: 53269 /53500
- ^{1} French Land Register data, which excludes lakes, ponds, glaciers > 1 km^{2} (0.386 sq mi or 247 acres) and river estuaries.

Vautorte (French pronunciation: [votɔʁt]) is a commune in the Mayenne department in north-western France.

== See also ==
- Communes of the Mayenne department
