= Levaré =

- Commune
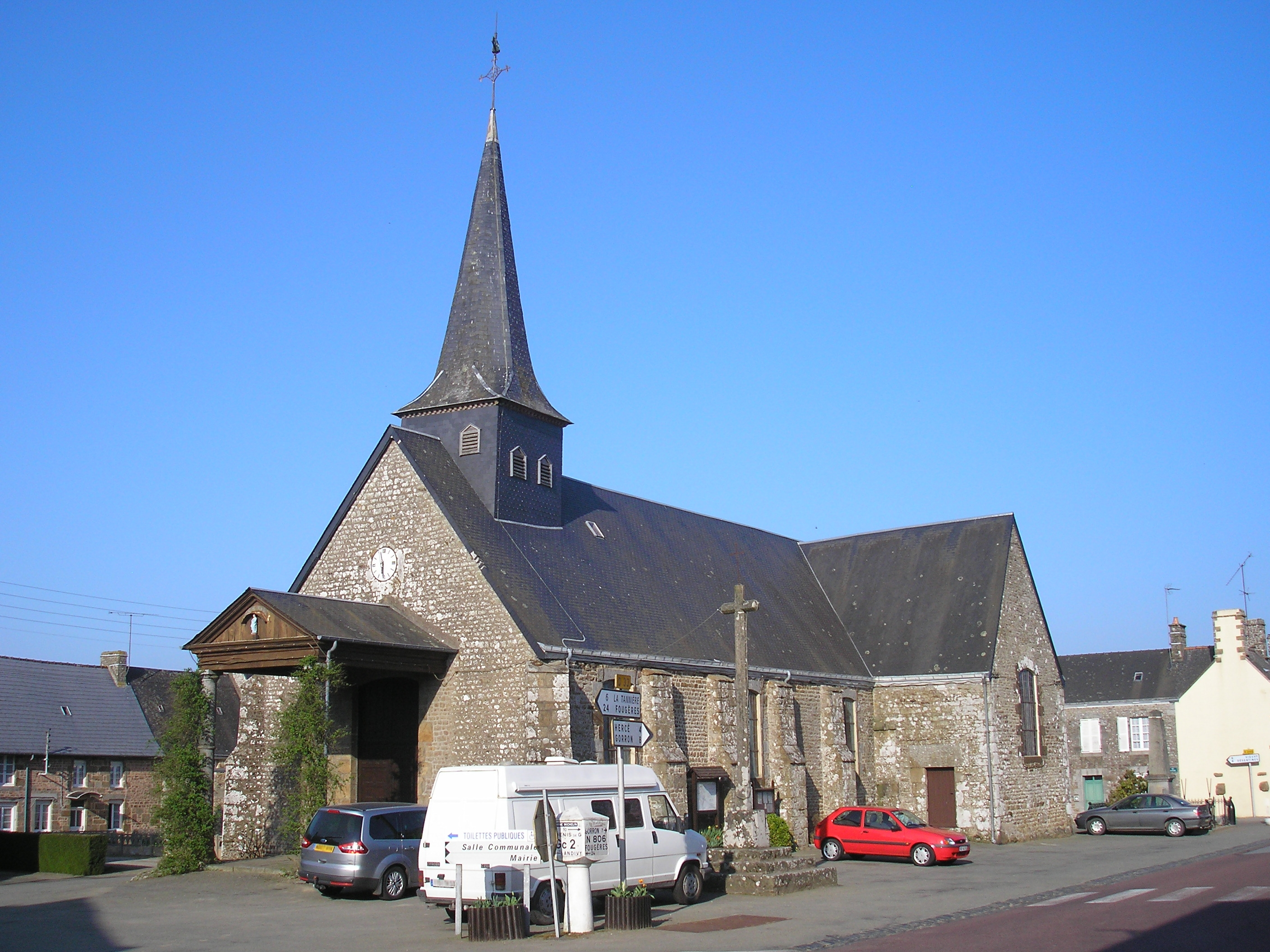
- The church of Saint-Victeur, in Levaré
- Location of Levaré
- Location within France Location within Pays de la Loire
- Coordinates: 48°25′07″N 0°54′46″W
- Country: France
- Region: Pays de la Loire
- Department: Mayenne
- Arrondissement: Mayenne
- Canton: Gorron

Government
  - Mayor (2020–2026): Patrick Desmaires
- Area^{1}: 11.53 km^{2} (4.45 sq mi)
- Elevation: 220 m (720 ft)
- Highest elevation: 246 m (807 ft)
- Lowest elevation: 183 m (600 ft)
- Population (2023): 269
  - Density: 23.3/km^{2} (60.4/sq mi)
- Time zone: UTC+01:00 (CET)
  - Summer (DST): UTC+02:00 (CEST)
- INSEE/Postal code: 53132 /53120
- ^{1} French Land Register data, which excludes lakes, ponds, glaciers > 1 km^{2} (0.386 sq mi or 247 acres) and river estuaries.

Levaré (French pronunciation: [ləvaʁe]) is a commune in the Mayenne department in north-western France.

== See also ==
- Communes of the Mayenne department
