= Saint-Germain-d'Anxure =

- Commune
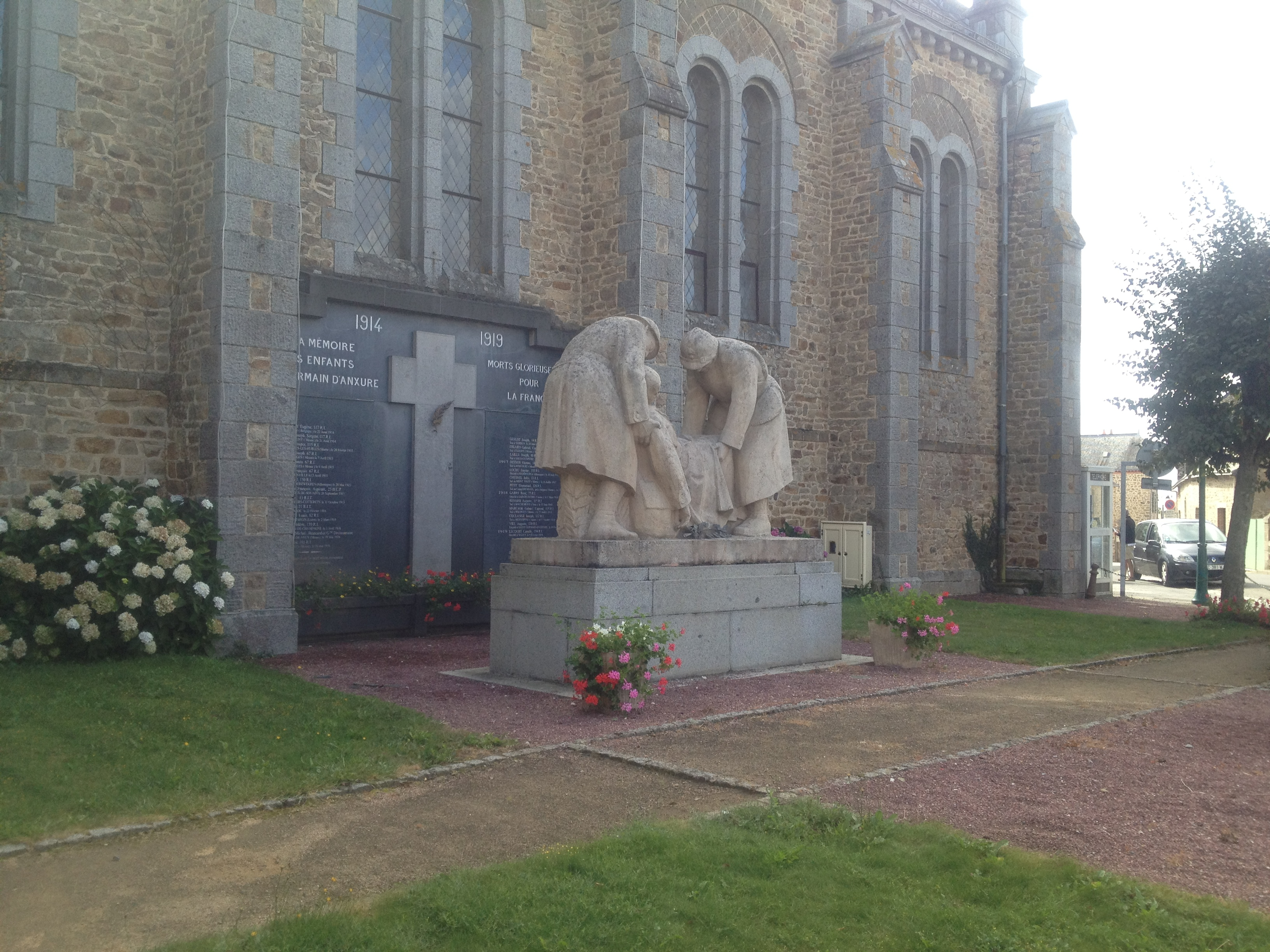
- The war memorial in Saint-Germain d'Anxure
- Location of Saint-Germain-d'Anxure
- Location within France Location within Pays de la Loire
- Coordinates: 48°13′20″N 0°44′01″W
- Country: France
- Region: Pays de la Loire
- Department: Mayenne
- Arrondissement: Mayenne
- Canton: Mayenne
- Intercommunality: CC Mayenne Communauté

Government
  - Mayor (2020–2026): Éric Transon
- Area^{1}: 10.35 km^{2} (4.00 sq mi)
- Elevation: 115 m (377 ft)
- Highest elevation: 134 m (440 ft)
- Lowest elevation: 67 m (220 ft)
- Population (2023): 354
  - Density: 34.2/km^{2} (88.6/sq mi)
- Time zone: UTC+01:00 (CET)
  - Summer (DST): UTC+02:00 (CEST)
- INSEE/Postal code: 53222 /53240
- ^{1} French Land Register data, which excludes lakes, ponds, glaciers > 1 km^{2} (0.386 sq mi or 247 acres) and river estuaries.

Saint-Germain-d'Anxure is a commune in the Mayenne department in northwestern France.

== See also ==
- Communes of the Mayenne department
