= Placé =

- Commune
- Location of Placé
- Location within France Location within Pays de la Loire
- Coordinates: 48°15′16″N 0°46′33″W
- Country: France
- Region: Pays de la Loire
- Department: Mayenne
- Arrondissement: Mayenne
- Canton: Mayenne

Government
  - Mayor (2020–2026): Patricia Gontier
- Area^{1}: 25.25 km^{2} (9.75 sq mi)
- Elevation: 188 m (617 ft)
- Highest elevation: 201 m (659 ft)
- Lowest elevation: 108 m (354 ft)
- Population (2023): 359
  - Density: 14.2/km^{2} (36.8/sq mi)
- Time zone: UTC+01:00 (CET)
  - Summer (DST): UTC+02:00 (CEST)
- INSEE/Postal code: 53179 /53240
- ^{1} French Land Register data, which excludes lakes, ponds, glaciers > 1 km^{2} (0.386 sq mi or 247 acres) and river estuaries.

Placé (French pronunciation: [plase]) is a commune in the Mayenne department in north-western France.

== See also ==
- Communes of Mayenne
