= Saint-Hilaire-du-Maine =

- Commune
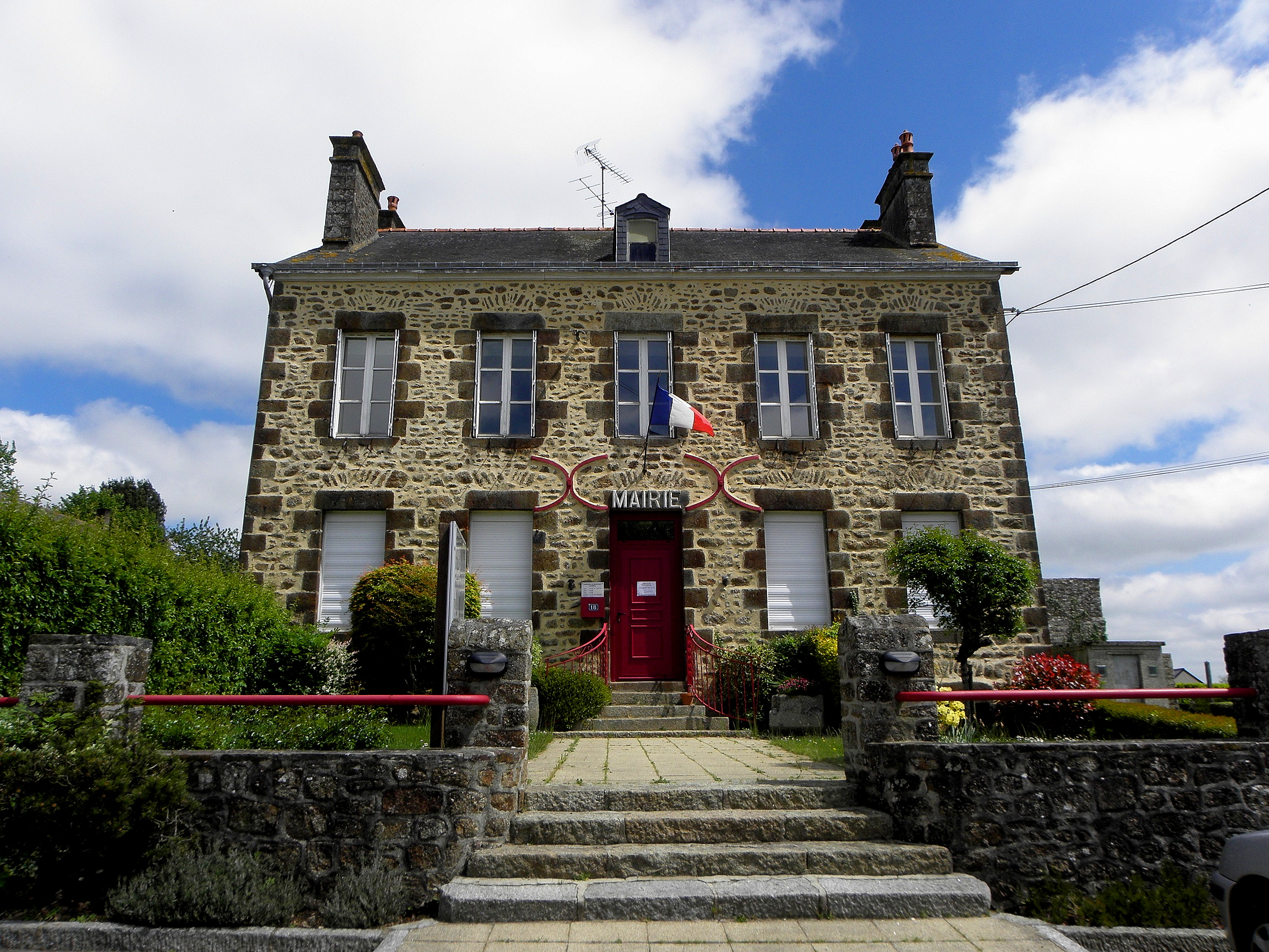
- Saint-Hilaire-du-Maine Town Hall
- Location of Saint-Hilaire-du-Maine
- Location within France Location within Pays de la Loire
- Coordinates: 48°13′37″N 0°55′43″W
- Country: France
- Region: Pays de la Loire
- Department: Mayenne
- Arrondissement: Mayenne
- Canton: Ernée
- Intercommunality: Ernée

Government
  - Mayor (2023–2026): Sandrine Crottereau-Ragaru
- Area^{1}: 31.06 km^{2} (11.99 sq mi)
- Elevation: 180 m (590 ft)
- Highest elevation: 224 m (735 ft)
- Lowest elevation: 97 m (318 ft)
- Population (2023): 797
  - Density: 25.7/km^{2} (66.5/sq mi)
- Time zone: UTC+01:00 (CET)
  - Summer (DST): UTC+02:00 (CEST)
- INSEE/Postal code: 53226 /53380
- ^{1} French Land Register data, which excludes lakes, ponds, glaciers > 1 km^{2} (0.386 sq mi or 247 acres) and river estuaries.

Saint-Hilaire-du-Maine (French pronunciation: [sɛ̃.t‿ilɛʁ dy mɛn], literally Saint-Hilaire of the Maine) is a commune in the Mayenne department in northwestern France. The writer and photographer Jean-Loup Trassard was born in Saint-Hilaire-du-Maine in 1933.

== See also ==
- Communes of the Mayenne department
