= La Bigottière =

- Commune
- Coat of arms
- Location of La Bigottière
- Location within France Location within Pays de la Loire
- Coordinates: 48°13′10″N 0°47′52″W
- Country: France
- Region: Pays de la Loire
- Department: Mayenne
- Arrondissement: Mayenne
- Canton: Ernée

Government
  - Mayor (2020–2026): Véronica Bignon
- Area^{1}: 18.40 km^{2} (7.10 sq mi)
- Elevation: 150 m (490 ft)
- Highest elevation: 183 m (600 ft)
- Lowest elevation: 93 m (305 ft)
- Population (2023): 489
  - Density: 26.6/km^{2} (68.8/sq mi)
- Time zone: UTC+01:00 (CET)
  - Summer (DST): UTC+02:00 (CEST)
- INSEE/Postal code: 53031 /53240
- ^{1} French Land Register data, which excludes lakes, ponds, glaciers > 1 km^{2} (0.386 sq mi or 247 acres) and river estuaries.

La Bigottière (French pronunciation: [la biɡɔtjɛʁ]) is a commune in the Mayenne department in northwestern France.

== Population ==
Historical population
| Year | Pop. | ±% p.a. |
|---|---|---|
| 1968 | 407 | — |
| 1975 | 383 | −0.86% |
| 1982 | 342 | −1.60% |
| 1990 | 349 | +0.25% |
| 1999 | 331 | −0.59% |
| 2007 | 390 | +2.07% |
| 2012 | 486 | +4.50% |
| 2017 | 498 | +0.49% |
| 2023 | 489 | −0.30% |
Source: INSEE

== See also ==
- Communes of Mayenne
