= Montenay =

- Commune
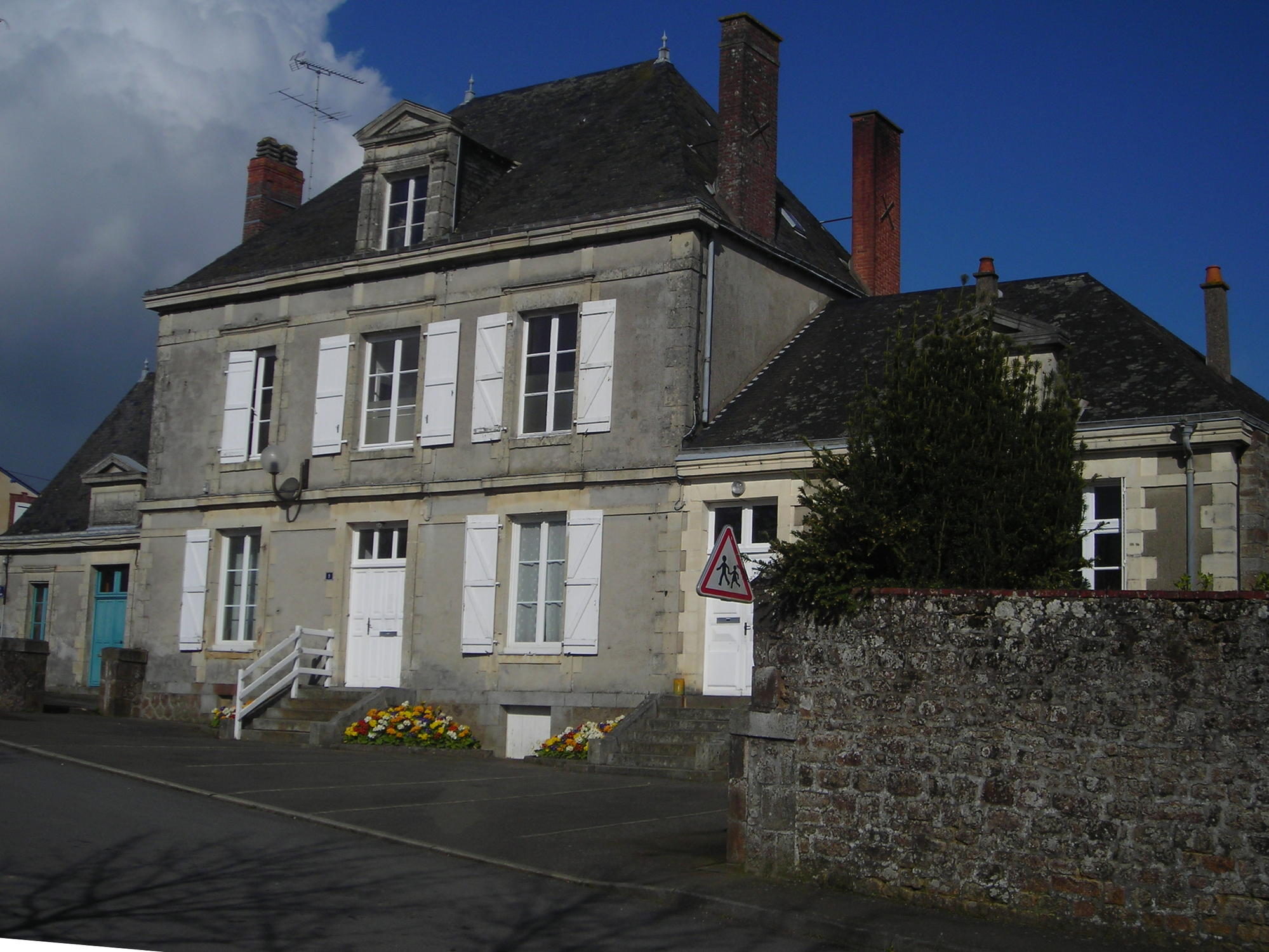
- The old town hall in Montenay
- Location of Montenay
- Location within France Location within Pays de la Loire
- Coordinates: 48°17′21″N 0°53′29″W
- Country: France
- Region: Pays de la Loire
- Department: Mayenne
- Arrondissement: Mayenne
- Canton: Ernée

Government
  - Mayor (2020–2026): Gervais Hameau
- Area^{1}: 37.20 km^{2} (14.36 sq mi)
- Elevation: 109 m (358 ft)
- Highest elevation: 208 m (682 ft)
- Lowest elevation: 94 m (308 ft)
- Population (2023): 1,291
  - Density: 34.70/km^{2} (89.88/sq mi)
- Time zone: UTC+01:00 (CET)
  - Summer (DST): UTC+02:00 (CEST)
- INSEE/Postal code: 53155 /53500
- ^{1} French Land Register data, which excludes lakes, ponds, glaciers > 1 km^{2} (0.386 sq mi or 247 acres) and river estuaries.

Montenay (French pronunciation: [mɔ̃tnɛ]) is a commune in the Mayenne department in north-western France.

== See also ==
- Communes of Mayenne
