= Jean-Loup Trassard =

French writer and photographer (1933–2026)

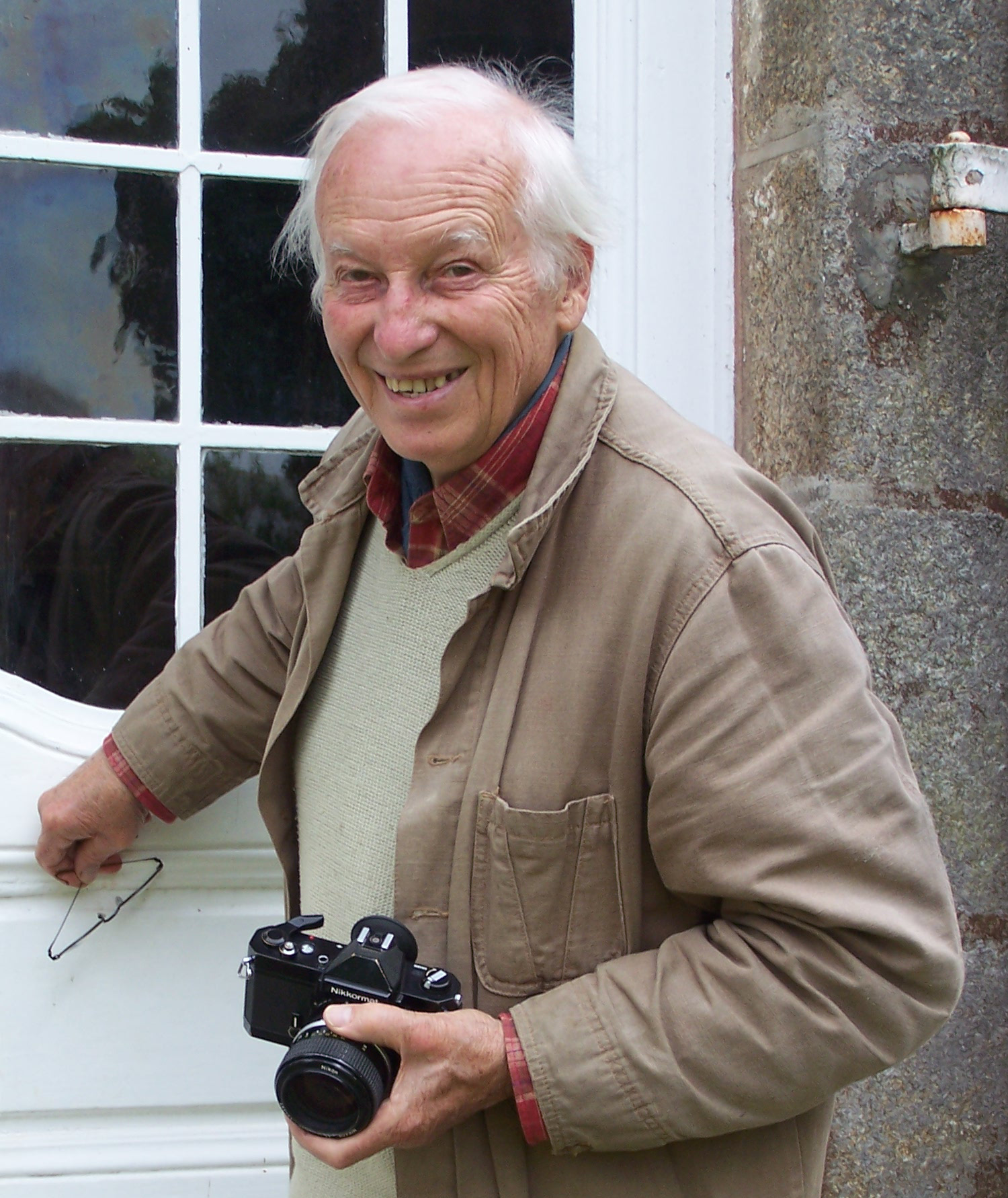
Trassard in 2008

Jean-Loup Trassard (11 August 1933 – 13 January 2026) was a French writer and photographer.

Trassard viewed himself as a "writer of agriculture." From 1961, he published short texts, narratives, photographs and texts in which he recounted his "territory" by Gallimard and Le Temps qu'il fait. The vision he offered of the traditional rural civilization, which disappears irrevocably, is viewed as being both ethnological and poetic.

In 2012, he was awarded the grand prix of the Société des gens de lettres Magdeleine-Cluzel for the entirety of his work.

== Early life and education ==
Trassard was born in Saint-Hilaire-du-Maine on 11 August 1933. His father, René, was an entrepreneur ("fermier de droits de place" - "communal farmer"-) on the markets, which was a service to the communes organizing markets, in Brittany and in Normandy. He was a single child who went to the secular school of the village. Catechism, communions and masses were little appreciated.

He lived a childhood dominated by agricultural work in the countryside, which would influence all his work as a writer and photographer. His mother died in 1945.

Trassard had poor beginnings in high school (by correspondence then at Lycée Michelet in Vanves). From the 4th year to the philosophy class, he attended the Lycée of Laval, whose last two years he spent as a boarder. He obtained a degree in law from the Faculté de droit de Paris. Between these legal studies, he followed the courses of ethnology at the Musée de l'Homme and especially, during two years, the courses of prehistory of André Leroi-Gourhan.

== Early career in literature ==
He got married in 1955. His first child, François, was born in 1957. At the end of 1959, he sent his first texts to Jean Paulhan who received him at the La Nouvelle Revue française (NRF) and led him to Georges Lambrichs, the new literary director at Gallimard.

In July 1960, came his first publication, Le lait de taupes ("Mole milk") at the NRF. In 1960, he became a farmer of communal rights alongside his father, then in his place after his death in 1968. He maintained this profession until 31 December 2000. In 1961, Trassard established a friendship with Jean Clay, a journalist and historian of art, who, for a time, was his first reader and an important supporter. Clay later became the publisher of the Macula publishing house.

In 1962, Trassard remarried after his first marriage ended. He had a daughter, Laure, in 1968.

== Later career in literature and photography ==
During his relationship with Lambrichs, he was acquainted with Dominique Aury and Constance Delaunay, and also with all the authors of the new series of Lambrichs, Le Chemin: Jacques Borel, Le Clézio, Michel Butor, Georges Perros, Jean Roudaut, Pierre Bourgeade, Ludovic Janvier, Marianne Alphant, Max Loreau and many others, including Henri Thomas, though he was older.

The magazines successively directed by Lambrichs, Les Cahiers du Chemin then the NRF, in which he actively participated, gave rise to various meetings where the authors met. Some of them became and remained very close friends of Trassard: Michel Chaillou, Michel Deguy, Gérard Macé. From time to time, he published in the magazine Poésie, directed by Deguy. In 1980, he met Georges Monti, a publisher installed at Cognac.

The first exhibition of his photographs took place in 1983, at La Rochelle (Chapelle Fromentin, expo. collective), then at Montpellier in 1987 (Médiathèque) and at Caen in 1991 (Théâtre). In 1992, sixty photographs by Trassard were exhibited for three months at Centre Pompidou under the title La campagne de Jean-Loup Trassard. Bernard Lamarche-Vadel, a writer and art critic, introduced him into the world of photography.

He was a breeder of: Maine-Anjou cows, calves under the mother, oxen fed in traditional ways. From 1953 until his death in 2026, he divided his time, in varying proportions, between the Mayenne countryside and Paris. He extended his action locally by creating the association Mémoire rurale au Pays de l'Ernée in 1999, whose aim is to trace the evolution of lifestyles in the 20th century on the territory in order to leave a trace for future generations.

== Death ==
Trassard died at a hospital in Mayenne on 13 January 2026, at the age of 92.

== Bibliography ==
- 1960: Le lait de taupes, in Nouvelle Revue Française, directed by Jean Paulhan
- 1961: L’Amitié des abeilles: recueil de nouvelles, series directed by Georges Lambrichs, "Jeune Prose", Gallimard
- 1965: L’érosion intérieure (short stories), Paris, Gallimard
- 1969: Paroles de laine (short stories), Gallimard
- 1975: L’ancolie (short stories), Gallimard
- 1980: L’érosion intérieure (narrations), Gallimard
- 1981: Inventaire des outils à main dans une ferme (texts and photos), Cognac, Le Temps qu'il fait
- 1981: Des cours d’eau peu considérables (narrations), Gallimard
- 1981: Histoires françaises (in collaboration with Patrice Roy), L'École des loisirs
- 1981: Trois noëls en forêt (in collaboration with Michel Gay), École des loisirs
- 1982: Une classe de neige, École des loisirs
- 1983: Bleue bergère (in collaboration with Bernard Jeunet), École des loisirs
- 1984: Une classe de nature ou Comment repiquer les petits citadins en pleine terre, École des loisirs
- 1984: Rana-la-Menthe (in collaboration with John Howe), Ipomée
- 1985: Abbaye de Clermont: abbaye cistercienne en Mayenne (in collaboration with Patrice Roy), Éditions Siloë
- 1985: La Mayenne des chemins creux: 70 circuits de petite randonnée pédestre, Association départementale de la randonnée pédestre (hiking) of Mayenne, ADRPM
- 1985: L’amitié des abeilles, Cognac, Le Temps qu'il fait
- 1987: Lance-pierre (short story), Le Temps qu'il fait
- 1987: Tardifs instantanés (souvenirs), Gallimard
- 1989: Territoire (texts and photographs), Le Temps qu'il fait
- 1989: Union soviétique: littérature et perestroïka (in collaboration with Charles Dobzynski and Claude Frioux), Europe
- 1989: Campagnes de Russie (travel), Gallimard
- 1990: Images de la terre russe (texts and photographs), Le Temps qu'il fait
- 1990: Ligature (lithography by Daniel Nadaud on five texts), Plancoët, Hôtel Continental
- 1991: Caloge (narrations), Le Temps qu'il fait
- 1991: Ouailles (texts and photographs), Le Temps qu'il fait
- 1993: L'Espace antérieur (souvenirs), Gallimard, Prix France Culture
- 1993: Archéologie des feux (texts and photographs), Le Temps qu'il fait
- 1994: Traquet motteux ou L’agronome sifflotant, Le Temps qu'il fait
- 1995: Objets de grande utilité (texts and photographs), Le Temps qu'il fait
- 1995: Nous sommes le sang de cette génisse (narration), Gallimard
- 1996: Tumulus, photographs by Jean-Philippe Reverdot, Le Temps qu'il fait
- 2000: Les derniers paysans (photographs), le Temps qu'il fait
- 2000: Dormance (novel), Gallimard
- 2003: La Composition du jardin (texts and photographs), Le Temps qu'il fait
- 2004: La Déménagerie (novel), Gallimard
- 2005: Nuisibles (texts and photographs), Le Temps qu'il fait
- 2006: Le voyageur à l’échelle (texts and photographs), Le Temps qu'il fait
- 2007: Conversation avec le taupier, Le Temps qu’il fait
- 2007: Amère la mer (texts and photographs), Vendôme, c. 1924
- 2007 L’Ancolie, Gallimard, Une réédition dans la collection L’Imaginaire de L’Ancolie, sorti en 1975 dans la collection Le Chemin
- 2008: Sanzaki, Le Temps qu’il fait
- 2010: Eschyle en Mayenne, Le Temps qu’il fait
- 2012: L’homme des haies, Gallimard, (Prix de l'Académie française Maurice Genevoix 2013).
- 2012: Causement, Le Temps qu’il fait
- 2015: Neige sur la forge, Gallimard, (ISBN 9782070149384)
- 2015: Exodiaire, Le temps qu'il fait

== Studies on Trassard ==
- "Jean-Loup Trassard: le cerceau de bois", by Yves Leclair, in L’Ecole des lettres (II) n°5, éd. L’École des Loisirs, 15 November 1984.
- "Territoire de Jean-Loup Trassard", by Yves Leclair, in La Nouvelle Revue Française, n°438-439, éd. Gallimard, July–August 1989.
- "Ouailles de J.-L.Trassard" by Yves Leclair, in La Nouvelle Revue Française, n°471, éd. Gallimard, April 1992
- "Un Mayennais au souffle cosmique: Jean-Loup Trassard", by Pascal Rannou, in "Voix d’Ouest en Europe, souffles d’Europe en Ouest", acts of symposia, Angers, Presses de l’Université, 1993, p. 559-572
- "Trassard", by Yves Leclair, in La Nouvelle Revue Française, n°503, éd. Gallimard, December 1994.
- Mythe et réalité dans "Nous sommes le sang de cette génisse" by Jean-Loup Trassard, mémoire de maîtrise de Julien Guerrier, Angers, 1999
- L’écriture du bocage: sur les chemins de Jean-Loup Trassard, texts collected and interview by Arlette Bouloumié, Angers, Presses de l’Université, 2000
- Salade ou rôti? Jean-Loup Trassard, écrivain photographe: de la composition du paysage à l’illusionnisme, by Pierre Guicheney, revue 303, n° 113 - 4th Quarter 2010
- "Jean-Loup Trassard", Cahier n° 11 (dir. Dominique Vaugeois), Le Temps qu'il fait, 2014.
