= Michel Gay =

French illustrator and author (born 1947)

- Born: 1 September 1947 (age 78); Lyon, France
- Occupations: Illustrator; author
- Writing career
- Genre: Children's literature

Michel Gay (born 1 September 1947, in Lyon) is a French illustrator and author of children's books.

Gay began publishing at L'École des loisirs from 1980. He usually creates albums with young animals characters such as Biboundé the penguin. He also illustrates texts written by others. His character Zou the Little Zebra is at the origin of an animated series for television in 2011: Zou.

== Publications ==
=== Album ===
==== Author-illustrator ====
- 1980: Le Loup-Noël, l'École des loisirs
- 1983: Pousse-poussette, l'École des loisirs
- 1982: Lapin-express, l'École des loisirs
- 1983: Petit-avion, l'École des loisirs
- 1983: Petit-bateau, l'École des loisirs
- 1983: Petit-camion, l'École des loisirs
- 1984: Petit hélicoptère, l'École des loisirs
- 1984: Biboundé, l'École des loisirs
- 1985: La Surprise de Biboundé, l'École des loisirs
- 1986: Papa vroum, l'École des loisirs
- 1987: Biboundissimo, l'École des loisirs
- 1988: Docteur Biboundé, l'École des loisirs
- 1989: Dodo tout le monde !, l'École des loisirs
- 1989: Le Cartable qui fait atchoum, l'École des loisirs
- 1990: Câline-mi et Câline-moi, l'École des loisirs
- 1991: Comment naissent les biboundés, l'École des loisirs
- 1992: Le Blotto de neige, Hachette jeunesse
- 1992: Blotto et les outils, Hachette jeunesse
- 1993: Blotto et l'étoile de mer, Hachette jeunesse
- 1994: Bombyx dessine des lettres, l'École des loisirs
- 1994: Les albums de la famille loup, Gautier-Languereau
- 1996: Juste une seconde, l'École des loisirs
- 1997: Papa trop, l'École des loisirs
- 1998 Zou, l'École des loisirs
- 1999: Cromignon, l'École des loisirs
- 2002: Zou n'a pas peur, l'École des loisirs
- 2006: Cropetite, l'École des loisirs
- 2011: Les Sous de Zou, l'École des loisirs

=== Illustrator ===
- 1980: Boris Moissard, Valentine au grand magasin, l'École des loisirs
- 1981: Gérard Pussey, Les Citrouilles du diable, l'École des loisirs
- 1981: Gérard Pussey, Fiston et Gros Papa, Nathan
- 1981: Jean-Loup Trassard, Trois Noëls en forêt, l'École des loisirs
- 1982: Irène Schwartz, Minie Malakoff, la souris du métro, l'École des loisirs
- 1989: Marie-Aude Murail, Le hollandais sans peine, L'École des loisirs, Prix Sorcières 1990
- 1990: Christophe Donner, Copain trop copain, l'École des loisirs
- 1990: Geneviève Brisac, Olga, l'École des loisirs
- 1993 Elsa Devernois, À trois on a moins froid, l'École des loisirs
- 1996: Geneviève Brisac, Olga va à la pêche, l'École des loisirs
- 2001: Geneviève Brisac, Olga et le chewing-gum magique, l'École des loisirs
