= Rinaldo Rinaldi =

Italian sculptor

Rinaldo Rinaldi (April 13, 1793 – July 28, 1873) was an Italian sculptor.

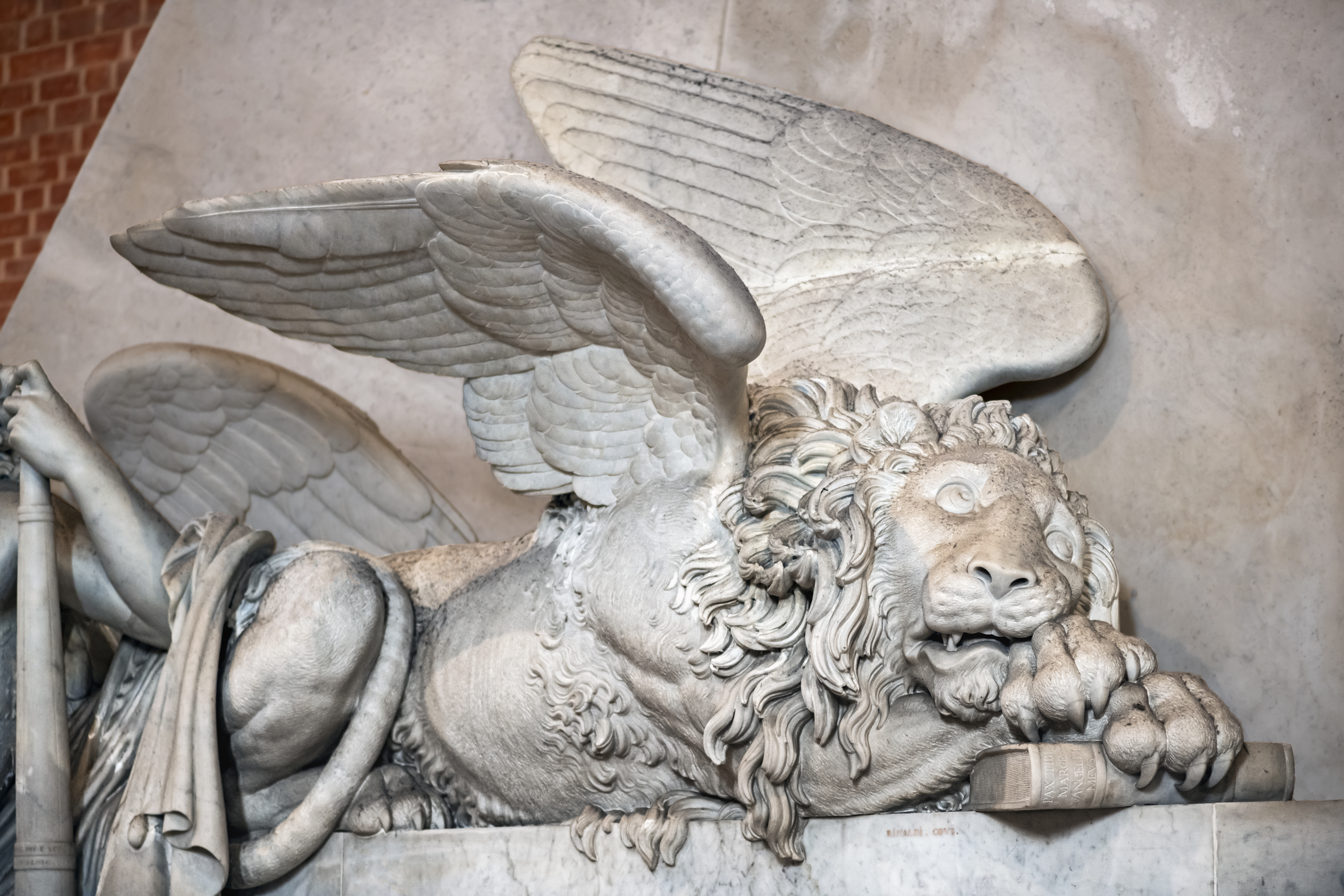
Monument to Canova - The Lion of Venice in a sad pose

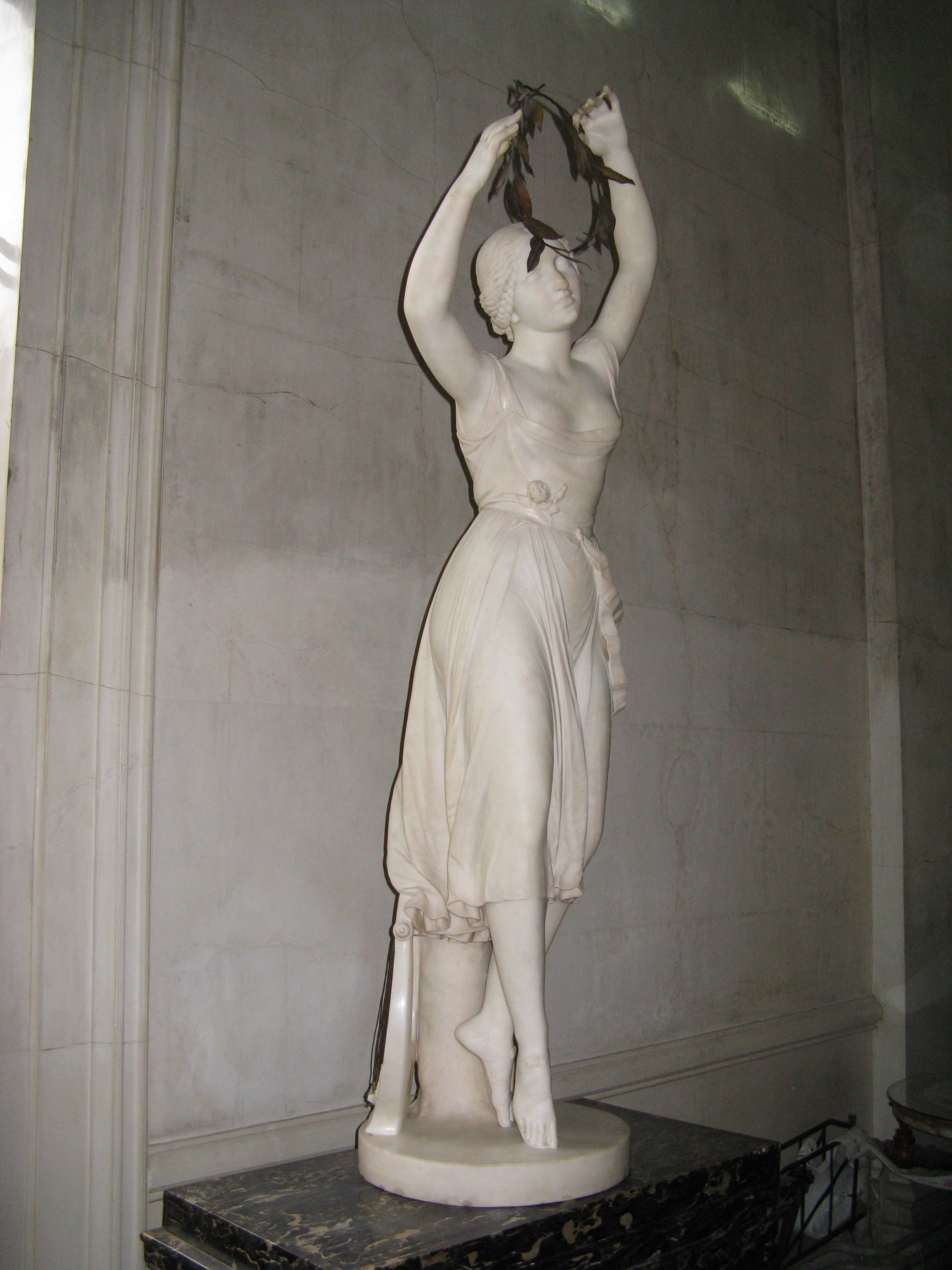
Dancer, Hermitage St Petersburg

== Biography ==
He was born in Padua. His parents were Teresa dei Conti Pisani and Domenico. At the age of eight he learned the trade of wood carving from his father. By the age of 14, he began carving in stone. By age 18, he was sent to study at the Accademia di Belle Arti in Venice under Leopoldo Cicognara and Matteini. A year later, he received a stipend to work in Rome, where he became a pupil of Canova in Rome. After the death of his master, Rinaldi attempted to occupy the same studio Canova had used for 30 years. In 1849, he joined the municipal council of the brief Roman Republic. After the papal restoration, he was briefly jailed. He completed the Monument to Pietro Fortunato Calvi, one of the Belfiore martyrs, unveiled in 1872 in Noale near the tower of the Clock Tower. He became dean of the Accademia di San Luca in Rome. He became Honorary member of the Accademia di Belle Arti of Venice in 1823, of the academy in Rome in 1823, and the Virtuosi del Panteon in 1832, of the Academy of Fine Arts of Philadelphia in 1863. Pius IX decorated him with the Order of St Gregory and King Vittorio Emanuele II knighted him as cavalier of the Order of the Crown of Italy. He died in Rome.

Among his works are:

- Erminia
- Moïse d'après Michel-Ange
- Armida
- La Ninfa Egeria
- Penelope che consegna ai Proci l'arco di Ulisse
- Ulisse recognized by his dog
- Metabo, King of the Volscians, consacra Camilla sulle sponde dell'Amaseno
- Cassandra
- Group of Vergini
- Justice and Peace
- Cerere che insegna a Tirotolemo l'uso dell'aratro
- Resurrection
- Eve and Abel
- Lost Time
- Gained Time
