= Bernard Lamarche-Vadel =

French writer and art critic

Bernard Lamarche-Vadel (16 July 1949, Avallon. – 2 May 2000, La Croixille in Mayenne) was a French writer, poet, art critic and collector.

== Life ==
The son of a veterinarian, self-taught, his tastes for art and literature earned him a paternal anathema. At 19 years he met Gaëtane Vadel whose name he joined to his. A graduate from the École pratique des hautes études in art sociology (1970), he subsequently taught at the Paris-I Panthéon-Sorbonne University and then at ICART in 1979. A poet and short stories writer, Bernard Lamarche-Vadel composed a work of art critic in the 1970s and founded the magazine Artistes. He also organized numerous exhibitions ("Jean Degottex. Rétrospective", 1978, musée d'Art moderne (ARC), Paris / « Finir en beauté », juin 1981)

He committed suicide in 2000 aged 50, in his castle of La Rongère.

His photographic collection was stored at Musée Nicéphore-Niépce in Chalon-sur-Saône.

An exhibition devoted to his work of art critic was presented in 2009 by the Musée d'Art Moderne de la Ville de Paris.

== Works ==
- 1976: Michel-Ange,
- 1976: Du chien les bonbonnes, Bourgois
- 1978: Degottex, l'œuvre de Jean Degottex et la question du tableau. Musée de Grenoble / Musée d'art et d'industrie, Saint-Étienne
- 1978: L'Efficacité des rouges, Bourgois
- 1979: Giacometti
- 1980: Jean-Pierre Pincemin, Bourgois
- 1981: Helmut Newton, Regard
- 1982: Cols de l'accent violent, éditions Unes
- 1983: Pour Bram Van Velde, éditions Unes
- 1983: Lisible pour M., éditions Unes
- 1983: Collection Bernard Lamarche-Vadel, Musée Sainte-Croix, Poitiers
- 1984: Château dernier, éditions Unes
- 1985: Catalogue Maeght n°32 : peintures 1965-1980
- 1985: Joseph Beuys, Marval
- 1985: Alberto Giacometti, N.E.F.
- 1985: Klossowski, l'énoncé dénoncé, Marval
- 1985: Georges Autard, Action régionale pour la création artistique
- 1985: Sidérations : l'atelier photographique français. Coedition Tours, Liège, Rome. Centre de Création Contemporaine : Carte Segrete
- 1985: Tapiès, peinture 1965-1980, Maeght
- 1986: Opalka, 1965, la Différence
- 1986: Qu'est-ce que l'art français ?, La Différence
- 1987: Continent Kirkeby. Centre de création contemporaine de Tours
- 1987: Pierre Klossowski
- 1987: Éric Dalbis, La Différence
- 1987: Hucleux, La Différence
- 1987: Zoo, Jean-Philippe Reverdot, Marval
- 1988: Majy Magie, La Différence
- Points de mire
- 1988: Mimmo Paladino, le guetteur, La Différence
- 1988: Olivier Thomé: propos La Différence
- Unes-Nues, photographs by Jean Rault, texts by Régis Durand and Bernard Lamarche-Vadel
- 1990: Erik Dietman, La Différence
- 1990: Facile, Marval
- 1990: Jean-Michel Sanejouand, les charges-objets, La Différence
- 1990: Villeglé, Marval
- 1992: Les Espionnes, (collaboration, B. Rheims, G. Kehayoff)
- Yvan Salomone - (DEHORS), (collaboration, Yannick Miloux), Rennes, La Criée, 1992, 36 p.
- 1993: Le Bonheur, (collaboration F. Chevallier), La Différence
- 1993: Vitré, La Différence
- 1993: Lewis Baltz, La Différence
- 1993: Arman [Classiques du XXIe]
- 1993: Vétérinaires, (Prix Goncourt du premier roman 1994)
- 1995: Bugatti : les meubles, les sculptures, les autos, (collaboration B. Dufour), La Différence
- 1995: Carmelo Zagari, La Différence
- 1995: Tout casse, Gallimard
- 1995: Lignes de mire : écrits sur la photographie, Marval
- 1996: La logeuse, (collaboration Y. Guillot), Marval
- 1997: Entretiens, témoignages, études critiques (dir. I. Rabineau. Méréal)
- 1997: Sa vie, son œuvre, dedicated to Philippe Sollers
- 1997: Fos, natures d'un lieu, images en manœuvres
- 1998: L'art, le suicide, la princesse et son agonie
- 1999: Comment jouer Enfermement, Christian Bourgois, Paris
- 1999: Arman, La Différence
- 2000: De la douce hystérie des bilans, éditions Unes
- Mise en demeure, (photographs Jean-Philippe Reverdot), his last novel

== Filmography ==
- Bernard Lamarche-Vadel appareared in L'Argent (1983) by Robert Bresson

== Bibliography ==
- 1997: Bernard Lamarche-Vadel, Entretiens, témoignages, critiques (under the direction of Isabelle Rabineau), Éditions Méréal, Paris
- 1999: Le Dos du collectionneur, Une photographie de l'enfermement, Dominique Quessada, éditions méréal, Maison européenne de la Photographie.
- 2005: Conférences de Bernard Lamarche-Vadel. La bande-son de l'art contemporain, edition established by Joël Denot, Ifm-Regard
- 2009: Dans l'œil du critique. Bernard Lamarche-Vadel et les artistes, catalog of the exhibition, Paris Musées
- 2009: Face à Lamarche-Vadel, collective, éditions Inculte
