= Jean Degottex =

French painter (1918–1988)

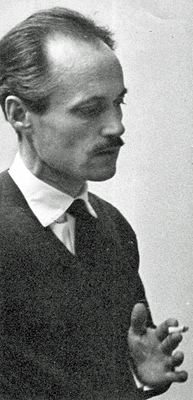
- Jean Degottex in the 1960s
- Born: 25 February 1918; Sathonay-Camp, France
- Died: 9 December 1988 (aged 70); Paris, France
- Resting place: Montparnasse Cemetery
- Known for: Painter
- Style: Abstract painting
- Movement: Minimalism
- Awards: Kandinsky Prize (1951)
- Website: https://jeandegottex.com/en/home/

Jean Degottex (Sathonay-Camp 25 February 1918–Paris 9 December 1988) was a French abstract painter, known in particular for his initial proximity to the lyrical abstraction movement of the 1950s and 1960s. He is considered an important artist of the abstraction movement in the second half of the twentieth century and a significant inspiration for contemporary art. Degottex was particularly inspired by East Asian calligraphy and Zen Philosophy to achieve the erasure of the creative subject.

== Life and art ==
Jean Degottex was born in Sathonay-Camp and spent his childhood in Lyon. Coming from a modest background, he was almost self-taught. At the age of fifteen, he moved to Paris with his parents, quit school and began to earn his living. In Paris, he made contact with the libertarian circles of the 1930s and occasionally practiced drawing in the academies of Montparnasse. He served in the military in Tunisia and Algeria from 1939 to 1941, the years during which he painted his first figurative paintings, under the influence of Fauvism.

He then decided to devote himself entirely to painting. From 1941, he took part in the "Salon for those under thirty" (Salon des moins de trente ans). From 1948, his art became abstract and was closer to lyrical abstraction. In 1949, he had his first exhibition, at the Denise René Gallery, which was associated with avant-garde abstract artists, and at the Beaune Gallery. That year he met Renée Beslon, a poet, visual artist and art critic, who would remain his companion until his death.

In 1951, Degottex was awarded the Prix Kandinsky. From 1954, his style moved towards a gestural abstraction, favoring freedom and speed of execution.

In 1953, he exhibited at the L'Étoile scellée gallery, whose artistic director was André Breton. Breton saw in Degottex's latest works (Feu noir 12–1955, Ascendant 12–1955) a possible pictorial illustration of the principle of "automatic writing", which characterized the works of the surrealist artists. Degottex pointed out to him his spontaneous affinity with Chinese and Japanese writings, and especially with the philosophy and practices of Zen.

The period from 1956 to 1963 was particularly fruitful in Degottex's career. It is also the best known to the public. During those years, he painted large-scale works, often in series with the same idea used repeatedly: suite Ashkenazi (1957), suite Serto (March–April, November 1957), suite des Hagakure (November 1957), les 18 Vides (1959), suite des Roses (1960), suite des Alliances (1960), les 7 Metasignes (1961), and Jshet (1962).

During this time, he experienced tragedy when his daughter, Frédérique, died in an accident at the age of 16. After a year of mourning, Degottex resumed his series: Écritures, with the following works: the suites Rose-Noire (August 1964), Suite Obscure (November–December 1964), Metasphère (1966), ETC (December 1964 / March 1967) and Horsphères (1967). From 1966 until his death, he produced a wider collection of work in Gordes, in the Vaucluse region, where from the early 1970s, he lived in summers with Beslon.

From 1972 to 1976, he held several solo exhibitions at the Galerie Germain. In particular, he exhibited the Médias series. The works in the series usually contain two areas of separated color: a plain surface in matte black acrylic and a lower part in Chinese ink wash.

He worked more and more with paper material: the tearing technique, for example, revealing this texture (seriés d’ARR rouges, puis blancs). The Germain Gallery also exhibited his Papiers Pleins (1974–1975), papers glued and peeled in horizontal stripes, and his Papiers pleins Obliques (1976) with incisions raised by diagonals. With the work Papiers-Report (1977), he began to explore a new technique that involved "reporter" by folding half of the paper surface onto the other. He used this imprint technique on all sorts of materials, including large acrylic canvases, like in the séries des Lignes-Report (1978) and the Plis-Report (1978). In 1979, he created specifically for a solo exhibition at the Abbaye de Sénaque at Gordes, a series of paintings referred to as Déplis.

In 1981, he was awarded the Grand National Prize of Painting (Grand Prix National de la Peinture). In 1982, he joined the Gallery of France and created the series of the Grilles-Collors, the Oblicollors, and the Diacollors. His last major works were the Lignes-Bois (1985) and the Contre-Lignes Bois (1986), in white, grey, or blue-grey.

Jean Degottex died in Paris on 9 December 1988.

== Exhibitions ==
=== Solo exhibitions ===
- Galerie de Beaune, Paris, 1950
- Galerie à l’Étoile Scellée, textes by André Breton and Charles Estienne, Paris, 1955
- Galerie Kléber, textes by Renée Beslon, Paris, 1956 and 1958
- Les Dix-huit vides, Galerie internationale d'art contemporain, Paris, 1959
- Les Alliances, Hélios Art, Bruxelles; galerie San Stephan, Vienne, 1960
- Sept Métasignes sur la Fleur, Palais des beaux-arts, Bruxelles, 1961
- Horsphères, Galerie Jean Fournier, Texte by Alain Jouffroy, Paris, 1967
- Les déchirures, Galerie Germain, Paris, 1972
- Suite, Mèdias, Galerie Germain, Paris, 1976 and 1978
- Musée de Grenoble, 1978
- Degottex. Toiles, papiers, graphiques, 1962–1978, musée d'Art moderne de la ville de Paris, texte by Bernard Lamarche-Vadel, 1978
- Abbaye de Sénanque, Gordes, Vaucluse, 1979
- Degottex. Notes de parcours, Galerie de France, Paris, 1983 and 1985
- Repères 1955–1985, Galerie de France, Paris 1988
- Musée d’Évreux et Musée de Brou, Bourg-en Bresse, 1988

==== Exhibitions after death ====
- Degottex. Reports 77–81, texte by Pierre Buraglio, Galerie de France, Paris, 1990
- Signes et Métasignes, texte by Renée Beslon, Carré d'Art, Nîmes, 1992
- Papiers-Reports, Galerie Sablon, Paris, 1993
- Médias, texte de Geneviève Breerette, Galerie Rabouan-Moussion, Paris, 1996
- Degottex, Espace Fortant Sète, 1997
- Reports, texte by Maurice Benhamou, Galerie Regard, Paris 1997
- La révolution continue, Frac Bourgogne, Dijon, 2000
- Œuvres 78–83, textes by Hubert Besacier and Maurice Benhamou, Maison de la culture de Bourges, 2003
- Degottex 73–86, textes by Hubert Basacier et Maurice Benhamou, Carré Saint Vincent, Orléans, 2005
- Degottex, 58–85, texte by Pierre Wat, Art Paris, Galerie l'Or du Temps, 2007
- Jean Degottex, textes by M. Benhamou, B. Heidsieck, R. Mabin, Pierre Wat, directed by A. Cariou, musée des beaux-arts de Quimper, 2008
- Musée du monastère royal de Brou, Bourg-en-Bresse, 2009
- Musée des beaux-arts, Évreux, 2009
- Galerie Pascal Lainé, présentation Dominique Bollinger, Ménerbes, Vaucluse, 2011
- Galerie Bernard Bouche, Paris, 2013
- Vide-matière, Galerie Jacques Lévy, Paris, 2013
- Jean Degottex, du signe à l'écriture, de l'écriture à la ligne, texte by Pierre Wat, galerie Berthet-Aittouares, Paris, 2013
- Frac Bourgogne, Dijon, 2014
- Galerie Berthet-Aittouares, Paris, 2015

=== Group exhibitions ===
- Sept peintres, Galerie Denise René, Paris, 1949
- Peintres de la Nouvelle École de Paris, Galerie de Babylone, Paris, 1952
- La Coupe et l'Épée, galerie L'étoile Scellée, Paris, 1953
- Alice in Wonderland, Galerie Kléber, Paris, 1956
- Tensions – Jean Degottex, Simon Hantaï, Judit Reigl, Claude Viseux, Galerie René Drouin, 1956
- Documenta II, Cassel, Allemagne, 1959
- XXXIIe Venise Biennale, Italy, 1964
- L’écriture du peintre : Degottex, Georges, Giacometti, Hantaï, Hartung, Mathieu, Michaux, Sonderborg, Tobey, textes by Geneviève Bonnefoi, Galerie Jean Fournier, 1964
- Douze ans D'art contemporain en France, Grand Palais, Paris, 1972
- Abstraction Analytique, musée d'Art moderne de la ville de Paris, 1978
- Lenguajes del papel. Geneviève Asse, Jean Degottex, Henri Michaux, Buenos Aires, Museo Nacional de Bellas Artes, 1987

==== Exhibitions after death ====
- La peinture après l'Abstraction.1955–1975. Martin Barré, Jean Degottex, Raymond Hains, Simon Hantaï, Jacques Villeglé, textes by Suzanne Pagé, musée d'Art moderne de la ville de Paris, 1998
- Rendez-vous, Guggenheim museum and Centre Georges-Pompidou, New York and Paris, 1998
- Kunst-svelten im Dialog, Ludwig museom, Köln, 2000
- Encre / Chine – T'ang Haywen, Gao Xingjian, Jean Degottex, Hong Kong University Museum and Art Gallery, mai-juin 2005
- Les Sujets de l'Abstraction, Fondation Gandur, musée Rath, Genève, 2011 et musée Fabre, Montpellier, 2012
- Phares, Centre Pompidou-Metz, 2014–2016

=== Awards ===
- 1951: Prix Kandinsky
- 1981: National Grand Prize for Painting

=== Public collections ===
- France
  - Bourg-en-Bresse, musée de Brou
  - Brest, musée des beaux-arts
  - Rennes, Frac Bretagne
  - Dijon, Musée des beaux-arts
  - Évreux, Musée d'Évreux
  - Colmar, Musée Unterlinden
  - Grenoble, Musée de Grenoble
  - Marseille, Musée Cantini
  - Nantes, Musée des beaux-arts
  - Paris
    - Bibliothèque nationale de France
    - Centre national d'art et de culture Georges-Pompidou
    - Fonds national d'art contemporain
    - Musée d'art moderne de la ville de Paris
  - Saint-Paul-de-Vence, Fondation Maeght
  - Toulon, Musée d'art de Toulon
- Austria
  - Vienna, Museum of Modern Art
- Belgium
  - Bruxelles, Royal Museums of Fine Arts of Belgium
  - Liège, musée des beaux-arts
- United States
  - Minneapolis Institute of Arts
  - New York City, Solomon R. Guggenheim Museum
- Israel
  - Jerusalem, Israel Museum
- Japan
  - Osaka, Gutai Gallery
  - Kurashiki, Ōhara Museum of Art
- Netherlands
  - Amsterdam, Peter Stuyvesant collection
- Sweden
  - Malmö, Konsthall

== Representative Artworks ==
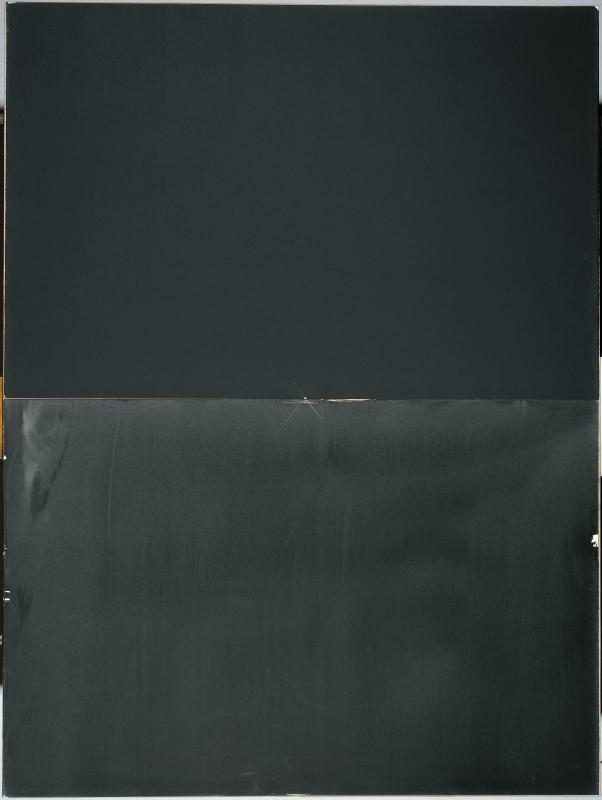
Jean Degottex – Média 2 × 1 (1973)

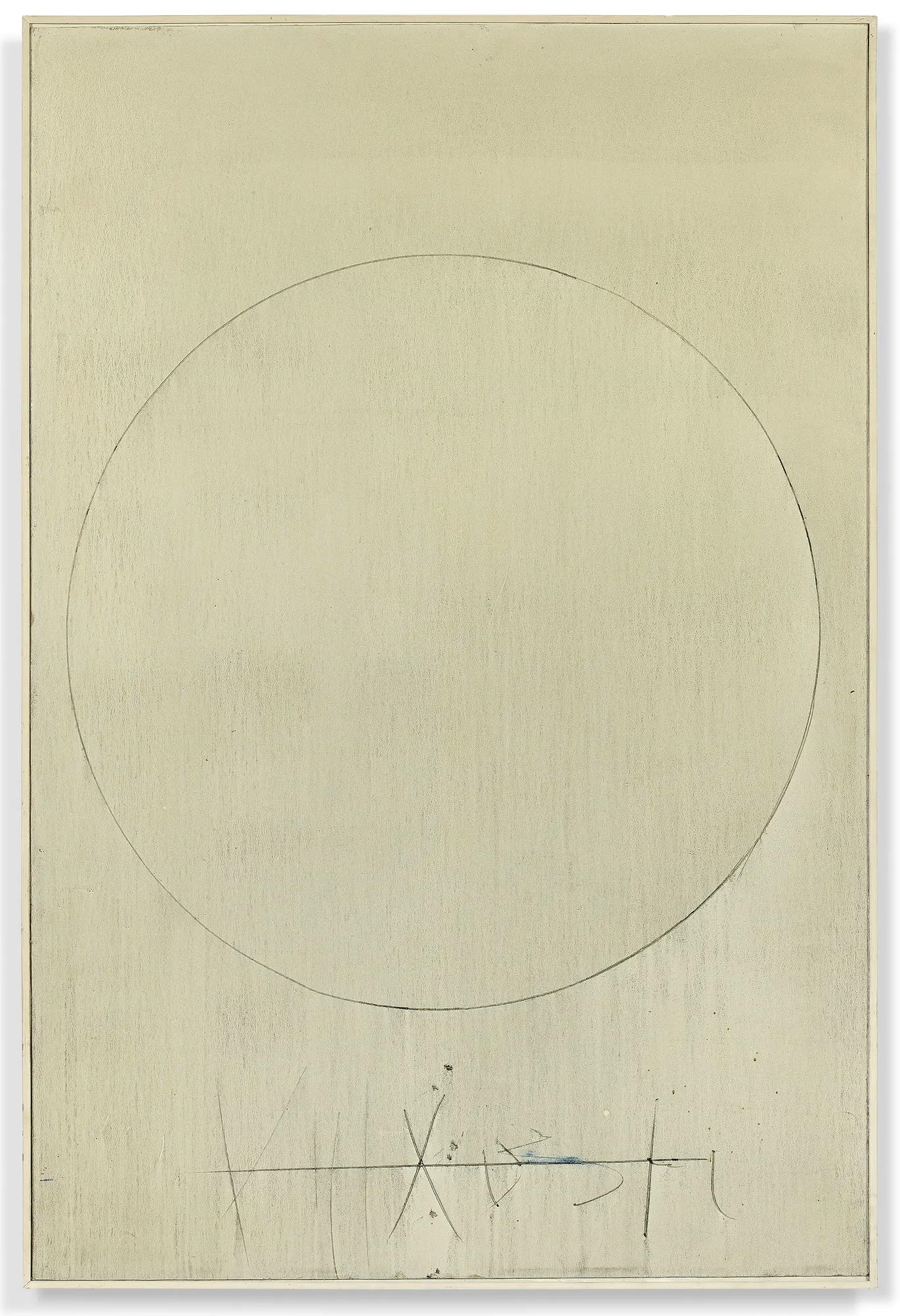
Jean Degottex – Hosphère M2 (1967)

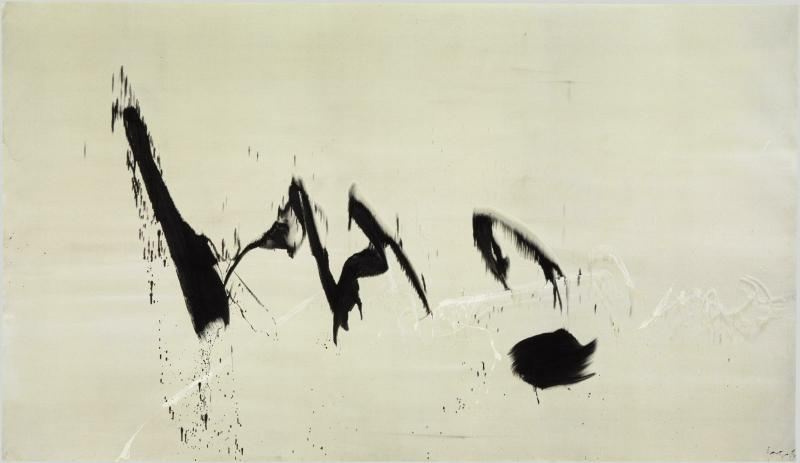
Jean Degottex – Aware II (1961)
