= Jean-Michel Sanejouand =

French artist (1934–2021)

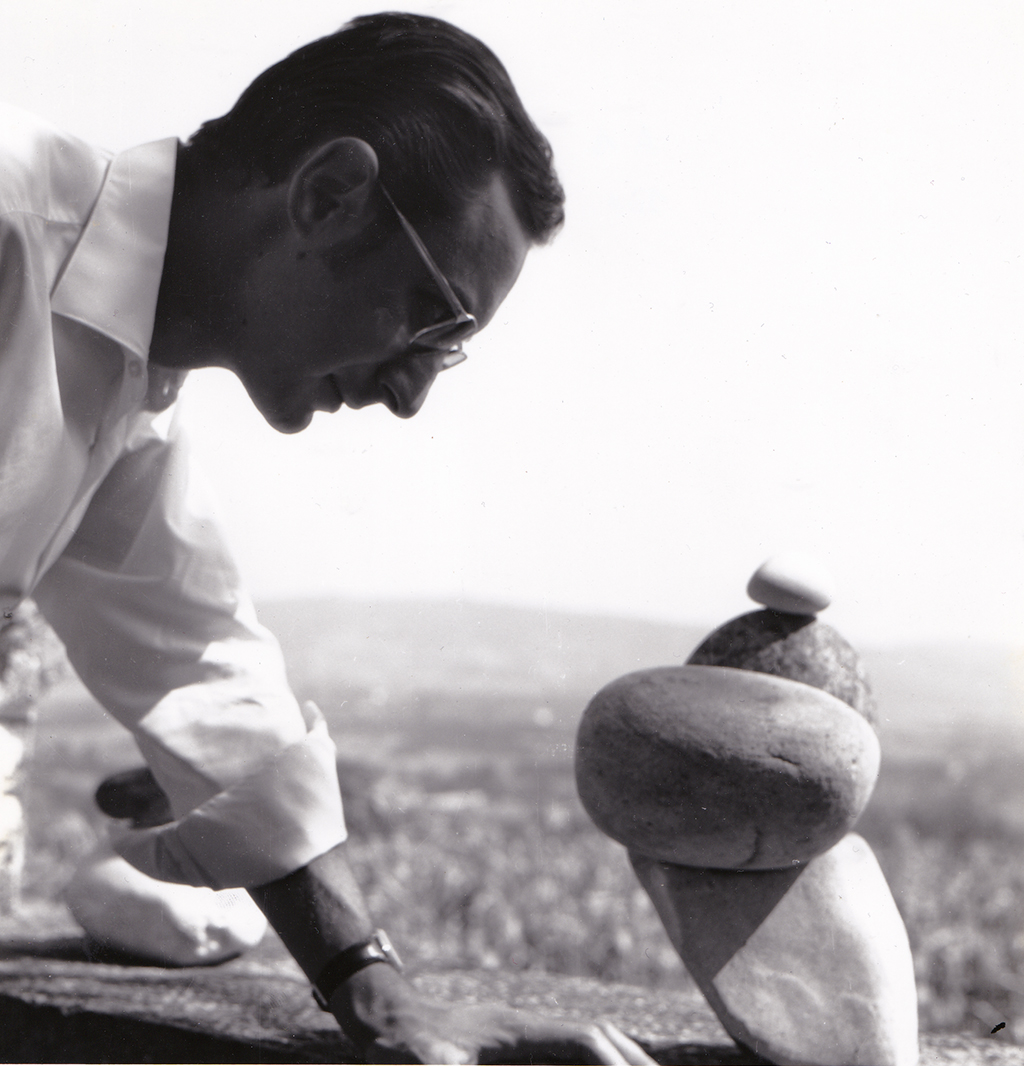
- Jean-Michel Sanejouand in 1960
- Born: 18 July 1934; Lyon, France
- Died: 18 March 2021 (aged 86); Maine-et-Loire, France
- Known for: Sculpture, painting

Jean-Michel Sanejouand (18 July 1934 – 18 March 2021) was a French artist. His work ranged from site-specific art to monumental sculptures, from readymade-like objects, to paintings of oneiric landscapes in which (usually) one of his sculptures stands. During his lifetime, three retrospectives of his work were organized, in Lyon (1986), his birthtown, in Paris (1995), where he lived for thirty years, and in Nantes (2012), in the region where he lived for the rest of his life.

== Biography ==
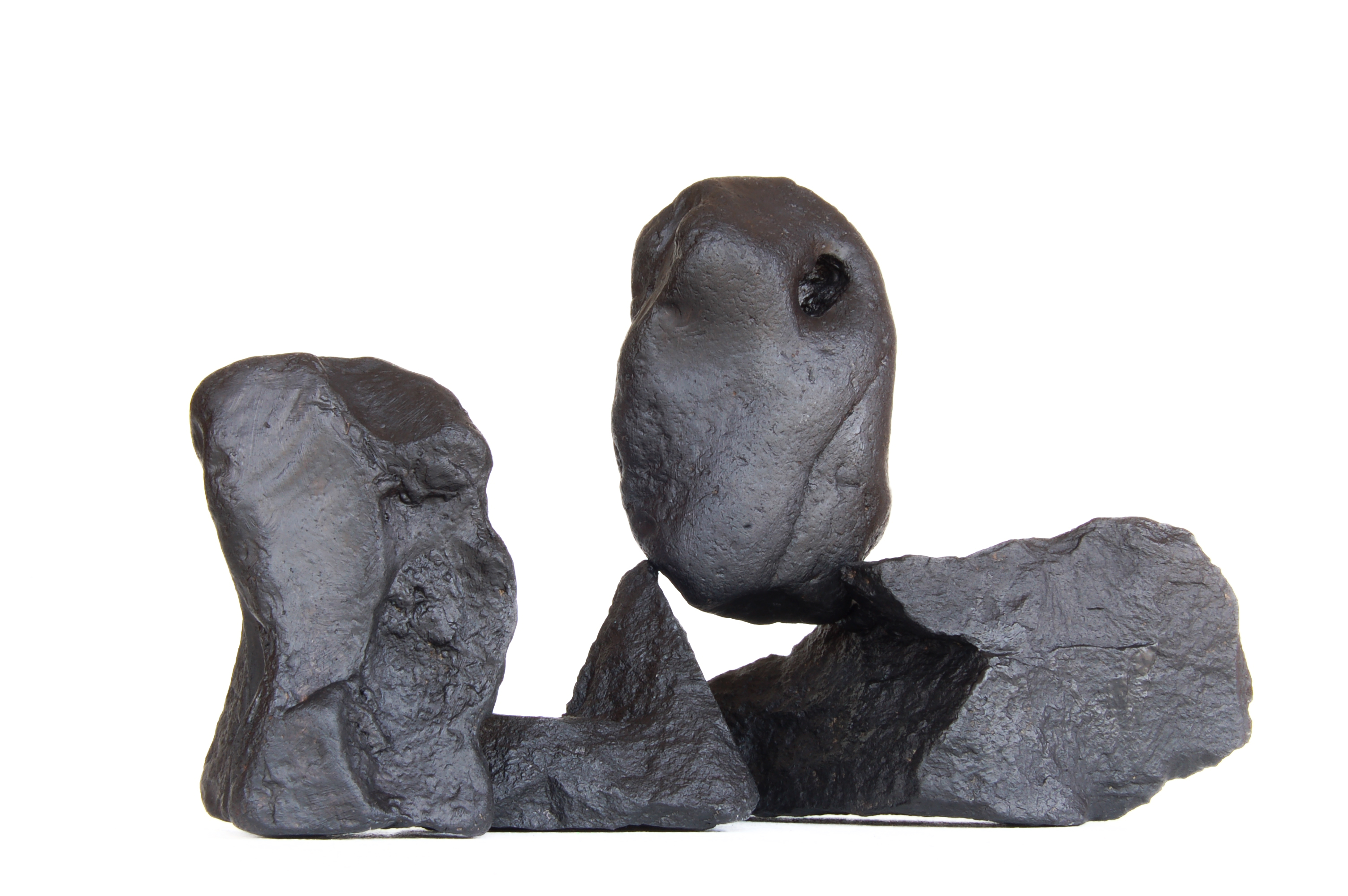
Sanejouand: "Enigme", 2010, acrylic on stones, from the Sculptures series

Born in Lyon, France, in 1934, he received a degree in law from the Institut d'études politiques de Lyon in 1955.

His work can be encapsulated in a series of distinct periods, which the artist titled.

From 1962 to 1967, he worked on a series of readymade-like assemblies of manufactured objects that he called "Charge-Objets" (English: "Charge-Objects").

From 1967 to 1974, he realized or proposed site specific modifications (tree plantings, video projection, windows painted in black, throwing ice blocks on a volcano, etc) that he called "Organisations d'espace" (English: "Space Organizations"), each project, realized or not, being presented with an architectural drawing.

In 1968, he started to paint on canvas. First, with indian ink, in black and white, scenes involving carricatural characters -a series called "Calligraphies d'humeur" (1968-1978).

In 1978, he started to perform "Organisations d'espace" for imaginary landscapes, which he painted with a colorfull, naive style -a series called "Espaces-Peintures" (1978-1986).

These paintings became more and more abstract, until he switched to black and white -a series called "Peintures Noir et Blanc" (1986-1992).

In 1989, he started to make projects of monumental structures, each project being done by assembling together a few stones painted in black. Only two of them were realized: "Le Silence" (1996) and "Le Magicien" (2005).

In 1996, he started to paint his sculptures -a series called "Sculptures-Peintures" (1996-2001).

In 2002, he started to perform "Organisations d'espace" for imaginary landscapes including one of his sculptures, which he painted with a colorfull, highly dynamic style -a series called "Espaces-Critiques" (2002-2008).

He died on 18 March 2021 at his home in Maine-et-Loire, France.

== Gallery ==
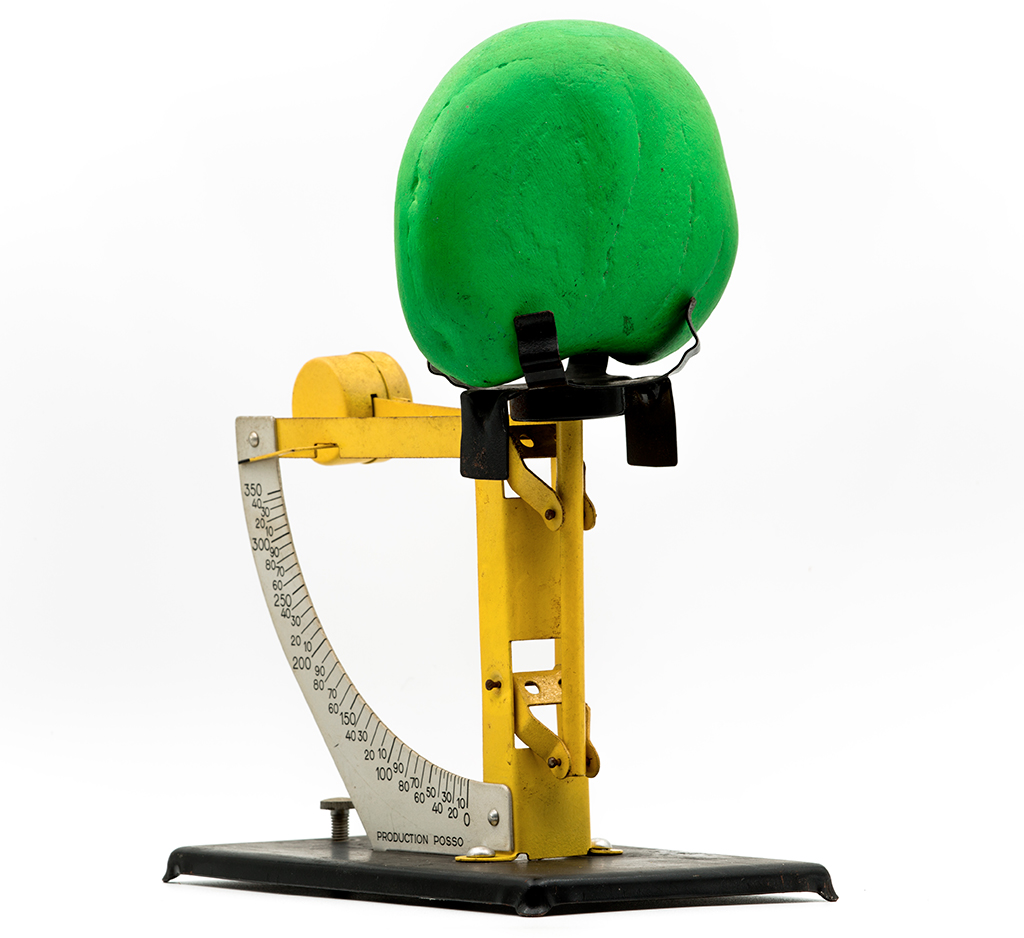
Pèse-pierre, 1963

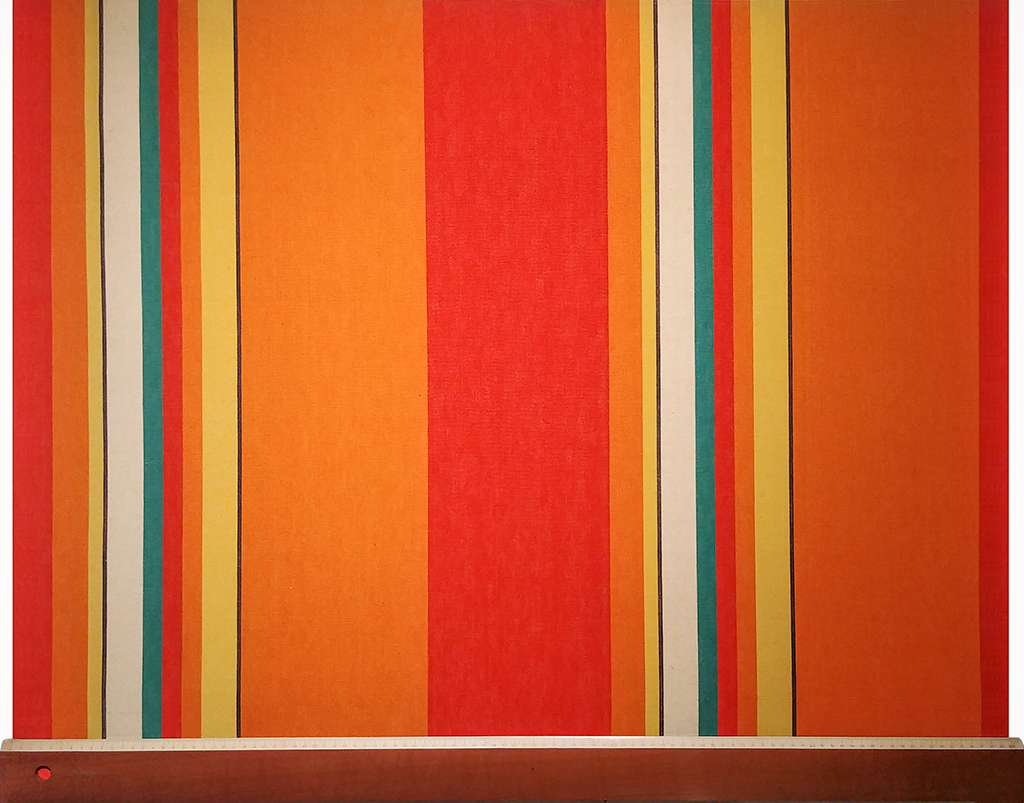
Toile de bâche à rayures et règle, 1964

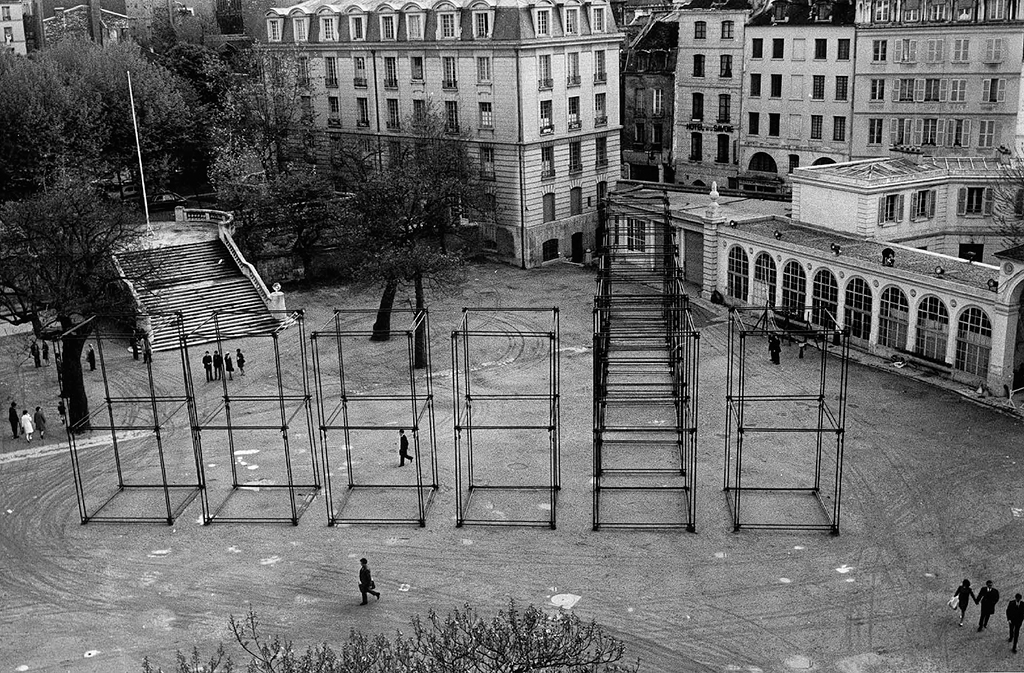
Organisation de l'espace de la cour de l'École Polytechnique à Paris - 06/05/1967

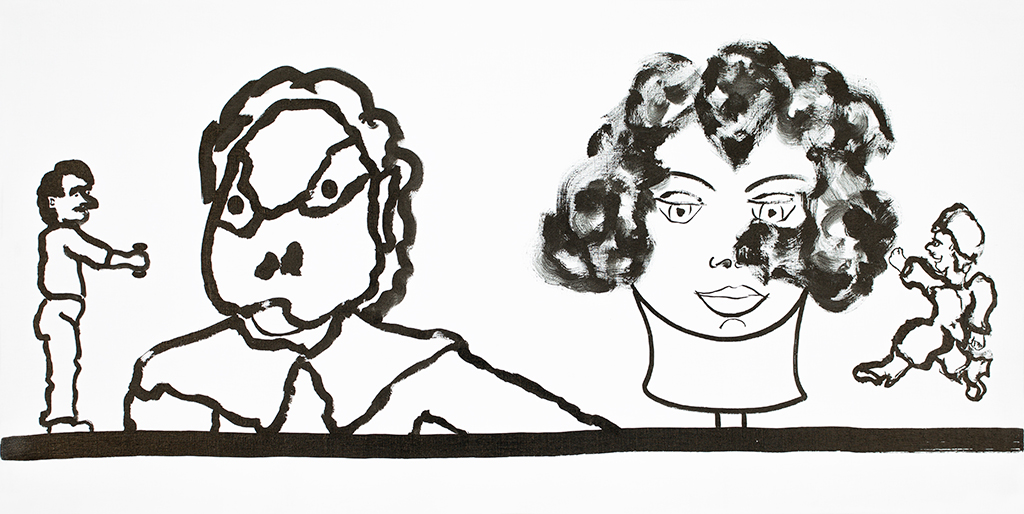
07/06/1973 17h10, indian ink on canvas

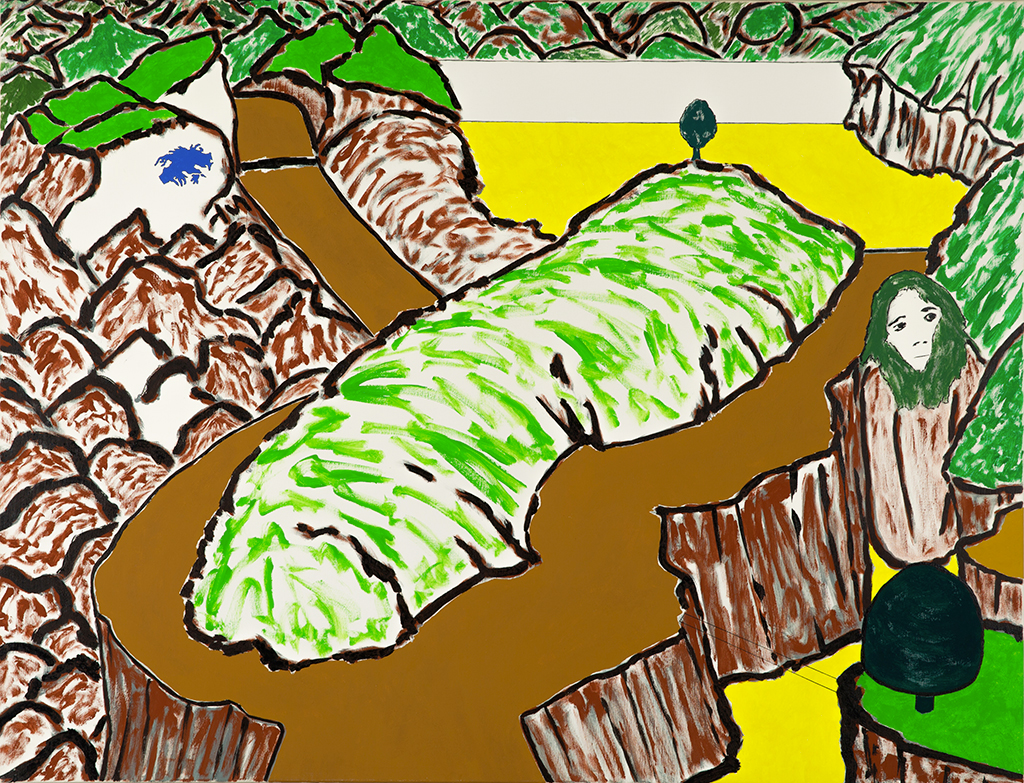
22/12/1978, acrylic on canvas

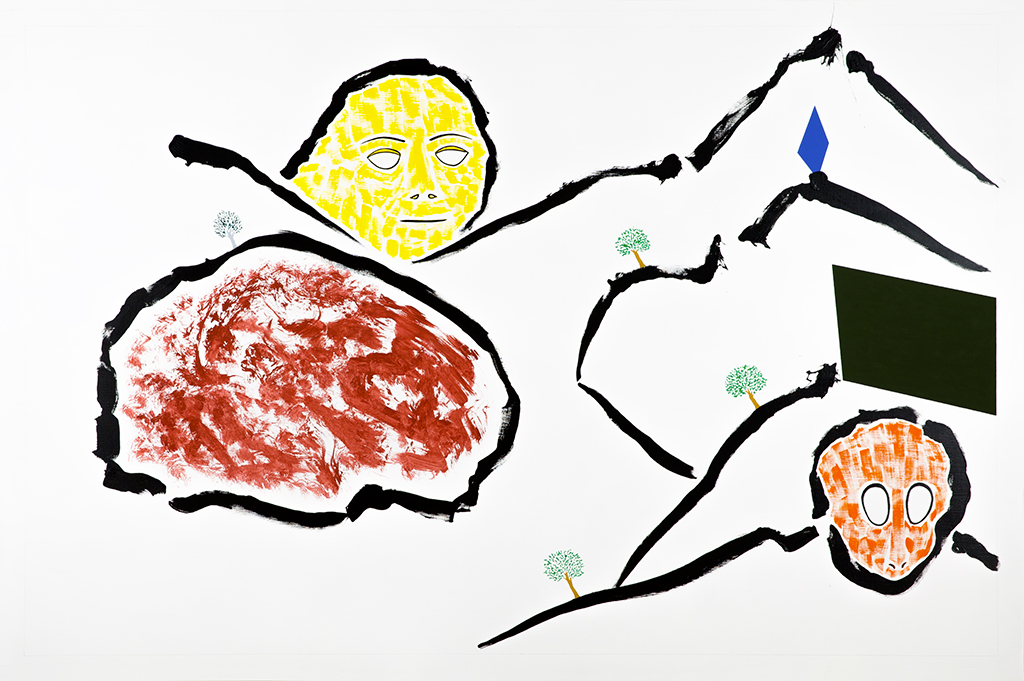
10/07/1982, acrylic on canvas

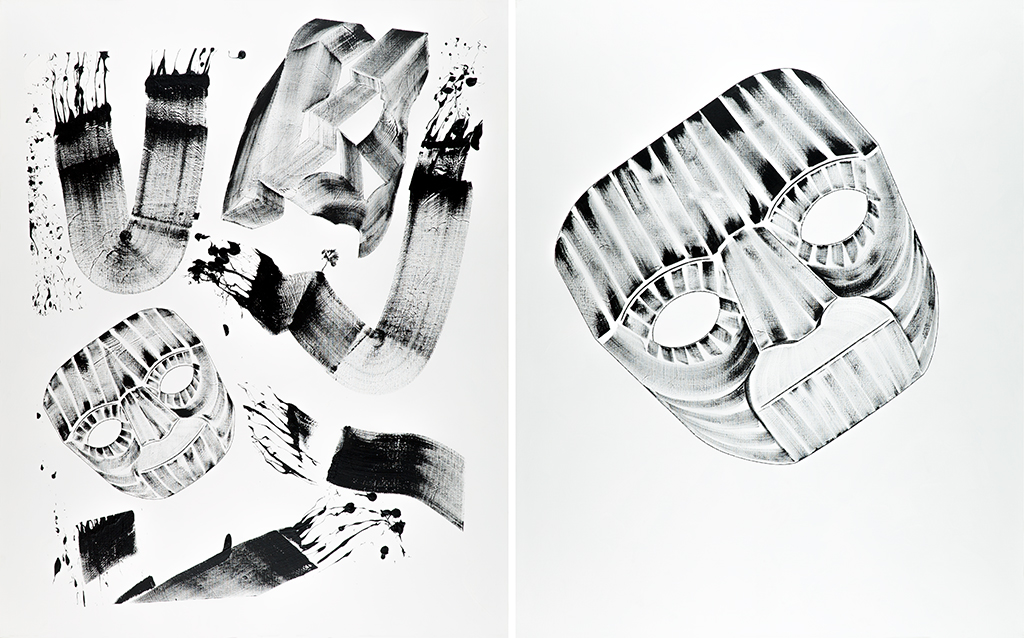
Accord de deux - Ci-devant-après, 1989, acrylic on canvas

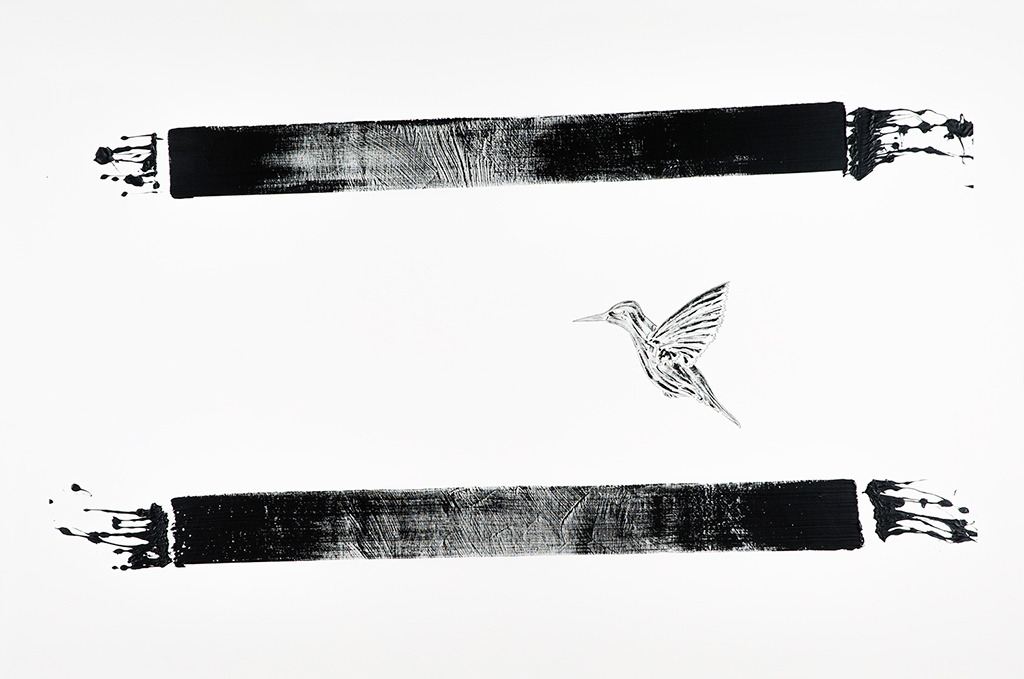
Brouille-code, 1992, acrylic on canvas

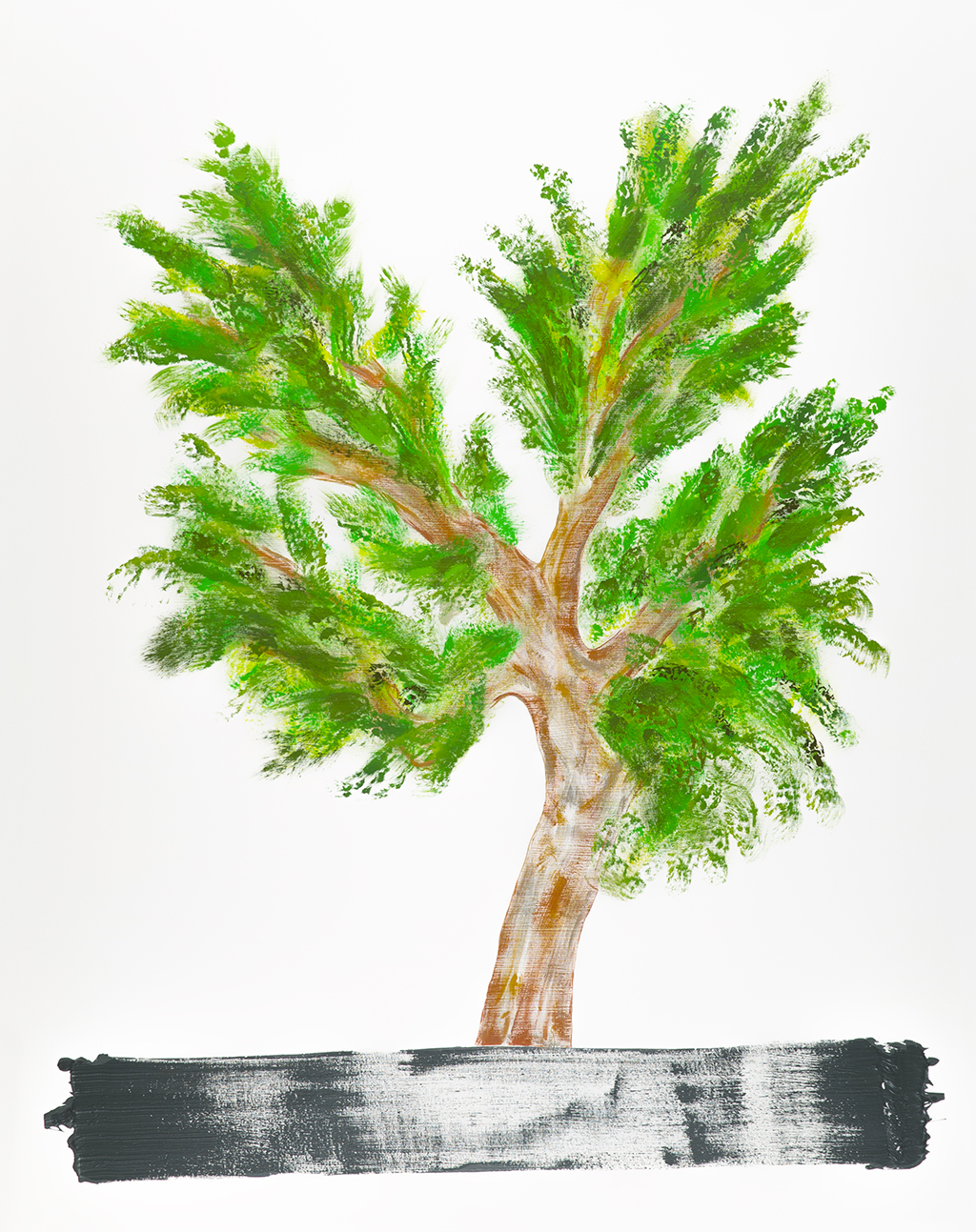
Mi-août, 1996, acrylic on canvas

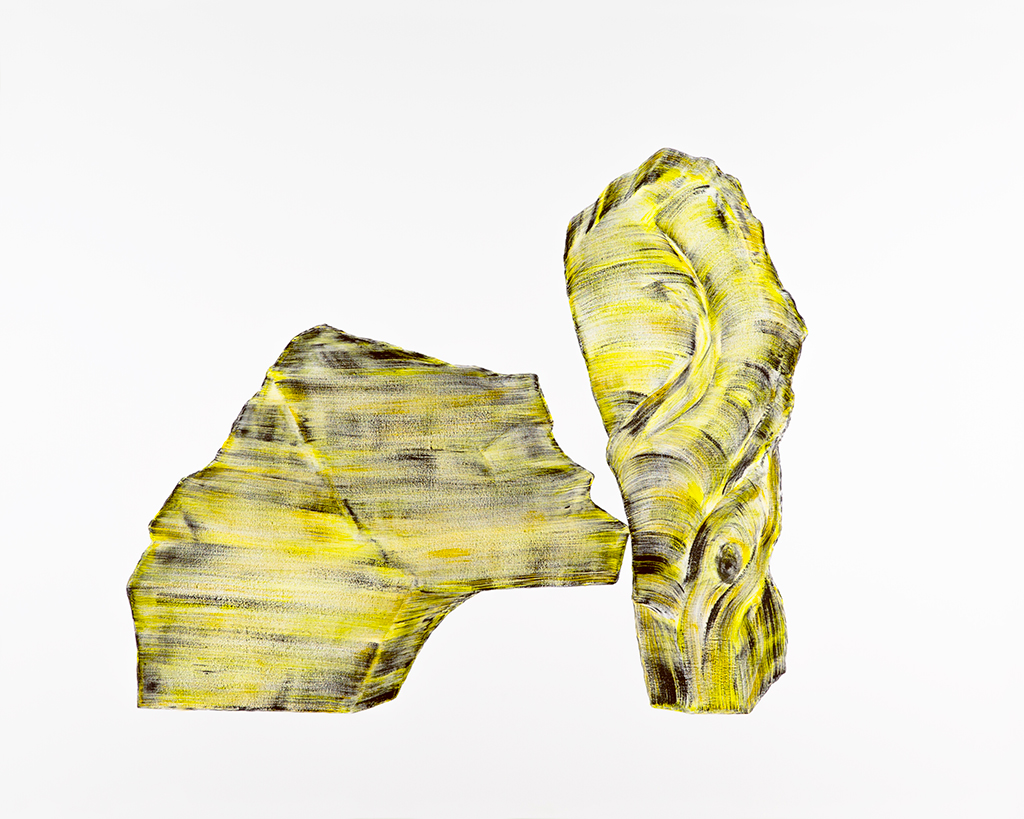
Le Baiser, 2000, acrylic on canvas

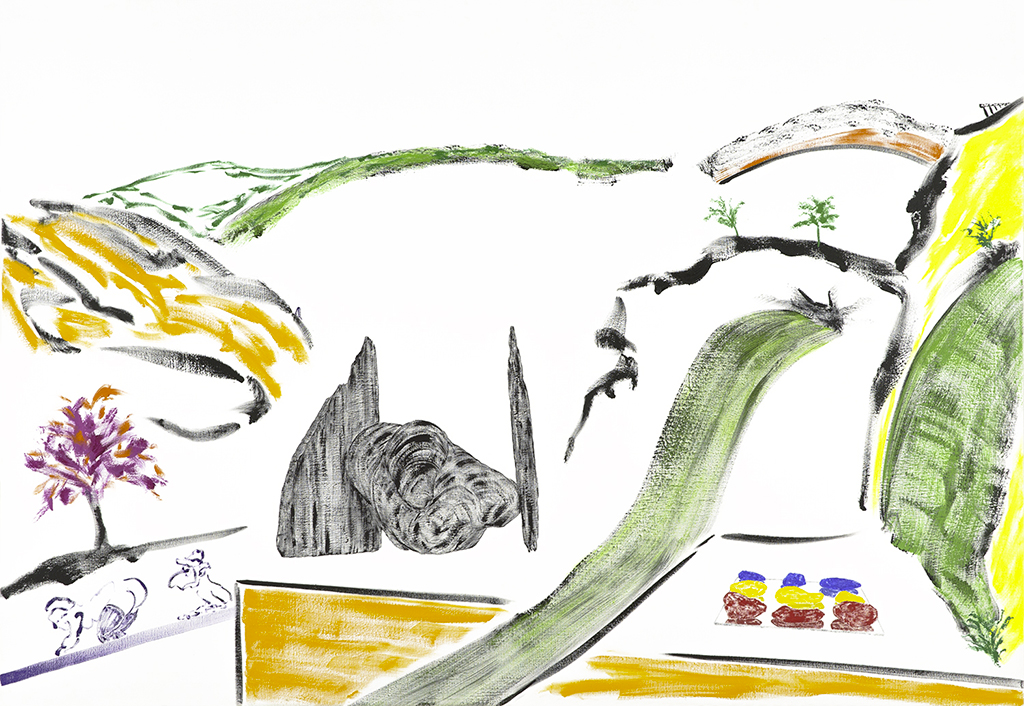
L'intrus, 2003, acrylic on canvas

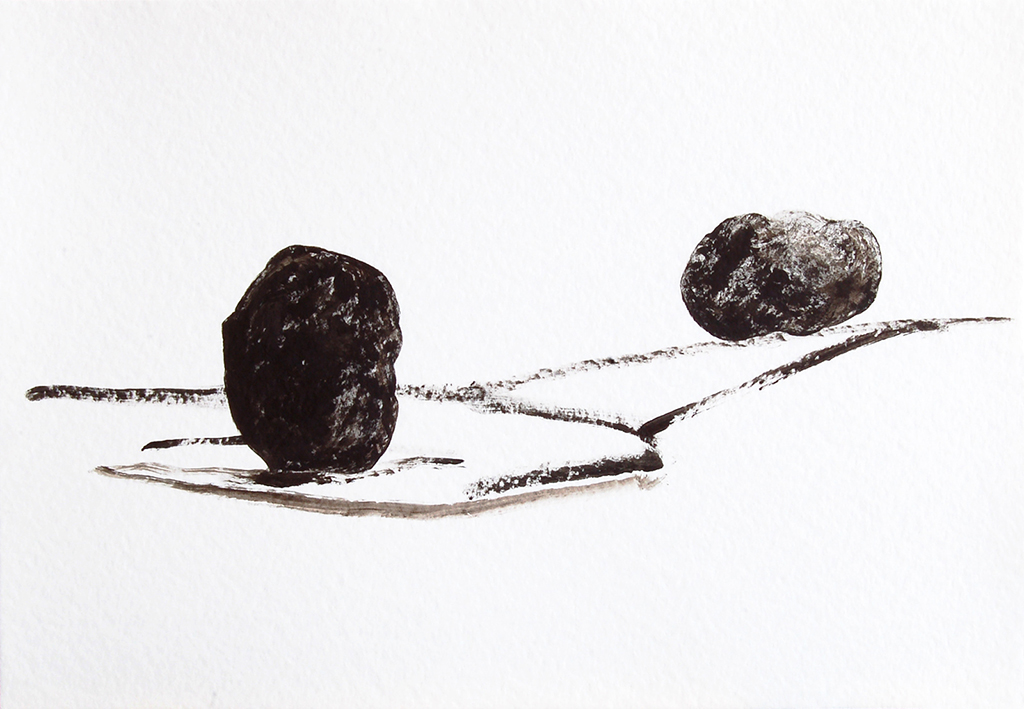
Untitled, 2009, acrylic on paper

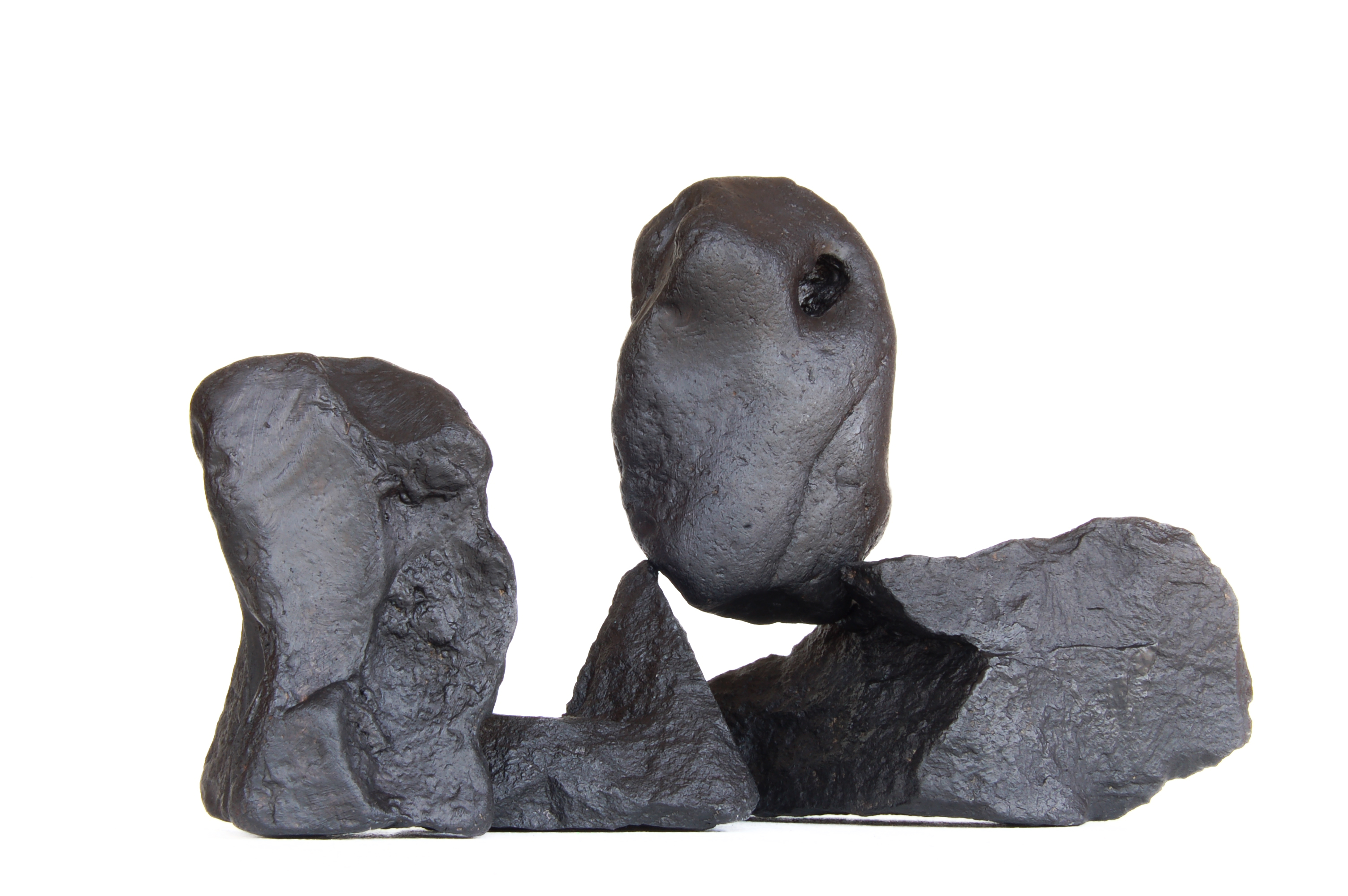
Enigme, 2010, acrylic on stones

== Solo exhibitions ==
- 1967 "Première organisation d'espace", Ecole Polytechnique (Paris).
- 1968 "Deux organisations d'espace", Galerie Yvon Lambert (Paris).
- 1973 "Les Organisations d'espace de Sanejouand", Centre National d'Art Contemporain (Paris).
- 1979 "Espaces-Peintures", The Antwerp Gallery, FIAC (Paris).
- 1982 "Espaces-Peintures", Lens Fine Art Gallery (Antwerp, Belgium).
- 1986 "Rétrospective: des Charges-Objets aux Espaces-Peintures", Palais des Beaux-Arts (Lyon, France).
- 1991 "Espaces-Peintures 1978-1986", MAC (Villeneuve d'Ascq, France).
- 1991 "Les Charges-Objets 1963-1967", Galerie Froment-Putman (Paris).
- 1995 "Rétrospective 1963-1995", MNAM Centre Georges Pompidou (Paris).
- 1996 "Peintures", Galerie Barbier, FIAC (Paris).
- 2002 "Libre et Change", Galerie Chez Valentin (Paris).
- 2005 "Sanejouand", Le Plateau (Paris).
- 2011 "Espaces et Cie", Galerie MAM, Drawing now, Carrousel du Louvre (Paris).
- 2012 "Retrospectivement", Frac des Pays de la Loire (Carquefou), HAB gallery (Nantes), as part of "Jean Michel Sanejouand's year in Pays de la Loire".
- 2015 "Un peu d'espace(s)", Galerie Art : Concept (Paris).
- 2018 "Beyond color", Galerie Art : Concept (Paris).
- 2018 "Operation contact", Galerie Kreo (Paris and London).

== Main group exhibitions ==
- 1967 "Superlund", Lunds Konstall (Sweden). Curator: Pierre Restany. Also featuring: Arman, Christo, Erik Dietman, Yona Friedman, François Morellet, Jean-Pierre Raynaud, Nicolas Schöffer, Constantin Xenakis...
- 1976 Venice Biennale, French pavilion (Italy). Curator: Pierre Restany. Also featuring: Fred Forest, Raymond Hains, Alain Jacquet, Bertrand Lavier, Jean-Pierre Raynaud...
- 1986 "Qu'est-ce que l'art français ?" (What is French art ?), Toulouse (France). Curator: Bernard Lamarche-Vadel. Also featuring: Erik Dietman, Robert Filliou, Gérard Garouste, Gérard Gasiorowski, Jacques Villeglé...
- 1992 Universal Exposition of Seville, French pavilion (Seville, Spain).
- 1999 "Les Champs de la Sculpture" (Sculptures of Champs-Élysées), where "Le Silence" was first exhibited. Also featuring: Tony Cragg, Erik Dietman, Barry Flanagan, Raymond Hains, Keith Haring, Jean-Pierre Raynaud, Bernar Venet, Lawrence Weiner...
- 2006 "La force de l'Art", Grand Palais (Paris). Curator: Anne Tronche.
- 2012 "Ends of the earth: Land Art to 1974", MOCA (Los Angeles, USA).
- 2015 "Cycle des histoires sans fin", MAMCO (Geneva, Switzerland).
- 2020 "Platform: Paris/Brussels", David Zwirner's online viewing room.

== Monumental sculptures ==
- 1996 "Le Silence" (The Silence), a bronze sculpture whose largest version is two meters high. Until 2019, It was installed in a private park of sculptures near Biarritz (France).
- 2005 Le Magicien (The Magician), a five-meters high bronze, installed in the gardens of Palais Saint-Georges, close to the railway station of Rennes (France).

== Collections ==
- Centre Pompidou, Paris
- Fonds régional d'art contemporain, Ile de France
- Musée d'art contemporain de Lyon
- Philadelphia Museum of Art

== Bibliography ==
- Les organisations d'espaces de Jean-Michel Sanejouand (1967-1974), Frédéric Herbin and Jean-Michel Sanejouand
