= Jean-Philippe Reverdot =

French photographer (1952–2020)

Jean-Philippe Reverdot (3 October 1952 – 4 June 2020) was a French photographer.

Reverdot began taking photographs in 1972. Having initially served as a photographer's assistant, he began working independently in 1975. After a decade working on commissioned projects on four continents, in 1985 he shifted to focus on his personal projects, using only black-and-white photography.

== Solo exhibitions ==
- 1984 – Galerie Private Office, Bruxelles & Galerie Saint-Nicolas, Auxerre
- 1986 – Galerie Claudine Bréguet (Mois de la Photo), Paris
- 1989 – Maison des Arts, Évreux
- 1990 – Centre Culturel, Vitré
- 1991 – Musée Sainte-Croix, Poitiers & Artothèque, Grenoble & Institut Culturel Français, Athens
- 1992 – Centre Culturel Français, Amman
- 1994 – Centre Photographique Nord-Pas-de-Calais, Douchy-les-Mines
- 1996 – Corderie royale – Centre international de la mer, Corderie Royale, Rochefort & Galerie Jacques Barbier, Paris
- 2002 – Maison européenne de la photographie

== Bibliography ==
- 1986 – Zoo, text by Bernard Lamarche-Vadel (Marval)
- 1988 – Kurna, text by René Pons (Marval)
- 1990 – Territoire supposé, text by René Pons (Marval)
- 1990 – Fernando Pessõa, text by Philippe Bidaine (Marval)
- 1996 – L’Epreuve (Marval)
- 1996 – Tumulus, texts by Jean-Loup Trassard (Le Temps qu'il fait)
- 1998 – … sur la peau (Marval)
- 2000 – Mise en demeure, text by Bernard Lamarche-Vadel (Filigranes)
- 2002 – Bilan provisoire, text by Hubertus Von Amelunxen (Marval)
- 2006 – Télévision (Marval) tirage à 200 exemplaires numérotés et signés
- 2006 – Tirage limité (Marval) tiré à 1000 exemplaires seulement

== Portfolios ==
- 1986 – Zoo, text by Bernard Lamarche-Vadel, 10 photographs printed and signed by the author, limited edition of 15 copies
- 1988 – Nus de femmes, 10 photographs printed and signed by the author, limited edition of 15 numbered copies
- 2000 – Notes sur la reproduction, 17 photographs printed and signed by the author, limited edition of 5 numbered copies
- 2001 – Propositions, 15 photographs printed and signed by the author, limited edition of 5 numbered copies
- 2002 – Placebo, 25 photographs printed and signed by the author, limited edition of 5 numbered copies
- 2003 – Fracture (degré 0), 14 photographs printed and signed by the author, limited edition of 5 numbered copies
- 2004 – Vers le noir, 5 color photos and 5 black and white photos printed and signed by the author, limited edition to 5 numbered copies

== Filmography ==
- Interview with Bernard Lamarche-Vadel, production: Maison européenne de la photographie (30 min)
