= Louise L. Lambrichs =

French novelist and essayist

Louise L. Lambrichs (born 2 May 1952) is a French novelist and essayist.

Lambrichs was born into a family of writers in Boulogne-Billancourt. Her father Georges Lambrichs (along with Jean Paulhan and Jérôme Lindon) was considered one of the greatest French-speaking editors of the second half of the 20th century. Her mother Gilberte Lambrichs who translated the works of Fritz Zorn and Thomas Bernhard wrote under the pseudonym Constance Delaunay.

Lambrichs, who studied philosophy, has published more than a dozen works of which probably the most famous are "Journal d'Hannah" and "Le Jeu du roman".

Along with Caroline Eliacheff, she wrote an original scenario for Claude Chabrol's film The Flower of Evil (2003). Then Aruna Villiers directed the film À ton image based on her novel (2004).

In 2005, she published Nous ne verrons jamais Vukovar ("We are never going to see Vukovar"), an analysis of the wars in the former Yugoslavia based on a study of a book by Peter Handke and her own experiences in the field of psychoanalysis.

== Bibliography ==
- 2005: Nous ne verrons jamais Vukovar, novel
- 2003: Le cas Handke, conversation à bâtons rompus, novel
- 2002: Aloïs ou La nuit devant nous, novel
- 2001: Naître... et naître encore, novel
- 2001: 'Chemin faisant, novel
- 1998: Les Révoltés de Villefranche mutinerie d'un bataillon de Waffen SS, septembre 1943, co-authored with Mirko D. Grmek
- 1998: À ton image, novel
- 1995: Le Livre de Pierre, Psychisme et cancer, essay
- 1995: Le jeu du roman, novel
- 1993: Journal d'Hannah, novel
- 1987: Le Cercle des sorcières, novel
- Grmek : La vie, les maladies et l'histoire (tome 2)
- Mirko D. Grmek, un humaniste européen engagé (tome 1)
