= Constance Delaunay =

French translator and writer

Constance Delaunay (1922 in Brussels – 11 July 2013 in Paris) was the pen name of Gilberte Lambrichs, French translator, playwright, novelist and short stories writer.

She was Georges Lambrichs's wife and Louise Lambrichs's mother.

She translated from German into French, works by Thomas Bernhard, Max Frisch, Fritz Zorn on behalf of éditions Gallimard.

== Works ==
- 1967: Une Mauvaise lecture, short stories, Paris, Éditions Gallimard, "Collection Blanche", 199 p. BnF 32977473n
- 1977: La Donna - Olympe dort, theatre, Gallimard, series "Le Manteau d'Arlequin", 94 p. BnF 34591850n
- 1984: Rose ou la Confidente, Gallimard, series "Le Manteau d'Arlequin", 115 p. ISBN 2-07-070150-6
- 1988: Les Rideaux, theatre, Gallimard, series "Le Manteau d'Arlequin", 98 p. ISBN 2-07-071268-0
- 1991: Leçon de chant, short stories, Gallimard, Collection Blanche, 159 p. ISBN 2-07-072365-8
- 1994: Les Éventails de l'impératrice, short stories, Gallimard, Collection Blanche, 189 p. ISBN 2-07-073949-X
- 1996: Octavie dans tous ses états, novel, Gallimard, Collection Blanche, 163 p. ISBN 2-07-074363-2
- 1997: Le Portrait, theatre, Gallimard, Collection Blanche, 88 p. ISBN 2-07-074792-1
- 1998: Qu'est-ce qu'on attend ?, short stories, Gallimard, Collection Blanche, 207 p. ISBN 2-07-075383-2

- Prix de la Nouvelle de l'Académie française 1999

- 1999: Conversations avec Federmann, novel, Gallimard, Collection Blanche, 254 p. ISBN 2-07-075709-9
- 2003: Autour d'un plat. Menus et propos, Gallimard, Collection Blanche, 213 p. ISBN 2-07-076658-6
- 2004: Sur quel pied danser, short stories, Gallimard, Collection Blanche, 150 p. ISBN 2-07-077216-0

- Grand Prix Société des Gens de Lettres de la nouvelle 2004

- 2006! La Tsarine, Gallimard, Collection Blanche, 81 p. ISBN 2-07-078126-7
