= Georges Lambrichs =

French writer

Georges Lambrichs (5 July 1917 – 9 February 1992) was a French writer, literary critic and editor.

== Life ==
Labrichts was born in Brussels. After studying philosophy, he met Jean Paulhan in 1937 of whom he became a "companion of intellectual resistance". Paulhan made him a reader in March 1946 on behalf of the Éditions de Minuit, where Lambrichs had his first book published.

Still at the Éditions de Minuit, he co-hosted with Paulhan the revue 84, which Gaston Gallimard did not want and became literary director until 1955. At Minuit, he published among others François Augiéras, Pierre Klossowski, Samuel Beckett, Alain Robbe-Grillet, and Michel Butor.

After a brief stint at Grasset, Gaston Gallimard hired him in January 1959: first as director of series of contemporary literature with Jeune Prose, which lasted from February 1959 to June 1962 and which brought out the first texts by Jacques Chessex and Jean-Loup Trassard. A veritable laboratory that seeks to distance itself from the Nouveau roman and structuralism, Le Chemin functioned quite autonomously within the Éditions Gallimard, Lambrichs surrounding himself with a group of sensibilities, authors such as Michel Chaillou, Michel Butor, Michel Deguy, Henri Meschonnic, Jacques Réda, Jacques Borel, Pierre Bourgeade, Jean-Loup Trassard and of course J. M. G. Le Clézio.

Between 1959 and 1992, Le Chemin published 284 titles, including essays by Michel Foucault, Henri Meschonnic and Jean Starobinski.

In 1967, Lambrichs, in addition to his collection, edited the magazine Les Cahiers du Chemin, which merged in 1977 with La Nouvelle Revue française when he took over from Marcel Arland as its director until 1987.

Georges and Gilberte Lambrichs are the parents of Louise L. Lambrichs.

Lambrichs died in Paris at the age of 74.

== Publications ==
- L'Aventure achevée, Éditions de Minuit, 1946; réédition Éditions de la Différence, 1991
- Le Pouvoir des cris, in Les Cahiers de la Pléiade, Gallimard, avril 1947
- Chaystre ou les Plaisirs incommodes, Éditions de Minuit, 1948; réédition Éditions de la Différence, 1983
- Les Rapports absolus, coll. Métamorphoses, Gallimard, 1949
- Les Plus Belles Images du cinéma, Éditions du Chêne, 1949
- Mort naturelle, Gallimard, Les Cahiers de la Pléiade, printemps-été 1951
- Ondique, Gallimard, 1954
- Les Fines Attaches, Gallimard, 1957
- En cachette, Gallimard, 1957
- Bernard Dufour, Galerie Pierre, 1963
- Pente douce, L'Herne, 1972; réédition Éditions de la Différence, 1983
- Mégéries, Gallimard, 1974
- Se prendre aux mots, Éditions de la Différence, 1991
- Gabrielle Haardt, Éditions de la Différence, 1992
