= Zou (TV series) =

Children's animated television series

- Based on: Zou by Michel Gay
- Directed by: Olivier Lelardoux
- Voices of: Rosin Gadd; Maisie Jack; Kate Harbour; Jimmy Hibbert; Christopher Miltiadou; Paul Panting; Rob Rackstraw; Amanda Root; Jo Wyatt
- Composers: Rick Mullhall; Ian Nicholls
- Countries of origin: France; Singapore
- No. of seasons: 3
- No. of episodes: 156

Production
- Executive producer: Hélène Maret
- Producers: Billy Richard; Pierre Sissmann
- Running time: 11 minutes
- Production companies: Cyber Group Studios; Scrawl Studios

Original release
- Network: France 5 (formerly); Disney Junior; M6 (formerly); Télé-Québec; TiVi5 Monde; MBC (formerly)
- Release: May 2012 – 2018

Zou is an animated children's television series inspired by the books of French author Michel Gay. The show was produced by the French company Cyber Group Studios for Disney EMEA. It premiered on PBS kids in May 2012.

== Premise and format ==
Zou is about the day-to-day life and adventures of a young anthropomorphic zebra colt, Zou (Bizou), his sidekick Poc the parakeet, and his family and friends. Most episodes contain the name "Zou" in the title and usually take place at Zou's house or in his backyard, or some other silly place. Zou lives with his mother, father, grandparents, and great-grandmother. Each episode features some simple problem or issue that Zou must deal with, usually with the assistance of his family and friends.

== Characters ==
- Bizou Zebra (Zou): A 5-year-old, fun-loving zebra colt. Zou is generally clad in a white T-shirt under yellow overalls. He is the main protagonist of the show, and shows interest in many career paths. His next-door neighbor is Elzee. A running plot of the show is that Zou exits school at the beginning of the episode. Then Zou mentions an interest in a certain career. He is then countered by neighbor Elzee stating "I thought you wanted to be a (other career path)." Zou responds by saying "That was last week, now I want to be a (new career path.)" Voiced in the U.S. version by Kannon Gowen.
- Poc Zebra: A Quaker parakeet who is Zou's best friend and sidekick. It is unclear whether Poc is considered a pet or a "person", since several signs of anthropomorphism are shown in Poc's character, and yet Poc cannot talk, he only chirps. Also, it seems like the show's conception of "humans" is reserved to zebras only. Poc lives inside what looks like a cuckoo clock in Zou's bedroom.
- Elzee Zebra: A zebra filly who is Zou's next-door neighbor. The same age as Zou, Elzee is generally clad in a long purple dress. Her ears seem to be rather large, in comparison to the other characters, and even make her slightly taller than Zou. She is far more sensible than Zou and often contradicts his outrageous ideas, but still joins in. She seems to harbour a romantic attraction to Zou, often acting shy or giggling with reembarrassment when he compliments her. She is a bit more of a tomboy than Zinnia and seems to enjoy soccer, often taking part in Zou's extravagant activities. In the British English version of the show her voice is portrayed by Roisin Gadd (Seasons 1 & 2) and Maisie Jack (Season 3) and in the American English version, she is voiced by Cherami Leigh.
- Zinnia Zebra: Another zebra filly who is Zou's cousin. She's a budding ballerina who sometimes tends to be snooty and stuck-up. She is never seen without dance clothes on and is more feminine in comparison to Elzee who is a bit more tomboyish. It seems that she is an unofficial antagonist of the show. Zou does not seem to like her very much and often makes excuses to avoid having to play with her. She often tries to engage Zou in girlish pastimes such as playing princesses or playing with dolls / stuffed toys, apparently unaware he has absolutely no interest in such things. Despite being a snob, Zinnia is sometimes shown to care for Zou.
- Zak Zebra: An eager and chubby young zebra colt, and another of Zou's friends. He is slightly younger than Zou and Elzee and is generally clad in a red T-shirt, with what appears to be a lime green letter "J" on it, and khaki shorts. His father is Mr. Zoey. No mother of Zak has ever been mentioned.
- Daddy Zebra: Zou's father.
- Mummy Zebra ("Mommy Zebra" in the U.S. version): Zou's mother, who often calls him by his full name, "Bizou." She works at a local hospital.
- Grandpa Zebra: Zou's paternal grandfather. He is a rather handy zebra, usually found in the garage, building something.
- Grandma Zebra: Zou's paternal grandmother. She is often found baking cakes and other confections.
- Nanny Zebra: Zou's great-grandmother. She often gives Zou big, sloppy kisses on the cheek. She is talented on the piano, able to play the show's theme song among other songs, and also sings. According to the show's official website, she is slightly deaf.
- Uncle Zavier: Zinnia's father. He is a wealthy businessman and owns the largest house in the neighborhood. Though you never see this in the show.
- Aunt Zelda: Zinnia's mother. She runs the family's high-end boutique alongside Uncle Zavier.
- Mr. Zoey: The local shopkeeper/postman, and Zak's father. He is friendly and helpful.
- Mrs. Brenda Zolli: The school crossing guard.

== Broadcast ==
The series airs on Disney Junior channels in Australia, New Zealand, the United Kingdom, Ireland, Portugal, and Disney Junior (Latin America), as well as Super RTL. The program premiered in France on 22 December 2012, on France 5. It premiered in the U.S. on Universal Kids (then called PBS Kids Sprout) on 2 September 2013, and has been shown on NBC Kids until 2016, complete with a dub into American English. The American dub was available in the United States on Hulu Plus until 10 December 2019, and can still be watched on Amazon Prime Video and YouTube via the official "ZOU in English" channel.

The episodes, lasting 11 minutes each, are generally transmitted two at a time, the second immediately after the first one, except on some channels such as PBS Kids Sprout, NIKI Junior in Ukraine, and Clan in Spain, where the episodes are shown individually. In Wales it is shown on S4C in Welsh as Stiw And TG4 In Ireland.

== Episodes ==
=== Season 1 (2012–14) ===
No.	Title	Written by	Original release date
1	"Zou the Chef"	Jimmy Hibbert	4 May 2014
Zou helps Grandma bake a cake for Mother's Day, but Dad accidentally eats it. Zou decides to make another cake on his own, with disastrous consequences.
2	"Zou Goes Camping"	Laura Beaumont and Paul Larson	2 September 2013
Zou and Elzee prepare to go on a camping trip in Zou's backyard.
3	"Zou Goes Mountaineering"	Laura Beaumont and Paul Larson	8 September 2013
Zou and Grandpa pretend that they are mountaineers and that the stairs are a mountain to climb with.
4	"Zou's Ant Farm"	Ross Hastings	9 September 2013
Zou decides he wants a pet and tries his luck at owning an ant farm.
5	"King Zou"	Darren Jones	4 September 2013
Zou declares the house "Zouland", and makes himself king. Mum and Dad set him some challenges before he can officially become king.
6	"Zou the Postman"	Lee Pressman	5 September 2013
Zou tries his luck at delivering mail to his family and neighbours.
7	"Zou's Drum"	Darren Jones	10 September 2013
On his birthday, Zou gets a drum from his uncle Ziggy. His loud playing disturbs the family.
8	"Zou's Teething Ring"	Darren Jones	7 September 2013
Zou tries to hide his old teething ring before Zinnia discovers it and makes fun of him.
9	"Zou Leaves Home"	Jimmy Hibbert and Darren Jones	3 September 2013
Zou is told he's making too much noise, so he decides to leave home.
10	"Zou's Mission to Mars"	Laura Beaumont and Paul Larson	12 September 2013
Zou and Elzee, with Grandpa's help, pretend they are astronauts on their way to Mars.
11	"Goldie the Sunflower"	Laura Beaumont and Paul Larson	11 September 2013
Zou brings home his class's sunflower, Goldie, to take care of over the weekend, but then he worries that Goldie is sad. Zou makes Goldie the Sunflower happy again sometimes.
12	"Zou the Detective"	Marie Beardmore	6 September 2013
Inspired by his favorite TV show, Zou plays at being a detective, apart from Nana's missing dentures.
13	"Zou and the Camera"	Marie Beardmore	26 October 2013
Zou borrows his dad's camera to complete a school assignment.
14	"Zou and Elzee's Fashion Show"	Laura Beaumont and Paul Larson	23 June 2012
When Elzee shows Zou her new dress, she and Zou decide to have a fashion show.
15	"Zou and the Doctor"	Laura Beaumont and Paul Larson	15 September 2013
Poc is sick and he needs to go to the doctor. Zou tries to calm down the terrified bird, only to be scared himself when he learns he needs an injection.
16	"The Daily Zou"	Laura Beaumont and Paul Larson	14 September 2013
Zou makes his newspaper but has trouble finding a good story.
17	"Zou the Artist"	Darren Jones, Laura Beaumont, and Paul Larson	13 September 2013
Zou attempts to enter an art competition at the park, but when he copies his friends' art, he makes his art into a collage.
18	"Zou's Scarecrow"	Laura Beaumont and Paul Larson	16 September 2013
Zou and Grandpa decide to make a scarecrow to protect his seeds, but when they do, they upset Poc by scaring him.
19	"Zou's Promise"	Darren Jones and Ross Hastings	18 September 2013
Zou makes several promises but finds it hard to keep them.
20	"Zou's Walkie Talkie"	Jimmy Hibbert, Darren Jones, Laura Beaumont, and Paul Larson	19 September 2013
Zou gets a pair of walkie-talkies and uses them to communicate with his family members.
21	"Super Zou"	Darren Jones	21 September 2013
Zou becomes a superhero and helps Nana, who is stuck up the stairs in the middle of the night.
22	"Zou and the Rainbow"	Laura Beaumont and Paul Larson	17 September 2013
Zou and Elzee try to find the end of a rainbow and create an original surprise when they attempt to find a pot of gold.
23	"Zou's Cherry Pie"	Laura Beaumont and Paul Larson	20 September 2013
Zou bakes a cherry pie for a contest, but Grandpa loses his garage keys among the cherries.
24	"A Halloween Hunt"	Laura Beaumont and Paul Larson	27 October 2013
Unable to go to the town's Halloween costume party because of rain, Zou, Elzee and Zinnia hunt for the ingredients for Grandma's Halloween cookies and Zou's Family, Elzee and Zinnia toffee apples.
25	"Zou and the Caterpillar"	Laura Beaumont and Paul Larson	27 September 2013
While helping Grandpa harvest potatoes, Zou and Zinnia find a caterpillar. Zinnia is scared at first, but Grandpa shows her how a caterpillar can become a butterfly.
26	"Zou and Zonk, the Giant Dinosaur"	Laura Beaumont and Paul Larson	24 September 2013
Zou, Elzee, and Grandpa build a dinosaur out of cardboard boxes, pillows, and a sheet.
27	"Zou's Soccer Match"	Laura Beaumont and Paul Larson	25 September 2013
When Zou, Elzee, and Zak are playing a game of football in the park, Poc feels left out because he's been mixing up the players by whistling.
28	"Zou's Bicycle"	Laura Beaumont and Paul Larson	26 September 2013
After seeing Elzee on her new bike, Zou asks for one too. Grandpa fixes up his old bike and gives it to Zou, who learns that new things aren't always better.
29	"Zou's Dance"	Diane Redmond, Jimmy Hibbert, Darren Jones, Marie Beardmore, Laura Beaumont and Paul Larson	22 September 2013
Zinnia talks Zou into entering a dance contest. He partners up with Elzee, with surprising results.
30	"Zou's Pantomime"	Darren Jones	28 September 2013
After a pantomime in the park is canceled, Zou decides to make one of his own, with a little help from his friends and family.
31	"Zou's Circus"	Darren Jones	29 September 2013
Zou, Elzee, and Zak decide to make a circus. Zack has trouble finding an act that suits him until he discovers his skill as a clown.
32	"Zou Up High"	Darren Jones	14 October 2013
Grandpa gets Zou and Elzee tickets for a hot-air balloon ride. Zou is scared at the idea of being up so high until Grandpa helps him see otherwise.
33	"Zou's Bucket"	Darren Jones	3 October 2013
Zou suggests the family have a water-saving "bucket day", but things don't go quite as planned.
34	"Zou's Rainy Day"	Darren Jones	18 October 2013
When the family's trip to the seaside is canceled due to rain, Zou must find another way to have fun.

=== Season 2 (2013–15) ===
No.	Title	Written by	Original release date
35	"Zou and the Easter Bunny"	Laura Beaumont and Paul Larson	14 April 2014
Zou and Elzee decide to go looking for the Easter Bunny. Zou, Elzee, and Zak find some easter eggs sometimes.
36	"Zou and the Elephant Trap Rescue"	Laura Beaumont and Paul Larson	1 October 2013
It was written by Laura Beaumont and Paul Larson. After watching a news report about an escaped elephant, Zou sets out to trap the animal.
37	"Zou and the Stripey Things"	Laura Beaumont and Paul Larson	6 October 2013
After learning about "stripey things" in school, Zou becomes scared of anything with yellow-and-black stripes.
38	"Zou the Clown"	Laura Beaumont and Paul Larson	15 October 2013
After hearing about circuses from Mr. Zoey, Zou becomes a clown and tries to cheer up a sad Elzee.
39	"The Big Race"	Laura Beaumont and Paul Larson	9 October 2013
Zou's hopes for having a pedal-car race with Elzee are dashed when his dad twists his ankle, and Zou has to help look after him.
40	"Pirates and Fairies"	Laura Beaumont and Paul Larson	13 October 2013
While the friends are playing at the park, Zou and Zinnia disagree about what are "boy's games" and "girl's games".
41	"Zou's Garage Sale"	Laura Beaumont and Paul Larson	8 October 2013
Zou decides to sell some of his old toys at the family's garage sale, but regrets doing so afterwards.
42	"The Fancy Dress Party"	Laura Beaumont and Paul Larson	2 October 2013
Zou's plans to win a fancy dress contest at Elzee's keep getting dashed, as each costume he tries is already being worn by someone else.
43	"Zou's Robot"	Lee Pressman	12 October 2013
Zou rushes to gather enough cereal box tokens to win a toy robot.
44	"The Very Windy Day"	Lee Pressman	4 October 2013
Zou and Grandpa use an old windcheater to fix Zou's kite.
45	"Zou's Magpie"	Marie Beardmore	30 September 2013
When one of Mum's silver earrings goes missing, Zou searches for the culprit.
46	"Zou's Trip"	Lee Pressman	12 October 2013
Zou makes a pretend car of the new washing machine's box, and, together with Elzee, Zinnia, and Zak, takes a pretend trip to the seaside.
47	"Zou's Comet"	Marie Beardmore and Darren Jones	5 October 2013
Zou and his family prepare a party to celebrate the passing of the Zebra Comet, after they make our telescope, while they start on the party food, which only comes by once every eighty years to come sometimes.
48	"Zou's Aquarium"	Marie Beardmore and Darren Jones	10 October 2013
Elzee gives up going to the aquarium to look for her lost bear, Elmo. Zou & Grandpa make Elzee a pretend aquarium to cheer her up sometimes.
49	"Zou and the Power Cut Outage"	Laura Beaumont and Paul Larson	16 October 2013
Inside Zou's house, Zou, Elzee, and family were very, very, very, very, very busy. Zou and Elzee cannot play video games "Master Zine Ruled of Universe" to no electricity and must find other things to entertain themselves. Now they play the instruments and clean the room, then Simon says, then they need to get some sponges and some water to wash the car, and then shadow puppets two little zebras, and power come back on now they finish the video games. Then Zou turns off the TV and lights off, and they have a power cut for a little bit longer. And they save money on the electric bill sometimes.
50	"Zou Owns Up"	Marie Beardmore and Darren Jones	17 October 2013
When Zou accidentally breaks Zak's toy red race car it looks too scared to tell him sometimes.
51	"Zou the Magician"	Marie Beardmore and Darren Jones	23 September 2013
Zou accidentally makes Poc disappear.
52	"Zou Says Sorry"	Lizzie Ennever and Dave Ingham	7 October 2013
Zou finishes building a model airplane, but it later accidentally breaks after being moved to dust a windowsill. Zou jumps to conclusions and blames his pet bird, Poc, for breaking it. Poc gets visibly upset and goes to sit high up out of reach. With the guidance of Grandpa, Zou learns that he hurt Poc's feelings. He realizes he shouldn't have shifted the blame and finally apologizes, saying that "special word"—sorry—to make things right and restore their friendship.
53	"Tic Toc"	Dave Ingham	1 April 2015
Excited for his play date with Elzee, Zou changes the time on his clock one hour forward so she can come over, unaware that the rest of the family have important things to do at the same time, too, creating total confusion and chaos.
54	"Zou Plays Hide and Seek"	Dave Ingham and Rachel Dawson	1 April 2015
Zou, Elzee, and Grandpa play hide and seek, and Zou and Elzee are hiding. But Grandpa soon forgets they're playing when he helps Elzee's mom with some problems.
55	"Zou's Alien Hunt"	TBA	TBA
56	"Zou the Inventor"	TBA	TBA
57	"Zou and the Best Present"	TBA	TBA
58	"Zou and Nanna's Hat"	TBA	TBA
59	"Zou and the Mystery Box"	TBA	TBA
60	"Zou the First Aider"	TBA	TBA
61	"Zou's Igloo"	TBA	TBA
62	"Zou the Waiter"	TBA	TBA
63	"Zou and the Abominable Snowman"	Ciaran Murtagh and Andrew Jones	TBA
64	"Zou the Repairman"	TBA	TBA
65	"Zou and the Football"	TBA	TBA
66	"Zou and the Baby Bird"	TBA	TBA
67	"Zou's Boat Race"	TBA	TBA
68	"Zou and the Hermit Crab"	TBA	TBA

=== Season 3 (2015–18) ===
No.	Title	Written by	Original release date
70	"Zou's Camouflage"	Unknown	12 April 2015
71	"Zou and the Dinosaur Egg"	Unknown	23 April 2015
72	"Zou and the Water Race"	TBA	TBA
73	"Commander Zou"	Marie Beardmore	23 April 2015
Grandpa helps Zou see up a tree with a homemade periscope. It's such a success Zou makes a homemade submarine next.
78	"Zou Gets Framed"	Unknown	23 April 2015
82	"Zou and the Missing Page"	Marie Beardmore	23 April 2015
85	"Zou and the Hungry Magpie"	Unknown	23 April 2015
92	"Nanna's Memory Book"	Unknown	22 April 2015
102	"Zou Cleans Up"	Unknown	23 April 2015
103	"Zou to the Rescue"	Unknown	17 July 2017
Zou and Grandpa choose their friendship with Uncle Zavier and Zinnia over victory in an orienteering competition.
106	"Zou's Mascot"	Unknown	18 July 2017
106	"Zou and the Ideal Day"	Unknown	18 July 2017
107	"Zou's Footprints"	Unknown	9 June 2018
Zou plays Footprints in the Snow with Grandpa, They must follow a trail of footprints left in the snow. But has Zou been too sneaky? Has he lost Elzee and Zinnia forever?
108	"Zou's Fern"	Unknown	23 April 2015
109	"Zou and Nanna's Blues"	Unknown	30 June 2018
When Nanna gently bemoans the fact that in her young days, things were all so much slower; and everyone was more polite, Zou tries to recreate those days for her.
112	"Zou the Tightrope Walker"	Unknown	17 May 2018
The youngsters have to decide which gymnastic activity they wish to partake in. Zou decides he'd like to do Slacklining, but he needs three companions.
113	"Zou the Ballet Dancer"	Unknown	10 March 2018
Zinnia asks Zou to join her ballet class. At first, he declines because he thinks it's boring but soon learns it's athletic, muscular, and a lot of fun.
114	"Gym Time"	Unknown	18 March 2018
The sports sessions have been muddled up. Zou and Zak's tennis has been double booked with Elzee's and Zinnia's ballet so the world's first ballet/tennis session takes place.
115	"Zou Sells Out"	Unknown	3 March 2018
Zou plays a crucial role in boosting sales at Zavier and Zelda's shop during the holiday season.
116	"Zou's Carrier Bird"	Unknown	24 June 2018
The snow has cut off all communication. Nanna tells Zou that in earlier days, pigeons were used to carry messages, and he wonders if Poc could act as a messenger bird.
117	"Zou and the Tortoise"	Unknown	23 April 2015
Zou reunites a missing tortoise with its owner.
118	"Zou Too"	Unknown	7 July 2018
Zigmund and Zoroaster make a waxwork model of Zou. It's so realistic, when it's put in the window of Uncle Zavier's shop it's mistaken for the real Zou by Dad, Elzee, and even Poc!
119	"Aunt Zelda's Birthday Present"	Unknown	23 June 2018
Zinnia wants to make her mother a present – and with Zou's help (and a little subterfuge) this ambition is fulfilled.
120	"Zou's Flight of Fancy"	Unknown	14 July 2018
Zou isn't sure what costume to wear for Zinnia's fancy dress party – until he hits on the idea of being a dinosaur. He makes the costume, but then gives it to Zak who doesn't have one.
121	"Return of the Piano"	Unknown	15 July 2018
When Nanna gets her piano back after lending it for the disco, it isn't playing properly. Zavier has lost his shop keys – could this have anything to do with the malfunctioning piano?

== International versions ==
- English (UK)
- Zou
- Disney Junior (UK and Ireland) (formerly)
- Disney Junior (Australia and New Zealand) (formerly)
- Disney Junior (Southeast Asia) (formerly)
- Disney Junior (Europe, Middle East and Africa)
- Sensical
- Kidoodle.TV
- MBC (formerly)
- English (United States)
- Zou
- PBS Kids Sprout (formerly)
- NBC (formerly)
- German
- Zeo
- Super RTL (formerly)
- TOGGO Plus (formerly)
- Disney Junior (formerly)
- Disney Channel (formerly)
- Russian
- Непоседа Зу
- Karusel
- Ukrainian
- Малятко Зу
- Niki Junior
