= À ton image =

2004 film directed by Aruna Villiers

- Directed by: Aruna Villiers
- Written by: Louise Lambrichs (book); Aruna Villiers
- Produced by: Virginie Silla
- Starring: Nastassja Kinski; Christopher Lambert; Audrey DeWilder; Rufus; Andrzej Seweryn; Francine Bergé
- Cinematography: Gérard Sterin
- Edited by: Olivier Gajan; Joëlle Hache
- Distributed by: EuropaCorp
- Release date: 26 May 2004 (France)
- Running time: 94 minutes
- Country: France
- Language: French
- Budget: ~ €7,800,000

À ton image is a 2004 French film directed by Aruna Villiers. The story, based on the 1998 novel À ton image by Louise L. Lambrichs, is about a couple whose desire for a child leads them onto dangerous ground.

== Plot ==
Haunted by painful memories and a terrible feeling of guilt a sterile young woman named Mathilde (played by Nastassja Kinski) uses extreme cloning methods to give birth to Manon (Audrey DeWilder), and is comforted by her obstetrician husband Thomas (Christopher Lambert). Manon starts off as a very normal child but then suffers from intense nightmares, that we later uncover to be her mother's memories. The child's growth is abnormally rapid and she becomes the splitting image of her mother. Manon becomes determined to destroy her mother's life, even showing affection for Mathilde's husband Thomas. Manon eventually learns what happened to her brother who drowned in the well at the back of their property. Gradually, the relation between them evolves in an odd manner as Manon takes over her mother's role in the family.

== Cast ==
- Nastassja Kinski as Mathilde
- Christopher Lambert as Thomas
- Audrey Dewilder as Manon
- Jeanne Buchard as Manon (at the age of 5)
- Francine Bergé as Mathilde's mother
- Rufus (Jacques Narcy) as Mathilde's father
- Andrzej Seweryn as Professeur Cardoze
- Raoul Billerey as the father of Thomas
- Lyes Salem as Antoine
- Christian Hecq as Gaëtan
- Sandra Cheres as Claire
- Isabelle Caubère as the principal
- Paloma Martin Y Prada as the nurse
- Pierre Poirot as the doctor
