= Gérard Pussey =

French writer and novelist

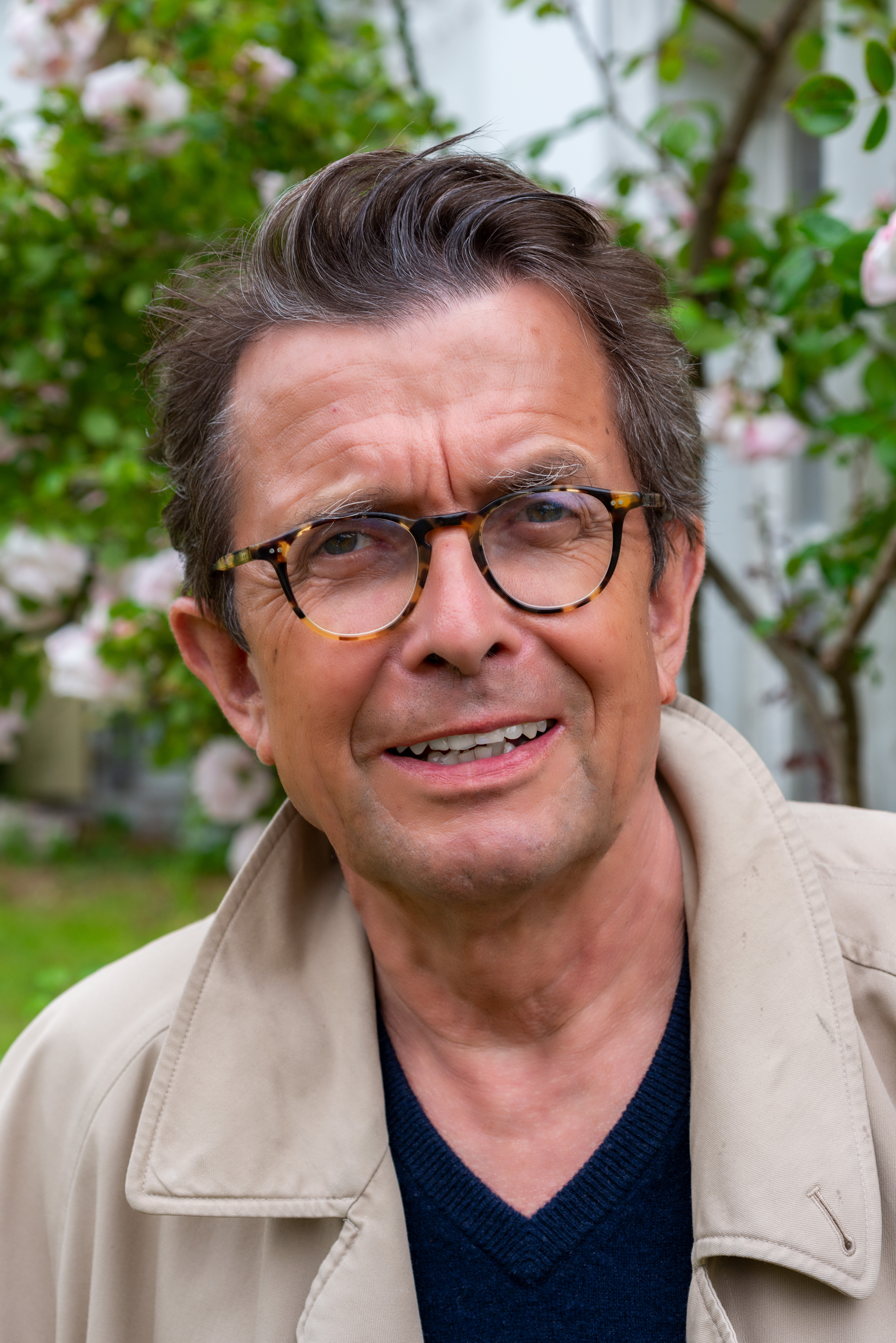
- Born: 20 June 1947 (age 79); Villeneuve-Saint-Georges, France

Gérard Pussey (born 20 June 1947) is a French writer and novelist.

== Biography ==
Gérard was born in Villeneuve-Saint-Georges. A journalist and literary critic, Pussey is first of all a novelist. Initiated to literature by his uncle, the writer and screenwriter René Fallet, Pussey is winner of the prix Roger Nimier, (1980), the prix Alexandre Vialatte and that of the Société des gens de lettres. He appeared several times on the last lists of the prix Renaudot and the prix Interallié.

== Work ==
Novels

- Châteaux en Afrique, Éditions Denoël – prix du premier roman.
- L'Homme d'intérieur, Denoël – prix Roger-Nimier and prix littéraire de la vocation.
- L'amour tombé du lit, Denoël – prix Contrepoint
- Piquanchâgne, Médium – prix de la Société des gens de lettres
- Robinson malgré lui, Nil
- Nous deux rue Bleue, Éditions Gallimard
- Ma virée avec mon père, Gallimard
- Mamie Ward, L'École des Loisirs
- Rêves et cauchemars de Georges Mandard, Castor astral
- Une journée pour tout changer, followed by Mort d'un hypocondriaque, éditions du Rocher
- Au temps des vivants, Fayard and Le Livre de Poche, n° 31253
- Les Succursales du ciel, Fayard and Le Livre de Poche, n° 32303

The three "Noires" (novels)

- Menteur, Castor astral – prix Alexandre Vialatte
- Le Libraire et l'Écrivain, Castor astral
- Le Don d'Hélène, éditions Lajouanie

For children

- En attendant ton retour, novel, L'École des loisirs
- Monsieur Max ou le Dernier Combat, novel, L'École des loisirs
- Cent vingt-quatre, tale, L'École des loisirs
- Les Vélos rouillés, tale, L'École des loisirs
- Le Hold-up de la Tour Eiffel, tale, L'École des loisirs
- Le Noël du Père Noël, tale, L'École des loisirs
- Le Chauffeur de l'autocar, tale, L'École des loisirs
- La Nuit du Boufadou, tale, L'École des loisirs

Translation

- Notre prof, novel by Walter Kempowski, L'École des loisirs

In collaboration

- Dictionnaire des illustrateurs, 3 volumes, with Marcus Osterwalder (illustrator), Ides et calendes
- Maux d'excuse, les mots de l'hypocondrie, with Patrice Delbourg, éd. du Cherche-Midi
