= Marianne Alphant =

French writer and literary critic

Marianne Alphant (born 1945 in Paris) is a French writer and literary critic.

A graduate from the École normale supérieure de jeunes filles in 1964 and agrégée de philosophie, Marianne Alphant worked for the daily Libération from 1983 to 1992. She directed the "Revues parlées" of the Centre Georges Pompidou from 1993 to 2010.

== Works ==
- 1975: Grandes « O », Éditions Gallimard
- 1978: Le Ciel à Bezons, Gallimard.
- 1983: L’Histoire enterrée, Éditions P.O.L
- 1993: Monet : une vie dans le paysage, Hazan.
- 1994: Claude Monet en Norvège, Hazan.
- 1998: Pascal : tombeau pour un ordre, Hachette Littératures.
- 2001: Explications. Interviews with Pierre Guyotat, éditions Léo Scheer.
- 2007: Petite nuit, P.O.L.
- 2010: Claude Monet. Cathédrale(s) de Rouen, éditions Point de vues.
- 2013: Ces choses-là P.O.L.
