= Michel-Ange =

Michel-Ange is a French given name, translation of Michelangelo.

It may refer to:

- Michel-Ange Duquesne de Menneville (c. 1700–1778), French Governor of New France
- Michel Ange Houasse (1680-1730), French painter
- René-Michel Slodtz, known in France as Michel-Ange Slodtz (1705-1764), French sculptor

== Places ==
- Michel-Ange – Auteuil (Paris Métro), a station of the Paris Métro, a transfer station between lines 9 and 10
- Michel-Ange – Molitor (Paris Métro), a station of the Paris Métro in the 16th arrondissement
