= Jacques Borel =

French author

Jacques Borel (17 December 1925 in Paris – 25 September 2002) was a French author best known for his 1965 novel L'Adoration (translated into English as The Bond), which won the Prix Goncourt.

== Bibliography ==
- L'Adoration (1965)
- Tata ou De l'Education (1967)
- Le Retour (1970)
- La Dépossession - Journal de Ligenère (1973)
- Commentaires (1974)
- Un Voyage ordinaire (1975)
- Histoire de mes vieux habits (1979)
- Poésie et nostalgie (1979)
- Petite histoire de mes rêves (1981)
- L'enfant voyeur (1987)
- L'Attente. La Clôture (1987)
- Sur les murs du temps (1989)
- Commémorations (1990)
- Le Déferlement (1993)
- Le chocolat est-il une drogue? (1994)
- Journal de la mémoire (1994)
- Propos sur l'autobiographie (1994)
- L'Aveu différé (1997)
- L'Effacement (1998)
- Sur les poètes (1998)
- La Mort de Maximilien Lepage, acteur (2000)
- Ombres et dieux (2001)
- Rue de l'exil (2002)
