= Marval (publisher) =

French photography publishing house

- Parent company: Éditions Vilo
- Founded: 1969; 56 years ago
- Country of origin: France
- Publication types: Photographs
- Official website: Marval

Marval is a French publishing house specializing in photography.
