= List of cities with defensive walls =

The following cities have, or historically had, defensive walls.

== Africa ==
=== Algeria ===
- Algiers
- Ghardaïa
- Timimoun

=== Egypt ===
See List of Egypt castles, forts, fortifications and city walls.

- Al-Fustat
- Cairo
- Damietta

=== Ethiopia ===
- Gondar
- Harar

=== Libya ===
- Apollonia
- Benghazi
- Cyrene
- Derna
- Germa
- Ghadames
- Ghat
- Jaghbub
- Kabaw
- Murzuq
- Nalut
- Sokna
- Tolmeita
- Tripoli
- Waddan

=== Mali ===
- Djenné
- Gao
- Timbuktu

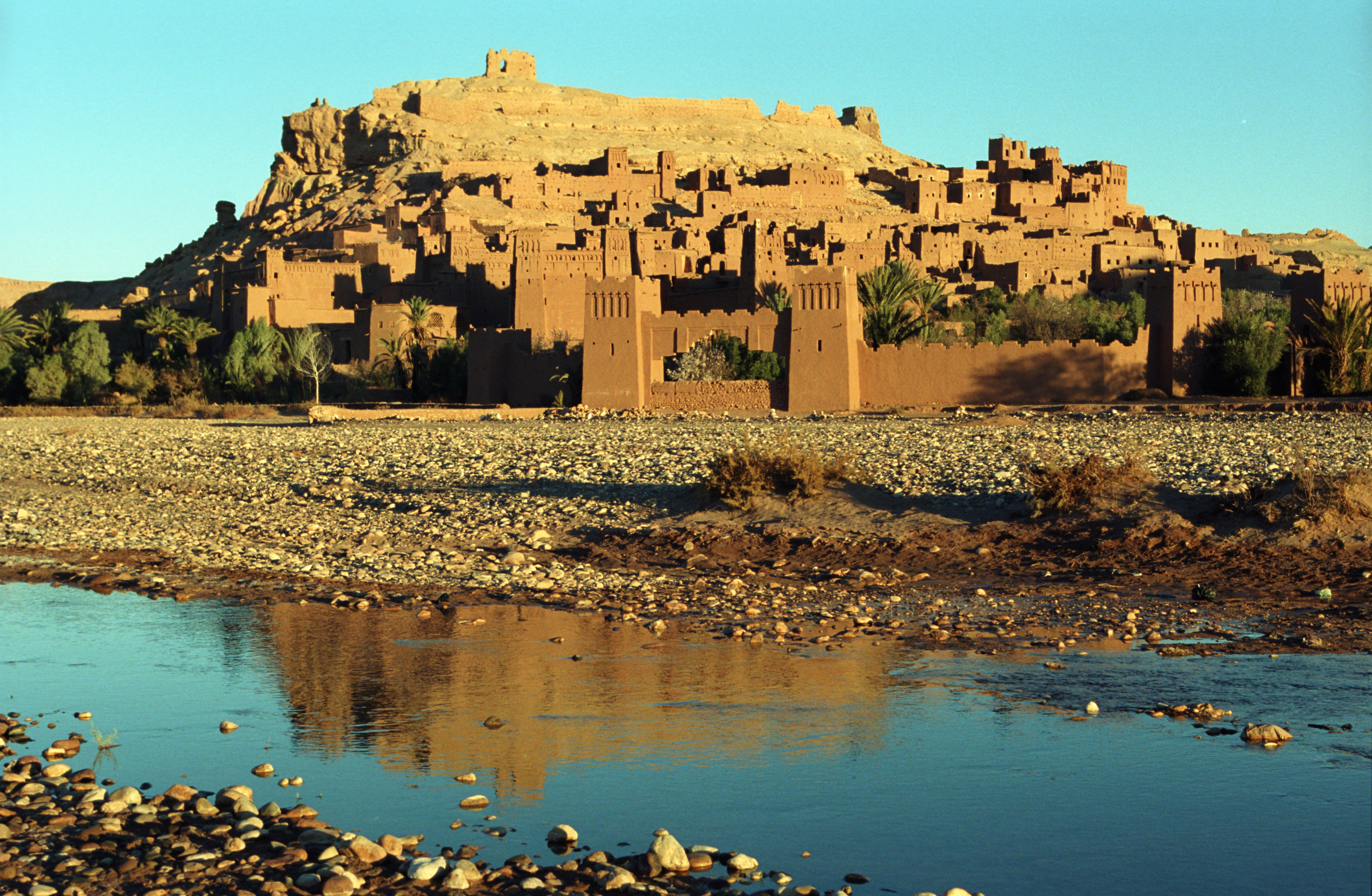
The Kasbah of Aït Benhaddou, High Atlas

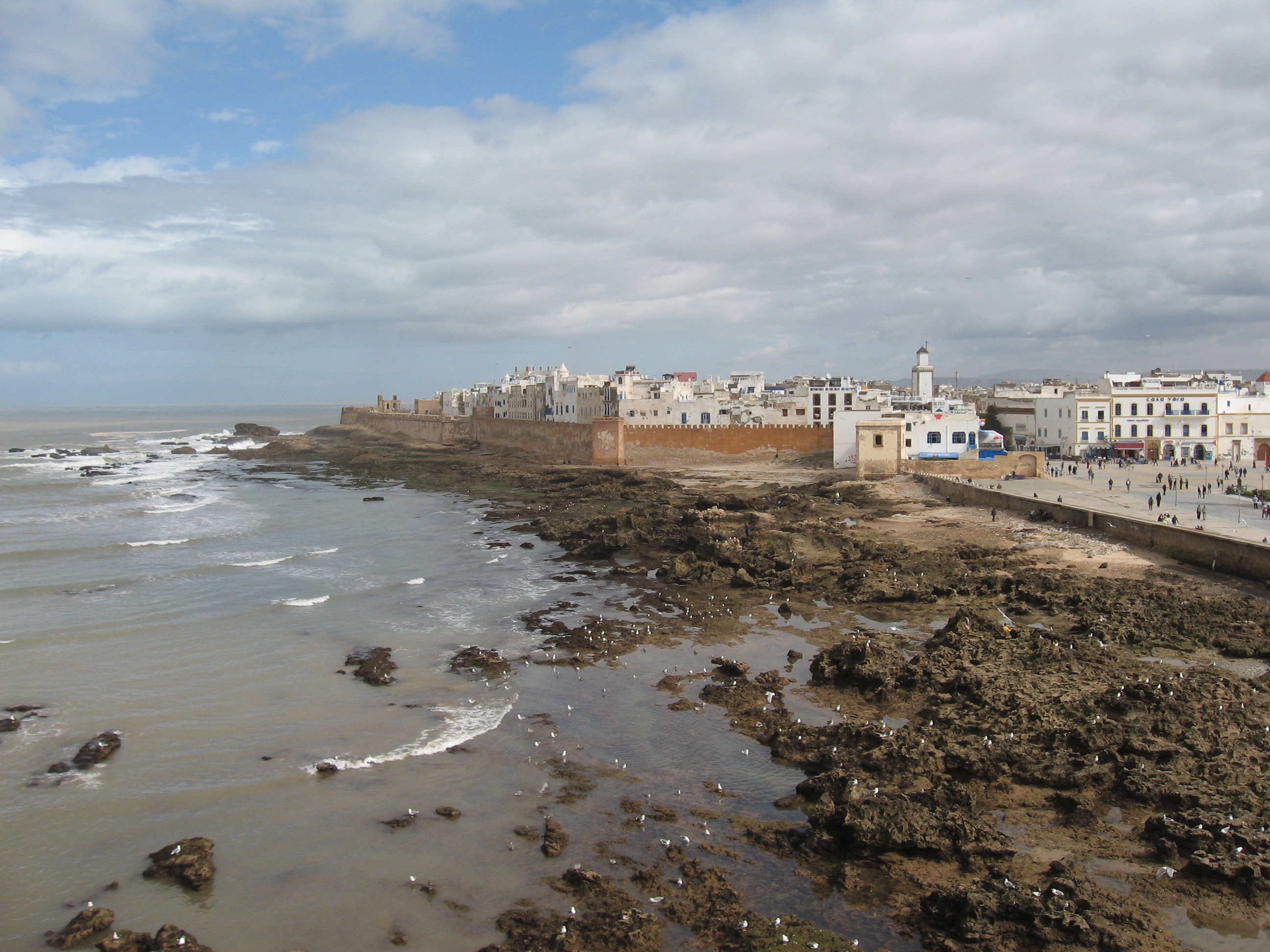
The seaside walls of Essaouira, Morocco

=== Morocco ===
- Agadir
- Aït Benhaddou
- Asilah
- Azemmour
- Casablanca
- Chefchaouen
- El Jadida
- Essaouira
- Fez
- Ksar el-Kebir
- Ksar es-Seghir
- Larache
- Marrakesh
- Meknes
- Moulay Abdallah
- Moulay Idriss
- Ouarzazate
- Oujda
- Rabat
- Safi
- Salé
- Sefrou
- Tangier
- Taroudannt – best preserved in Morocco
- Taza
- Tétouan
- Tiznit

=== Niger ===
- Zinder, Niger was well known for its city wall, the remains of which can still be seen

=== Nigeria ===
- Benin City
- Kano
- Keffi

=== Tunisia ===
- Bizerte
- Hammamet
- Kairouan
- Monastir
- Sfax
- Sousse
- Tozeur
- Tunis

== Americas ==
=== Canada ===
Place	Condition	Image	Notes
Halifax, Nova Scotia	Demolished		Defensive walls were built in 1750 to defend the settlement of Halifax (present day downtown Halifax). Five forts were also built around the city's defensive walls, including the predecessor to Fort George. The walls were taken down in the 1760s.
Louisbourg, Nova Scotia	Demolished (1760); Partially rebuilt (1960s)		Main article: Fortress of Louisbourg Louisbourg was a walled settlement located south of the present community of Louisbourg. The settlement was the capital of the French colony of Île-Royale from 1713 to 1758. After the British capture of Louisbourg, its defensive fortifications were destroyed. During the 1960s and 1970s, one-quarter of the historic settlement was rebuilt in a reconstruction project by the Government of Canada, including portions of its defensive walls.
Montreal	Demolished; remains partially unearthed		Completed in 1744, the walls surrounded most of Old Montreal. The walls were demolished in the beginning of the 19th century, although some of the wall's foundations was left alone, and later buried. The walls’ foundations were later unearthed at the Champ de Mars, and at Pointe-à-Callière Museum.
Quebec City, Quebec	Intact		Main article: Ramparts of Quebec Surrounding most of Old Quebec's Upper Town, construction of the wall began in the 1690s, with additional improvements and restorations done in the following centuries. The southern portion of the walls form a part of the Citadel of Quebec. The citadel is military installation used by the Canadian Armed Forces and an official residence for the monarch and governor general of Canada.
Trois-Rivières, Quebec	Demolished		Main article: Fort Trois-Rivières The first permanent settlement in the area of Trois-Rivières, and the second one in New France, was originally surrounded by a palisade wall with several bastions. Today, there is a plaque marking the site of the fort, although there are no other traces.
Ferryland, Newfoundland and Labrador	Demolished; remains partially unearthed		Ferryland, founded in 1623 by Edward Wynne, was at one point the principal settlement of the Province of Avalon. During its period of existence, the town was surrounded on at least two sides by a ditch, rampart and palisade, with bastions on the corners. Eventually, though, the town was destroyed by the French during the Avalon Peninsula Campaign. In the late 1980s, an archaeological excavation began on the site and has since uncovered the remains of several buildings, the ditch, a cobblestone street and many other features.
Kahnawake, Quebec	Demolished		A fort in Kahnawake was constructed by Jesuit Missionaries in 1725 to protect their mission and the adjacent Iroquois village. A mission fort, Fort Du Sault-Saint-Louis, had four bastions, built of stone with bartizans on the tips. The village was enclosed on all sides by a palisade wall (rebuilt in stone in 1747), consisting of six bastions and one half-bastion. Three large gates pierced the village walls, as well as one small gate and three postern gates. The St. Francis Xavier Mission now occupies the site of the fort, and parts of the walls remain in that area.

=== Chile ===
- Valdivia

=== Colombia ===
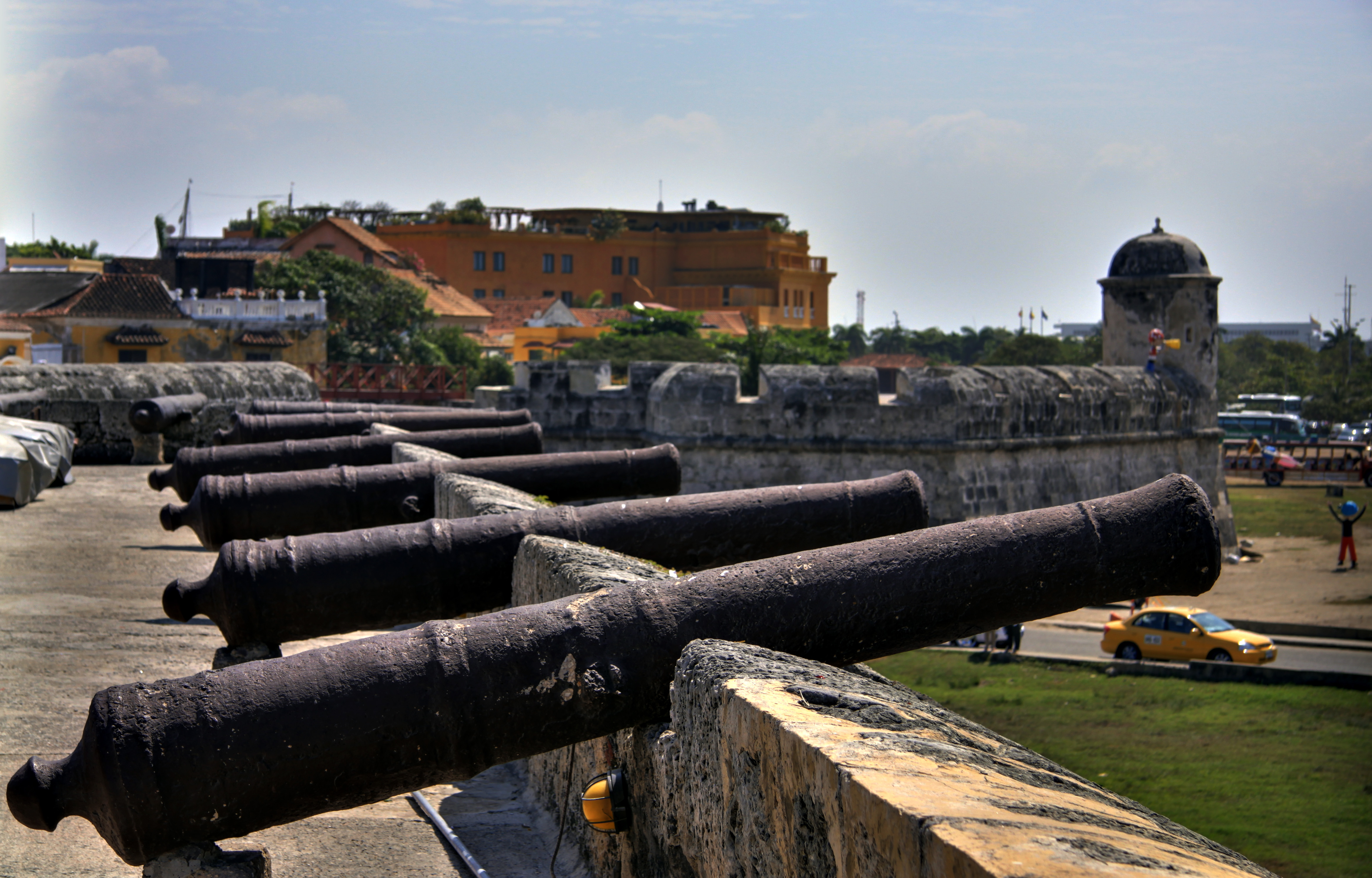
Walls and cannons of the old city of Cartagena

- Cartagena

=== Cuba ===
- Havana

=== Dominican Republic ===
- Santo Domingo was a fortified city from the 16th to the early 20th centuries. Parts of the wall are still visible in the Colonial Zone. One of the main gates is very well preserved and centuries ago was named "The Gate of the Count" after the Count of Peñalba, who stopped the invasion of William Penn and Robert Venables during the Siege of Santo Domingo.

=== Mexico ===
- Campeche – majority of the walls around the old town survive
- Mayapan (Maya ruins)
- Mérida, Yucatán (mostly demolished in the late 19th century, but some segments and arched gateways remain)
- Mexico City (the Aztec city used to have a system of fortifications which was later destroyed during Spanish colonisation)
- Tulum (Maya ruins)
- Veracruz (walls demolished in the 19th century, but a bastion remains)

=== Panama ===
- Old Quarter of Panama City (a portion of the Wall still exists)

=== Peru ===
- Lima
- Trujillo

=== Puerto Rico ===
- Old San Juan- The historical district of Old San Juan covers the entire area of the walled city of San Juan Bautista, also known as La Llave de las Indias (The Key to the Indies), Puerto Rico's colonial capital. The district includes Castillo San Felipe del Morro, Castillo San Cristóbal, La Fortaleza, El Cañuelo and other fortresses part of the Walls of Old San Juan, which still encircle seventy-five percent of the colonial city.

=== United States ===
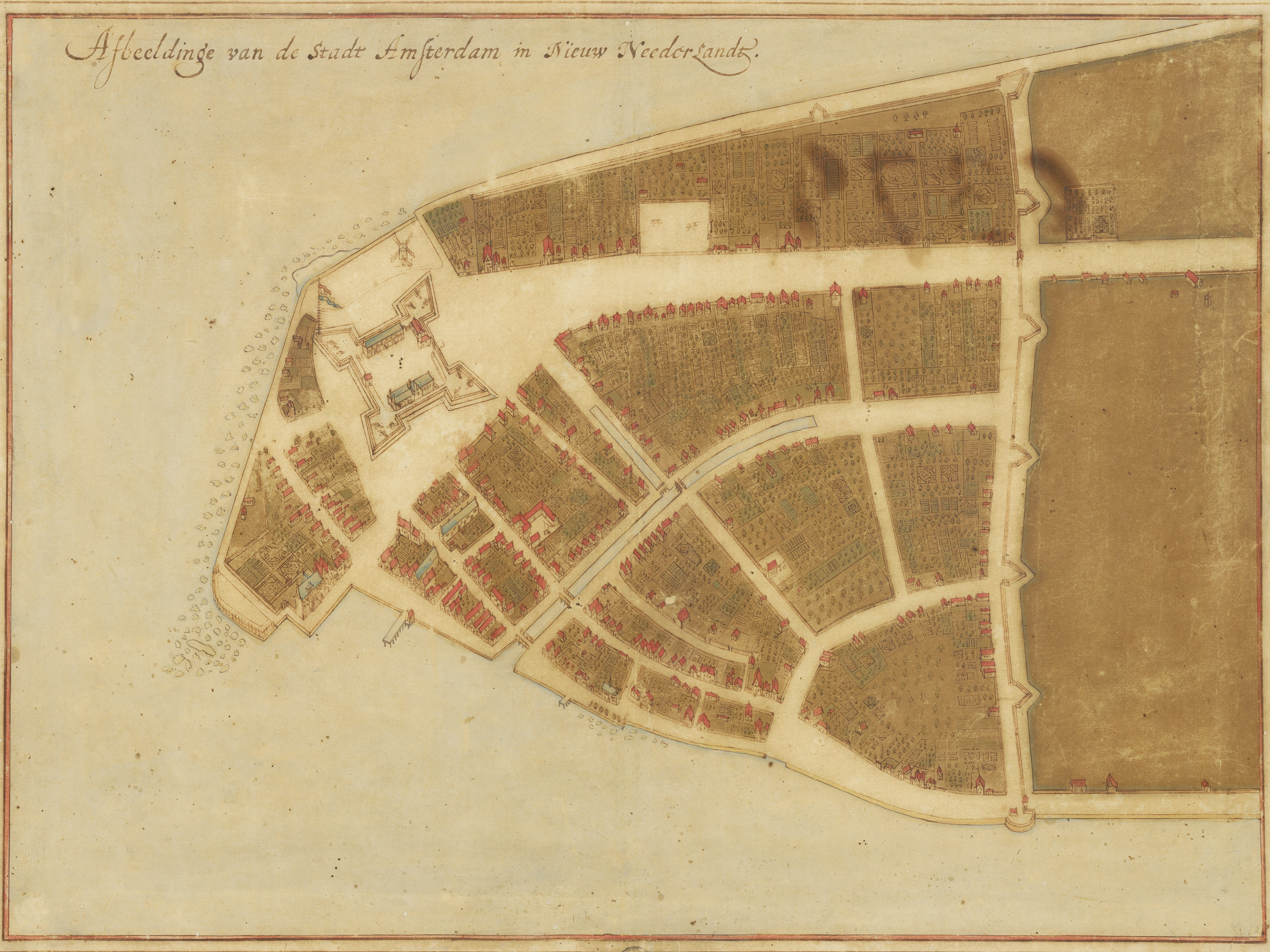
A 1660 map of New Amsterdam, later New York City. The city wall (right) gave Wall Street its name.

- Boston, Massachusetts, maintained a defensive city wall and gate across Boston Neck, the sole point where the city was connected with the mainland, from 1631 until the end of the 18th century.
- Charleston, South Carolina was a walled city from the 1690s until the 1720s. A portion of the wall, called Half Moon Battery, is still visible in the Provost Dungeon of the Old Exchange Building.
- St. Augustine, Florida, starting in 1704, the Spanish constructed the Cubo Line – attached to the Castillo de San Marcos and enclosing the city. 18th century maps detail the walls enclosing all of St. Augustine
- New Orleans, planned in 1718 as a walled city. The wall was present during the Battle of New Orleans, but was found to be in such a state of disarray that it could not be used.
- New York City, in the 17th century New Amsterdam had a defensive wall across Manhattan. Wall Street is named for the barrier.

=== Uruguay ===
- Montevideo
- Colonia del Sacramento

== Asia ==
=== Afghanistan ===
- Balkh, the ancient city

=== China ===
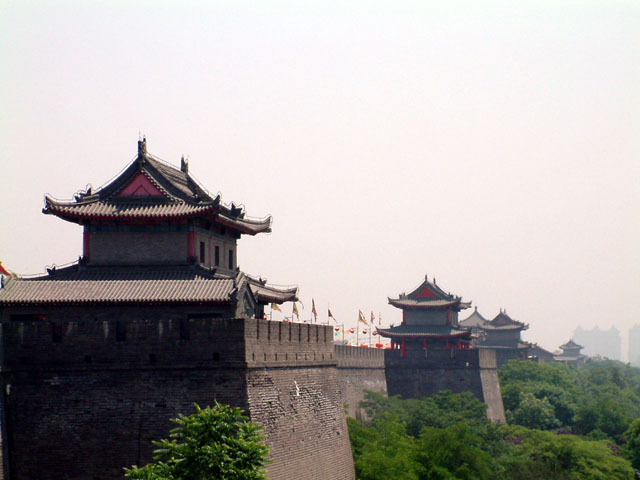
Watch towers on the citywall in Xi'an, China

- Beijing, see City Wall of Beijing. Many parts of the walls of Beijing were demolished during the 1960s to open large streets around the city. A metro line also follows the location of the former city walls.
- Xiangyang
- Guangzhou
- Dali
- Shangqiu
- Jianshui
- Zhangjiakou, see Wanquan District
- Zhaoqing
- Guangfu Ancient City
- Xingcheng
- Liaocheng
- Kaifeng
- Qiansuo in Huludao
- Datong
- Daming County
- Yongtai Fortress
- Jingzhou
- Kowloon Walled City, a former enclave of Hong Kong
- Nanjing, see City Wall of Nanjing
- Linhai
- Qufu
- Taiyuan, see Jinyuan District
- Pingyao
- Shanghai (Old City (Shanghai)) – largely destroyed in 1912, only fragments survive
- Songpan
- Xi'an – The city of Xi'an has well-preserved walls with a water filled moat that is a tourist attraction incorporating small parks surrounding a busy and modern area of the city.
- Zhengding
- Yuanzhou District in Guyuan
- Walled villages can still be found in Mainland China and Hong Kong.

=== India ===
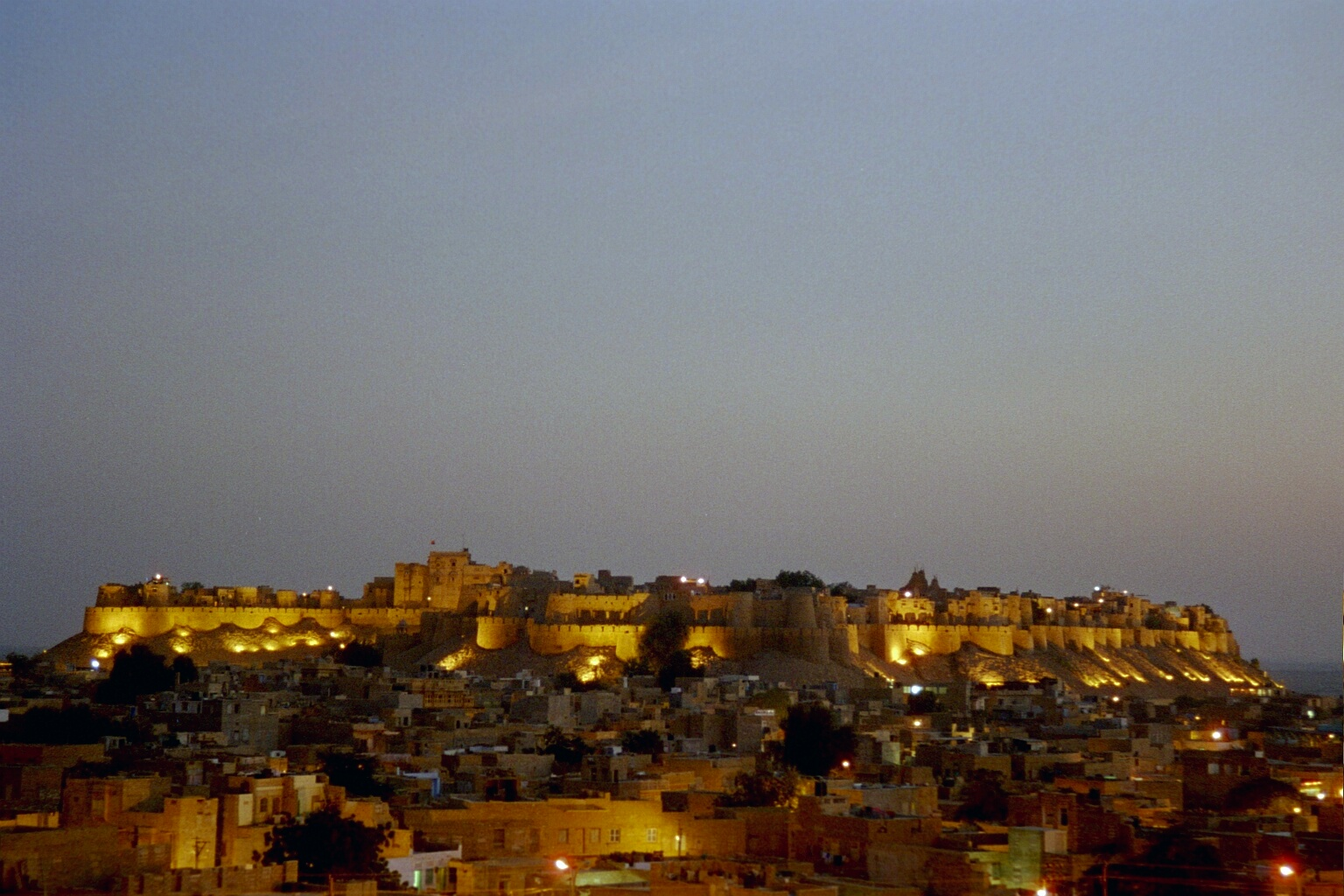
12th century Jaisalmer Fortress City from northern approaches at dusk, in Jaisalmer, Rajestan, India. A World Heritage site.

- Agra
- Ahmedabad
- Amravati
- Amritsar
- Datia
- Delhi
- Hyderabad
- Jaipur
- Jaisalmer
- Jodhpur
- Lucknow
- Mumbai (old city of Bombay)
- Raigad
- Udaipur
- Warangal
- Chennai
- Mhow
- Badami
- Aihole
- Kanchipuram
- Madurai
- Belur
- Halebidu
- Tiruvannamalai
- Srirangapatnam
- Kolhapur
- Surat
- Baroda
- Surat
- Indore
- Gwalior
- Gauda
- Murshidabad
- Karnasubarna
- Nabadwip
- Tamralipti
- Bhubaneshwar
- Puri
- Khajuraho
- Varanasi
- Jhansi
- Faizabad
- Gaya
- Patliputra
- Kangra
- Charaideo
- Jammu
- Ludhiana
- Patiala
- Sirhind
- Champawat
- Pithoragarh
- Bilaspur
- Shimla

=== Indonesia ===
- Bogor

Pakuan Pajajaran, the capital of the Sunda Kingdom, was surrounded by defensive moats and walls. Now the area is part of the modern city of Bogor.

- Jogjakarta

An 18th century wall made by Hamengkubuwono the 1st from the Ngayogyakarta Hadiningrat Kingdom to protect the inner capital city from the Dutch and other enemies during the Mataram Kingdom period.

- Surakarta

On 17 February 1745, the Surakarta Kingdom moved to a new opened forest named Sala Village and build their Royal Residential Palace and urban area with a 15 kilometers long of "Beteng Kraton" or Palace wall around it.

- Surosowan

Well known as Banten Kingdom's capital. The wall was destroyed by the Dutch during its colonial period in the way to ended the Banten reign. The city wall that left is only about 10% from the real appearance.

- Trowulan

Trowulan was the capital of the former Majapahit Empire. When its glory period, the capital being a first European systemized ancient city (with city canal system for transportation and also large aisle and road for major transportation) in Indonesia, because Trowulan was developed in Majapahit's glory period in 13th–15th century. The wall was protecting the inner "Kraton" or royal palace and some important places. Today the wall can't be seen as the original appearance.

=== Iran ===
- Bam
- Isfahan
- Shiraz
- Tabriz
- Yazd

=== Iraq ===
- Babylon
- Baghdad
- Basra
- Arbil (central city, fully intact)

=== Israel ===
- Acre – 18th-century modern Ottoman fortification able to withstand cannon attack. The wall has been restored and now includes a rampart for tourists.
- Jaffa
- Jerusalem
- Safed
- Tel Erani
- Tiberias

=== Lebanon ===
- Baalbek: sections of the Arab fortifications (built with stones from Roman structures) can still be seen around the Acropolis and the old town
- Batroun: the town is known for its 225 m long Phoenician seawall. There was also a 9th-century BC citadel, parts of which are still visible
- Beirut: sections of the Phoenician and Roman fortifications and Ottoman citadel have been unearthed in the city's central district. The famous walls erected by Emir Fakhruddin II have yet to be recovered.
- Byblos: the old town is surrounded by medieval walls, with a castle standing at their Southern edge
- Sidon: little remains today of the city's medieval fortifications, except the Castle of St. Louis.

=== Malaysia ===
- Malacca – Built by the Portuguese after the city's occupation in 1511, it was torn down by the British in 1806. Known locally as the A Famosa.

=== Pakistan ===
Almost every old city in Pakistan had a defensive wall. Much of these walls were destroyed by the British in order to refortify the cities. Few cities which were fortified are:

- Hyderabad
- Lahore
- Multan
- Peshawar
- Shikarpur
- Hazro
- Quetta
- Sialkot
- Rawalpindi
- Gujrat
- Gujranwala
- Bhera
- Khudabad
- Bannu
- Tulamba
- Uch Sharif
- Sehwan Sharif
- Thatta
- Karachi
- Rohri
- Mansura
- Bela

=== Palestine ===
- Anthedon
- Ancient Jericho
- Jerusalem
- Nablus
- Tell Ruqeish
- Tell es-Sakan

=== Philippines ===
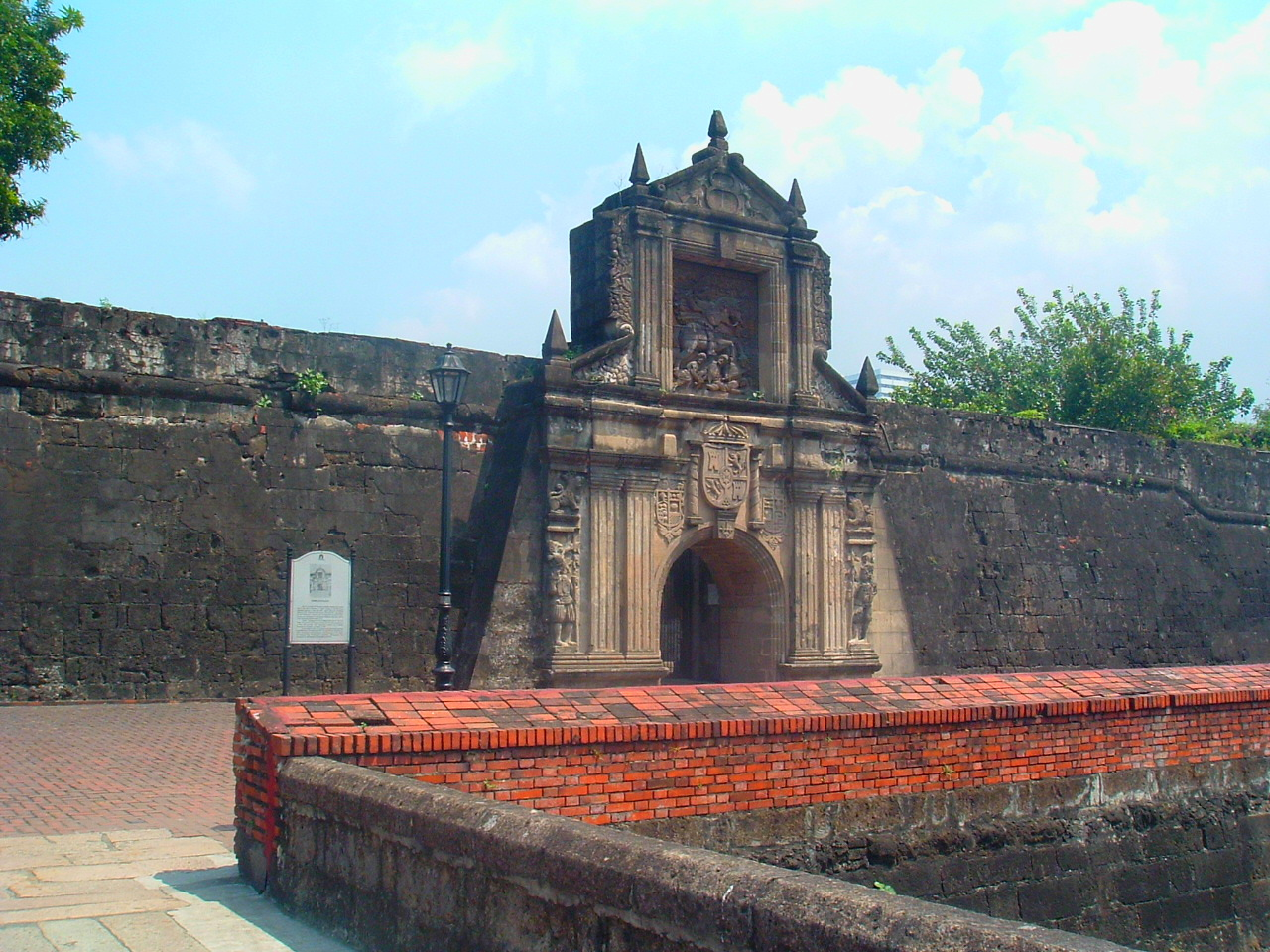
The walled city of Intramuros in Manila

- Cebu (see Fort San Pedro)
- Manila (Intramuros) – partially preserved, partially restored after World War II. Original walls are still well preserved.
- Olongapo ("Spanish Gate")
- Ozamiz (Fuerte de la Concepción y del Triunfo)
- Zamboanga (see Fort Pilar)

=== South Korea ===
- Dongnae (now part of Busan) (See Dongnaeeupseong)
- Seoul (See Fortress Wall of Seoul)
- Suwon (See Hwaseong Fortress)
- Gwangju, Gyeonggi (See Namhansanseong)
- Goyang (See Bukhansanseong)

=== Sri Lanka ===
- Galle (See Galle Fort.)
- Matara (See Matara Fort.)

=== Syria ===
- Aleppo
- Damascus
- Homs

=== Taiwan ===
- Changhua
- Chiayi
- Fongshan (now part of Kaohsiung)
- Hengchun (see Hengchun Old Town)
- Hsinchu
- Magong
- Puli
- Quemoy
- Tainan
- Taipei (see Walls of Taipei)
- Zuoying (now part of Kaohsiung, see Old City of Zuoying)

Some other towns were fortified with thorny bamboo in the Qing era.

=== Thailand ===
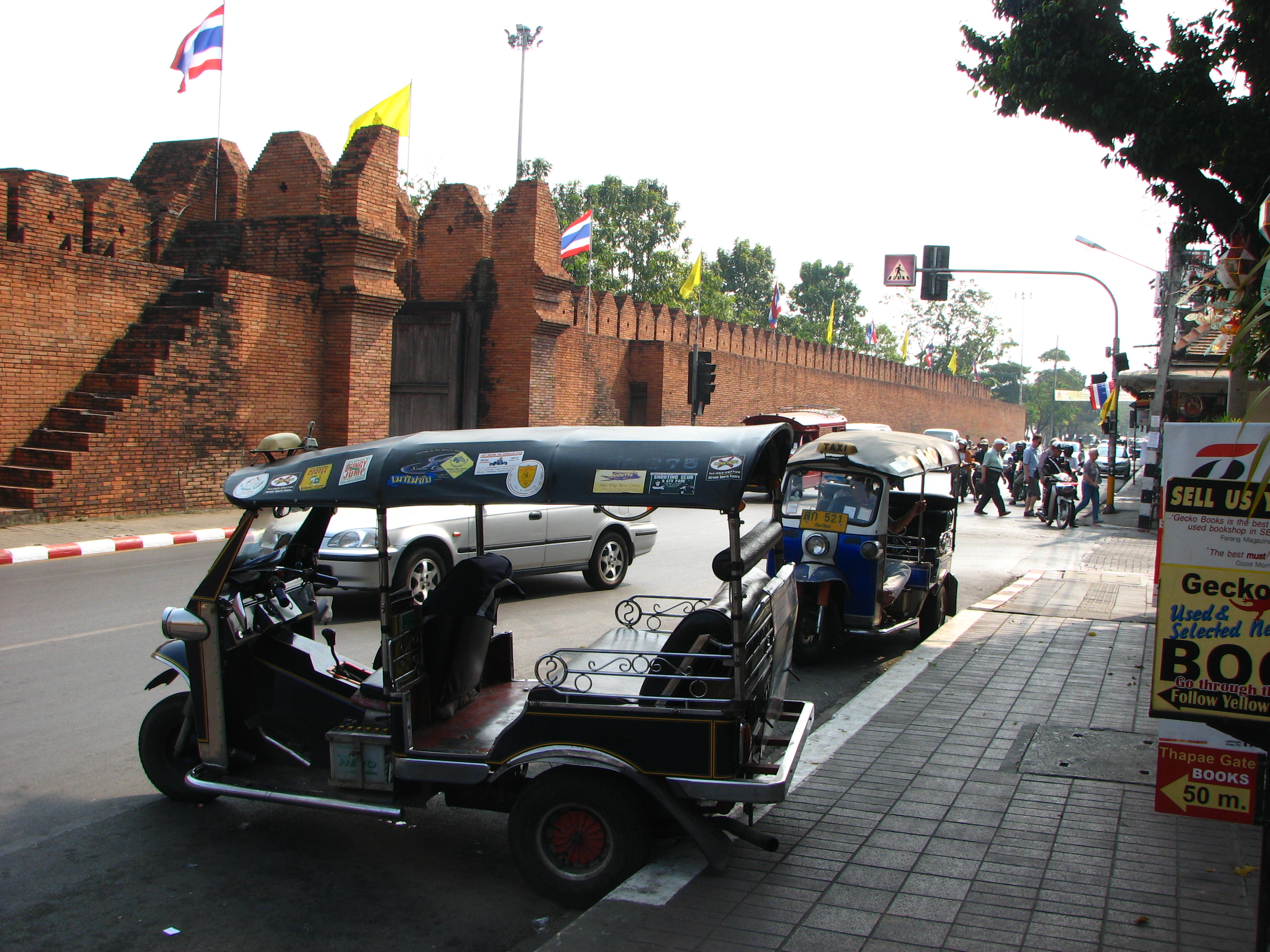
Tapae Gate in the eastern wall surrounding the old city of Chiang Mai.

- Ayutthaya
- Bangkok – See Fortifications of Bangkok
- Chiang Mai was surrounded by a moat and city walls when it was established by King Mangrai the Great in 1296. They were extensively rebuilt in the early 19th century. Large parts of the city walls and city gates of Chiang Mai survived till the present.
- Chiang Rai
- Chiang Saen
- Kamphaeng Phet
- Lampang
- Lamphun
- Lopburi
- Nakhon Ratchasima
- Nakhon Si Thammarat
- Nan, Thailand
- Phichai
- Phayao
- Phimai
- Phitsanulok
- Phrae
- Si Satchanalai
- Songkhla
- Sukhothai
- Suphanburi
- Thonburi
- Wiang Kum Kam

=== Uzbekistan ===
- Bukhara
- Khiva
- Samarkand
- Shahrisabz

=== Vietnam ===
- Cổ Loa
- Hanoi
- Huế
- Bắc Ninh
- Vinh
- Thanh Hóa
- Quảng Trị
- Nam Định
- Mạc citadel
- Sơn Tây citadel

=== Yemen ===
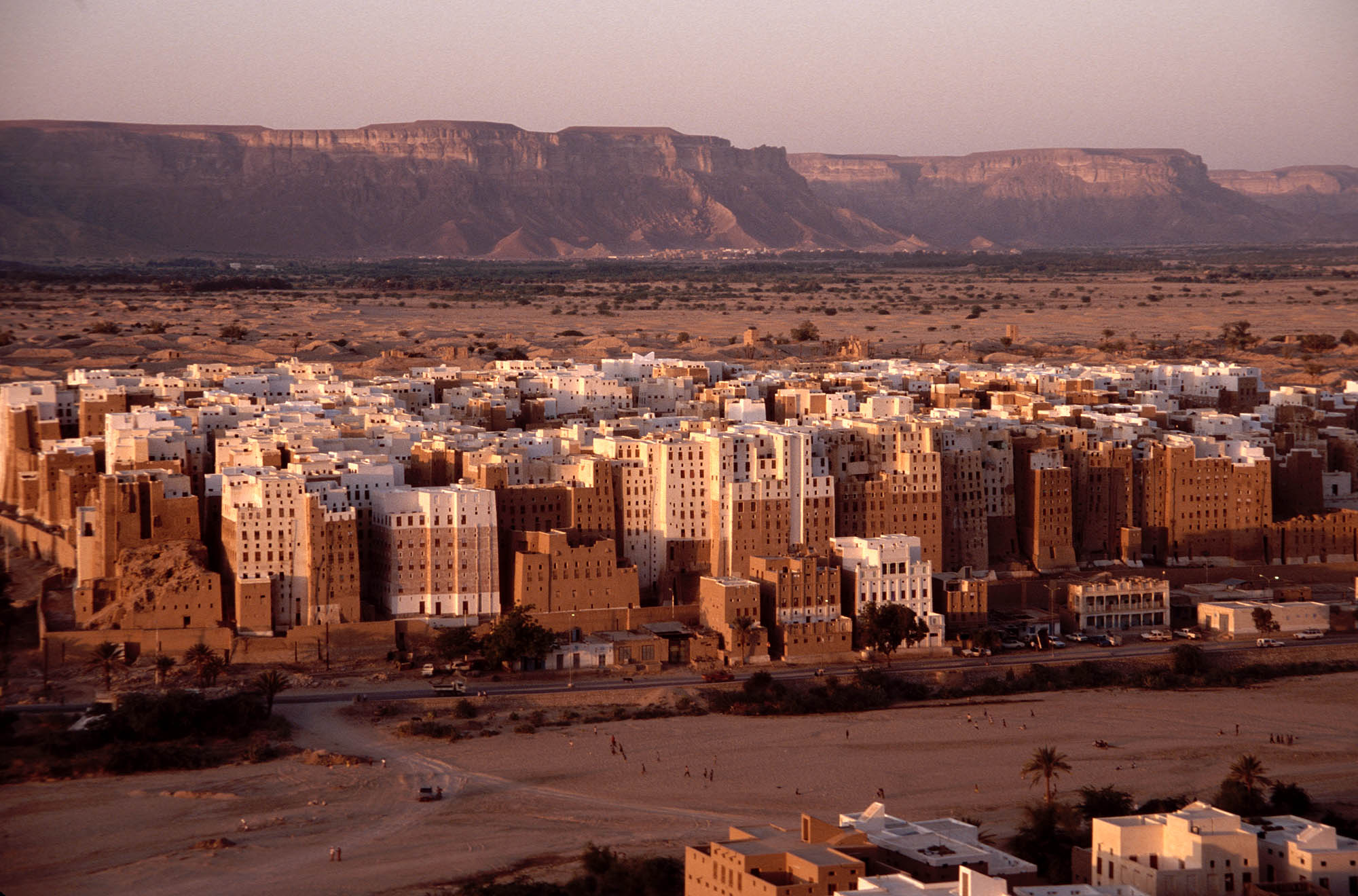
Surrounded by a fortified wall, the 16th-century city of Shibam, Yemen

- Sanaa
- Shibam

== Europe ==
=== Albania ===
- Berat
- Butrint
- Durrës
- Elbasan – sizable remains of Roman walls
- Krujë
- Tepelenë

=== Austria ===
- Allentsteig
- Amstetten Not walled but ditched and banked with gate towers.
- Bleiburg
- Bludenz
- Braunau am Inn
- Bregenz
- Bruck an der Leitha – partially preserved
- Bruck an der Mur
- Donnerskirchen.
- Drosendorf
- Dürnstein
- Ebenfurth
- Eferding
- Eggenburg
- Eisenstadt
- Enns
- Fehring
- Feldkirch
- Friedberg
- Freistadt – almost completely preserved
- Friesach
- Frohnleiten
- Fürstenfeld
- Gmünd
- Gmuend-in-Kaernten
- Gmunden
- Graz
- Gross-Enzersdorf
- Güssing
- Hainburg an der Donau – almost completely preserved (2.5 km, 3 gates, 15 towers)
- Hallein
- Hall in Tirol – partially preserved
- Hardegg
- Hartberg
- Haslach an der Muhl
- Heidenreichstein
- Herzogenburg
- Horn
- Judenburg
- Kitzbühel
- Klagenfurt
- Klosterneuburg
- Knittelfeld
- Korneuburg
- Krems
- Kufstein
- Laa an der Thaya
- Leoben
- Leonfelden
- Leoben
- Lienz
- Linz
- Litschau
- Maissau
- Marchegg – some segments preserved
- Mautern – remains of the Roman fortress "Favianae" can be found at the western side of the old town.
- Melk
- Murau
- Mürzzuschlag
- Neumarkt am Wallersee
- Neumarkt
- Obdach
- Oberwölz
- Oggau am Neusiedler See
- Ottensheim
- Peuerbach
- Pöchlarn
- Purbach am Neusiedler See
- Raabs an der Thaya
- Radfeld
- Radkersburg
- Radstadt – almost completely preserved wall (13th- to 16th-century); 3 round towers (1530s); 1 gate
- Rattenberg
- Retz
- Ried im Innkreis
- Rottenmann
- Rust
- St Andrä
- Sankt Veit an der Glan
- St Pölten
- Salzburg
- Schärding
- Scheibbs
- Schladming
- Schrattenthal
- Schwanenstadt the settlement surrounded by a bank, surmounted by wooden palisade, with only a short length of wall adjacent to the Stadtturm.
- Stadtschlaining
- Stainach
- Stein
- Straßburg
- Steyr
- Steyregg
- Traismauer
- Tulln an der Donau
- Vienna – destroyed and became the Ringstraße
- Villach
- Vils
- Vöcklabruck
- Völkermarkt
- Voitsberg
- Waidhofen an der Thaya
- Waidhofen an der Ybbs
- Weitra
- Wels
- Wiener Neustadt
- Wilhelmsburg
- Wolfsberg
- Ybbs an der Donau
- Zeiselmauer. The Roman auxiliary fort was re-fortified by the Babenbergs in the 10th century, but never granted a market or charter.
- Zistersdorf
- Zwettl

=== Azerbaijan ===
- Baku retains most of the city walls that separate the historic Inner City from the newer parts of the city developed after the 19th century.
- Shaki
- Shusha

=== Belgium ===
Place	Province	Accessible	Condition	Image	Notes
Aarschot	Flemish Brabant	Yes	One or more individual structures (Bastions, gates towers, etc.) remain.		The most significant remain of the medieval fortifications which surrounded the town of Aarschot is a tower located on top of a hill just south of the old town, named the Aurelianustoren or Orleanstoren.
Ath	Hainaut	Yes	One or more individual structures (Bastions, gates, towers, etc.) remain.		Ath was fortified several times. Of the oldest fortifications, the old castle, including the Burbant Tower, still stands. The bendy course of some of the streets surrounding the old town are vestiges of the bastioned ramparts of the post-medieval era. Some remnants of these fortifications still remain to the north of the old town, near the Boulevard Alphonse Deneubourg.
Arlon	Luxembourg	Yes	One or more individual structures (Bastions, gates, towers, etc.) remain.		A smallish citadel stands in the center of the old town, on the location of a destroyed medieval castle.
Beaumont	Hainaut	Yes	One or more individual structures (Bastions, gates, towers, etc.) remain.		A sizable stretch of the old city wall remains to the east of the old town. The most notable part is the old Tour Salamandre, an old keep tower.
Binche	Hainaut	Yes	Sizable parts of the fortifications remain intact.		The city of Binche sports the most intact set of city walls of Belgium. Built in 1230 AD, they are 2.1 kilometers long and sport about 30 towers. There were six gates, but these have been demolished in the 19th century.
Bouillon	Luxembourg	Yes	One or more individual structures (Bastions, gates, towers, etc.) remain.		Apart from the impressive medieval castle, three small, tower-like bastions, as well as several small stretches of curtain wall, remain of the wall built around the town by the French military engineer Vauban in the 17th century.
Bruges	Western Flanders	Yes	One or more individual structures (Bastions, gates, towers, etc.) remain.		Out of the nine gates in the 14th-century walls, four survive today. Several stretches of the earth fortification wall surrounding the city are still in place. Apart from a single tower, no trace remains of the stone wall that topped some parts of the earth ramparts. A single tower of the first city wall can be seen across the canal at the Pottenmakersstraat.
Brussels	Brussels-Capital Region		One or more individual structures (Bastions, gates, towers, etc.) remain.		Of the first city wall, built in the 13th century, a small stretch of curtain wall and several isolated towers still remain. Of the second wall, only the Halle gate remains. The inner ring road of Brussels now occupies the location of this second wall.
Chièvres	Hainaut	Yes	One or more individual structures (Bastions, gates, towers, etc.) remain.		A large stretch of the medieval town walls still remains behind the church of St. Martin and the chapel of Our Lady (Notre Dame) and the houses alongside the Rue Hoche. A wall tower, the Tour de Gavre, also remains next to the church.
Chimay	Hainaut		One or more individual structures (Bastions, gates, towers, etc.) remain.		An isolated tower still remains at the Rue de Noailles
Dalhem	Wallonia		One or more individual structures (Bastions, gates, towers, etc.) remain.		Several remains of the town and castle's fortifications can be found at the back of the houses alongside Rue du Général Thys. The ruins of the castle are also located on Rue du Général Thys.
Damme	West Flanders	Yes	One or more individual structures (Bastions, gates, towers, etc.) remain.		The location of the 16th-century, seven-sided ring of fortifications can still be seen as low hills in the fields and gardens surrounding the old town. A small portion of the inner and outer wall was reconstructed in 2001.
Dendermonde	East Flanders	Yes	One or more individual structures (Bastions, gates, towers, etc.) remain.		Dendermonde received a new set of city walls in the 19th century, being an important part of the Wellington Barrier. Currently, various structures, including the arsenal, barracks, two gates, and several parts of the walls (transformed into a park) remain.
Diest	Flemish Brabant	Yes	Sizable parts of the fortifications remain intact.		To the north of the city centre, one can still find two polygonous fronts featuring a land gate; a water gate and a ravelin. An outer wall in front of this wall fragment sports two dilapidated casemated caponieres. To the east, the shape of several bastions have remained intact. An outer work, to the east of the fortifications, is incorporated in a swimming pool complex. The Citadel remains mostly intact, although the side facing the city was demolished to make room for barracks. There is a small fortress to the north of the city center.
Herentals	Antwerpen		One or more individual structures (Bastions, gates, towers, etc.) remain.		Two, much altered, gates of the medieval fortifications of the town of Herentals can still be found at either end of the town center.
Huy	Liège		Sizable parts of the fortifications remain intact.		Sizable portions of the medieval city wall can be found to the south and east of the old town. During the early 19th century, a large fortress was built by the Dutch on the location where a castle had stood several centuries before.
Kortrijk	Western Flanders		One or more individual structures (Bastions, gates, towers, etc.) remain.		The extensive fortifications of Courtrai have been demolished during the mid-18th century. The only remains are the Medieval Broel towers, standing on either side of the river Lys. A foundation of a defensive wall and a multi angular artillery tower, both situated adjacent to the church of Our Lady, form the last remnants of the first castle of Courtrai.
Leuven	Flemish Brabant		One or more individual structures (Bastions, gates, towers, etc.) remain.		Several dilapidated towers and fragments of the Romanesque 12th-century first wall of Leuven can be found throughout the city centre, although a sizeable portion collapsed due to negligence in February, 2011. Of the second wall, only the ground floor of a watchtower and the base of a watergate over the Dijle river still stand. The second wall was changed into a park in the 19th century, this park was largely destroyed and replaced by a ring road in the 20th century.
Liège	Liège		One or more individual structures (Bastions, gates, towers, etc.) remain.		Several towers and fragments of the medieval city wall remain on the slopes to the north of the old town. The south side of the citadel, featuring three bastions and two ravelins, remains intact. The rest of the citadel was demolished and now the site houses a large hospital. A ring of detached fortresses still encloses the city. In the 19th century, the Dutch constructed large fortress the Chartreuse heights to the east of the city. Although the eastern bastions have been demolished, most of this fortress still stands, be it in a ruinous state after having been neglected since the 1980s
Limbourg	Liège		Sizable parts of the fortifications remain intact.		Although partially demolished, sizable remnants of the city wall can still be seen, surrounding the upper town of Limbourg. The best preserved stretches are located on the eastern side of the old town.
Lo-Reninge	West Flanders		One or more individual structures (Bastions, gates, towers, etc.) remain.		Only the Westpoort, built around 1250 CE, and consisting of two small towers connected by an arch, remains.
Middelburg	West Flanders		Vestiges of the fortifications are visible in the landscape.		Nothing remains above ground of the earth bastions that surrounded this tiny village (which should not be confused with its nearby, much larger Dutch namesake), but the location and course of the defences can still be recognized from air.
Mechelen	Antwerpen		One or more individual structures (Bastions, gates, towers, etc.) remain.		Only the Brusselsepoort (Brussels Gate) remains of the old fortifications of Mechelen.
Menen	West Flanders	Yes	One or more individual structures (Bastions, gates, towers, etc.) remain.		Several fragments of the bastioned trace, first built by the French in the 17th century, but extensively rebuilt by the Dutch, remain. Two bastions are still remaining near the Sluizenkaai and Zwemkomstraat, though heavily built by houses. The casemates of one of the bastions remain intact and can be visited.
Mons	Hainaut		One or more individual structures (Bastions, gates, towers, etc.) remain.		Several fragments of the first city wall of mons have been preserved. Of the later defences, only two bastion-like structures remain to the south of the city centre, but the location of the fortifications can still be seen in the zig-zagging street pattern on the east side of the city.
Namur	Namur	Yes	One or more individual structures (Bastions, gates, towers, etc.) remain.		Of the defences of the city itself, the enormous arsenal building is the most notable remnant. Some remnants of the bastioned defences may be found in the Parc Louise Marie, as well as at the foot of the citadel. Only small fragments remain of the medieval city wall, most notably a strong round tower, now incorporated into the town hall as the city's belfry. The mighty citadel that grew out of the medieval count's castle, remains mostly intact and can be visited.
Ninove	East Flanders		One or more individual structures (Bastions, gates, towers, etc.) remain.		Only the Koepoort (Cow Gate) remains of the old walls of the town of Ninove.
Ostend	West Flanders		One or more individual structures (Bastions, gates, towers, etc.) remain.		A portion of the bastioned city wall remains to the south of the town center, transformed into a park. East of the harbor stands an old advanced fortification, known as the Halve Maan (Crescent Moon). A short distance further to the east stands the 19th-century Fort Napoleon, now a museum.
Philippeville	Namur	Yes	Vestiges of the fortifications are visible in the landscape.		Although the walls themselves were demolished in 1860, an extensive system of 17th-century underground passages remain. A portion of these fortifications is open to the public.
Thuin	Hainaut		One or more individual structures (Bastions, gates, towers, etc.) remain.		Several towers and fragments of wall remain around the old fortress town of Thuin, most notably to the south of the old town, above the Hanging Gardens.
Tongeren	Limburg	Yes	One or more individual structures (Bastions, gates, towers, etc.) remain.		Important parts of the 13th-century wall, including several towers and a gate, remain. Outside the medieval town, one can still find remnants of the first Roman wall, which enclosed a much larger area than the medieval wall. Of the much smaller second Roman wall, no above-ground remnants remain.
Tournai	Hainaut		One or more individual structures (Bastions, gates, towers, etc.) remain.		Remnants of fortifications can be found scattered throughout the old town. Of the first fortifications, several towers and a gate remain. Of the second medieval wall, a sizable portion remains to the south-east of the old city, while the Pont des Trous, although severely altered, remains an impressive example of a medieval water gate. A large round tower is all that remains from the fortress built by English king Henry VIII. Of the citadel, only the interior buildings remain, as well as several underground passages which ran underneath the bastions of the fortress.
Veurne	West Flanders		Vestiges of the fortifications are visible in the landscape.		The bendy route of the canal as well as the street plan around the city centre clearly indicate the location of the earthen bastions that used to surround the city.
Ypres	West Flanders	Yes	Sizable parts of the fortifications remain intact.		A wall with 3 unusually flat bastions defends the east side of the city. To the south a medieval gate and the lower portions of two medieval towers can be found. Both towers are defended by a ravelin. A park to the east of the city houses a number of underground passages belonging to outworks built by the Dutch.
Zandvliet	Antwerp		Vestiges of the fortifications are visible in the landscape.		The "Conterscherp" road follows the route of the former 17th-century defences around the city, giving the town centre a star shaped appearance from the air.
Zichem	Flemish Brabant		One or more individual structures (Bastions, gates, towers, etc.) remain.		The Maagdentoren (Maiden Tower) is what remains of the medieval town walls. A ring road indicates the trace of the now demolished fortifications.
Zoutleeuw	Flemish Brabant		One or more individual structures (Bastions, gates, towers, etc.) remain.		Remnants of the first 12th-century city wall and a gate can be found incorporated in the old city hall and the adjacent house. Outside the city, a bridge over the river Gete incorporates a partial reconstruction of a 14th-century watergate belonging to the second wall. To the south of the city, several low hills in the landscape indicate the position of a Spanish-built citadel. To the east of the old town stands the "Heksenkot", a tower of the old city wall.

=== Bosnia and Herzegovina ===
Place	Region	Accessible	Condition	Image	Notes
Kastel	Banja Luka	Yes	Presereved		
Bihać	Una-Sana Canton	Yes	Some edifices remain		
Bobovac	Central Bosnia Canton	Yes	Ruined, royal chapel restored		Medieval royal seat of Bosnian Kingdom
Daorson	Herzegovina-Neretva Canton	yes	Cyclopean walls remain	prehistoric fortified settlement	Built around a prehistoric central fortified settlement or acropolis (c. 17th-16th c. BCE – end of Bronze Age, c. 9th-8th c. BCE), surrounded by cyclopean walls (similar to Mycenae) dated to the 4th c. BCE.
Walled city of Jajce	Central Bosnia Canton	Yes	Good		
Walled town of Počitelj	Herzegovina-Neretva Canton	Yes	Good		
Walled town of Trebinje	Trebinje	Yes	Good		Walled town is part of the Stari Grad Trebinje
Walled town of Vidoški	Stolac	Yes	Preserved		
Walled city of Vratnik	Sarajevo Canton	Yes	Good		Vratnik is one of Sarajevo's oldest neighborhoods

=== Bulgaria ===
- Hisarya – the old Roman town is still almost entirely surrounded by the well preserved ruins of its defensive walls.

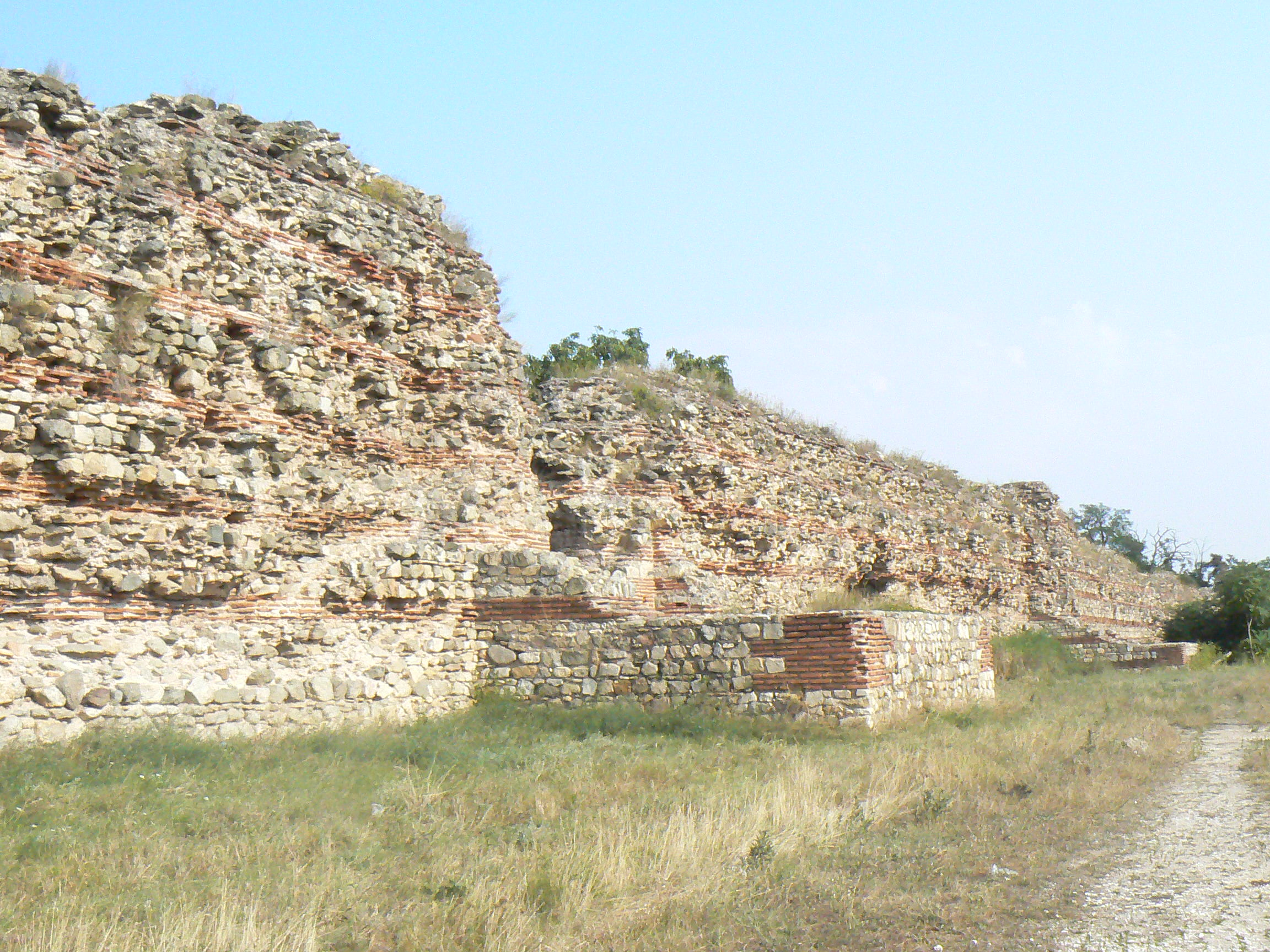
Roman walls of Hisarya

- Nessebar - fortified island city
- Nicopolis ad Istrum roman town, Nikyup, Veliko Tarnovo
- Nicopolis ad Nestum roman town, Garmen, Gotse Delchev, Blagoevgrad Province
- Novae roman town, Svishtov
- Pliska as first capital of Danubian Bulgaria
- Plovdiv fortifications and walls – Eastern gate of Philippopolis, Hisar Kapia and Nebet Tepe
- Preslav as capital of Bulgaria
- Silistra
- Sozopol
- Sofia – established as walled city Ulpia Serdica by the Roman emperor Trajan
- Varna
- Veliko Turnovo – three fortified hills – Trapezitsa fortress, Tsarevets fortress and Sveta Gora make one city capital of Bulgaria
- Vidin

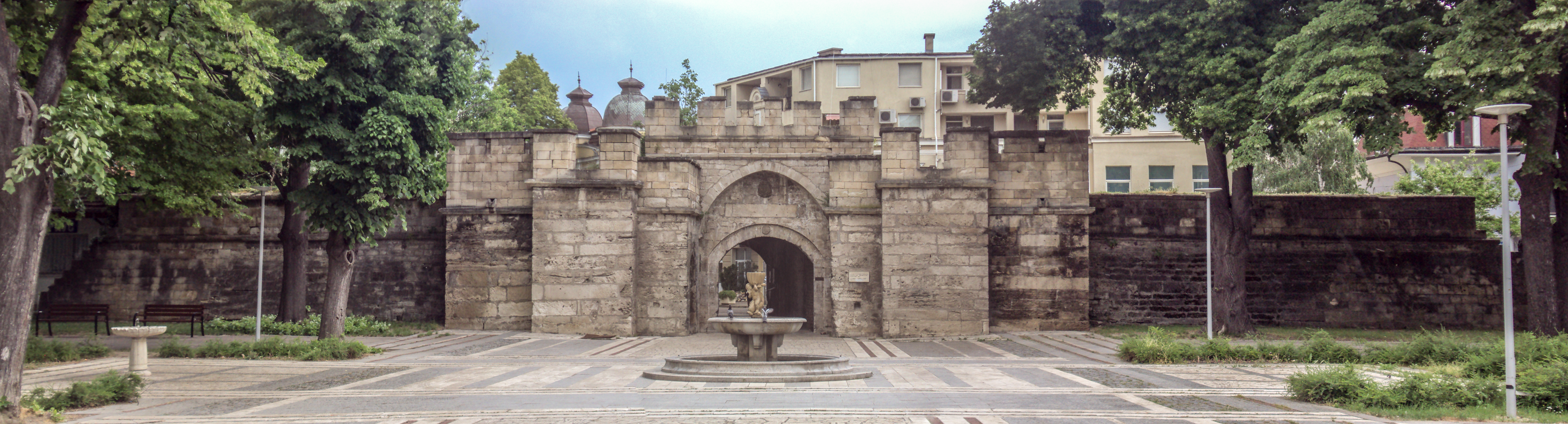
Vidin fortress

=== Croatia ===
Place	Province	Accessible	Condition	Image	Notes
Buje	Istria County				
Dubrovnik	Dubrovnik-Neretva County	yes	good		Dubrovnik has well-preserved city fortifications including towers, gate, rampart walk and two citadels guarding the docks. Walls of Dubrovnik are among the finest and most complete in Europe.
Diocletian's Palace	Split-Dalmatia County	yes	good		A good portion of the walls of Diocletian's Palace still survive to this day, including 3 gates and long stretches of the fortified defensive Roman walls. Most of the towers are now demolished, apart from 3 square towers, each of them located at a corner of the palace. North of the town center are the remains of a bastion trace, which includes portions of the walls and a bastion located in a park.
Grožnjan	Istria County				
Hvar	Split-Dalmatia County	yes	good		
Korčula	Dubrovnik-Neretva County	yes	good		City gate
Krk	Primorje-Gorski Kotar County	yes			Krk city walls which obtained their current appearance between the 12th and the 15th centuries but the town itself was fortified since Roman period.
Karlovac	Karlovac County				Karlovac city walls, built in 1579 as a six-point star with bastions.
Omišalj	Primorje-Gorski Kotar County				
Oprtalj	Istria County				
Motovun	Istria County	yes	good		
Nin	Zadar County	yes			
Novigrad	Zadar County				
Novigrad	Istria County				
Pag	Zadar County				
Poreč	Istria County	yes			
Primošten	Šibenik-Knin County				
Roč	Istria County				
Rovinj	Istria County	yes			
Senj	Lika-Senj County				City gate
Walls of Ston	Dubrovnik-Neretva County	yes	good		Fortification walls between Mali Ston and Ston were built in 14th and 15th centuries, at the isthmus of the Pelješac peninsula, to the north of Dubrovnik; 890 meters long town wall and 5 km Great Wall outside the town Ston.
Šibenik	Šibenik-Knin County	yes			
Trogir	Split-Dalmatia County	yes	good		City gate
Zadar	Zadar County	yes	good		Zadar retains about half of its wall.

=== Cyprus ===
Place	Condition	Image	Notes
Famagusta	Intact		Main article: Fortifications of Famagusta The first major fortification in Famagusta was the Othello Tower, which was built by the Lusignans in the 14th century and was later modified by the Venetians. The latter also built city walls in the 15th and 16th centuries, and they remain intact today.
Nicosia	Intact		Main article: Walls of Nicosia The first fortifications in Nicosia were built in the 13th and 14th century. The Venetians demolished the medieval fortifications and replaced them with a circular bastioned enceinte in the late 1560s. The walls remain largely intact except for some breaches.
Kyrenia	The remains include some stretches of wall, three towers and a town gate. The Castle is Intact.		The first major fortification in Kyrenia was the Kyrenia Castle, which was built by the Bizantin era. In the 14th century the Lusignans modified the Castle and also built the city walls. Most of the walls were demolished in 1570 after the surrender of the city to the Turks after the fall of Nicosia. Because Famagusta was still resisting, the Turks demolished much of the walls for fear of revolt or attack by the Venetians and the Great Christian Armada. They only kept the towers of the walls for better coverage and the castle.

=== Czech Republic ===
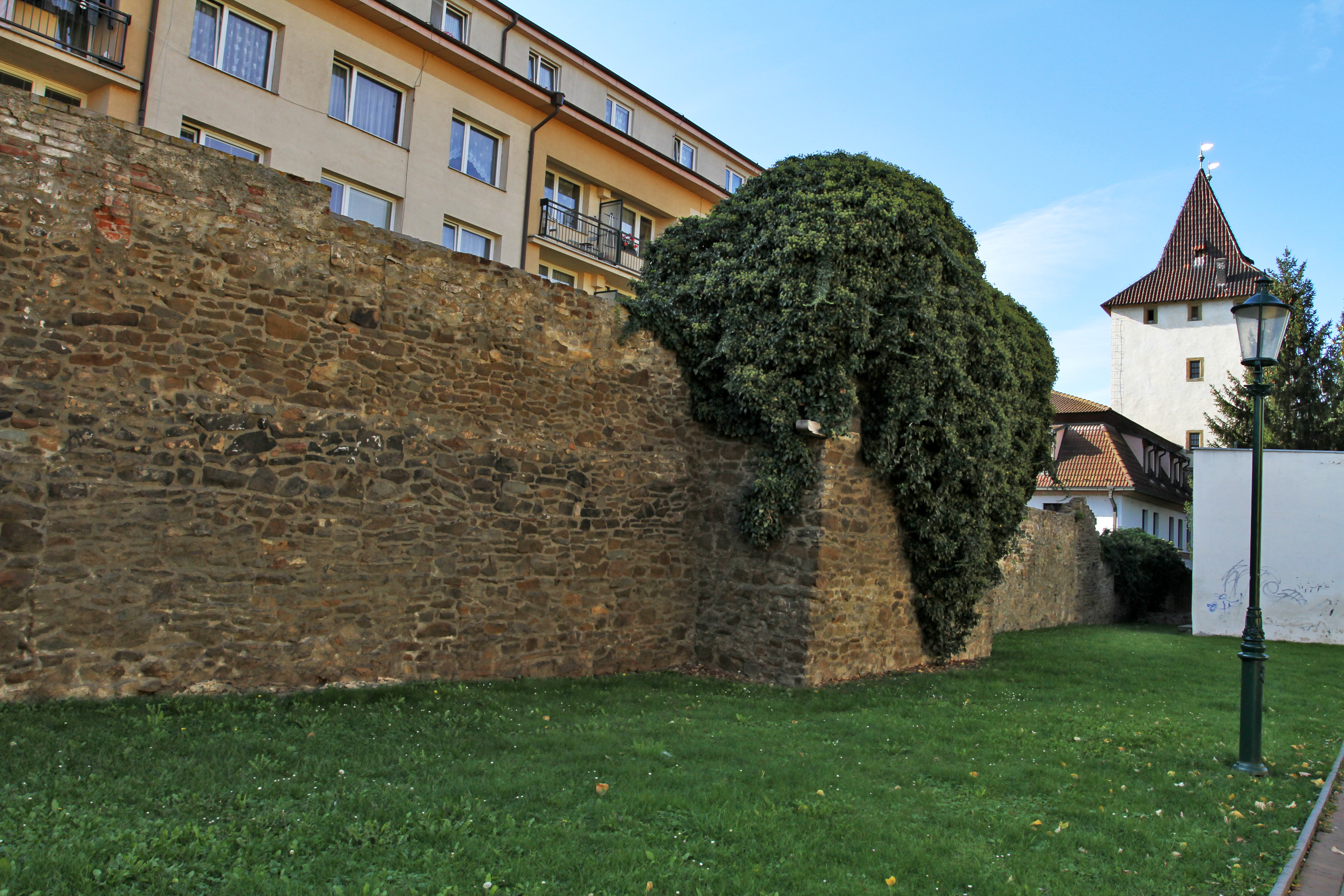
Town wall in Beroun

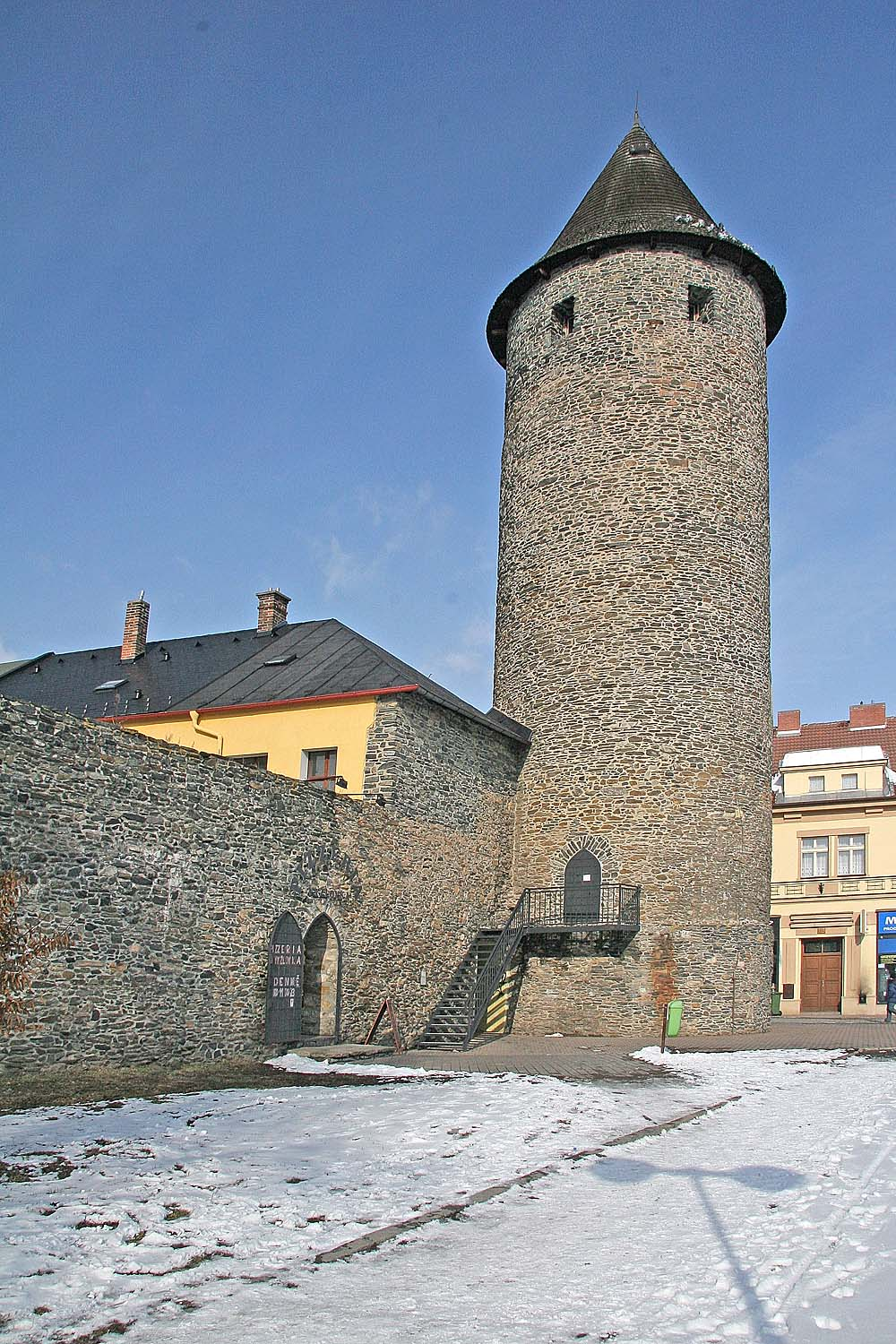
Wall and tower in Čáslav

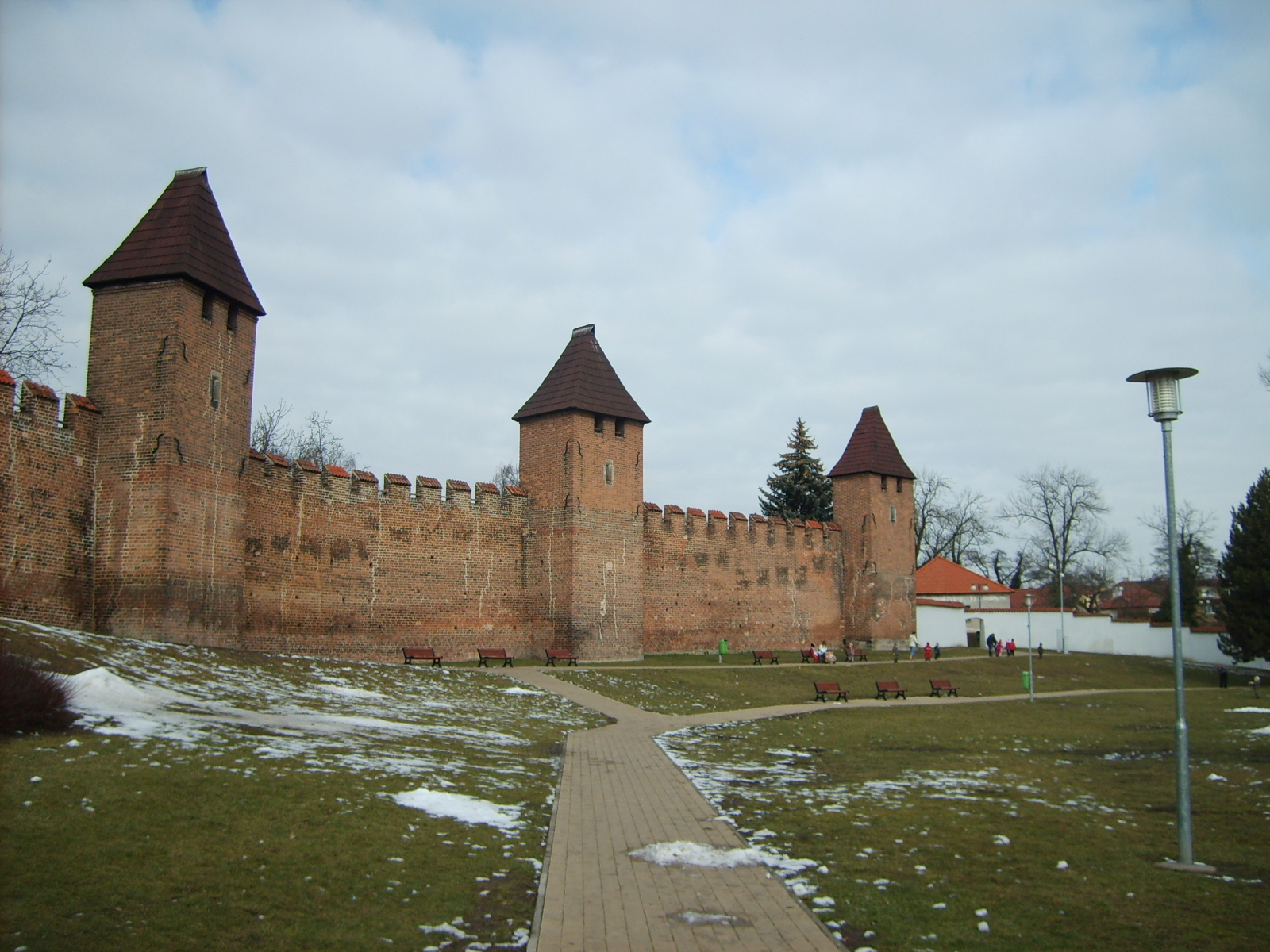
Nymburk walls

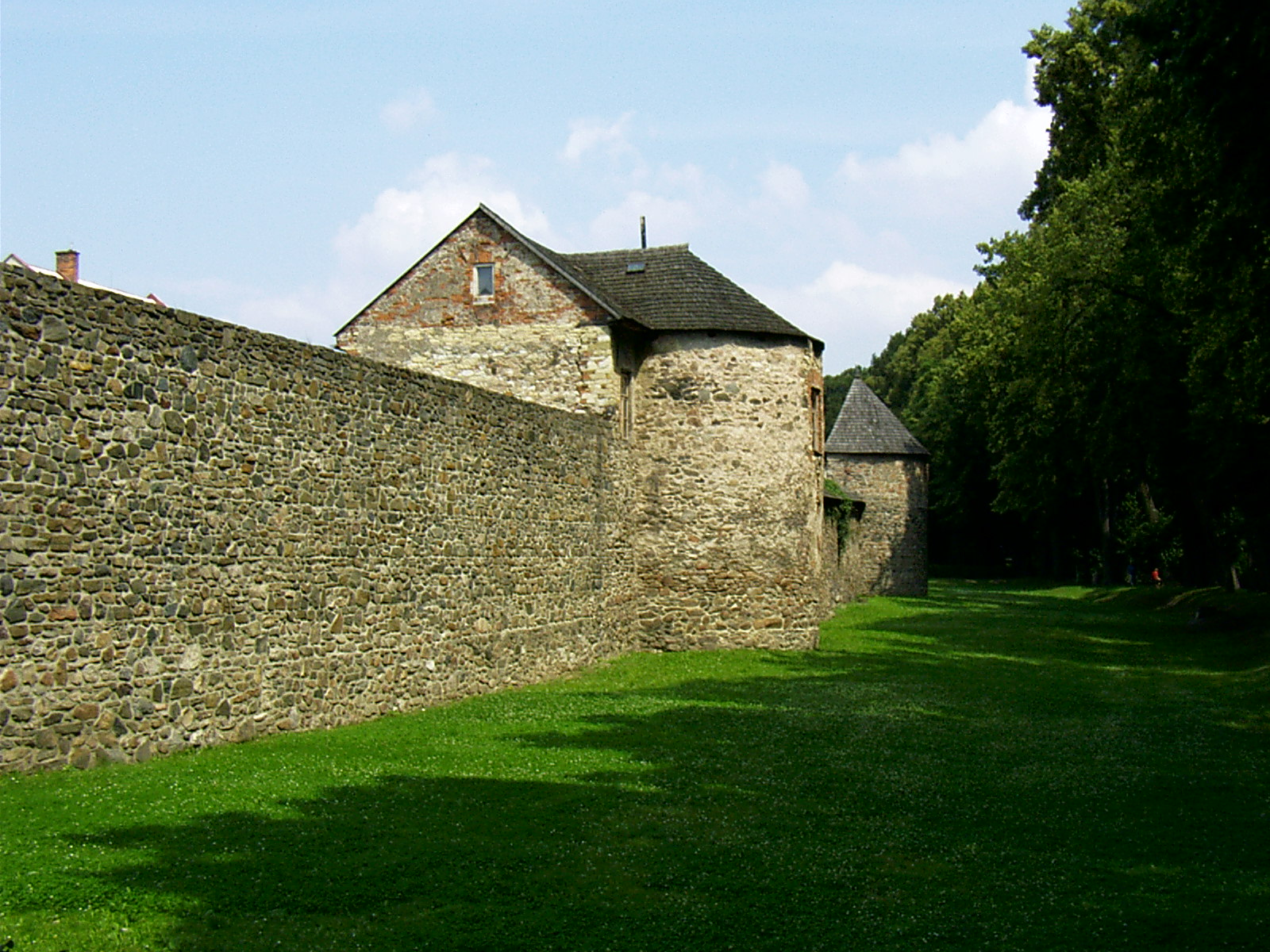
Wall and bastion in Polička

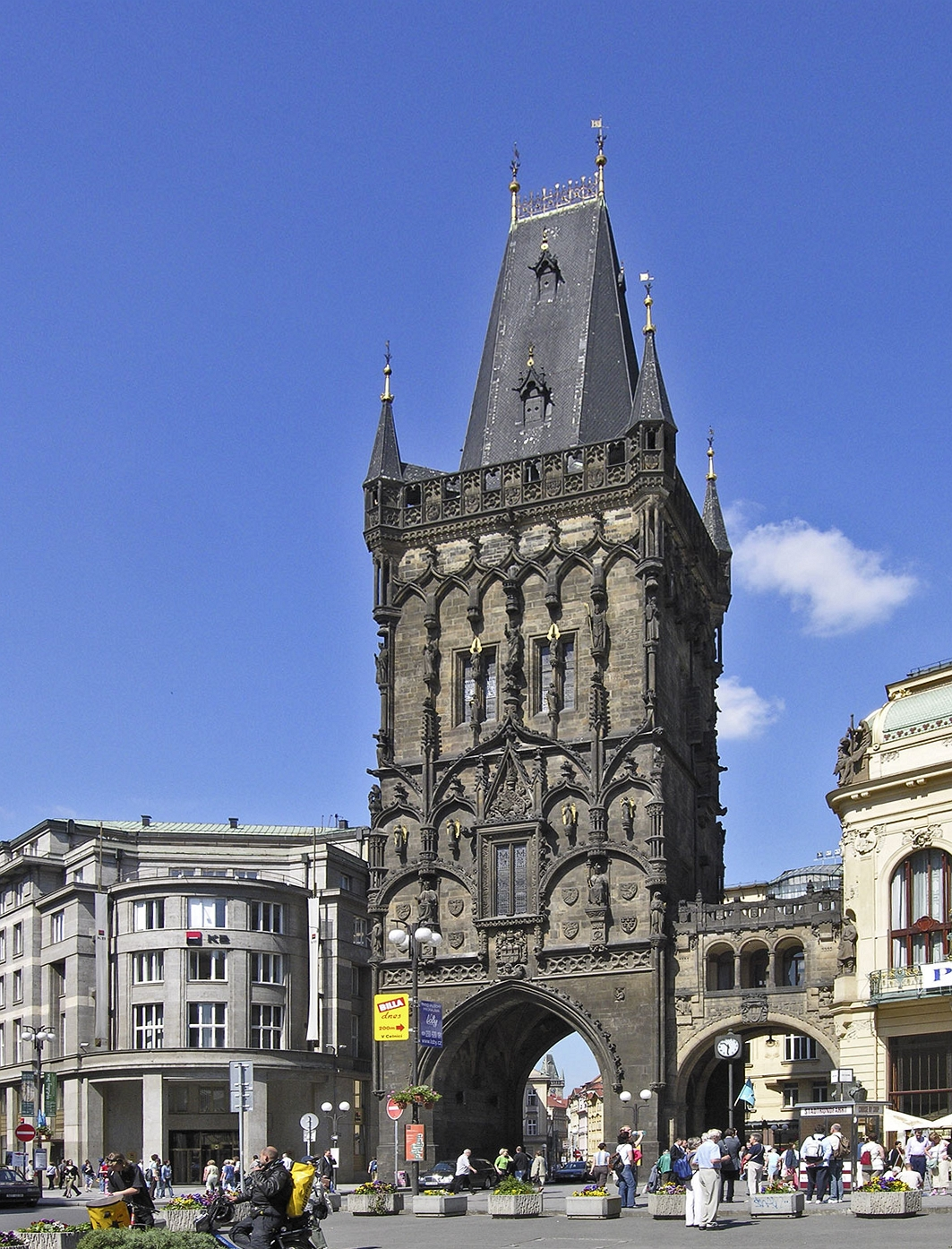
Prague Pulverturm, Gate to the Staré Město

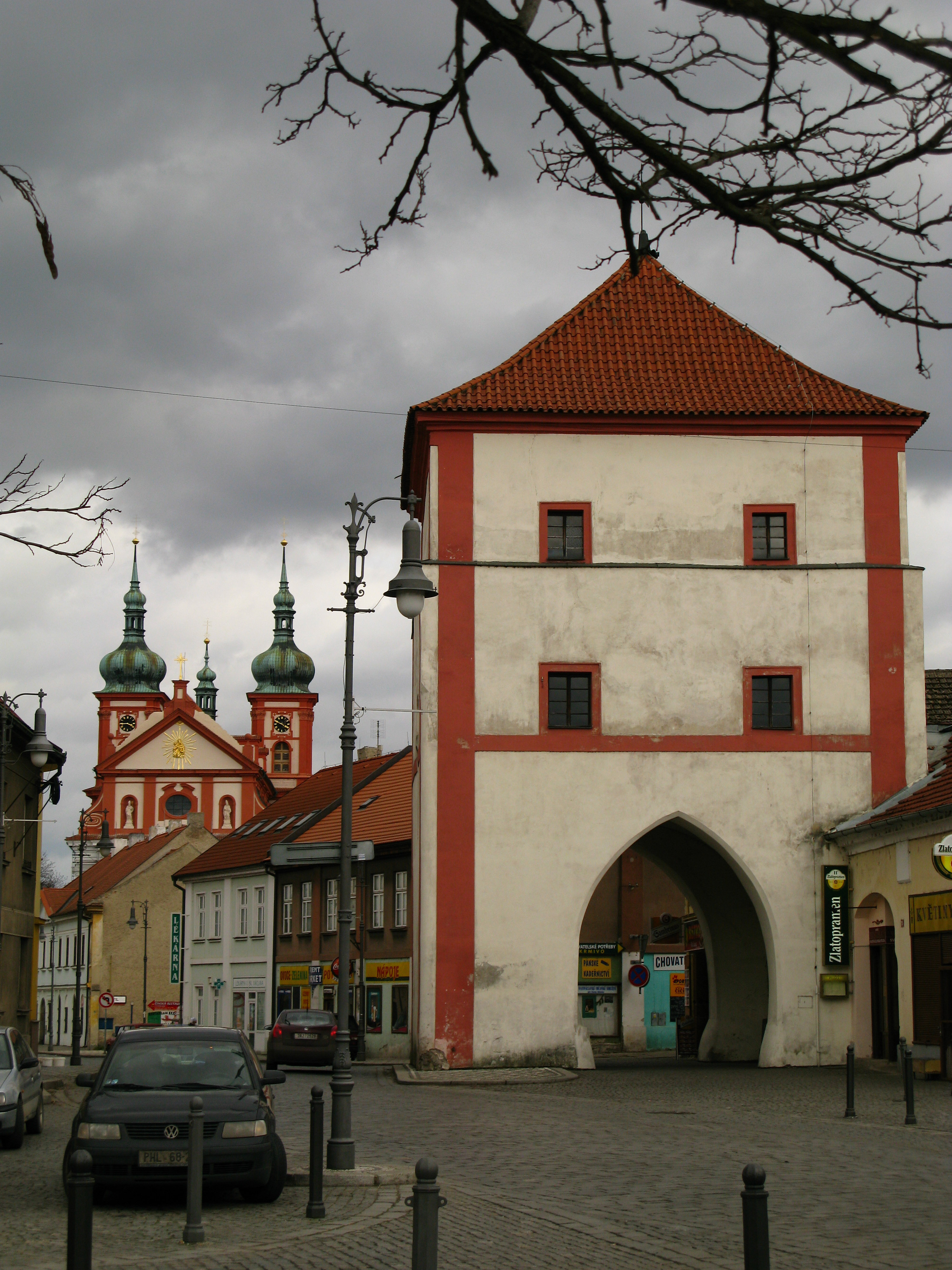
Town gate, Stará Boleslav

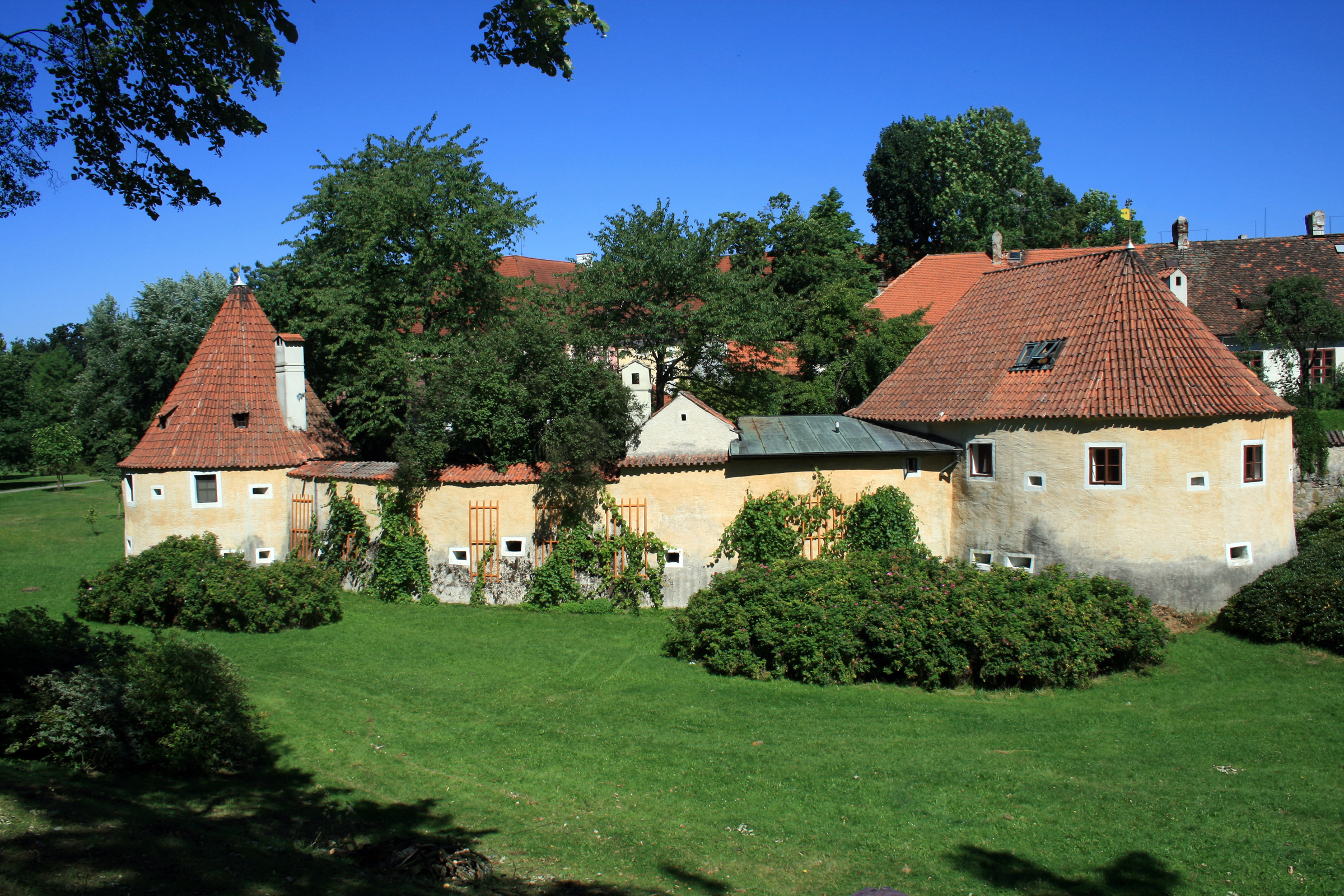
Town wall and defensive bastions in Třeboň

- Bechyně
- Bělá pod Bezdězem
- Benátky nad Jizerou
- Beroun
- Bochov
- Bor
- Brno
- Broumov
- Bruntál
- Čáslav
- Česká Lípa
- České Budějovice
- Český Brod
- Český Dub
- Český Krumlov
- Cheb
- Chrudim
- Chyše
- Dačice
- Domažlice
- Dvůr Králové nad Labem
- Frýdlant
- Fulnek
- Havlíčkův Brod
- Hlučín
- Horažďovice
- Horšovský Týn
- Hostinné
- Hradec Králové
- Hranice
- Jablonné v Podještědí
- Jaroměř
- Jevíčko
- Jičín
- Jihlava – Large parts of the town walls remain to the south, west and east side of the medieval town. Some fragments remain on the north side. The fortifications are also a good example of a Zwinger.
- Jindřichův Hradec
- Josefov
- Kadaň
- Klatovy
- Kolín
- Kostelec nad Labem
- Kouřim
- Krnov
- Kutná Hora
- Kroměříž
- Lanškroun
- Lipník nad Bečvou
- Litomyšl
- Litovel
- Loket
- Louny
- Mělník
- Mladá Boleslav
- Mohelnice
- Náchod
- Nové Město nad Metují
- Nový Bydžov
- Nový Jičín
- Nymburk
- Odry
- Olomouc
- Opočno
- Opava
- Osoblaha
- Ostrava
- Ostrov
- Pardubice
- Písek
- Planá
- Plzeň
- Plumlov
- Polička – Close to 80% of Polička's town walls survive today, in an excellently preserved condition.
- Prachatice
- Prague
  - Hradčany
  - Malá Strana
  - New Town
  - Old Town
  - Vyšehrad
- Přelouč
- Přerov
- Prostějov
- Rabštejn nad Střelou
- Rakovník
- Rataje nad Sázavou
- Rokycany
- Rožmitál pod Třemšínem
- Slaný
- Soběslav
- Sobotka
- Stará Boleslav
- Šternberk
- Štramberk
- Strážnice
- Stříbro
- Svitavy
- Šumperk
- Sušice
- Tábor
- Tachov
- Teplá
- Tovačov
- Třeboň
- Trutnov
- Toužim
- Uherský Brod
- Uničov
- Ústí nad Orlicí
- Valtice
- Velvary
- Vidnava
- Vodňany
- Vraný
- Vysoké Mýto
- Zábřeh
- Zákupy
- Žatec
- Žlutice
- Znojmo – more than half of the walls are preserved, with large parts of the zwinger surviving.

=== Denmark ===
- Fredericia, extensive renaissance ramparts to the north and west of the city and sea facing ramparts.
- Copenhagen, extensive renaissance ramparts to the south and east, trace remains to the north and west, nice fort at the harbor mouth, three small island fortlets outside the harbor entrance.
- Nyborg – the remains include three preserved bastions, a town gate and the old town is still mostly surrounded by a moat indicating the locations of the other (now demolished) bastions.
- Stege, One of the town gates, the Mølleporten, still remains. Most of the earthwork rampart and dry ditch surrounding the town center still remain.

=== Estonia ===
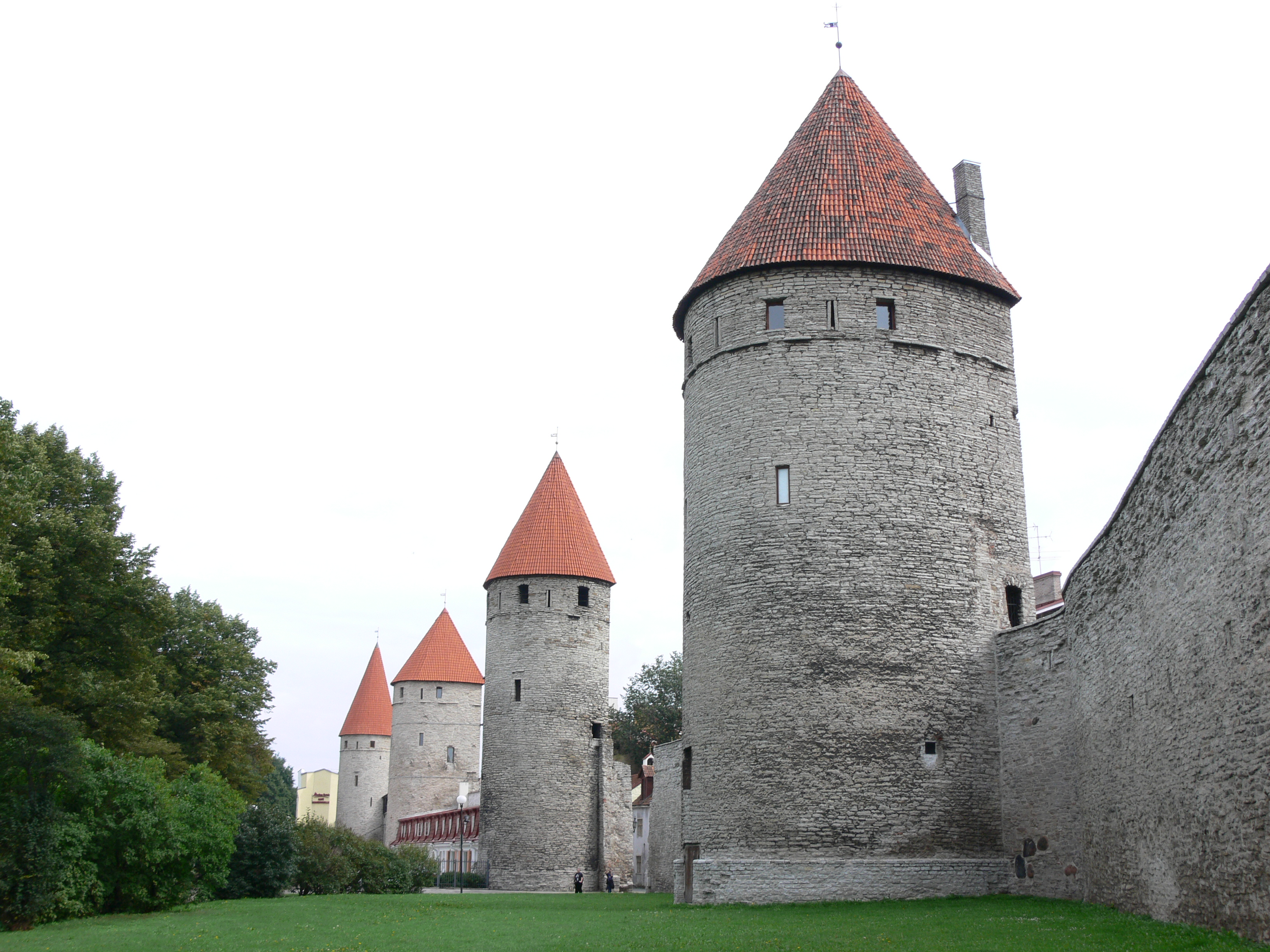
Part of Tallinn City Walls.

- Pärnu, a rampart with two bastions, a moat and a town gate remain to the west of the old town. It is now transformed into a park, the Valli Park.
- Tallinn (and Toompea), see Tallinn City Walls, most of the wall and towers remains
- Tartu, very few sections remained
- Narva, see Narva Bastions, nine bastions and the castle, with Hermann Castle and Victoria Bastion completely restored

=== Finland ===
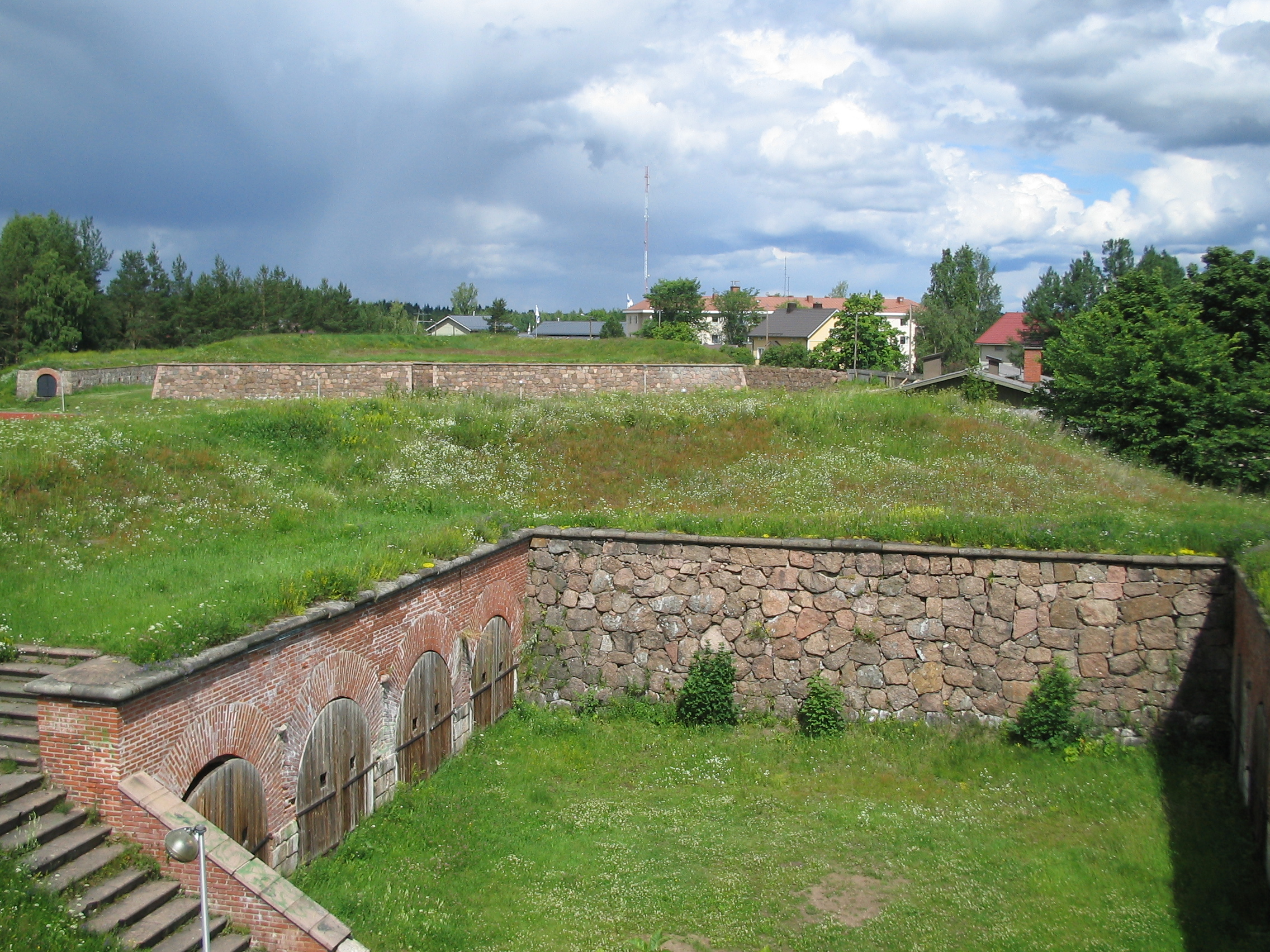
Caponier "Crescent 1" of the Hamina Fortress with the "Arrow fortress" on the background

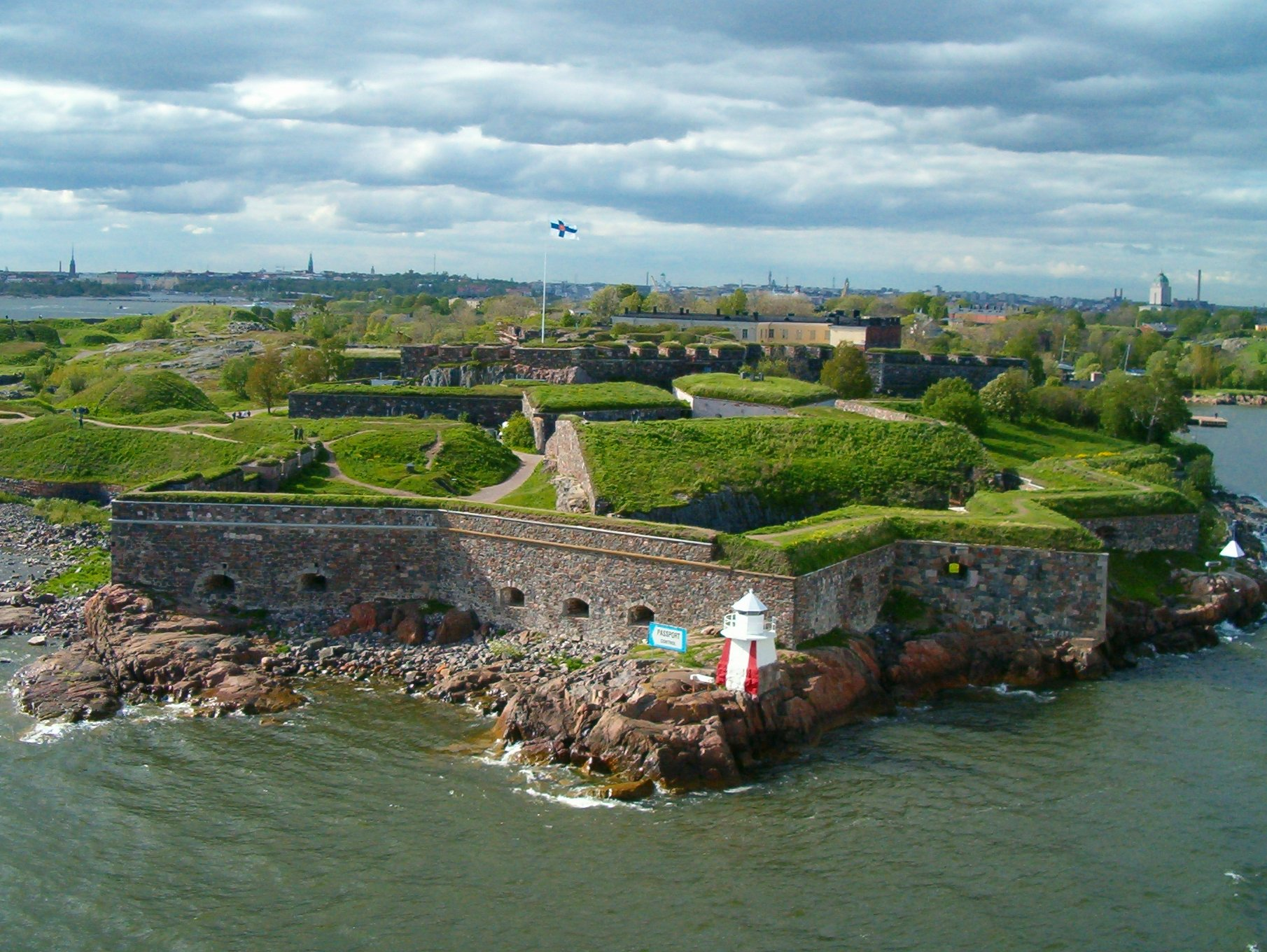
The sea fortress of Suomenlinna off the coast of Helsinki

- Hamina Surrounded by about 4–5 km long star-shaped walled fortification
- Lappeenranta The old center of the town is located inside a fortress
- Loviisa It was planned to build a full fortress around the town, but only two bastions were complete
- Suomenlinna An inhabited sea fortress off the coast of Helsinki

=== France ===
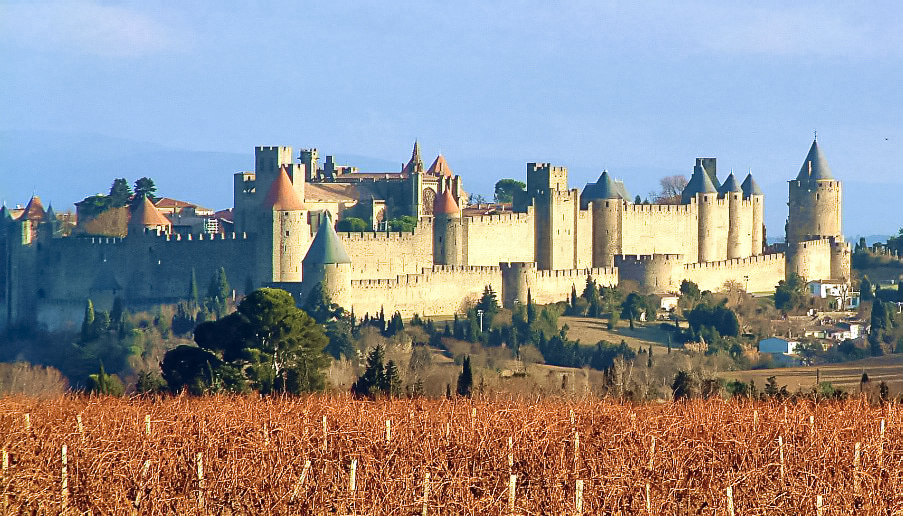
The walled city of Carcassonne in southern France

- Acquigny
- Agde
- Aigues-Mortes
- Ainay-le-Château
- Aire-sur-la-Lys
- Aix-en-Provence
- Alençon, Orne
- Amance, Haute-Saône
- Amboise, Indre-et-Loire
- Ammerschwihr
- Angers, Maine-et-Loire
- Angoulême
- Antibes
- Apt
- Ardres
- Arles
- Arras
- Aubigny-sur-Nère
- Auch
- Autun
- Auvet-et-la-Chapelotte
- Avallon
- Avesnes-sur-Helpe
- Avignon
- Avranches
- Ayherre
- Bâgé-le-Châtel
- Bargème
- Baux-de-Provence
- Bavay
- Bayonne
- Bazas
- Beaugency
- Beaune
- Beauvais
- Béguios
- Bellême
- Bergheim, Haut-Rhin
- Bergues
- Besançon
- Blois, Loir-et-Cher
- Bœrsch
- Boisseron
- Bonneval, Eure-et-Loir
- Bougue
- Bourbon-Lancy
- Bourges
- Bourg-le-Roi
- Briançon
- Brignon
- Briod
- Bruch, Lot-et-Garonne
- Cadillac, Gironde
- Caen
- Cahors
- Campel
- Capdenac
- Carcassonne
- Carignan, Ardennes
- Caudebec-en-Caux
- Cernay, Haut-Rhin
- Chalon-sur-Saône
- Champdieu
- Champigneulles
- Champlitte
- Charleville-Mézières
- Château-Thierry, Aisne
- Châtelais
- Châtillon-sur-Saône
- Chéraute
- Clermont-Ferrand
- Cluny
- Collonges-la-Rouge
- Colmar
- Colmars
- Compiègne
- Compreignac
- Concarneau
- Condé-sur-l'Escaut
- Corbigny
- Cordes-sur-Ciel
- Cormery
- Cosne-Cours-sur-Loire
- Coucy-le-Château-Auffrique – Large parts of the walls remain, though partly in a ruinous state. Remains include several towers, stretches of curtain wall and three gates, the Porte de Laon, Porte de Soissons and the Porte de Chauny.
- Courthézon
- Crécy-la-Chapelle – fragmentary remains
- Créquy
- Cucuron
- Cuiseaux
- Cusset
- Dachstein, Bas-Rhin
- Dambach-la-Ville
- Dax, Landes
- Decize
- Die, Drôme
- Diemeringen
- Dieppe, Seine-Maritime
- Dinan
- Dole, Jura
- Domfront, Orne
- Domme, Dordogne
- Dun-sur-Auron
- Espalion
- Eu, Seine-Maritime
- Évreux
- Falaise, Calvados
- Faucogney-et-la-Mer
- Feurs
- Figeac
- Fos-sur-Mer
- Fougères
- Fréjus, Var
- Givet
- Granville, Manche
- Grenoble
- Guémar, Haut-Rhin
- Guérande
- Hennebont
- Herrlisheim-près-Colmar
- Hesdin
- Hiers-Brouage
- Honfleur
- Île-d'Aix
- Illfurth
- Issoudun, Indre
- Isturits
- Joigny
- La Cavalerie
- La Charité-sur-Loire
- La Chassagne
- La Couvertoirade
- La Groutte
- La Martyre
- La Roche-de-Glun
- La Rochelle
- La Roche-Posay
- La Sauvetat, Puy-de-Dôme
- La Turbie
- Langres
- Lanneray
- Lantabat
- Laon
- Larceveau-Arros-Cibits
- Larressingle
- Laval, Mayenne
- Le Castellet, Var
- Le Crozet
- Le Malzieu-Ville
- Le Mont Saint-Michel
- Le Palais
- Le Poët-Laval
- Le Quesnoy
- Le Thor
- Les Andelys
- Les Cluses
- Levens
- Loches – large parts remain intact. The upper town and the Loches castle are built on a hill which offers a strategic position over the surrounding countryside and the Indre river. The walls of the upper town remain largely intact and include the ruins of the Porte de Saint-Ours, the well preserved Porte Royale, long stretches of curtain wall and several towers and bastions. The walls of the lower town are partly demolished, but 4 towers, a few smaller later-added turrets, a long section of curtain wall and the well preserved Porte des Cordeliers and Porte Picois (which now serves as the City hall) still remain intact.
- Loudun, Vienne
- Lucéram
- Maisod
- Mans
- Marcolès
- Marsal, Moselle
- Marville, Meuse
- Maubeuge
- Mende, Lozère
- Mennetou-sur-Cher
- Metz
- Meursac
- Molsheim
- Monceaux-sur-Dordogne
- Mondoubleau
- Monpazier
- Montarcher
- Montbrison, Loire
- Mont-de-Marsan
- Monteux
- Montfort-sur-Meu
- Montivilliers
- Mont-Louis
- Montréal, Yonne
- Montreuil, Pas-de-Calais
- Montreuil-Bellay
- Montverdun
- Moret-sur-Loing
- Morlaix
- Mougins
- Mouzon, Ardennes
- Nabas, Pyrénées-Atlantiques
- Nages-et-Solorgues
- Nantes
- Narbonne
- Navarrenx
- Neubois
- Neuf-Brisach
- Nevers
- Nice, Alpes-Maritimes
- Nieul-sur-l'Autise
- Nîmes
- Notre-Dame-de-Gravenchon
- Oberhaslach
- Obernai
- Oradour-sur-Glane, Haute-Vienne
- Orange, Vaucluse
- Orgon
- Ostabat-Asme
- Paris
- Parthenay
- Pérouges
- Pertuis
- Pesmes
- Placey
- Ploërmel
- Poitiers, Vienne
- Poligny, Jura
- Pommiers, Loire
- Pont-de-l'Arche
- Pontgibaud
- Pont-l'Abbé-d'Arnoult
- Pontoise
- Pouilly-lès-Feurs
- Prades-le-Lez
- Prats-de-Mollo-la-Preste
- Provins
- Puycelsi
- Quimper, Finistère
- Quintin
- Rânes
- Rauzan
- La Réole
- Revest-des-Brousses
- Ribeauvillé
- Richelieu, Indre-et-Loire
- Rions
- Riquewihr
- Rocamadour
- Rochefort, Charente-Maritime
- Rocroi
- Rodemack
- Romenay
- Rosheim
- Rouffach
- Roye, Somme
- Ruoms
- Saint-Bertrand-de-Comminges
- Saint-Dyé-sur-Loire
- Sainte-Croix-sur-Buchy
- Saint-Émilion, Gironde
- Saintes, Charente-Maritime
- Sainte-Eulalie-de-Cernon
- Sainte-Suzanne-et-Chammes
- Saint-Étienne-de-Baïgorry
- Saint-Félix-Lauragais
- Saint-Gence
- Saint-Hippolyte, Haut-Rhin
- Saint-Jean-Pied-de-Port
- Saint-Junien – A tower and remains of the curtain wall remain behind houses at the junction of the Boulevard de la République and the Rue de Brèche.
- Saint-Laurent-des-Arbres
- Saint-Léger-Magnazeix
- Saint-Lô
- Saint-Macaire
- Saint-Marcouf, Manche
- Saint-Martin-d'Arrossa
- Saint-Mitre-les-Remparts
- Saint-Omer
- Saint-Pastour
- Saint-Paul-de-Vence
- Saint-Pompont
- Saint-Suliac
- Saint-Sulpice-de-Favières
- Saint-Trivier-sur-Moignans
- Saint-Valery-sur-Somme – Large parts remain, including the Porte de Nevers, the Porte Jeanne d'Arc, stretches of curtain wall and some towers. A hill named Cap Hornu arises above the town which is the most likely and possible location of the Roman Saxon Shore fort and harbour named Locus Quartensis sive Hornensis.
- Saint-Vérain
- Saissac
- Sarralbe
- Sarrebourg
- Saumur, Maine-et-Loire
- Sauvain
- Sélestat
- Semur-en-Auxois
- Senlis, Oise
- Sens, Yonne
- Septème
- Sisteron
- Soissons
- Sorel-Moussel
- Strasbourg
- Suèvres
- Thann, Haut-Rhin
- Thionville, Moselle
- Thouars
- Tillac
- Tincry
- Toul, Meurthe-et-Moselle
- Toulouse
- Tours, Indre-et-Loire
- Trôo
- Turckheim
- Uzès
- Vabre
- Vannes
- Vaucouleurs, Meuse
- Venasque
- Vence
- Verdun, Meuse
- Vervins
- Vézelay
- Vianne
- Vienne, Isère
- Viens, Vaucluse
- Vievy-le-Rayé
- Villefranche-de-Conflent
- Villeneuve-sur-Yonne
- Vitré, Ille-et-Vilaine
- Vouvant
- Wangen, Bas-Rhin
- Wattwiller
- Westhoffen
- Wissembourg
- Zellenberg

=== Germany ===
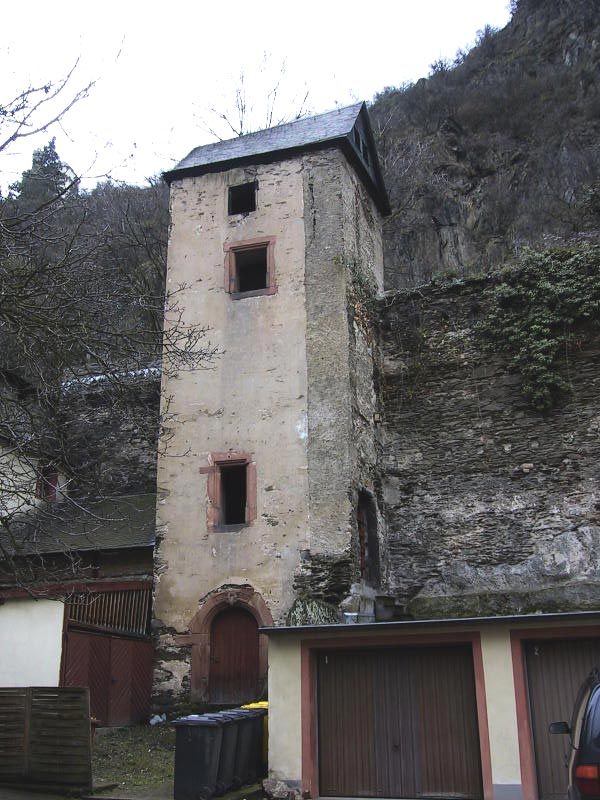
Tower and wall in town of Braubach, Germany

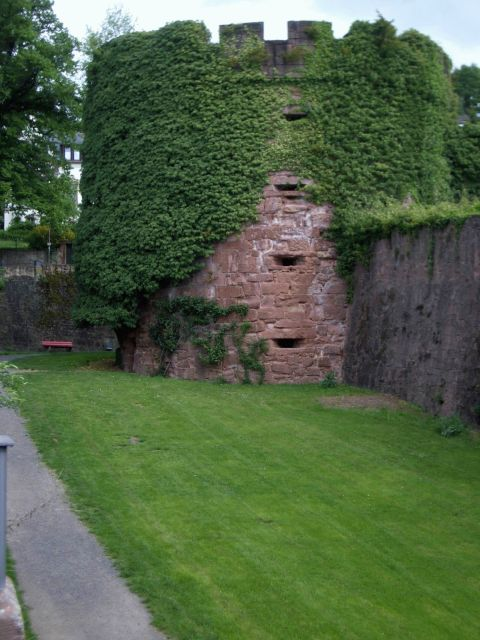
The great bulwark in Büdingen

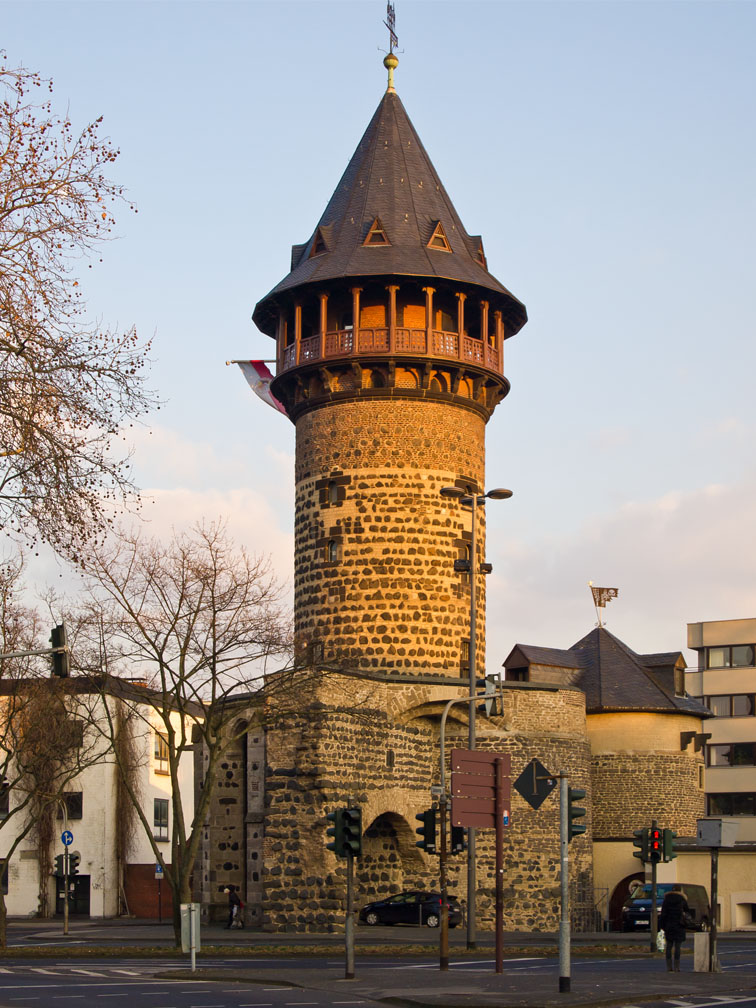
The tower of Ulrepforte in Cologne, Germany, part of former city wall

Tower in Regensburg, Germany part of former city wall

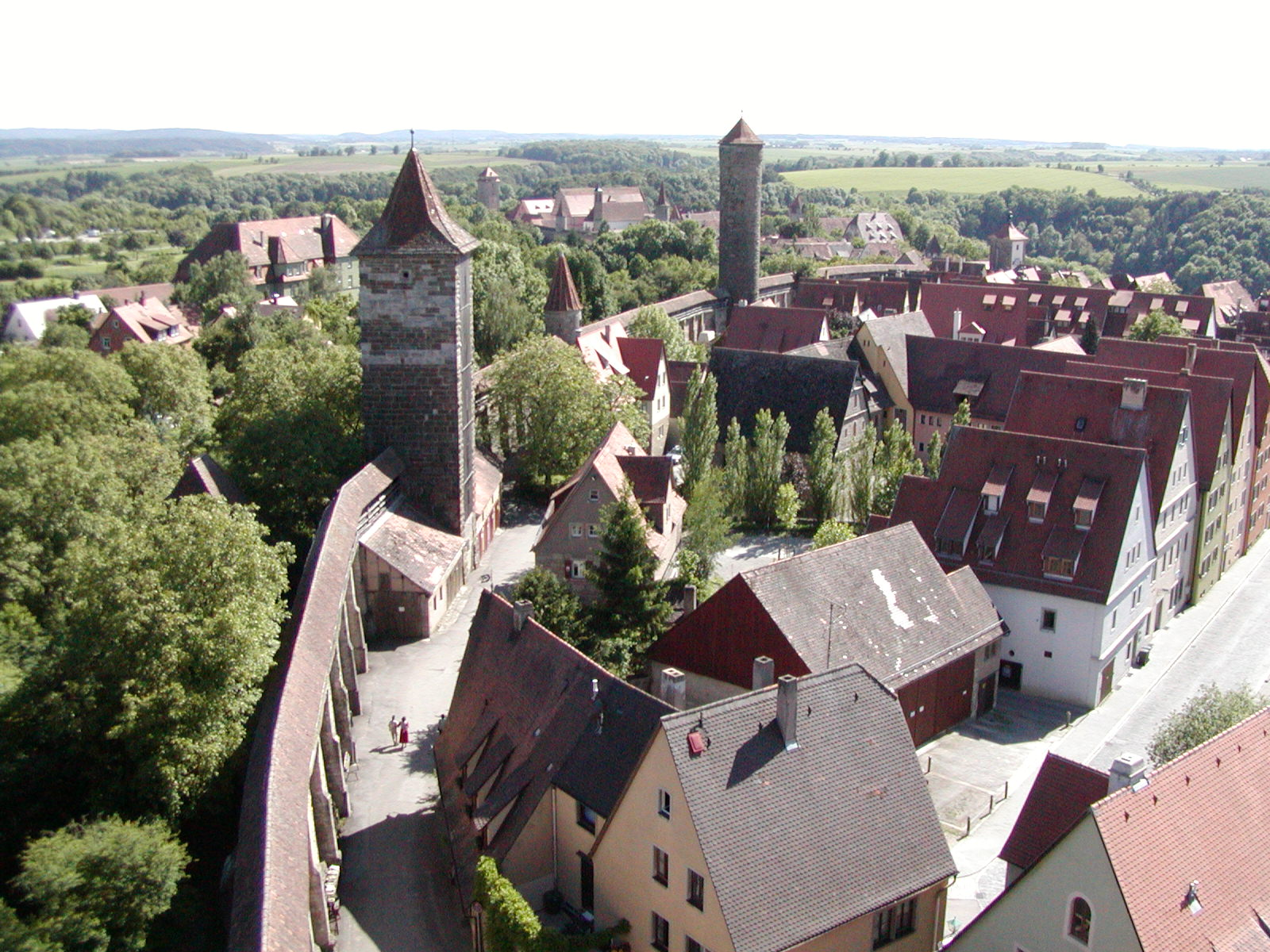
Rothenburg city wall

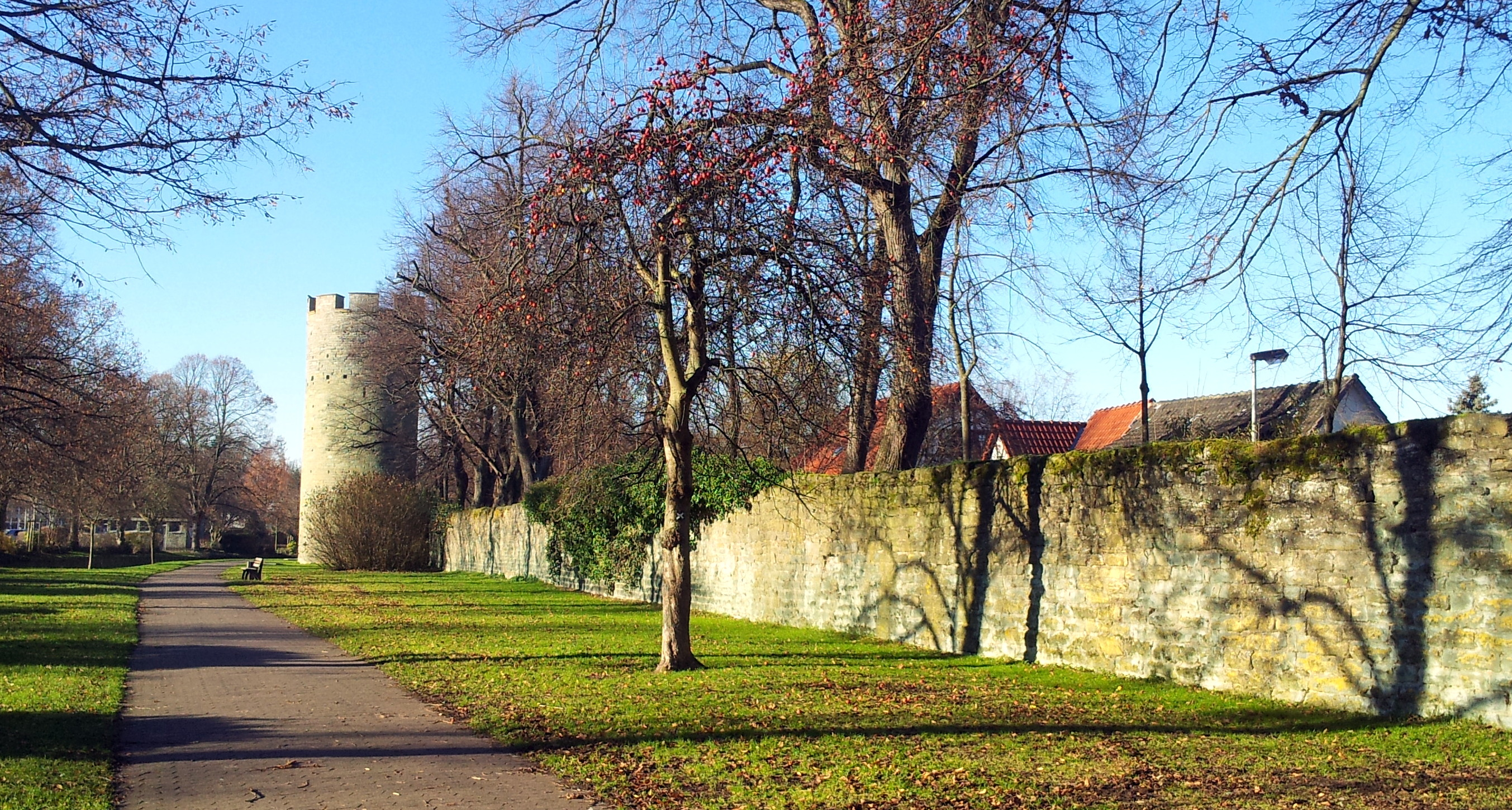
In the moat of Soest, Germany, with city wall and defense tower

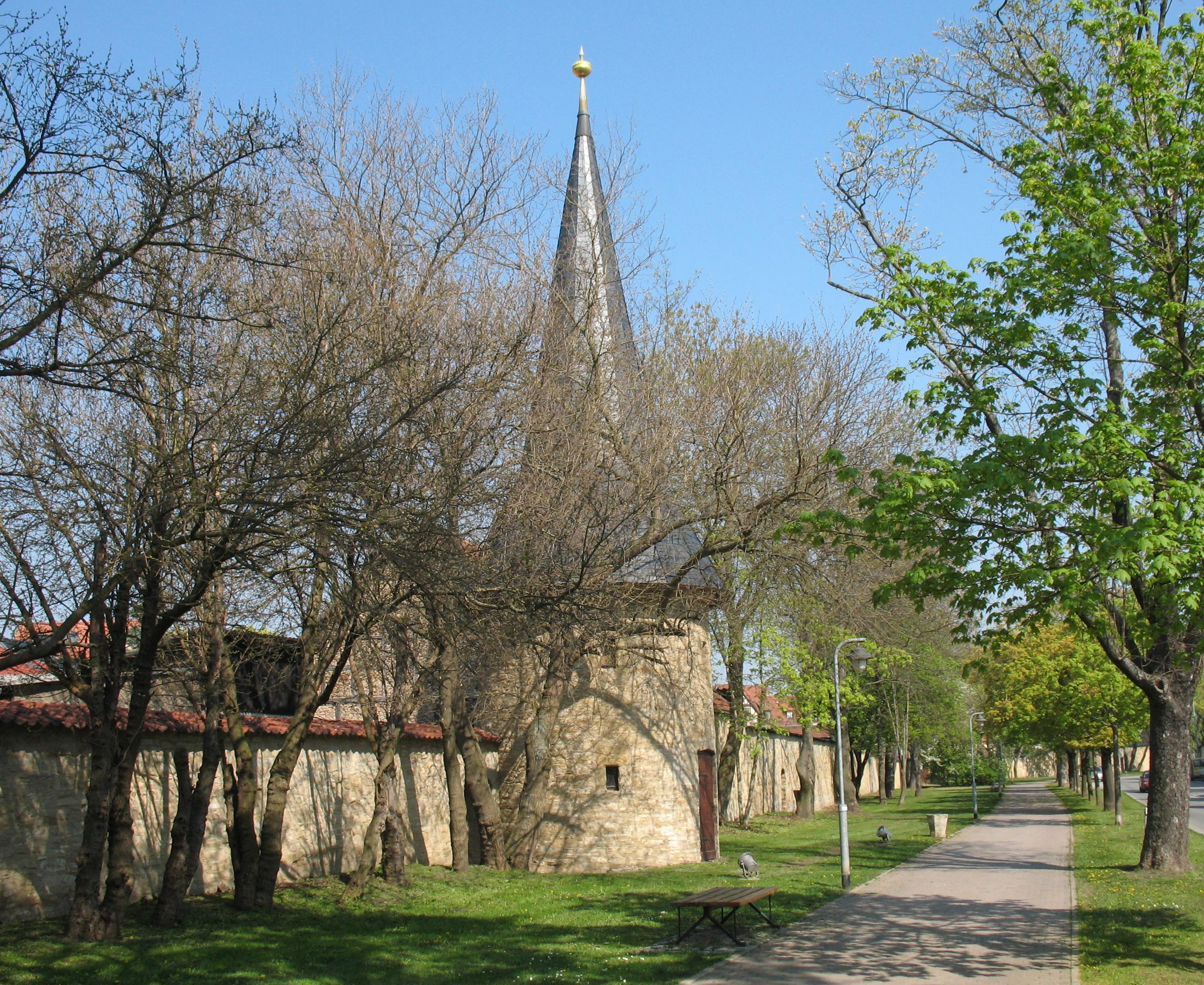
Sömmerda city wall

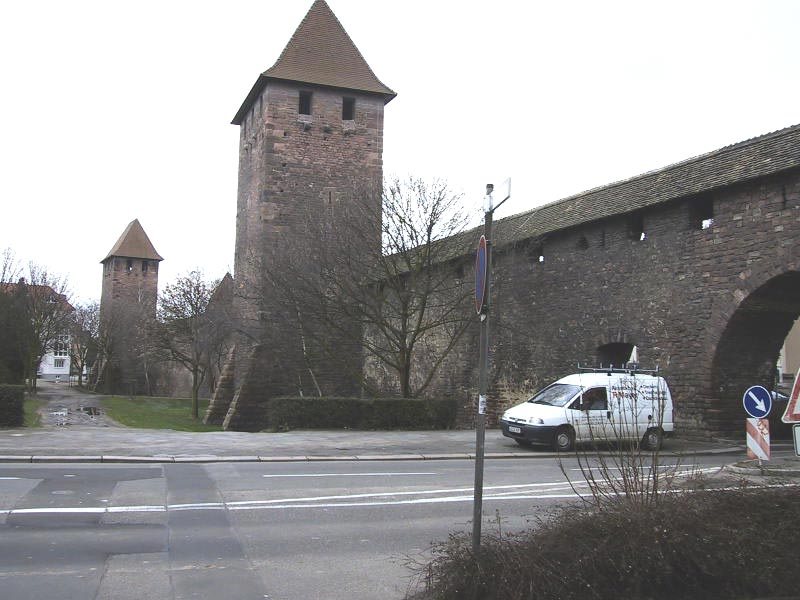
Worms, Germany city walls

- Aachen, some parts of the inner walls still remain alongside Tempelgraben (at the corner with the Eilfschornsteinstraße and the corner with the Pontstraße), and at the back of the houses alongside Seilgraben. Of the outer walls three towers, the Langer Turm, Pfaffenturm and the Marienturm, still stand today. The two remaining city gates, Ponttor and Marschiertor, are among the best preserved gates in Germany.
- Aach
- Abensberg
- Ahrweiler
- Aichach
- Altentreptow – the remains include some stretches of wall, a tower and two town gates, the Brandenburger Tor and the Demminer Tor.
- Annaberg-Buchholz
- Amberg
- Amöneburg
- Andernach
- Arberg – only one town gate remains.
- Arnstadt
- Aschaffenburg
- Aub – large sections of the walls remain, including some towers. One town gate remains, the Zentturm.
- Babenhausen
- Bad Colberg-Heldburg
- Bad Frankenhausen
- Bad Hersfeld
- Bad Langensalza – large parts of the walls still remain today, including 12 wall towers and one city gate, the Klagetor.
- Bad Münstereifel
- Bad Neustadt an der Saale
- Bad Orb
- Bad Rodach
- Bad Sooden-Allendorf
- Bad Waldsee
- Bad Wimpfen
- Bacharach
- Ballenstedt
- Barby
- Bautzen
- Beilngries
- Berching
- Berlin had a defensive wall around the city from about 1250 until the mid-17th century, and a Customs Wall from the mid-18th to the mid-19th centuries. The Berlin Wall that existed from 1961 to 1989 was claimed by the authorities of East Germany to be defensive, but in fact it was rather intended to prevent unauthorized emigration. Parts of Berlin's medieval wall still remain alongside the Littenstraße.
- Bernau bei Berlin
- Bernkastel – one town gate, the Graacher Tor, remains.
- Besigheim
- Blankenburg (Harz)
- Bodenwerder
- Boizenburg
- Boppard
- Bönnigheim – some parts of the walls and a town gate remain.
- Brandenburg
- Buchen
- Burgau
- Burg bei Magdeburg
- Burghausen
- Butzbach
- Büdingen
- Calbe
- Chemnitz – only one tower remains, the Roter Turm (Red Tower).
- Coburg
- Cologne
- Crailsheim – some remains are located north of the Ringgasse, including a wall tower. Another tower remains alongside the Grabenstraße.
- Darmstadt
- Dausenau – the walls remain almost intact. One town gate still remains, the Torturm.
- Delitzsch
- Demmin large parts of the city walls still remain alongside Nordmauer, Bauhofstraße and Südmauer. One town gate still remains, the Luisentor.
- Dettelbach
- Dillenburg
- Dillingen
- Dilsberg
- Dinkelsbühl – the medieval town walls remain fully intact, including 4 gates and 19 towers.
- Dollnstein
- Dömitz
- Donauwörth
- Dresden – Dresden's defensive walls were some of the first in Germany, inspired by the earlier Italian model. The walls surrounded both the ‘Old City’ south of the Elbe, and the ‘New City’ to the north. The walls, gates and moats were largely removed c. 1815, following the Napoleonic Wars, being deemed outmoded for modern warfare. Some small sections have been rediscovered and established as the Museum Festung Dresden https://web.archive.org/web/20160509160153/http://www.festung-dresden.de/de/festung_dresden/museum/ below the more famous Brühl Terrace.
- Duderstadt
- Duisburg
- Ebern
- Eberbach (Baden)
- Eibelstadt
- Eichstätt
- Einbeck
- Eisenheim
- Ellwangen
- Eltville am Rhein
- Emden
- Erding
- Erlangen – some stretches of wall still remain alongside Nördliche Stadtmauerstraße, Wöhrstraße and Schulstraße.
- Feuchtwangen
- Fladungen
- Forchheim
- Freiberg
- Freiburg im Breisgau – only the wall gates remain, although they have been rebuilt several times.
- Freyburg, Germany
- Freystadt
- Friedberg, Bavaria
- Freinsheim
- Frickenhausen am Main
- Fritzlar
- Gangelt
- Gardelegen – there are several remains of the old town wall, including the impressive Salzwedeler Tor, the remains of the Stendaler Tor, and some stretches of wall.
- Gartz (Oder) – The remains of the walls around the medieval town include some sizable stretches of walls, towers and one town gate, the Stettiner Tor.
- Geisa
- Gelnhausen
- Germersheim
- Gerolzhofen
- Göllheim – two town gates are preserved, the Kerzenheimer Tor and the Dreisener Tor. One tower remains, the Ulrichsturm.
- Gräfenberg – the remains include three well-preserved town gates, the Egloffsteiner Tor, the Hiltpoltsteiner Tor and the Gesteiger Tor. Some parts of the walls still remain adjacent to the Gesteiger Tor and at the back of the houses alongside Am Gesteiger and Schulgasse.
- Grebenstein – most of the medieval walls are still surrounding the old town. One town gate remains, the Burgtor.
- Greding
- Grimma
- Grimmen one tower still remains, the Wasserturm. All three of the original town gates also remain, the Stralsunder Tor, Greifswalder Tor and the Mühlentor.
- Großostheim
- Gundelfingen an der Donau
- Gundelsheim
- Gunzenhausen
- Güstrow – remains of the walls remain south of the cathedral and alongside the Gelviner Mauer. The town
- Haldensleben
- Hannoversch Münden
- Hattingen
- Heidelsheim – one town gate and a wall tower still remain today.
- Heidingsfeld, today part of Würzburg
- Heilbad Heiligenstadt
- Herborn
- Herrieden
- Hildburghausen
- Hirschhorn
- Haldensleben
- Hammelburg
- Hardgesen
- Hollfeld – the remains include one town gate, the Obere Tor, and some parts of the walls to the south of the old town.
- Homberg, Efze
- Horn
- Höchstadt an der Aisch
- Höchstädt an der Donau
- Horb am Neckar – large sections of the walls still remain. One town gate, the Ihlinger Tor, still remains, and some towers still remain, most notably the Schurkenturm and the Schütteturm.
- Höxter
- Hünfeld
- Ingelheim am Rhein – sizable remains, including stretches of wall, the Malakoffturm, the Bismarckturm, Ohrenbrückertor, Uffhubtor and the ruined Heidesheimer Tor. The medieval town centre also houses the ruins of the Ingelheimer Kaiserpfalz.
- Ingolstadt
- Iphofen
- Jena
- Kallenhardt
- Karlstadt am Main
- Alt Kaster – The old medieval town of Kaster now forms part of Bedburg. The town walls remain largely intact, including 2 town gates and several towers.
- Kaub
- Kaufbeuren
- Kemnath – several sections and towers of the walls remain around the medieval town. The eastern town gate was later converted into a church tower.
- Kempen – some parts of the walls still remain. They include the Kuhtor, a well-preserved town gate, the Mühlenturm and the remains of another town gate, the Peterstor.
- Kindelbrück
- Kirchberg an der Jagst
- Kirchhain
- Kirchheim unter Teck
- Kitzingen
- Kroppenstedt
- Korbach
- Kranenburg
- Kronach
- Kulmbach
- Kuppenheim
- Kyritz
- Ladenburg
- Landsberg am Lech
- Landshut
- Langenzenn
- Laucha an der Unstrut
- Lauchheim
- Lauingen
- Lauf an der Pegnitz
- Laufen
- Lauffen am Neckar – the old town consists of three parts. While the town is divided by the river Neckar, the castle stands on a small island circled by the river. On the left bank there is a sizable stretch of wall is located next to the church. On the right bank, some towers, stretches of wall and the Neues Heilbronner Tor still remain.
- Leipheim
- Leipzig – remains include the Moritzbastei bastion.
- Leonberg
- Leutershausen
- Löbejün
- Lohr am Main
- Lübben
- Luckau
- Magdeburg
- Mainbernheim
- Maintal – large sections of the walls still remain, notably to the north of the medieval town.
- Mainz – the remains include the well-preserved square-shaped citadel, the medieval Alexanderturm, and the remains of a bastion alongside the Augustusstraße.
- Malchin two town gates still remain, the Kalensches Tor and the Steintor. Some parts of the walls to the south and east of the town still remain.
- Marbach am Neckar
- Markt Einersheim – two town gates still remain.
- Marktbreit
- Mayen
- Meisenheim
- Mellrichstadt
- Memmingen
- Meppen – the remains include a star shaped moat around the medieval town.
- Merkendorf
- Meyenburg
- Michelstadt
- Miltenberg
- Mindelheim
- Möckmühl
- Monheim – two town gates remain, the Oberes Tor and the Unteres Tor.
- Mühlhausen
- Müncheberg
- Munich has some of its former city gates still standing, and a section of its late 13th-century defensive wall.
- Münnerstadt
- Münzenberg – fragments of the walls remain, including two towers.
- Monheim – some stretches of wall still remain and both town gates, the Oberes Tor and the Unteres Tor, are preserved.
- Nabburg
- Naumburg
- Neckarsulm
- Neubrandenburg
- Neubrunn
- Neuburg an der Donau – some parts of the medieval walls still remain, including the Unteres Tor. The trace of the later bastion earthworks, the so-called Untere Schanze, Elias Holl Schanze and Oberer Schanze, is still recognizable in the fields and from the air.
- Neudenau
- Neuenstadt am Kocher
- Neuenstein
- Neuleiningen
- Neumarkt in der Oberpfalz
- Neunkirchen am Brand – three town gates still remain, the Forchheimer Tor, the Erleinhofer Tor and the Erlanger Tor.
- Neuss
- Neustadt (Hessen)
- Neustadt an der Aisch – substantial parts of the walls still remain, including some towers and a well-preserved town gate, te Nürnberger Tor.
- Neustadt in Holstein – one town gate remains, the Kremper Tor.
- Niedernberg – several stretches of the walls remain. One wall tower remains at the riverside end of the Turmgasse
- Niedernhall – most of the town walls remain intact.
- Nordhausen
- Nördlingen
- Nürnberg
- Obernburg am Main
- Oberwesel
- Ochsenfurt
- Oebisfelde
- Oettingen
- Öhringen
- Oldenburg
- Oppenheim – some stretches of the town walls remain near the ruins of Landskron castle. One town gate and two towers remain, the Gautor, the Ruprechtsturm and the Uhrturm.
- Ornbau
- Orsoy
- Ortenberg
- Oschatz
- Ostheim
- Paderborn
- Pappenheim
- Pasewalk
- Tribsees – two town gates remain, the Steintor and the Mühlentor
- Trier-Pfalzel
- Pfullendorf
- Pößneck
- Potsdam
- Prenzlau there are some good remains of the walls, especially North, East and South of the town. 4 gates still remain, the Steintor, Wasserpforte, Mitteltor and the Blindower Tor. The walls also include 25 towers.
- Prenzlin
- Prichsenstadt
- Querfurt
- Radolfzell am Bodensee
- Ratingen
- Ravensburg – three town gates still remain, the Frauentor, Obertor and the Untertor. Nine of the original ten wall towers still remain, most notably a tower named Mehlsack.
- Recklinghausen two defensive towers and some portions of wall still remain today, north west of the old city.
- Reichelsheim – three towers remain.
- Rodach
- Rees – large parts of the town walls still remain intact, mainly located at the riverside of the town and in the parks at the north-east and west side of the medieval town.
- Rheinbach
- Rheinberg
- Rhens – the town walls remain largely intact. Three town gates still remain, the Rheintor, the Josephstor and the ruins of the Viehtor.
- Rostock
- Röttingen
- Roth
- Rothenburg ob der Tauber
- Rottweil
- Rüthen
- Salzkotten
- Salzwedel
- Schleusingen
- Schlüsselfeld
- Schmalkalden
- Schongau, Bavaria
- Schrobenhausen
- Schwaigern
- Schwalmstadt – the remains of a town gate still survive, the medieval Lüdertor. The earthworks are mostly demolished, leaving a moat of which the course indicates the location of four round bastions.
- Schweinfurt
- Seehausen – the moat still surrounds most of the medieval town. Fragments of the walls are to be found at the southern side of the old town. One town gate still remains, the Beustertor.
- Seßlach
- Seligenstadt – the remains include the Steinheimer Torturm, the Pulverturm and a tower at the Friedhofsmauer.
- Segnitz
- Soest – 2.5 km of the town walls (1180) are still intact, also a town gate ("Osthofentor", with the world largest collection of crossbow bolts) and a defense tower ("Kattenturm").
- Sommerach
- Sömmerda
- Sommerhausen
- Spalt
- Spangenberg
- Stade
- Staßfurt
- Stadt Blankenberg
- Steinheim
- Steinau an der Straße
- Stendal – two town gates still remain.
- Sternberg
- Stadtsteinach
- Stralsund
- Sulzbach – sizable parts of the walls and towers still remain. One town gate is preserved, the Rosenberger Tor.
- Sulzfeld am Main
- Tangermünde – most of the town walls still remain, including some towers.
- Templin
- Themar
- Treysa – the remains are located mainly South, East and North of the old town.
- Trier, portions of the city walls still exist, but the size of the Roman gate, the "Porta Nigra", gives evidence of the importance of the city. Other Roman remains include the baths, the Constantine Basilica, an amphitheater, and a 2nd-century AD Roman bridge.
- Torgau
- Überlingen
- Uffenheim
- Ulm an der Donau
- Villach
- Villingen
- Vilseck
- Vilshofen an der Donau
- Vellberg
- Volkach
- Waiblingen
- Waldenburg
- Waldfeucht
- Wangen im Allgäu
- Warburg (Westfalia)
- Wassertrüdingen
- Wemding
- Weikersheim
- Weil der Stadt
- Weilrod – the only town gate still remains.
- Weißenburg (Bavaria)
- Werben – one town gate still remains to the north east of the medieval town, the Elbtor. A tower with adjacent portion of the town wall remains to the west of the medieval town.
- Wertheim
- Wettenberg
- Windsbach
- Winterhausen
- Wittstock
- Witzenhausen
- Woldegk
- Wolframs-Eschenbach
- Worms, Germany
- Wörth am Main
- Wunsiedel 3 towers, small portions of the walls and a town gate (Koppetentor) still remain.
- Würzburg
- Xanten
- Zeil am Main
- Zerbst
- Zons
- Zülpich
- Zwickau

=== Gibraltar ===
- Gibraltar

=== Greece ===
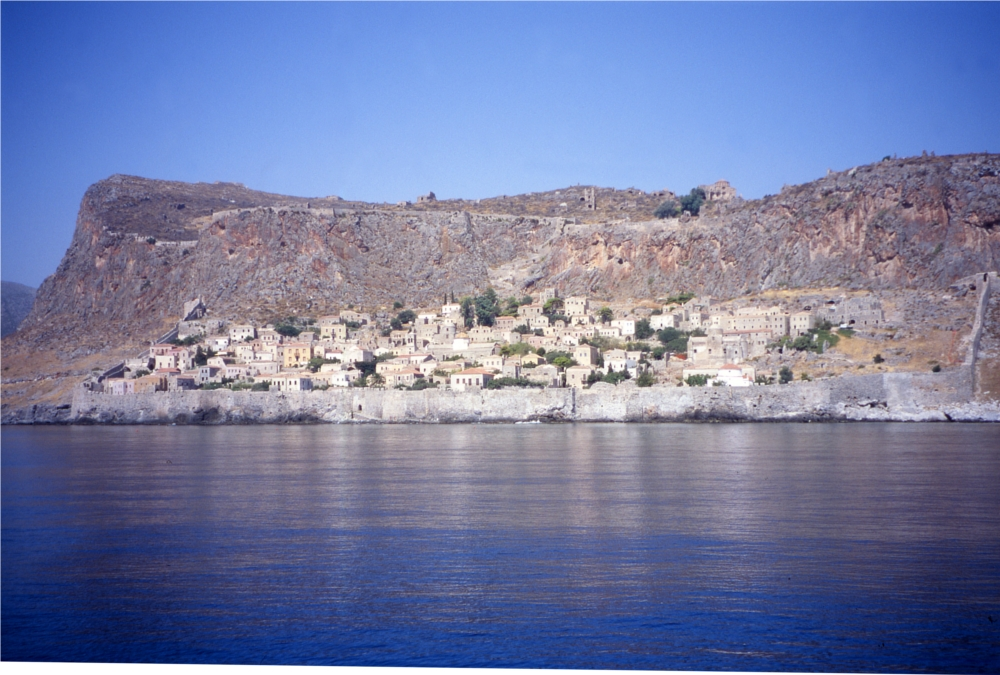
The walled medieval city of Monemvasia in southern Greece.

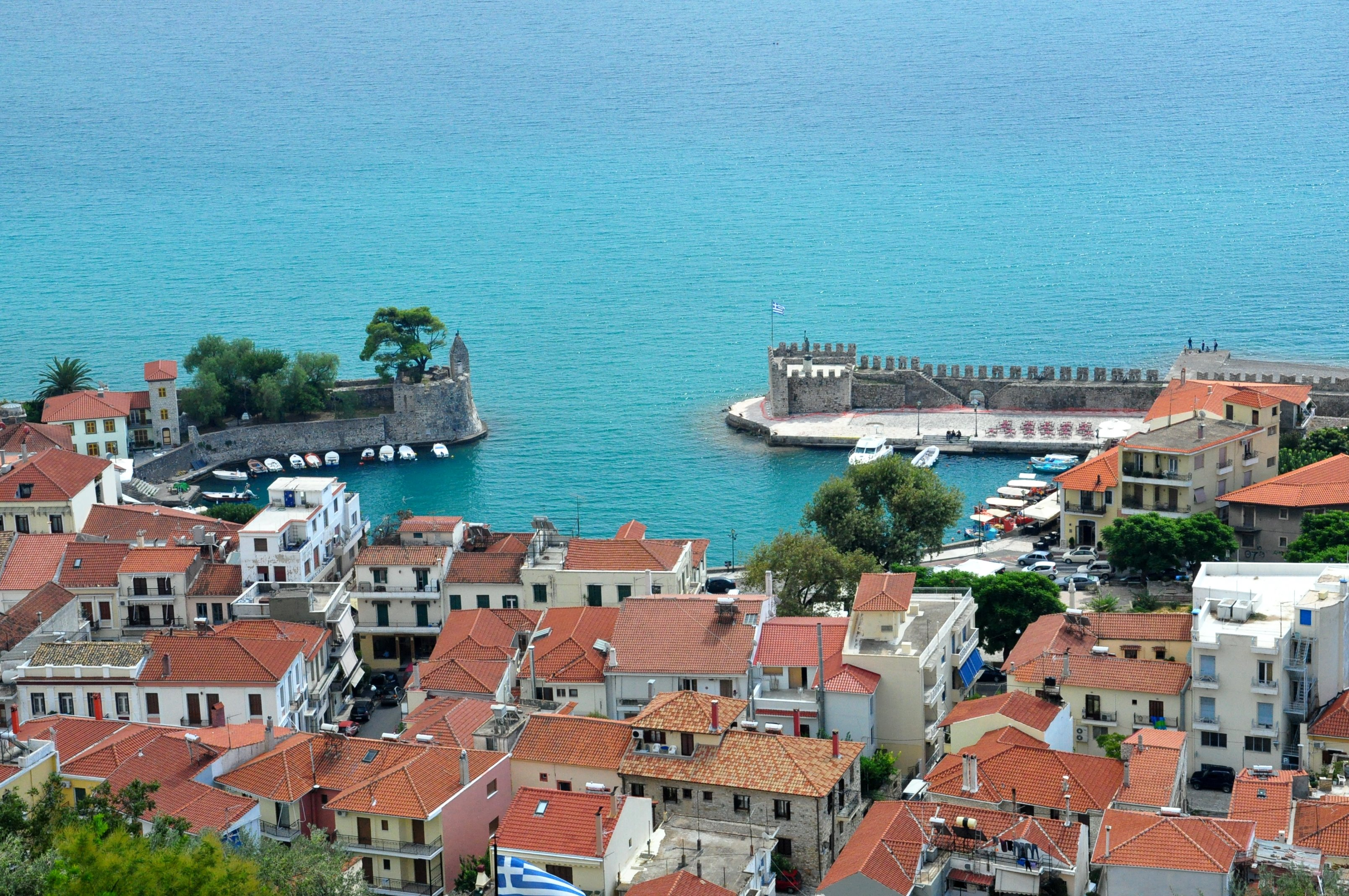
The seaside walls of Naupactus, Greece.

Many towns and cities still retain at least parts of their defensive walls, including:

- Arta
- Athens – mostly demolished, see city walls of Athens
- Chania – see Fortifications of Chania
- Chios
- Corfu (city)
- Drama, Greece – sizable parts of the town walls remain to the north and east side of the old town. Including 2 towers and stretches of wall.
- Heraklion Candia Khandak – see Fortifications of Heraklion see siege of Candia – Arab and Byzantine walls still remain, about 20%, Venetian 7.5 km long walls, 95% still remain, 30.000 people live now inside the Venecian walls. Two gates, one castle in the sea (Koules)
- Ioannina – see Ioannina Castle
- Kastoria – fragmentary remains.
- Kavala (a significant part of the seaside walls survive)
- Kissamos
- Komotini
- Koroni – preserved fortifications of the castle and upper town.
- Missolonghi
- Monemvassia
- Mystras
- Nafplion
- Naupactus
- Preveza
- Rethymno – see Fortezza of Rethymno
- Rhodes – see Fortifications of Rhodes
- Thessaloniki – see Walls of Thessaloniki
- Veria (about 170 m of the Byzantine walls survive)

=== Hungary ===
- Buda – the Castle Hill is surrounded by preserved medieval and early modern fortifications. Only a short section survived from the walls of the Víziváros neighbourhood.
- Pest – segments of the 15th-century city walls are preserved inside the courtyards of later houses.
- Eger – some segments preserved, mostly demolished
- Győr – the walls were demolished in the 19th century but segments are preserved
- Komárom
- Kőszeg
- Mosonmagyaróvár – the walls were demolished in the 1820s
- Pécs – long sections of the medieval walls are preserved and freed to later intrusions.
- Sárospatak
- Sopron – medieval circle of walls partly built on ancient Roman foundations
- Szécsény – some segments of the city walls preserved
- Székesfehérvár – long sections of the medieval walls are preserved
- Vác – some segments and one tower preserved
- Veszprém – walled old town on Castle Hill

=== Republic of Ireland ===
Place	County	Condition	Image	Notes
Ardee	County Louth			
Athenry	County Galway			
Athlone	County Westmeath			
Bandon	County Cork			
Carlingford	County Louth			
Cashel	County Tipperary			
Clonmel	County Tipperary			
Cork	County Cork			
Drogheda	County Louth			Saint Laurence Gate, Drogheda is an original barbican dating from the 13th century. Another town gate survives in Drogheda, the Buttergate. It is thought to have been used as a pedestrian entrance to the town as no road ran to or from it.
Fethard	County Tipperary			Still retains over a kilometer of medieval town wall – 90% of the circuit. Some sections survive to a height of over 8 meters (26 feet).
Dublin	County Dublin			
Galway	County Galway			
Kilkenny	County Kilkenny			
Kilmallock				
Limerick	County Limerick			
New Ross	County Wexford			
Rindoon / Lecarrow	County Roscommon			The best preserved abandoned medieval town in Ireland
Trim	County Meath			
Waterford	County Waterford			
Wexford	County Wexford			
Youghal	County Cork			

=== Italy ===
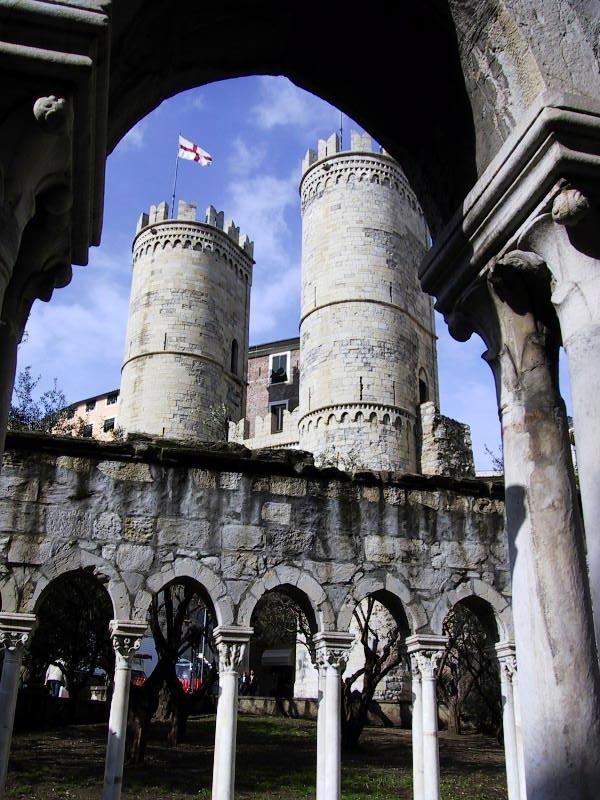
Towers for city wall in Genoa.

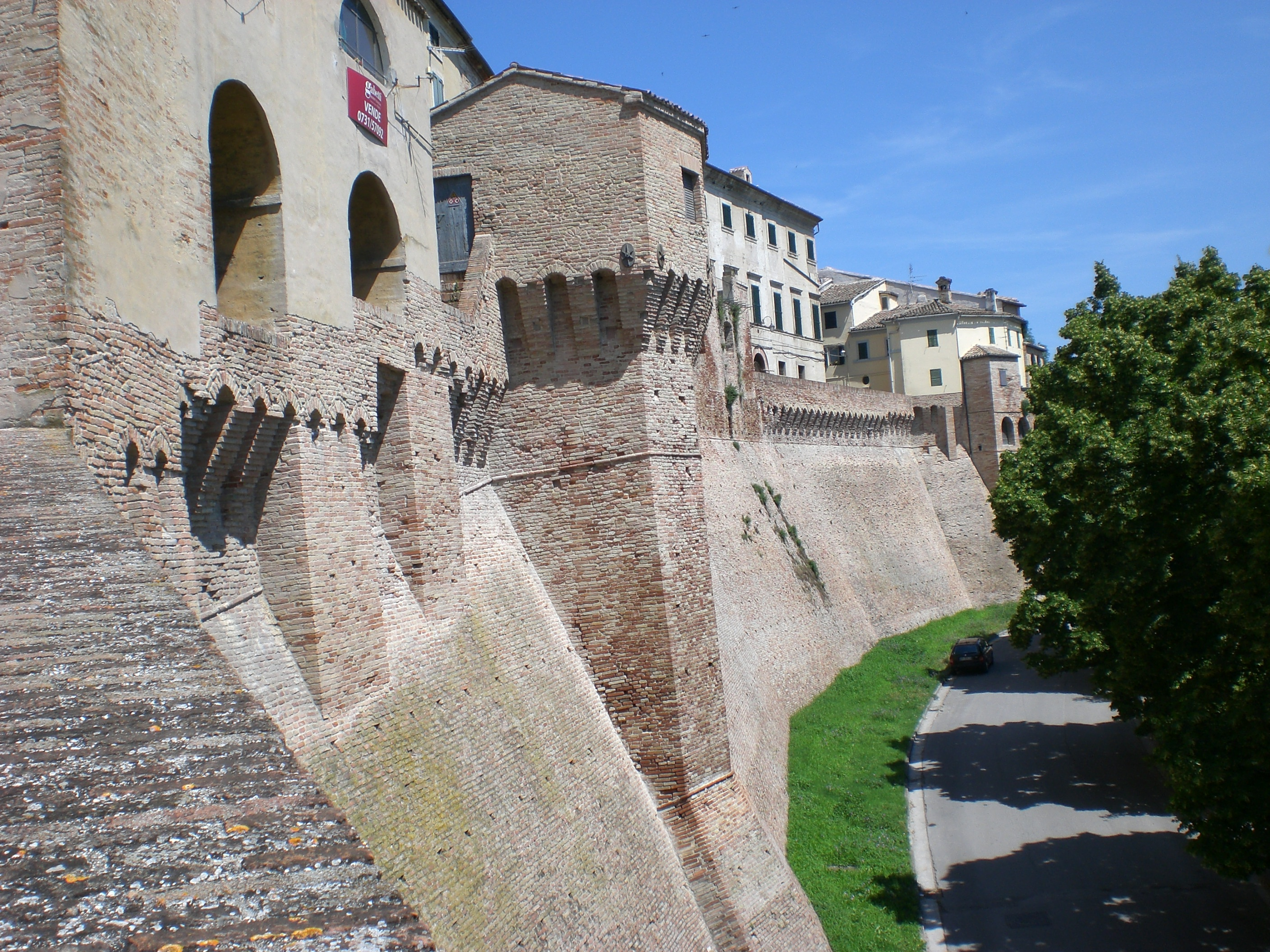
Town wall in Jesi.

- Acqui Terme – three town gates and remains of walls.
- Acuto
- Albenga – fragmentary remains, including stretches of wall and 3 town gates.
- Alghero
- Altamura – some remains; two gates are still visible, namely Porta Bari and Porta dei Martiri
- Ancona
- Anghiari
- Aosta's Roman walls are still preserved almost in their entirety
- Appignano
- Aquasparta
- Arcevia
- Asolo
- Assisi
- Arezzo – Large parts of the town walls still survive, including several stretches of curtain wall, 6 bastions, 4 town gates and the well preserved citadel Fortezza Medicea.
- Bagnacavallo – two town gates remain.
- Bari – historically a walled port city on a promontory but only two bastions and a short section of the sea walls survived
- Bassano del Grappa
- Bastia Umbra
- Belvedere Ostrense
- Belluno
- Bergamo – surrounding hill of the old city
- Bisceglie
- Bologna
- Bosco Marengo – a large part of the north-western walls with towers are preserved.
- Bozzolo
- Brescia – the castle hill (called Cidneo Hill) is surrounded by preserved medieval and Renaissance fortifications. Segments of Roman and venetian walls are partially survived
- Brindisi – several parts of the walls are preserved, including 5 bastions and two town gates, the Porta Lecce and the Porta Mesagne.
- Brixen – the western gate remains as well as the north side where the houses serves as walls
- Bruneck – three gates remain, the western, northern and eastern ones.
- Busseto
- Cagli
- Cagliari
- Caltagirone
- Camerino
- Capua
- Castel Bolognese – three wall towers still remain.
- Castel del Monte
- Castel Goffredo – tiny fraction of the walls and a tower remain
- Castelfranco Veneto – the old town is completely surrounded by medieval walls and a moat
- Castelvetro di Modena
- Castelsardo
- Castiglion Fiorentino
- Castiglione di Garfagnana
- Castiglione del Lago's old town has fully preserved walls
- Cesena
- Cingoli
- Cittadella – one of the best preserved walled towns in Italy, there's a small breach on the northwestern part (the walls are fully walkable)
- Città della Pieve
- Città di Castello
- Cividale del Friuli – small part of the walls remain on the north east
- Colmurano
- Cologna Veneta – minor part of the walls remaining on the western side
- Como – about 70% is remaining with a few towers
- Cordovado – two town gates remain
- Corinaldo
- Corridonia
- Cortona
- Crema (Venetian walls of Crema)
- Crotone
- Domodossola – a tiny fraction remains behind the church
- Este, Veneto – parts of walls still remaining
- Fabriano
- Faenza
- Falerone
- Fano – large sections of the Roman walls and towers are preserved. One town gate still remains, the Roman Arco di Augusto.
- Felizzano
- Ferrara – originally 13 km now 9 km remain
- Firenzuola
- Fiuggi
- Florence
- Foligno
- Fossano – a minor part remains, particularly a bastion at the north end
- Forlì – remains include the ruins of the Porta Schiavona. The foundations of a tower can be found in the roundabout at the Piazza Santa Chiara.
- Gallipoli
- Gemona
- Genoa has partial fortifications still standing
- Glurns Glorenza in Italian, the medieval stone walls fully encapsulate the old town
- Gradara
- Gradisca d'Isonzo – large part of the walls and towers still intact
- Grosseto's star shaped town walls are almost completely intact.
- Guardiagrele
- Guastalla – a star-shaped road around the town indicates the trace of the fortifications. A wall tower still stands at the corner Via Giuseppe Verdi/Via Volturno.
- Iglesias
- Isernia
- Ivrea
- Jesi
- Lanciano
- Lazise – part of the northern and southern walls still intact, including several towers and 3 town gates.
- Lecce
- Lecco – small part of the walls remains on the north east
- Leonessa
- Livorno
- Loano
- Loro Piceno
- Lucca
- Macerata
- Marostica – The defensive walls around the old town are fully intact. The walls are among the best preserved medieval defensive structures in Italy. Including 3 town gates, 20 towers and two castles, the Castello Superiore and the Castello Inferiore.
- Marsala
- Marta
- Massa Martana
- Massa Fermana
- Matera
- Melfi
- Messina – see Fortifications of Messina
- Mignano Monte Lungo – the Porta Fratte town gate is the only remain of the medieval town walls.
- Mineo
- Mondolfo
- Monopoli
- Montefalco
- Montegiorgio
- Monteriggioni
- Montagnana – perfectly preserved medieval walls and one of the most impressive in Europe
- Montappone – small fortified town. The town directly borders the walled town of Massa Fermana
- Montecassiano
- Montecatini Terme
- Monte San Giusto – fragmentary remains, including an impressive town gate and a tower.
- Monte San Pietrangeli
- Monte San Savino
- Monte Vidon Corrado
- Muggia – remains include two towers, two stone bastions, two town gates and large stretches of the walls.
- Naples
- Nardò – several fragments of the walls still stand around the town, including many towers which are incorporated in houses.
- Narni
- Nettuno
- Noale
- Norcia
- Novi Ligure
- Orbetello
- Orvieto
- Ostra
- Ostuni
- Otranto
- Padua
- Palmanova has fortress plan and structure, called a star fort it is a nine pointed citadel
- Pavia
- Perugia
- Pesaro – the remains include two bastions, a curtain wall and a town gate, the Porta Rimini.
- Peschiera del Garda – fortified town surrounded by water
- Peschici
- Petriolo
- Piacenza has large sections of its Renaissance walls still standing
- Piglio
- Piombino
- Pisa
- Pistoia
- Pizzighettone – nearly completely surrounded by walls apart from a few breaches
- Pollenza
- Pontremoli
- Portobuffolé – little town with a gate remaining
- Portoferraio
- Pozzuoli
- Prato
- Procida
- Rapagnano
- Rapolano Terme
- Ravenna
- Reggio Emilia – very little remains of the medieval town walls. One town gate remains, the impressive Porta Santa Croce. A stretch of wall is located at the Viale Monte Grappa.
- Ricetto di Candelo – small town completely surrounded by walls
- Rieti
- Rimini
- Riva del Garda – parts of the walls and two gates remain
- Rome has walls, including the Aurelian Walls since the Roman Empire
- Rovereto – a part of the medieval stone walls remains on the eastern side
- Sabbioneta – surrounded by a star fort
- Salò – two gates remaining
- San Costanzo – one of the smallest fortified towns in Italy
- San Gemini
- San Gimignano
- San Severino Marche
- San Vito al Tagliamento – part of the walls remain and three gates
- Santarcangelo di Romagna – most of the medieval town wall remains around the old town, including long stretches of wall, a gate and several towers.
- Sansepolcro
- Sant'Angelo in Pontano
- Sassari fragmentary remains, mainly at the north side of the old town.
- Sciacca
- Senigallia
- Sesto al Reghena – two gates remain
- Siena
- Syracuse
- Soave – town surrounded by medieval walls and three gates (Porta Bassano, Porta Vicentina and Porta Verona)
- Soncino – nearly completely surrounded by walls and a moat
- Spilamberto – one town gate still remains.
- Spilimbergo
- Spoleto
- Staffolo
- Sterzing – a tower gate remains
- Sulmona
- Susa – fragmentary remains of Roman walls. The cathedral is built against the side of the Roman town gate Porta Savoia. Several parts of the walls and three lowered towers can be found alongside the Corso Unione Sovietica.
- Talamone
- Tarquinia
- Termoli
- Terra del Sole almost all town walls remain, with four bastion and two gate (Porta Romana and Fiorentina). Ideal-town of renaissance
- Todi
- Torre San Patrizio
- Torri del Benaco – minor part of the wall remaining on the south side
- Trapani
- Treia
- Trevi
- Treviso
- Turin – the remains include the impressive Roman town gate Porta Palatina and 3 bastions with turrets and curtain walls in the park nearby the Porta Palatina.
- Tuscania
- Udine – fraction of the walls remain and two gates
- Urbino
- Urbisaglia
- Verona
- Venzone – medieval stone walls surrounding the town, partly rebuilt after the 1976 earthquake
- Vicenza large sections of the town walls still remain, mainly alongside the Viale Giuseppe Mazzini, Via Goivanni Cecciarini and the Via Legione Gallieno. Four town gates remain, the Porta San Bortolo, Porta Santa Lucia, Porta Castello and the Porta Santa Croce.
- Villafranca di Verona – completely intact walls part of the castle
- Viterbo – completely intact walls
- Volterra

=== Latvia ===
- Riga – the best preserved part of the old town walls is the Powder Tower. Just north west of the Powder Tower remains a stretch of wall with a square tower. Foundations of the wall can be seen at Kalēju iela street, and there are fragments of a ruined wall at the site of a demolished building at Minsterejas iela street. The only remains of the earthen ramparts around the old town is a star shaped moat, now transformed into a park.
- Cēsis
- Daugavpils fortress (Not a true walled city, but a huge fortress with buildings)
- Limbaži
- Valmiera

=== Lithuania ===
- Vilnius (Can be seen in some places)
- Kaunas (Partially built)

=== Luxembourg ===
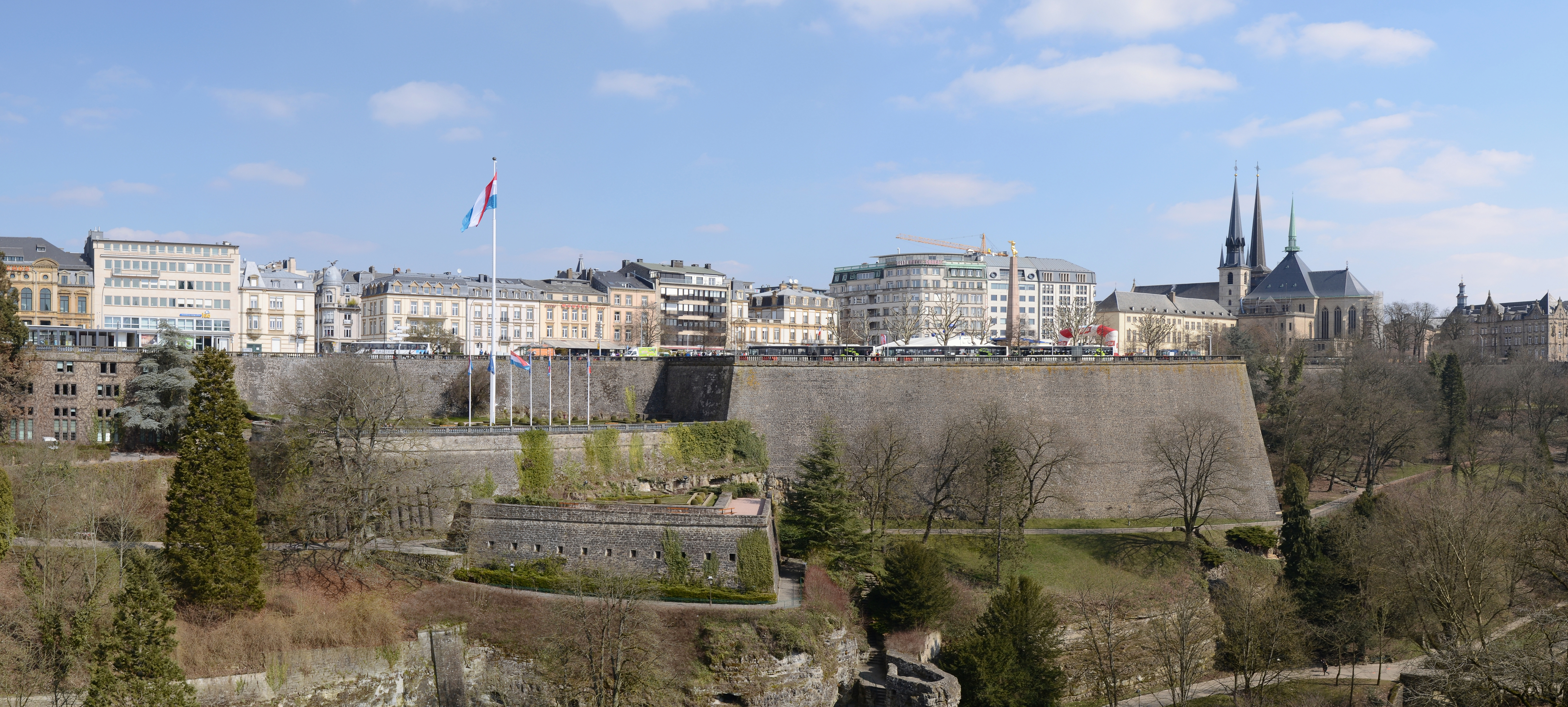
Bastion Beck from Metz Square in Luxembourg City.

- Luxembourg City

=== North Macedonia ===
- Ohrid
- Skopje

=== Malta ===
Place	Region	Condition	Image	Notes
Birgu	South Eastern Region	Mostly intact		Main article: Fortifications of Birgu An ancient Castrum Maris stood in Birgu since the 13th century. This was rebuilt as Fort St Angelo in the 16th and 17th centuries, when walls surrounding the entire city were built. Most of the fortifications are intact, except for a small part which was destroyed in a magazine explosion in 1806.
Cospicua	South Eastern Region	Mostly intact		Main articles: Santa Margherita Lines and Cottonera Lines The fortifications were built by the Order of Saint John in the 17th and 18th centuries. The city was heavily bombed in the Second World War, but its fortifications remain largely intact although they are in need of restoration.
Floriana	South Eastern Region	Mostly intact		Main article: Floriana Lines The area was fortified in the 17th century when the Floriana Lines were built. The walls remain largely intact, although in a rather dilapidated state.
Mdina	Northern Region	Intact		Main article: Fortifications of Mdina The town was first fortified by the Phoenicians, and the current fortifications are based on those built by the Arabs in the 9th to 11th centuries. The fortifications were extensively modified in the Middle Ages, and then by the Order of Saint John until the 18th century. The walls were recently restored, and they are some of the best preserved fortifications in Malta.
Senglea	South Eastern Region	Partly intact		Main article: Fortifications of Senglea The town was fortified in the 1550s by the Order of Saint John. Most of its fortifications including Fort Saint Michael were dismantled in the 19th and 20th centuries, and the walls sustained damage in World War II. However, some still survive to this day, including the impressive seaward bastions and part of the land front.
Valletta	South Eastern Region	Mostly intact		Main article: Fortifications of Valletta The fortifications of Valletta were built by the Order of Saint John between 1566 and 1571, and continued to be modified several times in the following centuries. The City Gate was rebuilt five times, the latest one being completed in 2014. The fortifications of Valletta remain intact, except for a lunette that was demolished in the 19th century and some breaches in the walls.
Victoria	Gozo Region	Intact (Cittadella); Demolished (city walls)		Main article: Cittadella (Gozo) The area was first fortified in the Bronze Age, and was one of the earliest settlements on the Maltese islands. It became the administrative centre of Gozo during Punic-Roman rule. The city of Rabat (now also known as Victoria) was fortified during the Middle Ages, with the acropolis of the Roman city being converted into a castle known as the Cittadella. The city walls were demolished in the 17th century, and at this point the Cittadella was rebuilt by the Order of Saint John. No remains of the city walls survive, but the Cittadella survives intact.

=== Monaco ===
- Monaco

=== Montenegro ===
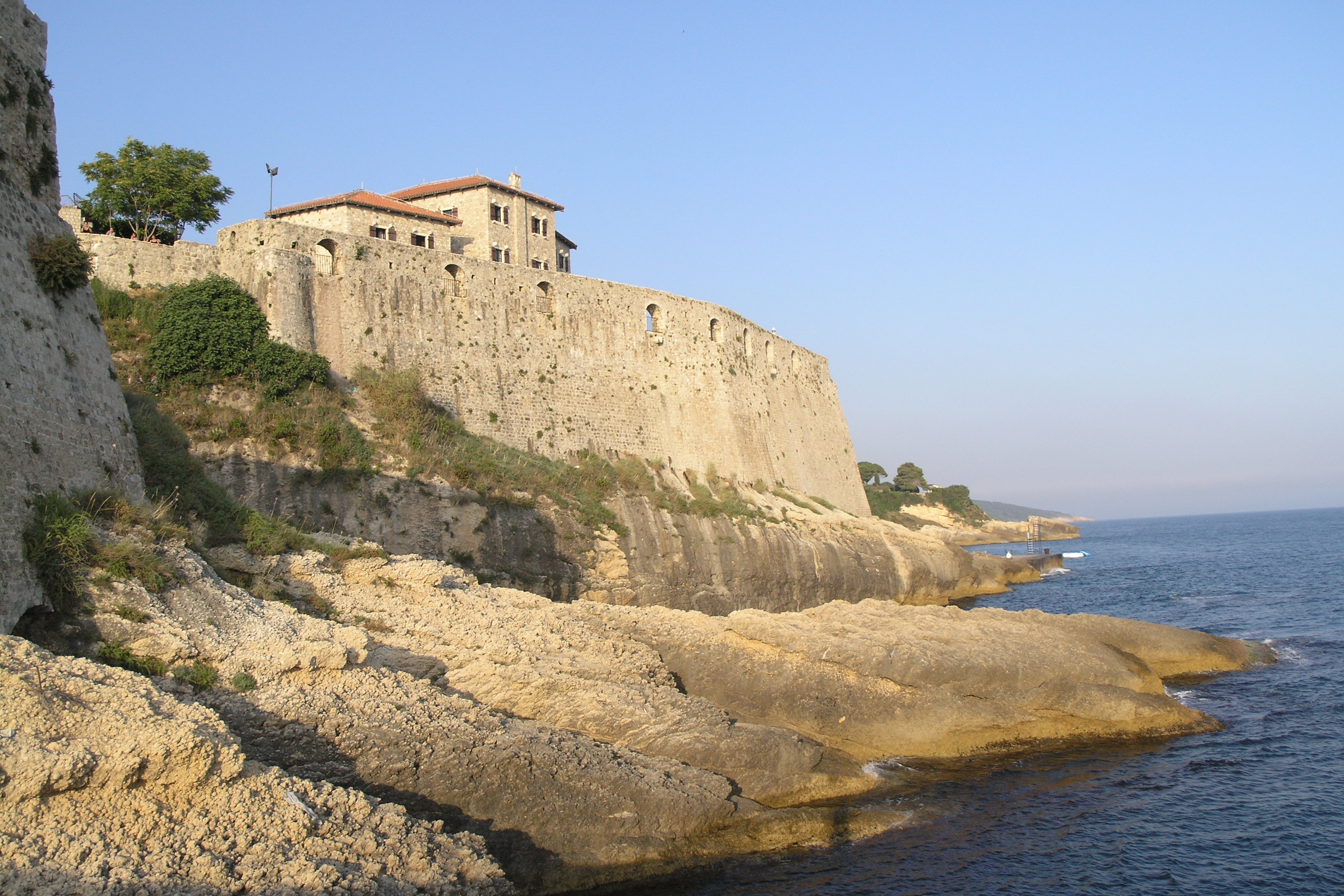
Defensive walls of Kalaja, Ulcinj.

- Kotor
- Bar
- Budva
- Herceg Novi
- Kotor – built by Illyrian tribes in the 9th century and enlarged many times from the 13th century until the 19th century.
- Podgorica
- Sveti Stefan
- Ulcinj

=== Netherlands ===
Place	Province	Accessible	Condition	Image	Notes
's-Hertogenbosch	North Brabant	Yes	Sizable parts of the fortifications remain intact.		Of the first city wall, built in the 13th century, one tower, belonging to one of the city gates, remains incorporated in a house on the Hinthamerstraat. Another remnant of the first city wall is formed by a gate over one of the arms of the Binnendieze River near the Korte Waterstraat. Sizable sections of the second, 13th-century city walls, and 17th- and 18th-century bastions remain intact as they serve as flood prevention measures. Of special note is the 17th-century pentagonal citadel.
Aardenburg	Zeeland		Vestiges of the fortifications are visible in the landscape.		In 1625 AD, a new trace of earthen ramparts was built. These defenses were demolished between 1688 and 1701 AD. One city gate, the Westpoort, survives. Additionally, remnants of bastions, ravelins, and other outworks are clearly distinguishable in the fields surrounding the town. The foundations of a Roman gatehouse with 2 towers can be found at the Burchtstraat. The foundations of a Roman tower are now incorporated in the playground of a local school.
Amersfoort	Utrecht	Yes	Sizable parts of the fortifications remain intact.		Of the first 13th-century city wall, one tower and the barbican of one gate, the Kamperbinnenpoort, remain. After the enlargement of the city in 1450 AD, houses were built on the location of the first wall, and occasionally incorporating fragments of that wall in their structure. Of the 15th-century wall, several stretches remain to the north-east of the old town, while the foundations of the wall have been made visible on the south-eastern side. Two 15th-century gates remain as well; the koppelpoort, a combined land and water gate, and the Monnickendam, a water gate.
Amsterdam	North Holland		One or more individual structures (Bastions, gates, towers, etc.) remain.		Of the medieval walls, the Sint Antoniuspoort is the most important remnant. Other remnants of the same wall are the Schreierstoren and the lower part of one of the towers of the former Regulierspoort. Of the later Baroque defenses, only the Muiderpoort remains intact, while some of the bastions can still be recognizable in the bendy course of the outer moat that still surrounds the old town. The most recent defensive structure around the city is the Stelling van Amsterdam, a 135 km long ring of fortifications around Amsterdam, consisting of 42 forts and other works.
Arnhem	Gelderland		One or more individual structures (Bastions, gates, towers, etc.) remain.		Only the 14th-century Sabelspoort remains.
Asperen	Gelderland		One or more individual structures (Bastions, gates, towers, etc.) remain.		On the side of the Linge River, a stone wall, incorporating the bases of several towers, remains. The water gate, giving access to the old harbor, is partially reconstructed. On the land side, parts of earthen ramparts and moats remain.
Bad Nieuweschans	Groningen		Vestiges of the fortifications are visible in the landscape.		The walls of the tiny fortified village have been partially demolished, although a small section remains.
Bergen op Zoom	North Brabant	Yes	One or more individual structures (Bastions, gates, towers, etc.) remain.		Of the medieval fortifications, only the 14th-century Gevangenpoort remains. Of the extensive 17th-century fortifications, only one single ravelin remains.
Bolsward	Friesland	Yes	One or more individual structures (Bastions, gates, towers, etc.) remain.		A moat still encloses the town center.
Bourtange	Groningen	Yes	The fortifications were recently reconstructed.		The original fortifications were demolished in the 19th century, but have been reconstructed from 1960 onwards, in a successful effort to revitalize the village.
Breda	North Brabant		One or more individual structures (Bastions, gates, towers, etc.) remain.		The only notable remnant of the city walls is the Spanjaardsgat gate; a water gate defended by two multiangular towers. It forms part of the defenses around Breda Castle, which in turn formed an integral part of the city walls.
Bredevoort	Gelderland	Yes	One or more individual structures (Bastions, gates, towers, etc.) remain.		Part of the ramparts, located on the north-east of the town, have been reshaped into a park. To the south-west, a windmill stands on top of a remnant of one of the bastions.
Brielle	South Holland	Yes	The city wall remains intact.		The old town is completely enclosed by earth ramparts, featuring nine bastions, as well as multiple outer works.
Brouwershaven	Zeeland	Yes	One or more individual structures (Bastions, gates, towers, etc.) remain.		Part of the ramparts, located on the east and north of the town, remain intact.
Buren	Gelderland	Yes	Sizable parts of the fortifications remain intact.		On the east side of town, facing the river, an impressive wall remains. On the north-west side of the town, a city gate remains, flanked by a row of houses built against the old town wall.
Culemborg	Gelderland		One or more individual structures (Bastions, gates, towers, etc.) remain.		The old town, its medieval extensions, and the site of the old castle, are still surrounded by a moat. Of the oldest, the 14th-century city wall, one city gate remains, while several fragments of the city wall stand on the south and east sides of the old town.
Delft	South Holland		One or more individual structures (Bastions, gates, towers, etc.) remain.		The old town is for the most part still surrounded by a moat. Along this moat stand two towers belonging to the medieval wall. On the eastern end of the old town stands the Oostpoort, a 15th-century combined land and water gate.
Doesburg	Gelderland	Yes	Sizable parts of the fortifications remain intact.		The fortifications around the old city have been demolished, but the advanced line of defenses to the east of the city remains intact as part of a nature reserve.
Dokkum	Friesland	Yes	The city wall remains intact.		The old city is completely enclosed by a line of earth ramparts, featuring five bastions.
Dordrecht	South Holland		One or more individual structures (Bastions, gates, towers, etc.) remain.		The old city is completely enclosed by a moat, while the old harbor is guarded by the Groothoofdspoort, a late medieval city gate, later rebuilt in a Renaissance style.
Elburg	Gelderland	Yes	Sizable parts of the fortifications remain intact.		The old city is completely enclosed by a moat and a 16th-century rectangular earthen rampart with a bastion at each corner. The rampart was changed into a park in the 19th century, but the defenses are still easily recognizable. Several of the old gates were defended by a barbican, the lower parts of which have been excavated and the casemates of one of the barbicans can be visited. Several sections of the medieval city wall still stand behind the 16th-century rampart. One tower of the medieval wall had been changed into a gate in the 16th century. This structure forms the last remaining city gate of the old town.
Enkhuizen	North Holland	Yes	Sizable parts of the fortifications remain intact.		The landward side of the old town is still completely surrounded by an earthen rampart with five bastions. The last remaining gate facing the landward side of the city is the 17th-century Koepoort. The most impressive remnant of the fortifications is the 16th-century 'Drommedaris' gate, which stands near the harbor.
Franeker	Friesland		One or more individual structures (Bastions, gates, towers, etc.) remain.		The old city is completely enclosed by a moat. The locations of the old bastions and bulwarks are still recognizable in the shape of the moat.
Gennep	Limburg		Sizable parts of the fortifications remain intact.		Lowered remnants of the old city walls surround the west and north sides of the old town.
Geertruidenberg	North Brabant	Yes	Sizable parts of the fortifications remain intact.		Most of the fortifications were demolished, but restored sections of the bastioned trace remains to the north and east sides of the old town.
Goes	Zeeland		One or more individual structures (Bastions, gates, towers, etc.) remain.		The old city is completely enclosed by a moat. The locations of the old bastions and bulwarks are still recognizable in the shape of the moat.
Gorinchem	South Holland	Yes	The city wall remains intact.		The old city is completely enclosed by an intact city wall. To the west of the city, the bastioned trace was demolished in order to accommodate the construction of a canal. The defences on that side were subsequently replaced by a Caponier.
Gouda	South Holland		One or more individual structures (Bastions, gates, towers, etc.) remain.		The old city is completely enclosed by a moat. The remains of a town gate are located near a street named Bogen, meaning 'Arcs', named after the arcs built in the medieval town wall which its trace once ran alongside the Turfsingel side of the street. A part of the town wall is located at the corner Oosthaven with Nieuwe Veerstal. This part of the walls itself once was a part of Gouda castle. Other remains of the castle include subterraneans, cellars and fundaments of walls and towers located in the Houtmanplantsoen, behind the nearby windmill. The lower part of this windmill is a remnant of one of the castle's towers.
Grave	North Brabant		One or more individual structures (Bastions, gates, towers, etc.) remain.		Fragments of the double system of moats remain, as well as one city gate. The lower portions of several round medieval towers can be seen at the old harbor. The water gate, leading down to the river Maas, is a recent reconstruction.
Groenlo	Gelderland	Yes	One or more individual structures (Bastions, gates, towers, etc.) remain.		The old town is partially surrounded by an old moat, which clearly shows the locations of the old bastions. Part of the bastion trace has been reconstructed.
Groningen	Groningen		One or more individual structures (Bastions, gates, towers, etc.) remain.		The old town is surrounded by a moat.
Haarlem	North Holland		One or more individual structures (Bastions, gates, towers, etc.) remain.		The old city centre is still partially surrounded by a moat. To the north of the city, the moat clearly shows the locations of the old bastions, which have been changed into a park. One city gate remains; the 14th-century Amsterdamse Poort.
Hardenberg	Overijssel		Vestiges.		The only remnant of the medieval town walls is a small lower part of a wall at the western end of the Wilhelminaplein, next to an old water pump.
Harderwijk	Gelderland		One or more individual structures (Bastions, gates, towers, etc.) remain.		Several sections of the old medieval wall remains, the most sizable parts being located to the north of the old city, facing the former Zuiderzee. Two gates, the Vischpoort and the Smeepoort, still remain. The Vischpoort has a lighthouse installed on the roof.
Harlingen	Friesland		One or more individual structures (Bastions, gates, towers, etc.) remain.		Several sections of the moat, indicating the presence of three of the old bastions, remain on the east side of the city.
Hasselt	Overijssel		One or more individual structures (Bastions, gates, towers, etc.) remain.		On the landside of the city, remnants of the ramparts, featuring four sizable bastions, remain incorporated in a park.
Hattem	Gelderland		One or more individual structures (Bastions, gates, towers, etc.) remain.		On the landside of the old town center some remnants of the city walls remain. On the side of the old town facing the river IJssel, the Dijkpoort can be found.
Hellevoetsluis	South Holland	Yes	The city wall remains intact.		The old navy harbor is still entirely surrounded by a bastion trace, which is outfitted with a brick revetment on the side of the walls facing the river.
Heukelum	Gelderland		One or more individual structures (Bastions, gates, towers, etc.) remain.		The town is still enclosed by a moat on the three sides facing away from the river Linge.
Heusden	North Brabant		The fortifications were recently reconstructed.		The city walls had been slighted in the 19th century, but have been extensively reconstructed during the middle of the 20th century.
Hoorn	North Holland		One or more individual structures (Bastions, gates, towers, etc.) remain.		The old town is still surrounded by a moat. One city gate remains, the 16th-century Oosterpoort. The most notable remnant of the city defenses, however, is the Hoofdtoren, an impressive 16th-century tower, built to defend the harbor.
Hulst	Zeeland	Yes	The city wall remains intact.		The old town is still surrounded by a rampart and a moat. Several remnants of outer works, such as ravelins and an outer wall, remain.
IJzendijke	Zeeland		One or more individual structures (Bastions, gates, towers, etc.) remain.		Some fragments of the old moat remain. One ravelin belonging to the old fortifications has been restored
IJsselstein	Utrecht		One or more individual structures (Bastions, gates, towers, etc.) remain.		The old moat remains, while some remnants of the town wall remain on the south and east side of the old town.
Kampen	Overijssel		One or more individual structures (Bastions, gates, towers, etc.) remain.		The old moat remains, while the old earthen ramparts remain incorporated in a park. Three medieval city gates remain, two of which have been rebuilt in a renaissance style. The largest gate, the Kroonmarktpoort, retained its medieval appearance.
Klundert	North Brabant	Yes	One or more individual structures (Bastions, gates, towers, etc.) remain.		Several sections of the ramparts and bastions remain intact to the north and south of the old town.
Leerdam	Utrecht	Yes	One or more individual structures (Bastions, gates, towers, etc.) remain.		The city wall remains intact on the side of the town facing the river Linge.
Leeuwarden	Friesland		One or more individual structures (Bastions, gates, towers, etc.) remain.		The old town is still entirely surrounded by a moat. Several bastions to the north of the old town have been changed into a park.
Leiden	South Holland		One or more individual structures (Bastions, gates, towers, etc.) remain.		The old city is still surrounded by a moat. Of the city defenses, two city gates remain and one medieval tower stand to the south of the old town. Part of a bastion on the east side of the city has been reconstructed.
Maastricht	Limburg	Yes	Sizable parts of the fortifications remain intact.		Important parts of all major fortification systems remain intact. Of the first city wall, the Helpoort gate remains, as well as several important sections of the oldest 13th-century city wall. Important parts of the second medieval city wall remain on the east side of the old town, while extensive remnants of the complicated system of baroque fortifications can be found to the north. Additionally, a large network of communication tunnels, casemates, and countermines remain underneath the present outskirts of the city, which were built on top of the old city walls.
Megen	North Brabant		One or more individual structures (Bastions, gates, towers, etc.) remain.		Only a single 14th-century tower, known as the Gevangenpoort, remains.
Middelburg	Zeeland	Yes	One or more individual structures (Bastions, gates, towers, etc.) remain.		The bastioned trace of the city wall has been changed into a park and is still surrounded by a moat. Only one city gate remains, the 18th-century Koepoort.
Montfoort	Utrecht		One or more individual structures (Bastions, gates, towers, etc.) remain.		One of the medieval city gates has been incorporated into the town hall. Another remaining portion of the town wall remains to the south west of the old town.
Muiden	North Holland	Yes	Sizable parts of the fortifications remain intact.		The 16th-century town walls were greatly adapted in the 19th century, when the town became part of the advanced defenses of Amsterdam. The city walls located to the west of the river Vecht remain intact, as do the walls around the Muiderslot castle.
Naarden	North Holland	Yes	The city wall remains intact.		Naarden is one of the best preserved fortified cities in Europe, featuring a double system of moats and walls, built in the 17th century. The inner wall features numerous tunnels, casemates, and barracks.
Nieuwpoort, South Holland	South Holland	Yes	The city wall remains intact.		The tiny town is entirely surrounded by an earth rampart featuring six bastions and a false bray in front of the curtain walls. The town hall is built over a canal running through the center of town and defends a system of locks with which the land surrounding the fortress could be inundated.
Nijmegen	Gelderland		Sizable parts of the fortifications remain intact.		Sizable parts of the medieval city walls remain to the west and east of the old city. The most notable remnant is the wall, and three towers, located in the Kronenburger park. Of the three towers, the Kronenburger tower is arguable one of the most impressive medieval towers in the Netherlands.
Ootmarsum	Overijssel		Vestiges.		The old town is still fully enclosed bij two ringroads, called the Westwal (Western wall) and the Oostwal (Eastern wall), indicating the trace of the medieval walls.
Oudeschans	Groningen	Yes	Sizable parts of the fortifications remain intact.		The walls of the tiny fortified village have been partially demolished, but remain very recognizable. Part of the city walls have subsequently been reconstructed in the 20th century.
Oudewater	Utrecht		One or more individual structures (Bastions, gates, towers, etc.) remain.		The old city is enclosed by a moat. The locations of some of the old bastions and bulwarks are still recognizable in the shape of the moat.
Philippine, Netherlands	Zeeland		Vestiges of the fortifications are visible in the landscape.		Remnants of bastions, ravelins, and other outworks are clearly distinguishable in the fields surrounding the town.
Ravenstein	North Brabant		One or more individual structures (Bastions, gates, towers, etc.) remain.		A moat surrounds much of the old town, clearly showing the location of bastions and ravelins. The remnants of two hornworks are visible to the north and south of the old town. The side of the town facing the river Maas features the remnants of two bastions, excavated from the body of the dyke, as well as the single remaining city gate.
Retranchement	Zeeland	Yes	The city wall remains intact.		Retranchement was built in 1604 AD as an entrenched camp, consisting of two small, square forts, connected by a wall with three bastions. The northern fort no longer exists as it was destroyed in a flood in 1682 AD.
Rhenen	Utrecht		One or more individual structures (Bastions, gates, towers, etc.) remain.		Lowered fragments of the 14th-century city wall can be found to the south of the old town. To the north, a windmill stands on top of a remnant of the wall. On the eastern entrance of the old town, the remnants of a sizable barracane can be found.
Roermond	Limburg		One or more individual structures (Bastions, gates, towers, etc.) remain.		Several fragments of the medieval city wall remain. The most notable and best preserved remnant is the Rattentoren, a 14th-century round tower standing on the north side of the old town.
Sas van Gent	Zeeland		One or more individual structures (Bastions, gates, towers, etc.) remain.		Of the once powerful and strategic fortress, very little remains. Most of the fortifications were demolished in 1930. What remains are the remnants of one bastion, upon which the base of an old windmill stands, and the remnants of an old late 17th-century tidal mill, which was built into the fortifications.
Schiedam	South Holland		One or more individual structures (Bastions, gates, towers, etc.) remain.		Parts of the moat remain, including the northern and western part. The famous Schiedam windmills are built on top of the bases of wall towers.
Schoonhoven	South Holland	Yes	One or more individual structures (Bastions, gates, towers, etc.) remain.		Only a fragment of the old moat remains on the landward side of the town. On the riverside stands the Waterpoort, the last remaining city gate, with some adjacent stretches of the old town walls.
Sittard	Limburg	Yes	Sizable parts of the fortifications remain intact.		The powerful fortress town was destroyed by French forces in 1677 AD. Sizable remnants of the medieval city wall remain, buried underneath a later earthen rampart which still surrounds most of the old town.
Sluis	Zeeland	Yes	The city wall remains intact.		The old town of Sluis was completely destroyed in the second world war, but the extensive fortification system remained intact and can still be visited today.
Sloten	Friesland	Yes	Sizable parts of the fortifications remain intact.		The tiny fortress town of Sloten is still mostly surrounded by its ramparts, while the moat still completely encircles the town. Two water gates remain intact at the places where an old canal dissects the town.
Steenbergen	North Brabant		Vestiges of the fortifications are visible in the landscape.		Some fragments of the old moat remain. The locations of the old bastions can be recognized by the course of the moat and the street pattern. Remnants of the outer works are distinguishable in the surrounding landscape.
Steenwijk	Overijssel	Yes	Sizable parts of the fortifications remain intact.		Sizable parts of the moats and ramparts remain.
Stevensweert	Limburg		Vestiges of the fortifications are visible in the landscape.		Although the walls themselves have been demolished, the town was built as an ideal fortress, and features the characteristic spider web street pattern that many such towns were built with. Part of the city walls have been reconstructed from 2007 AD onwards.
Tholen	Zeeland	Yes	One or more individual structures (Bastions, gates, towers, etc.) remain.		The ramparts were changed into a park, but the moat is still present and four bastions are still recognizable.
Tiel	Gelderland		One or more individual structures (Bastions, gates, towers, etc.) remain.		Fragments of the moat remain, as well as one city gate.
Utrecht	Utrecht	Yes	One or more individual structures (Bastions, gates, towers, etc.) remain.		The medieval city wall has been completely demolished. Remnants of three of the 16th-century Italian style bastions remain. The most complete bastion is Sonnenborgh. Most of the old city fortifications were changed into an English style landscape park in the 19th century. The Dutch Water Line forms a double ring of fortresses where it passes east of the city.
Valkenburg aan de Geul	Limburg		One or more individual structures (Bastions, gates, towers, etc.) remain.		Two city gates remain at the foot of the ruined castle. Part of the city wall remains to the west side of the old town. The small Den Halder castle was built around an old tower of the city wall.
Veere	Zeeland	Yes	Sizable parts of the fortifications remain intact.		The Campveerse toren is a large medieval tower that still guards the entrance to the old harbor today. The later earth ramparts remain mostly intact, especially the enlargements built by order of Napoleon
Venlo	Limburg		One or more individual structures (Bastions, gates, towers, etc.) remain.		Nearly nothing remains of the once extensive fortifications of Venlo. The most extensive remnant being a stretch of 14th-century wall known as the "Luif"
Vianen	Utrecht		One or more individual structures (Bastions, gates, towers, etc.) remain.		The Lekpoort is the last remaining city gate of the little town of Vianen. Apart from the gate, a large part of the town is still enclosed by a moat, while a sizable length of (lowered) city wall still stands on the south side of the town.
Vlissingen	Zeeland	Yes	One or more individual structures (Bastions, gates, towers, etc.) remain.		Several remnants of bastions, curtain walls and a tower of a medieval city gate, still stand on the waterside. The landward facing defenses have all been demolished.
Wageningen	Gelderland		One or more individual structures (Bastions, gates, towers, etc.) remain.		The foundations of a small stretch of the medieval city wall have been unearthed and restored. Of the later ramparts, the moat remains, its trace clearly showing the locations of the old bastions.
Weesp	North Holland	Yes	The city wall remains intact.		Only four of the planned eight bastions were constructed. All four remain intact and surrounded by a moat. In the 19th century, a circular fort was constructed on an island in the river Vecht.
Willemstad	North Brabant	Yes	The city wall remains intact.		In 1583 AD, prince William of Orange orders the construction of a fortified city on the location of the village of Ruigenhil. The city, called Willemstad, is still entirely surrounded by its seven sided city wall.
Wijk bij Duurstede	Utrecht		One or more individual structures (Bastions, gates, towers, etc.) remain.		A portion of the moat remains, as do several fragments of the city wall facing the riverside. One city gate still stands as a windmill has been built on top of it. The ramparts that surround the ruins of Duurstede castle have been reshaped into a landscape style park.
Woerden	Utrecht	Yes	One or more individual structures (Bastions, gates, towers, etc.) remain.		Sizable sections of the inner and outer moats still remain and several of the bastions are still recognizable as such. The medieval castle still stands on the south eastern side of the old town.
Woudrichem	North Brabant	Yes	The city wall remains intact.		The city received a set of strong ramparts with seven bastions in 1580 AD. Only one of the gates, the Gevangenpoort, now remains
Zaltbommel	Gelderland	Yes	Sizable parts of the fortifications remain intact.		The earthen ramparts and its bastions were made into an English landscape park in the 19th century, but the structures remain intact up to a significant height and are easily recognizable. The outer moat still encloses the landward side of the city. Behind the earthen ramparts stand several sizable fragments of the medieval city wall.
Zierikzee	Zeeland	Yes	One or more individual structures (Bastions, gates, towers, etc.) remain.		A moat still surrounds the old town. While the walls have been demolished, three medieval gates remain. Of these gates, the ensemble of the Noordhavenpoort and Zuidhavenpoort, which guard the entrance to the old harbor, form one of the most impressive remaining medieval defensive structures in the Netherlands
Zutphen	Gelderland		One or more individual structures (Bastions, gates, towers, etc.) remain.		Remnants of moats from the medieval and post-medieval fortifications are still visible around the old town. The remnants of the medieval fortifications include several towers, the impressive Drogenapstoren gate, the Bourgonjetoren bastion, a water gate named Berkel gate, and a sizable stretch of the old city wall to the south of the old town.
Zwolle	Overijssel		One or more individual structures (Bastions, gates, towers, etc.) remain.		The moat, still clearly showing the remnants of the old bastions, still encloses the old town. The Sassenpoort is the sole remaining city gate, but is one of the largest and most impressive gates of the Netherlands. A number of fragments of the medieval city wall, including two strong towers, still stand along the waterside of the Thorbeckegracht

=== Norway ===
- Fredrikstad
- Gamlebyen
- Oslo (Akershus Fortress)

=== Poland ===
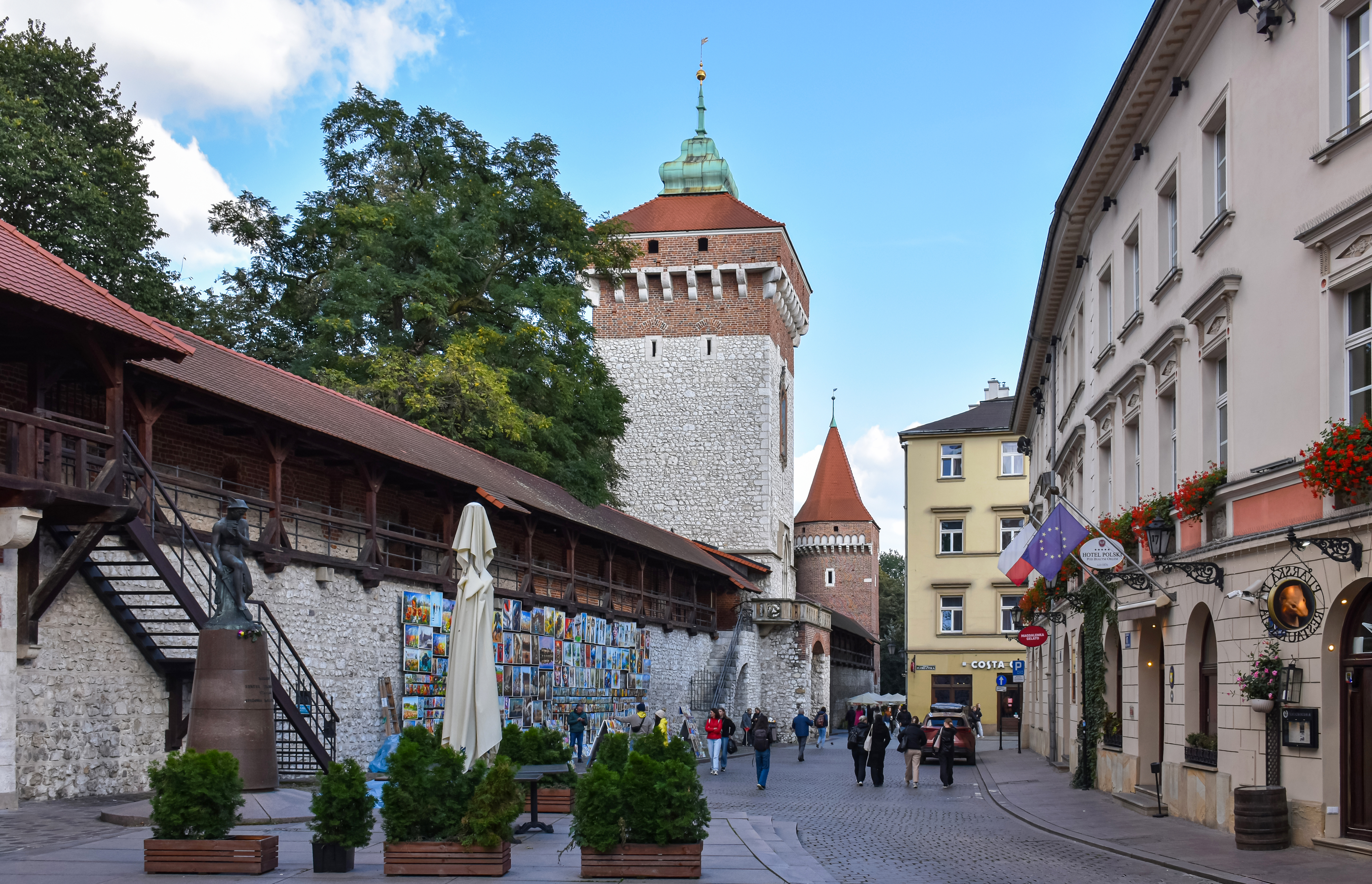
City walls in Kraków

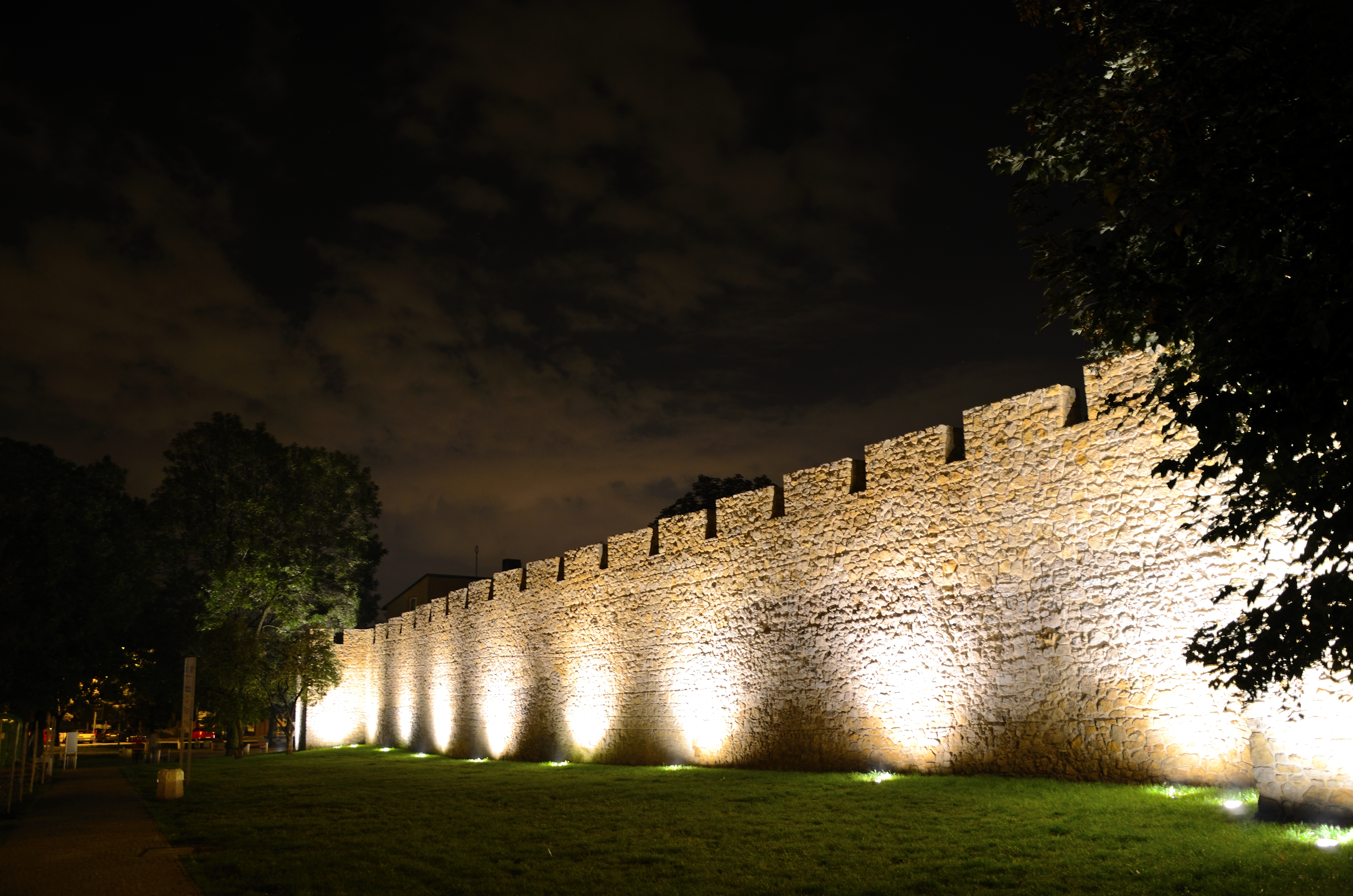
City walls in Będzin

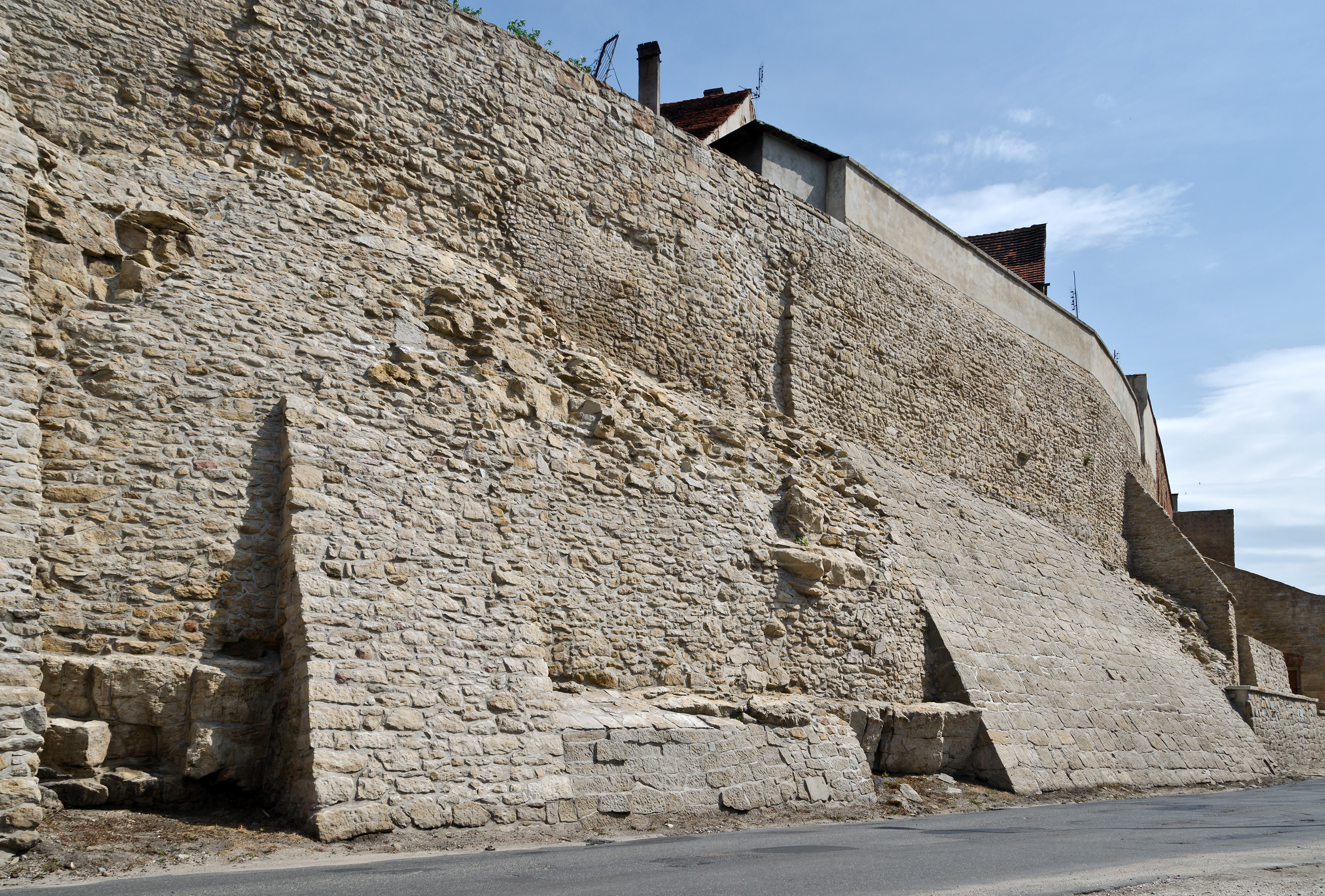
City walls in Bystrzyca Kłodzka

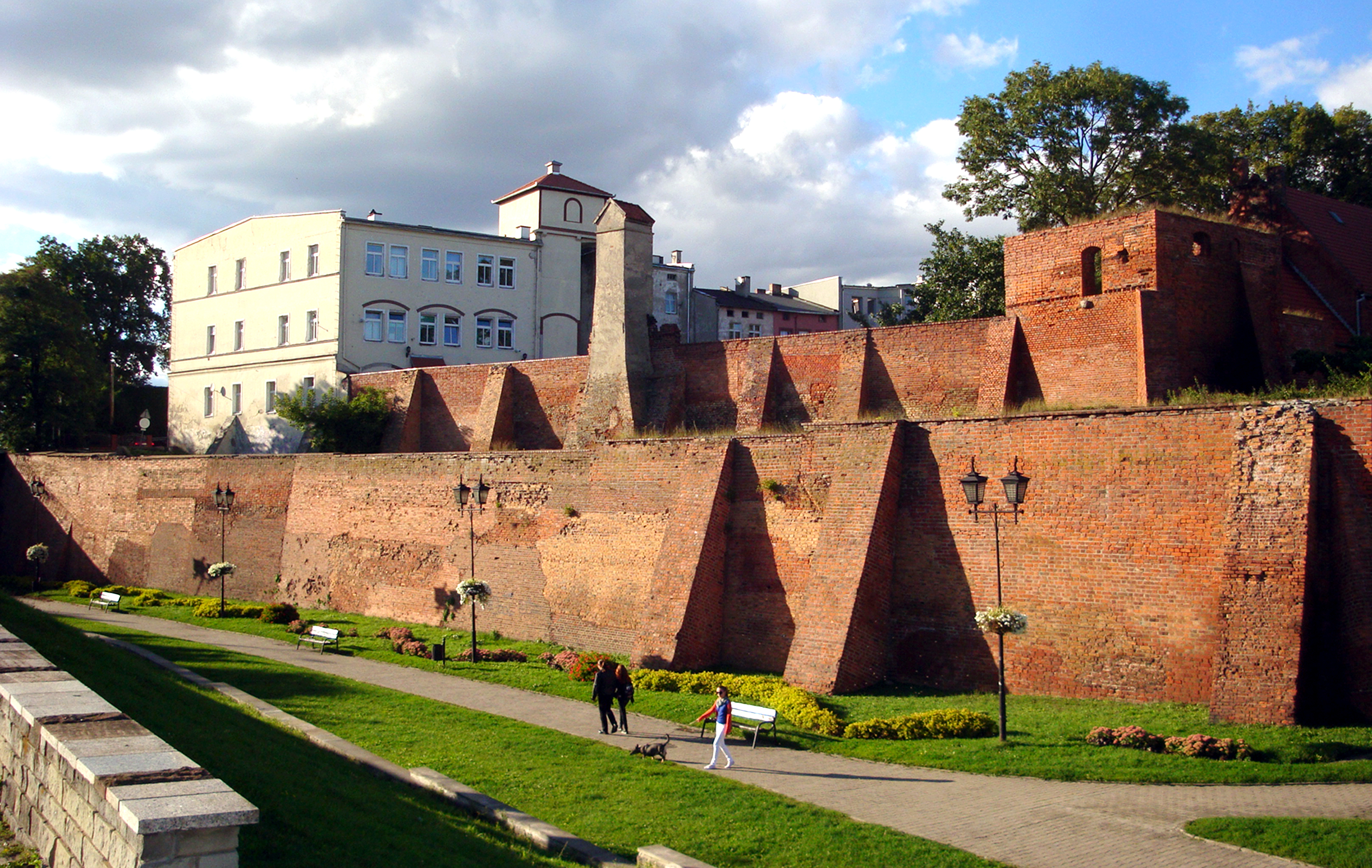
City walls in Grudziądz

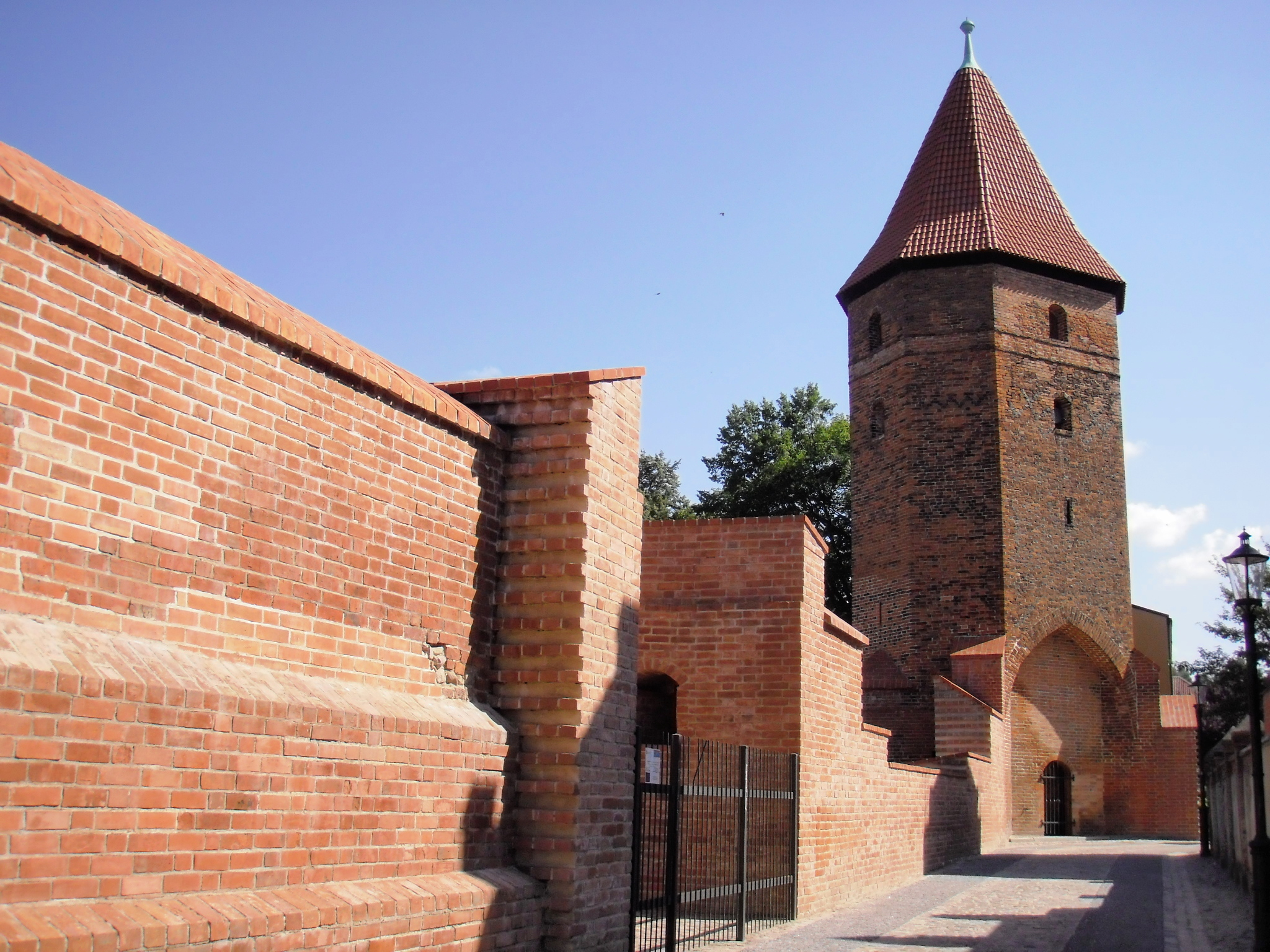
City walls in Lębork

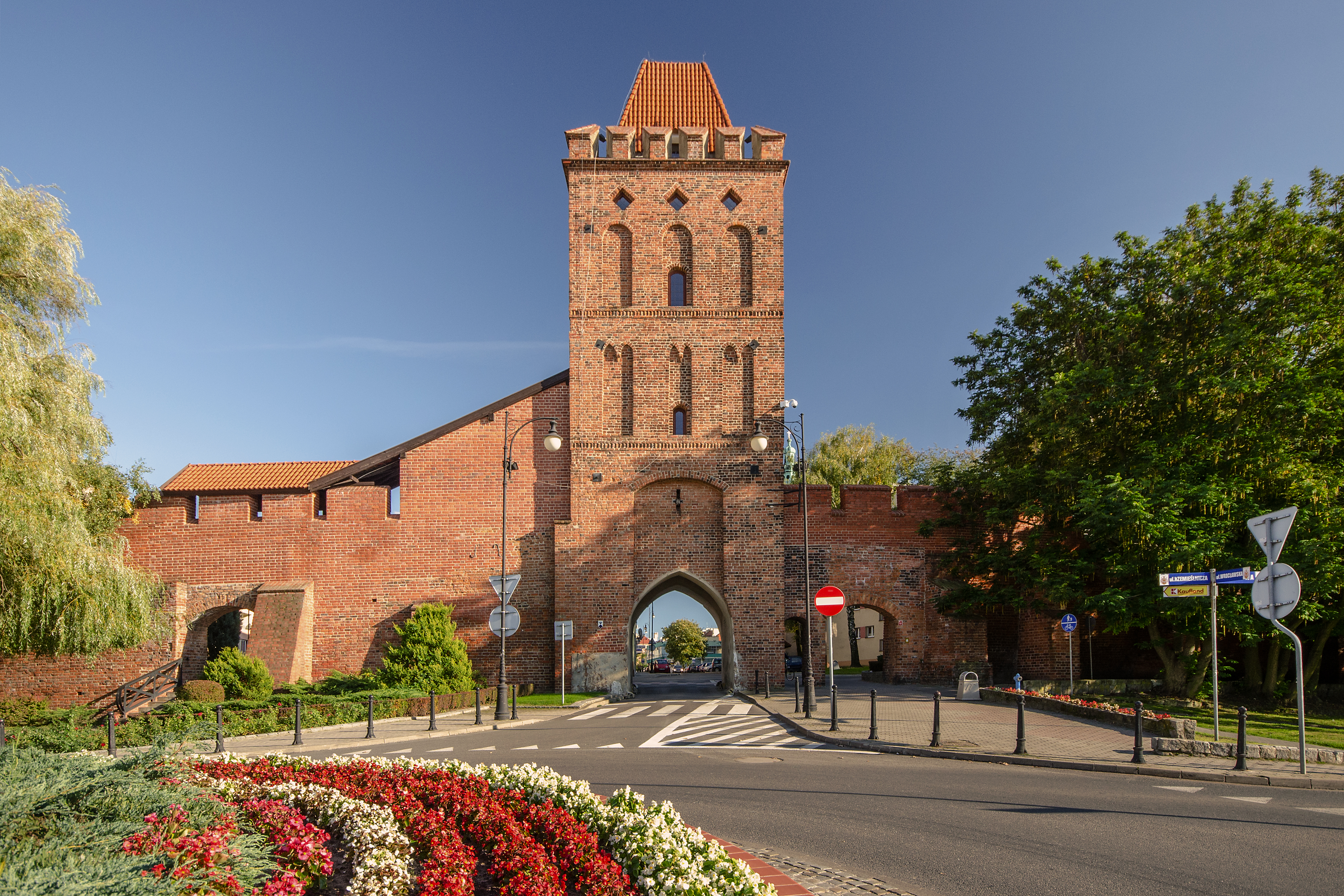
City walls in Oleśnica

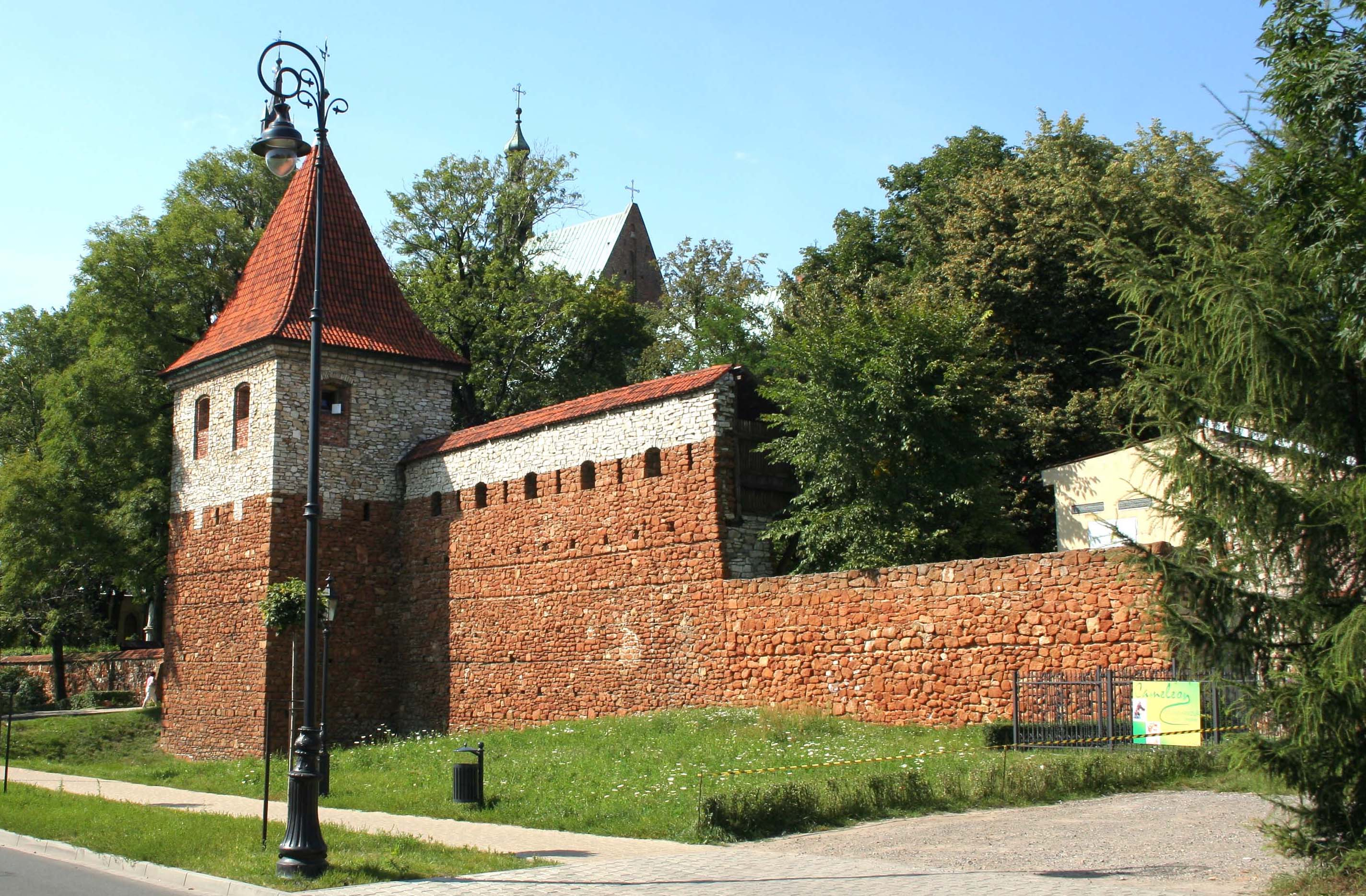
City walls in Olkusz

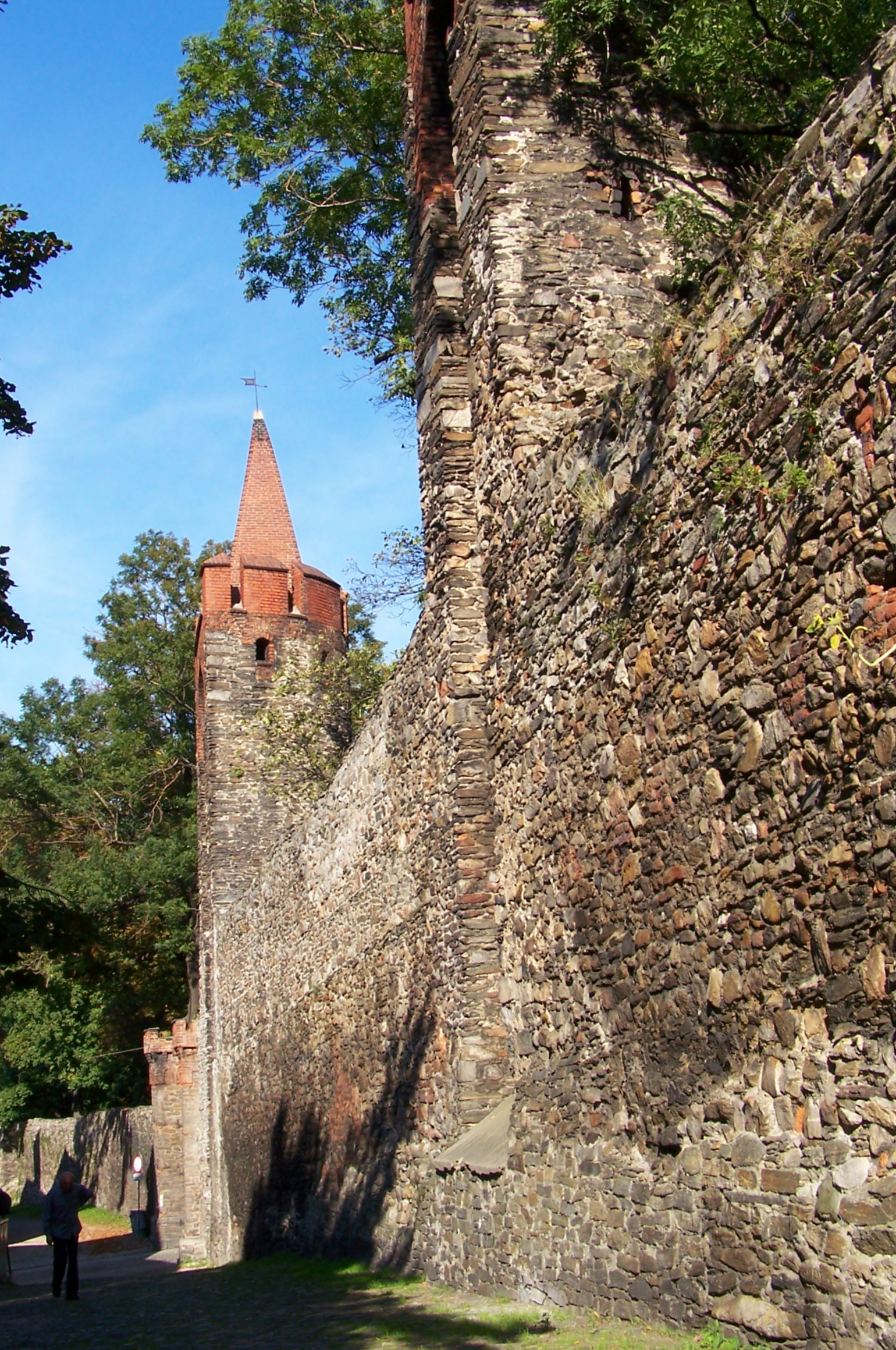
City walls in Paczków

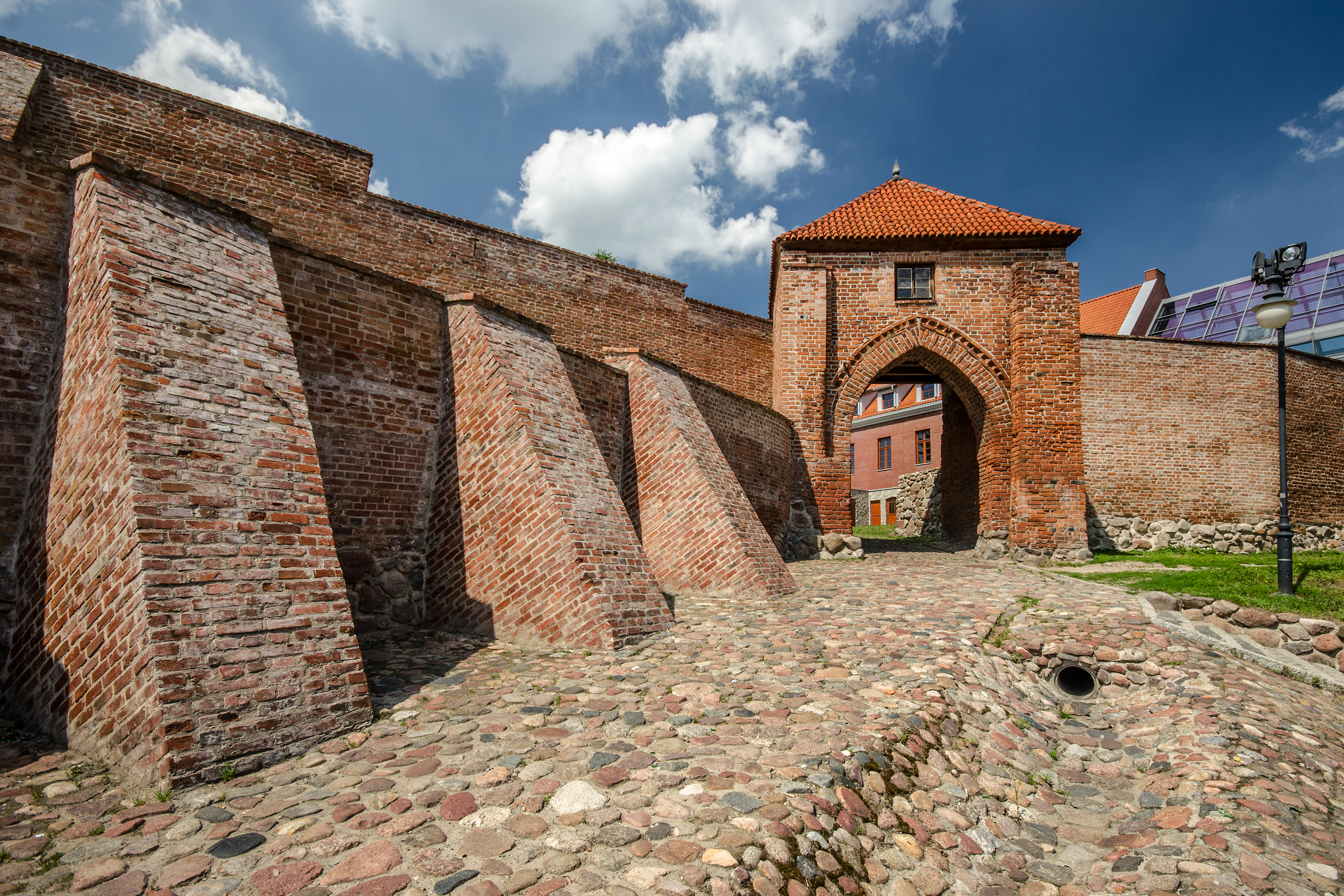
City walls in Pasłęk

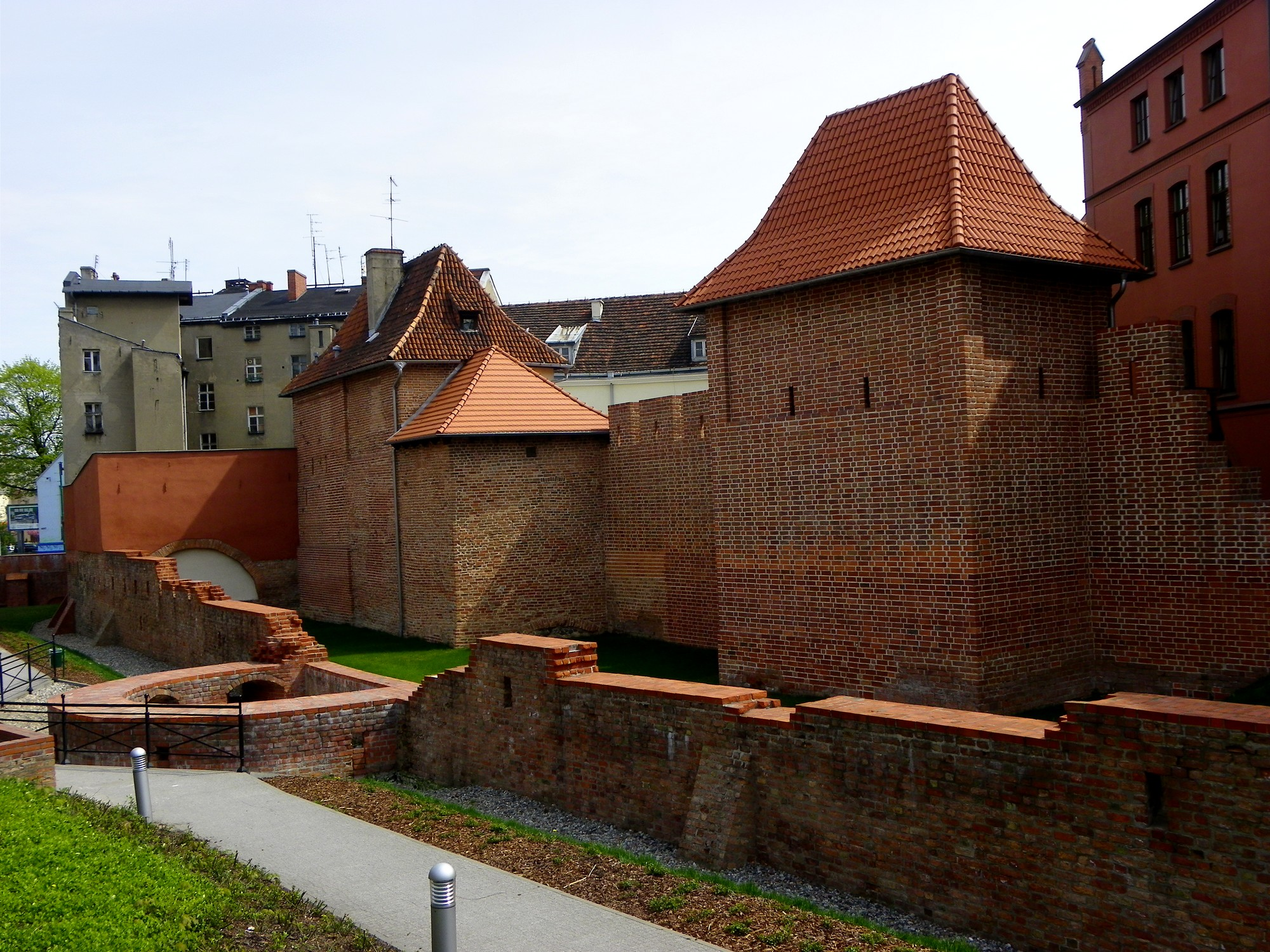
City walls in Poznań

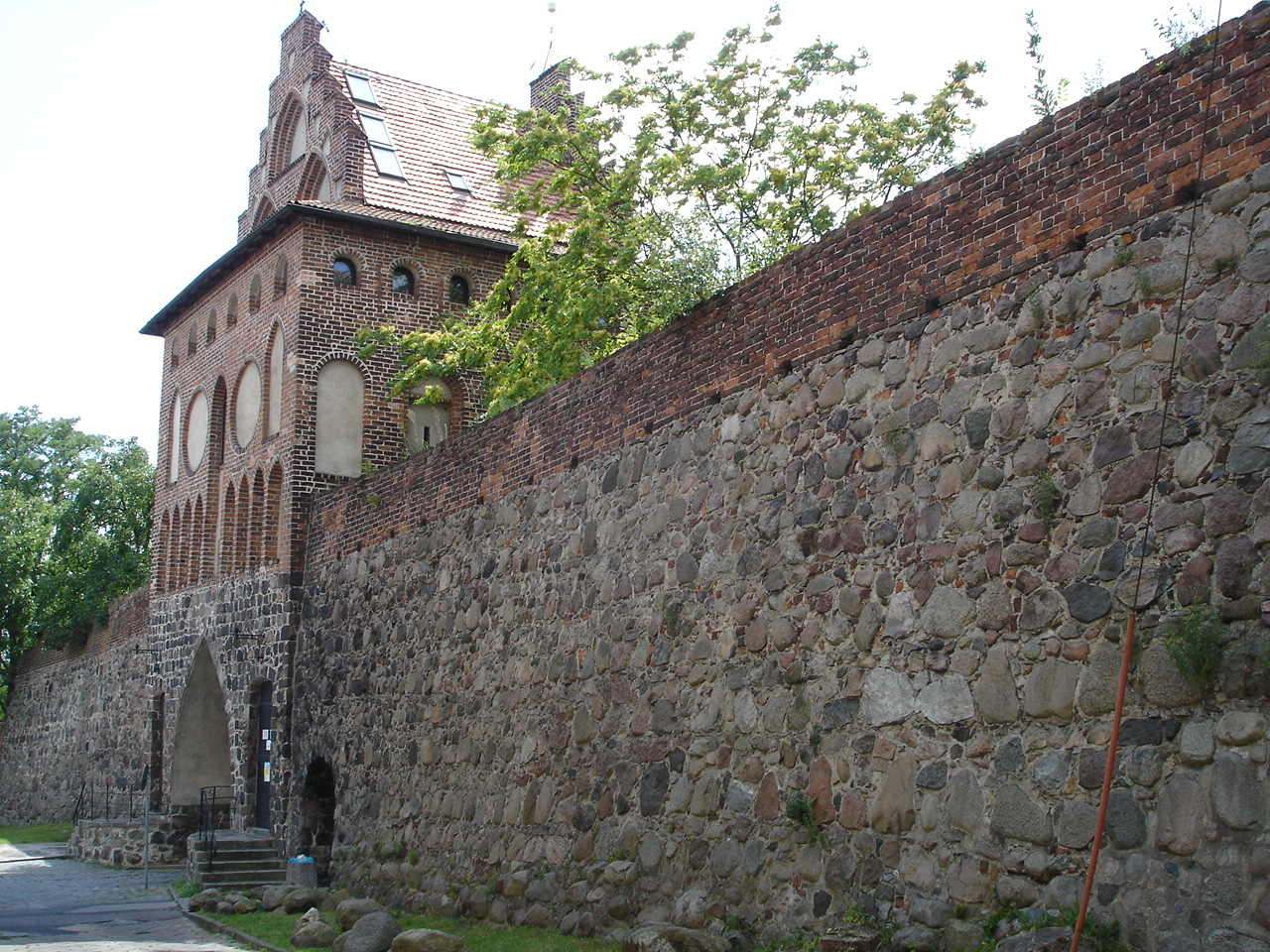
City walls in Stargard

- Barczewo – remnants.
- Będzin – partially preserved.
- Biała
- Białogard – partially preserved with a medieval gate.
- Bierutów – largely preserved.
- Biskupiec – partially preserved.
- Bolesławiec – the old town has fragmentary remains of the old town wall, including several towers and stretches of wall.
- Bolków – remnants.
- Braniewo
- Brodnica – partially preserved.
- Brzeg – a star-shaped park around the old town is what remains of the renaissance fortifications. Some parts of the moat still remain. The shape of seven bastions is recognizable from the air.
- Byczyna – partially preserved.
- Bystrzyca Kłodzka – largely preserved with a medieval gate and two towers.
- Chełmno – almost whole length of walls (2.2 km), with 17 watch towers and city gate, 13th and 14th centuries.
- Chojna – partially preserved with two medieval gates.
- Chojnice
- Chojnów – partially preserved with a tower.
- Darłowo – partially preserved with a medieval gate.
- Dąbrówno – partially preserved.
- Debrzno – partially preserved.
- Dobre Miasto – partially preserved with a medieval tower.
- Drawsko Pomorskie – remnants.
- Dzierżoniów – mostly preserved.
- Gdańsk – partly preserved defensive walls, listed with the historic city center as a Historic Monument of Poland.
- Głogów
- Głubczyce – partially preserved.
- Gniew
- Goleniów
- Golub-Dobrzyń
- Gorzów Wielkopolski
- Góra – partially preserved.
- Grodków
- Grudziądz
- Gryfice
- Gryfino
- Gryfów Śląski – partially preserved.
- Gubin – partially preserved.
- Iława – partially preserved.
- Ińsko – remnants.
- Jawor – partially preserved with two medieval towers.
- Jelenia Góra – partially preserved with medieval towers.
- Jeziorany – remnants.
- Kalisz – partially preserved with a tower.
- Kamienna Góra – partially preserved.
- Kamień Pomorski – partially preserved with a medieval gate.
- Kąty Wrocławskie – partially preserved.
- Kętrzyn – partially preserved.
- Kluczbork – partially preserved.
- Kłodzko – the remains include the impressive citadel located on a hill north of the medieval town.
- Kołobrzeg – a round basion and a part of the moat still remain.
- Kostrzyn nad Odrą – the medieval town was entirely destroyed during World War II, only remaining some ruins of houses, the ruins of a church and the riverside fortified walls. The fortified walls include three bastions and a land gate. The remaining moat of an outer work is located north west of the ruined medieval town.
- Koszalin – remnants.
- Kościan – partially preserved.
- Kowalewo Pomorskie
- Kożuchów
- Kraków – only the barbican, Floriańska Gate, two watch towers and some traces preserved. Along with the historic city center listed as a UNESCO World Heritage Site and Historic Monument of Poland.
- Krapkowice
- Kwidzyn
- Legnica – partially preserved with a medieval gate.
- Lębork – partially preserved
- Lidzbark Warmiński
- Lipiany – partially preserved with two medieval gates.
- Lubań – partially preserved with a medieval gate.
- Lubawa – partially preserved.
- Lubin – partially preserved with a gate and towers.
- Lublin
- Lubomierz – partially preserved.
- Lwówek Śląski – largely preserved.
- Malbork – one gate and a round bastion still remain. Stretches of the walls still remain alongside the river in the direction of the famous Malbork Castle
- Maszewo – the town walls are nearly complete, apart from two breaches made for the increasing traffic. The two original town gates are demolished, and an adjacent tower of one of the gates still remains.
- Mieszkowice
- Miłakowo – partially preserved.
- Morąg – partially preserved.
- Moryń
- Myślibórz
- Namysłów
- Nidzica – partially preserved.
- Niemcza – partially preserved.
- Nowe – sizable parts of the walls remain.
- Nowe Miasto Lubawskie – partially preserved with two medieval town gates.
- Nowogard – partially preserved.
- Nowogrodziec – largely preserved.
- Nysa – there are large remains of the renaissance fortifications, notably to the east of the old town and to the north of the Nysa Klodzka river. There are several forts around Nysa. The remains of the medieval town walls include two land gates, the remains of a water gate, some towers and stretches of wall.
- Oleśnica – largely preserved.
- Olkusz
- Olsztyn – partially preserved with a medieval gate.
- Opole – the remaining walls are located in the north east corner of the medieval town.
- Orneta – partially preserved.
- Ostróda – remnants.
- Ośno Lubuskie – largely preserved medieval town walls with several gates and towers.
- Paczków – very well preserved walls with 19 towers and 3 gates; listed with the Old Town as a Historic Monument of Poland.
- Pasłęk – large stretches of the walls remain intact, including two city gates
- Pasym – partially preserved.
- Piotrków Trybunalski – partially preserved.
- Płock – remnants with medieval tower.
- Poznań – city walls existed until the early 19th century (fragments remain); Prussian fortifications were built in the 19th century. Remaining parts are listed along with the Old Town as a Historic Monument of Poland.
- Prabuty
- Prochowice – remnants.
- Prudnik – three watch towers
- Przemyśl – partially preserved ruins
- Przeworsk – partially preserved.
- Pyrzyce – largely preserved with several gates and towers; until World War II best preserved city walls in Pomerania region, from the 14th century
- Radków – partially preserved.
- Recz – partially preserved with two medieval towers.
- Reszel – partially preserved with a medieval tower.
- Sandomierz
- Sępopol – partially preserved with a medieval tower.
- Skarszewy – partially preserved.
- Słupsk – partially preserved.
- Stargard – significant parts survived with 3 gates (including a unique water gate – Brama Młyńska); one of the most interesting city walls in Poland; listed as a Historic Monument of Poland
- Starogard Gdański
- Strzegom – partially preserved with a medieval tower.

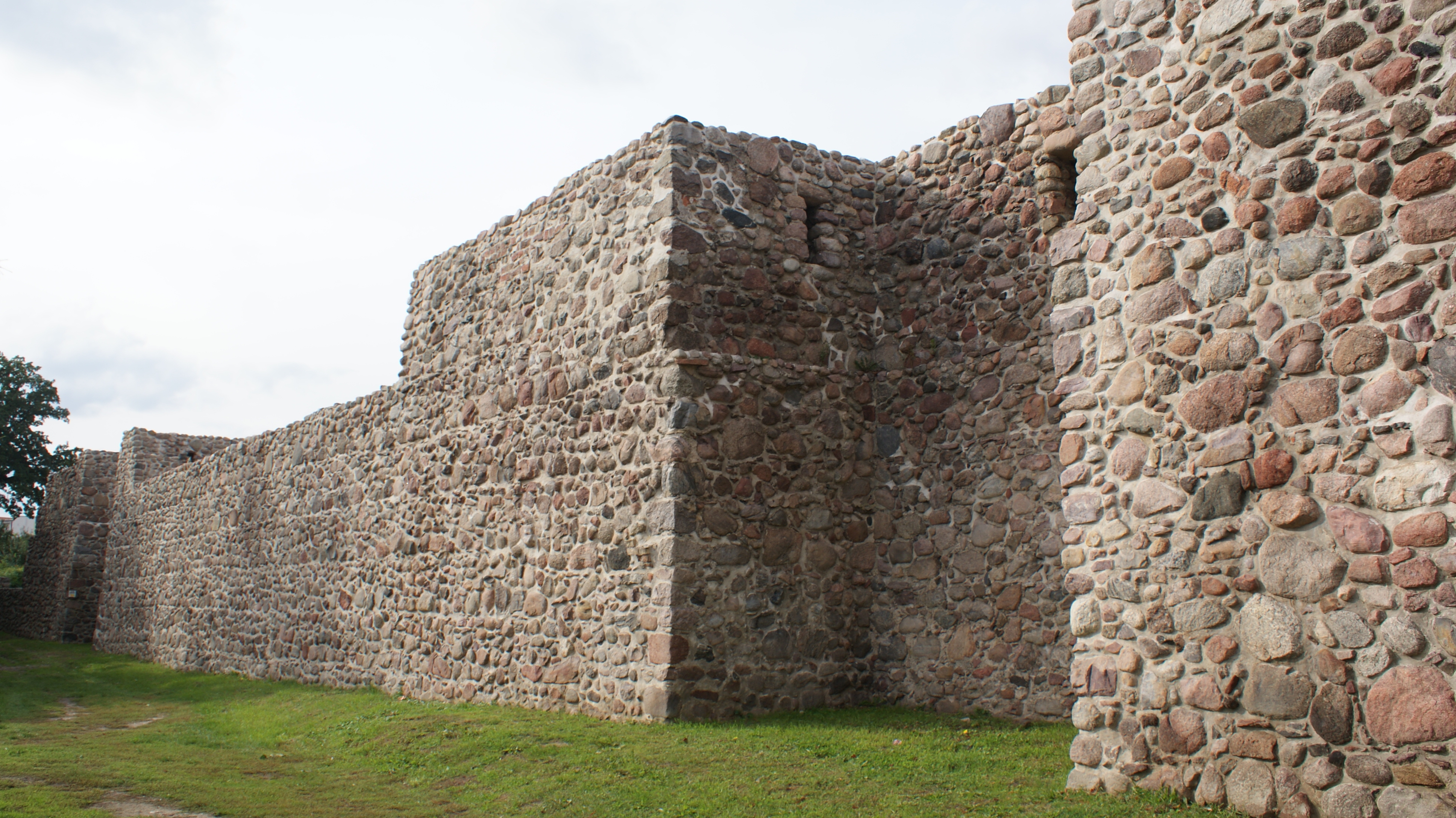
City walls in Strzelce Krajeńskie

- Strzelce Krajeńskie
- Strzelce Opolskie – partially preserved.
- Strzelin – partially preserved.
- Sulechów
- Susz – partially preserved.
- Syców – partially preserved with a tower.
- Szczecin – to the east of the castle remains a well-preserved wall tower. Two town gates still remain.
- Szprotawa

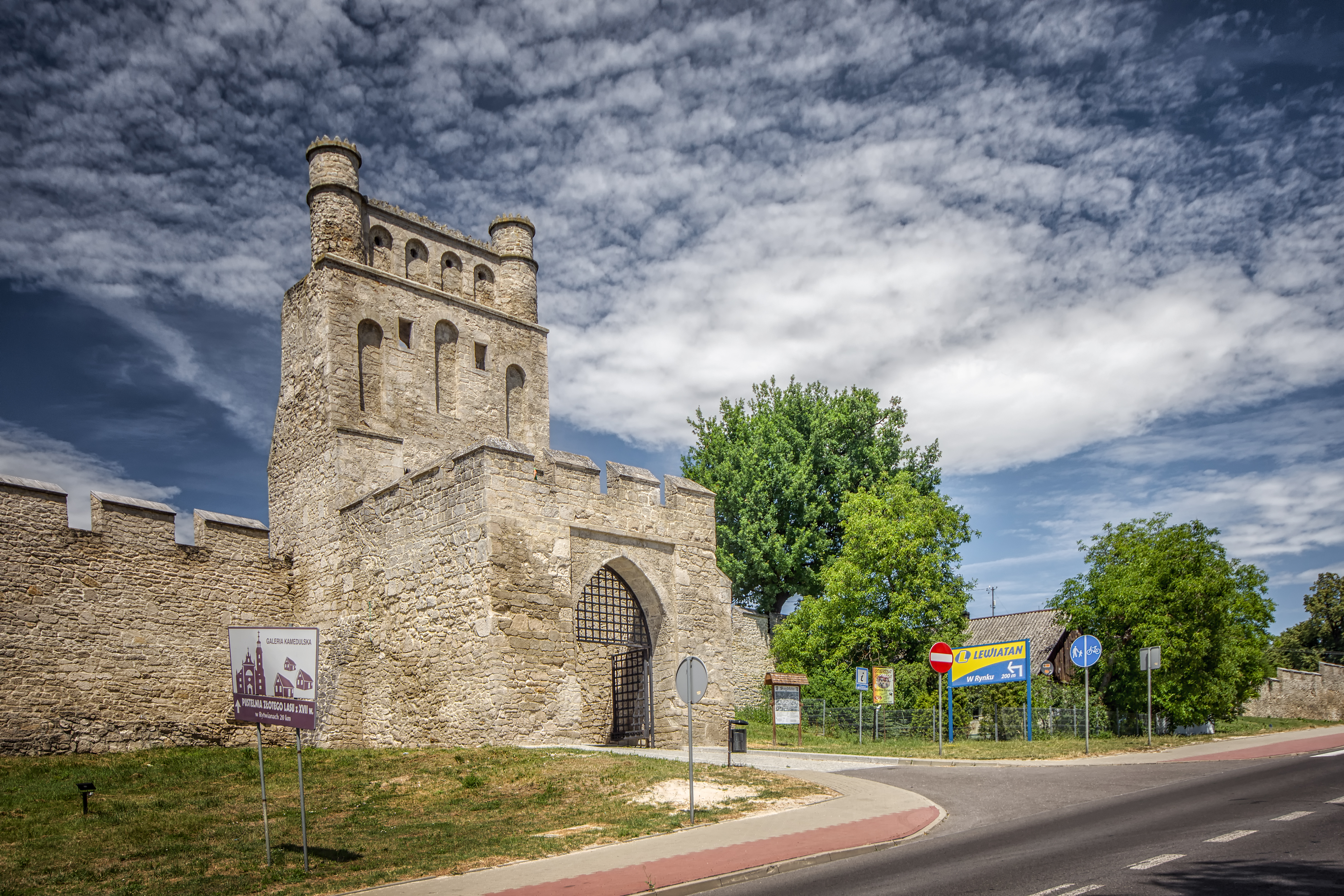
City walls in Szydłów

- Szydłów – city walls with Krakowska Gate and watch towers built in the 14th century
- Ścinawa – partially preserved.
- Środa Śląska
- Świdnica – partially preserved with a medieval gate and tower.
- Świdwin – partially preserved with a medieval gate.
- Świebodzice – partially preserved.
- Świebodzin
- Świecie
- Tarnów
- Tczew – partially preserved.
- Tolkmicko – preserved tower.

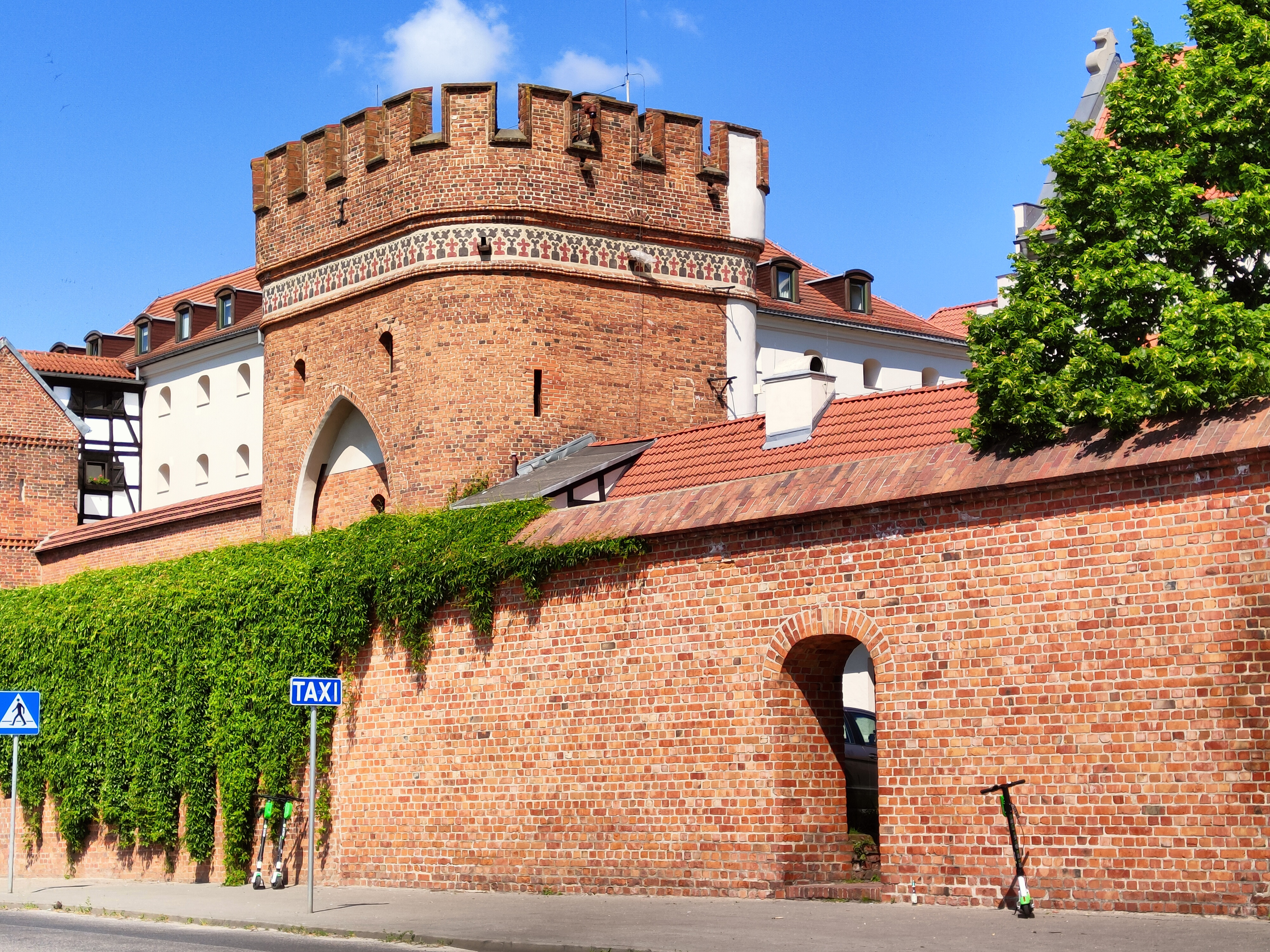
City walls in Toruń

- Toruń – several watch towers, three city gates and some sections (the longest and most impressive from Vistula) from the 13th to 15th centuries. Along with the historic city center listed as a UNESCO World Heritage Site and Historic Monument of Poland.
- Trzcińsko-Zdrój
- Trzebiatów

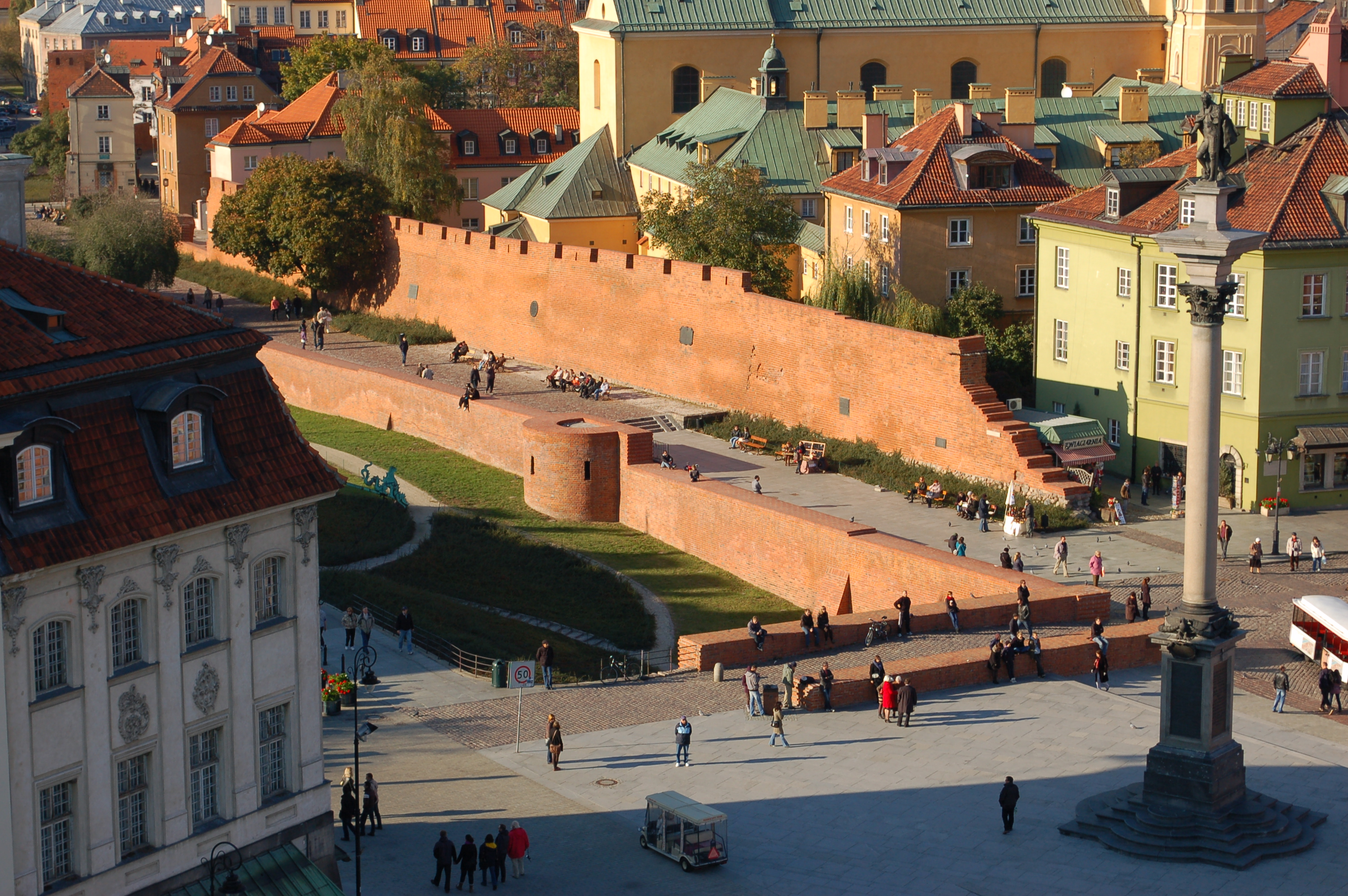
City walls in Warsaw

- Warsaw – partially preserved, partially restored after World War II, barbican restored. Along with the historic city center listed as a UNESCO World Heritage Site and Historic Monument of Poland.
- Wieluń
- Wińsko – partially preserved.
- Wolin – only one bastion remains to the south of the town.
- Wołów – partially preserved.
- Wrocław – partially preserved with a medieval tower.
- Zalewo – partially preserved with a medieval tower.
- Zamość – complete renaissance and 19th-century walls preserved
- Ząbkowice Śląskie
- Ziębice – partially preserved with a medieval gate.
- Złotoryja – partially preserved with a medieval tower.
- Żagań
- Żary – partially preserved.
- Żory – partially preserved.

=== Portugal ===
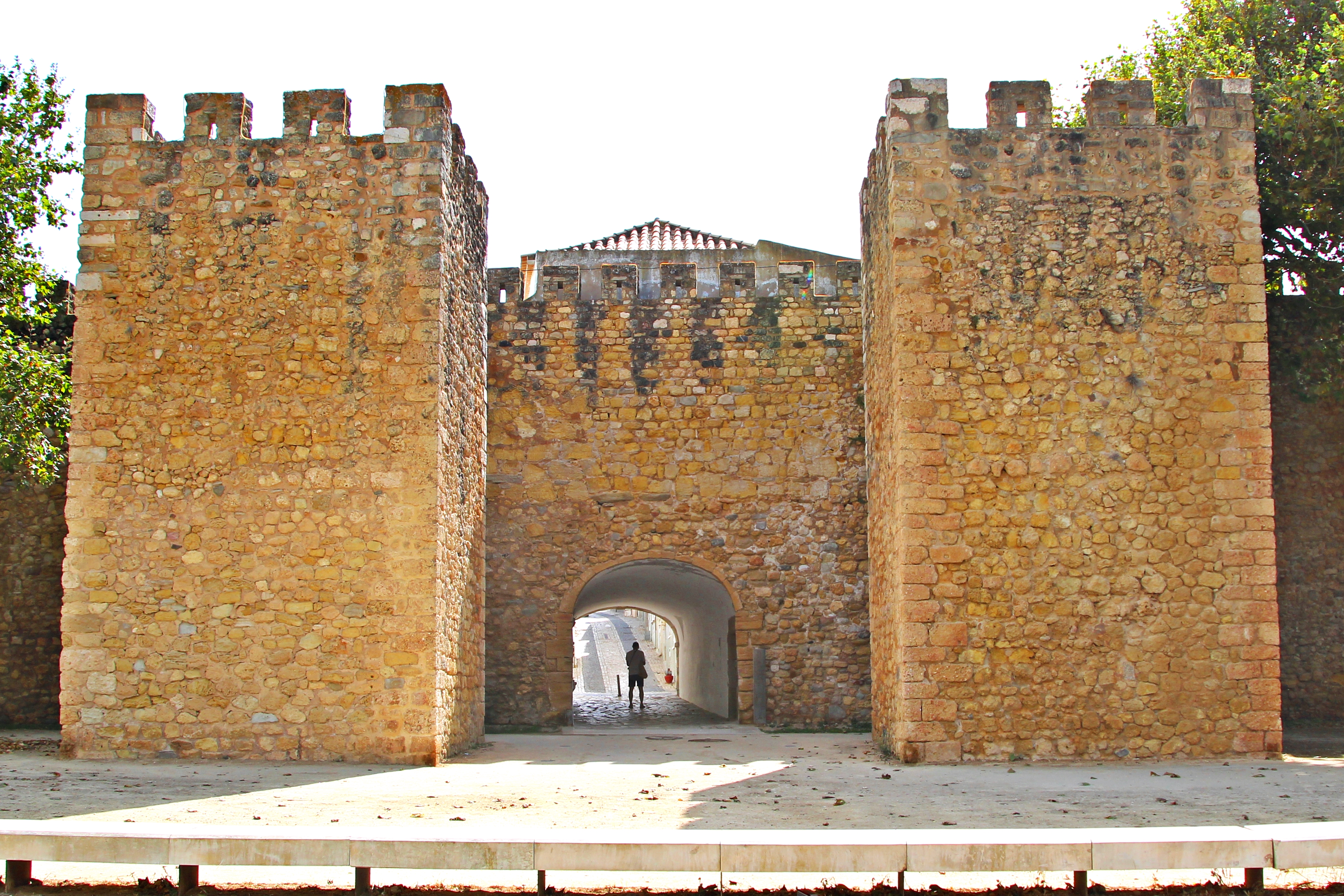
Defensive walls of Lagos

- Almeida Vauban style fortress town.
- Avis (or Aviz)
- Beja
- Borba - The medieval castle is in the centre of the present town. Most of the walls are still visible (in some parts integrated on actual houses); the main gate is a main presence in the central square.
- Bragança – the old town is still completely surrounded with medieval walls, including all 12 towers and two gates.
- Caminha
- Castelo Branco
- Castelo de Vide
- Chaves
- Coimbra
- Elvas – Elvas is among the finest examples of intensive usage of the trace italienne (star fort) in military architecture.
- Estremoz
- Évora
- Guarda
- Guimarães
- Lagos
- Lisbon – There are fragments of a Fernandin Wall since the 13th century.
- Marvão
- Monção
- Monsaraz
- Monforte
- Óbidos
- Olivenza
- Peniche
- Santarém
- Setúbal – the remains of 5 bastions can be found around town.
- Valença
- Vide e Cabeça
- Vila Viçosa

=== Romania ===
- Alba Iulia
- Bistriţa
- Brașov
- Cluj-Napoca
- Constanța
- Mediaș
- Oradea
- Orăștie
- Sebeș
- Sibiu
- Sighișoara
- Timișoara

=== Russia ===
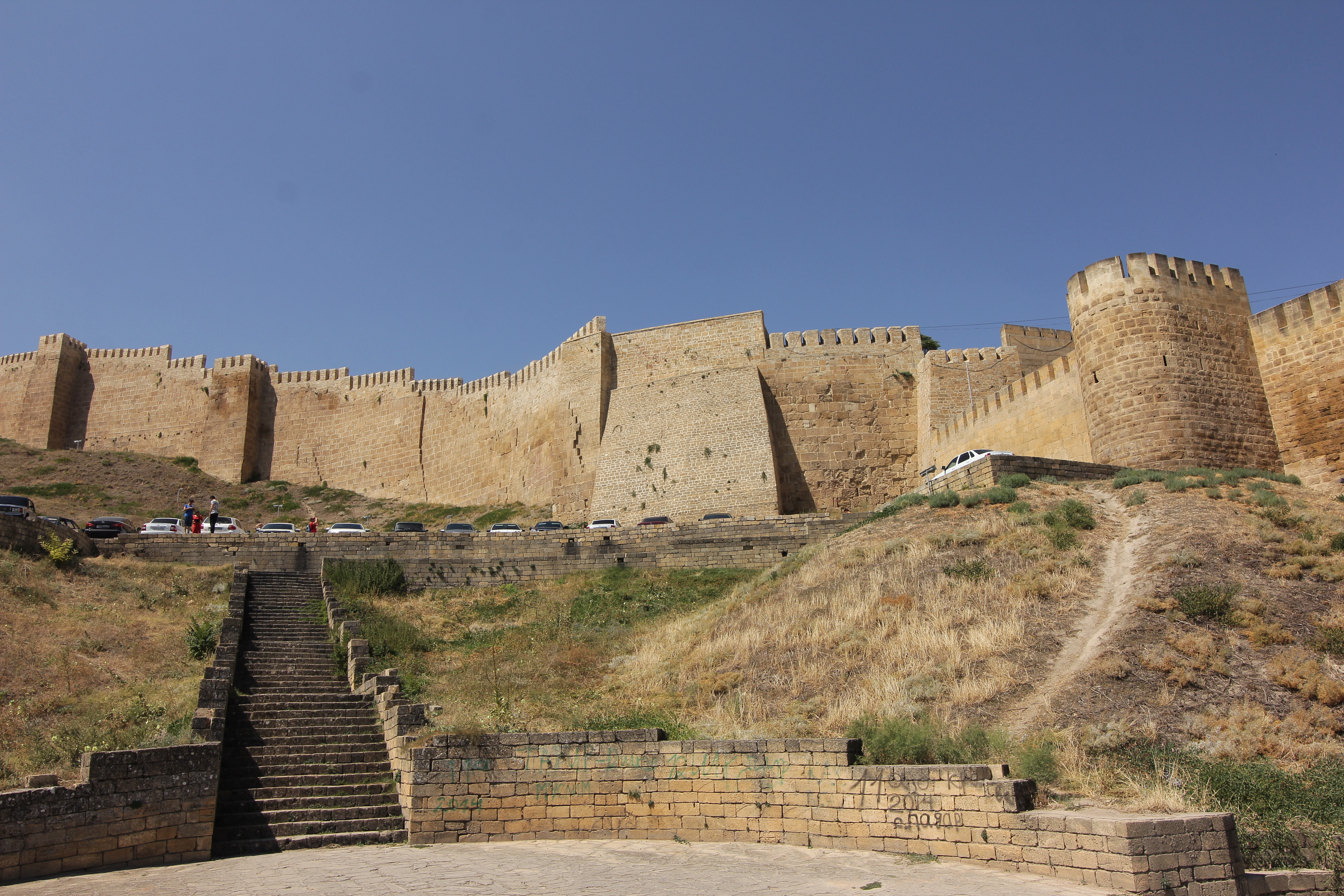
Sasanian fortress in Derbent

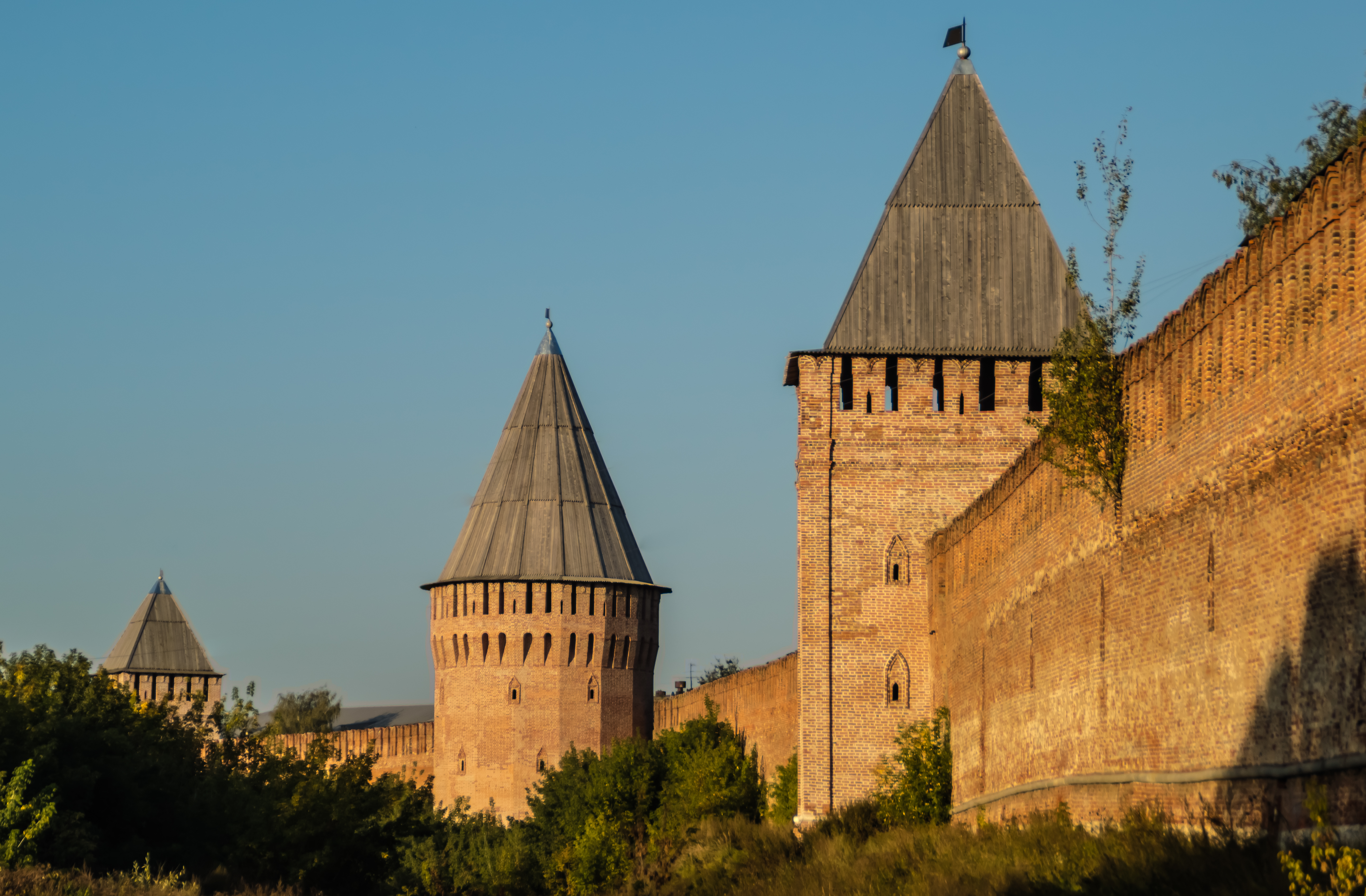
Smolensk city wall from the 16th century

City walls

- Derbent (a World Heritage site)
- Izborsk
- Moscow (the walls of the Bely Gorod have been dismantled, the Kitay-gorod wall for the most part too)
- Pskov
- Smolensk
- Vyborg (two towers of the medieval wall remain, while one bastion on one side and a full set on the other remains from the bastioned fortifications)
- Yaroslavl (only several towers still stand)
- Novokuznetsk
- Gorodets

Kremlins (citadels)

- Ladoga
- Swiyazhsk
- Astrakhan
- Ivangorod
- Kazan
- Kolomna
- Moscow
- Nizhny Novgorod
- Novgorod
- Porkhov
- Tobolsk
- Tula
- Zaraysk
- Korela
- Rostov
- Beloozyorsk
- Suzdal
- Dmitrov
- Mozhaysk
- Gdov
- Uglich
- Yuriev-Polski
- Velikie Luki
- Yam
- Verkhoturie
- Serpukhov
- Alexandrov
- Suzran
- Vyazma
- Vologda
- Volokamsk
- Vladimir
- Zvenigorod-Moskovski
- Ryazan
- Pereyaslavl-Zalesski
- Bryansk
- Irkutsk

=== Serbia ===
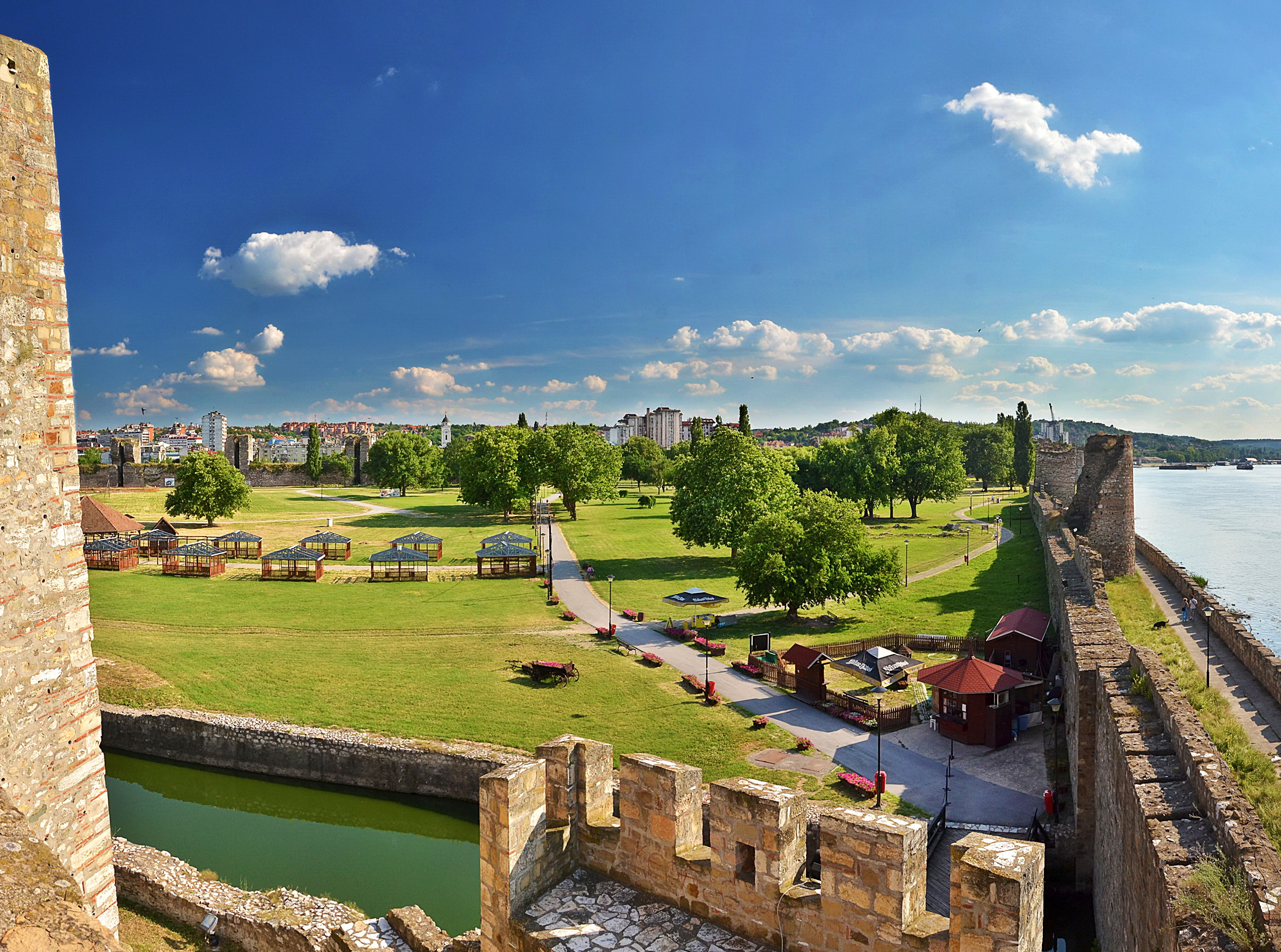
Inside Smederevo Fortress

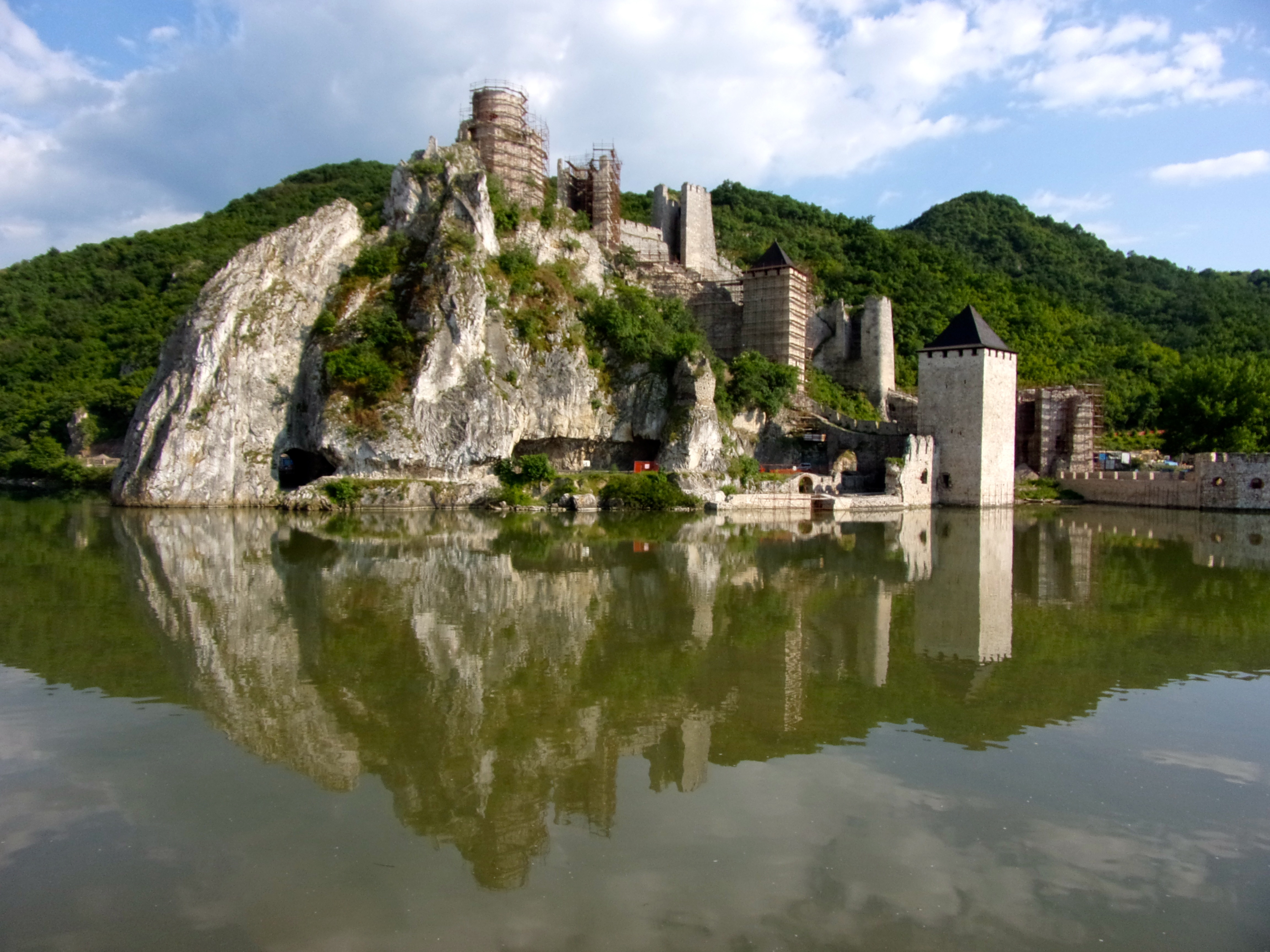
Golubac Fortress

- Belgrade – Kalemegdan
- Novi Sad – Petrovaradin
- Bač
- Manasija – Resava
- Niš
- Pirot
- Smederevo
- Golubac
- Maglič
- Šabac

=== Slovakia ===
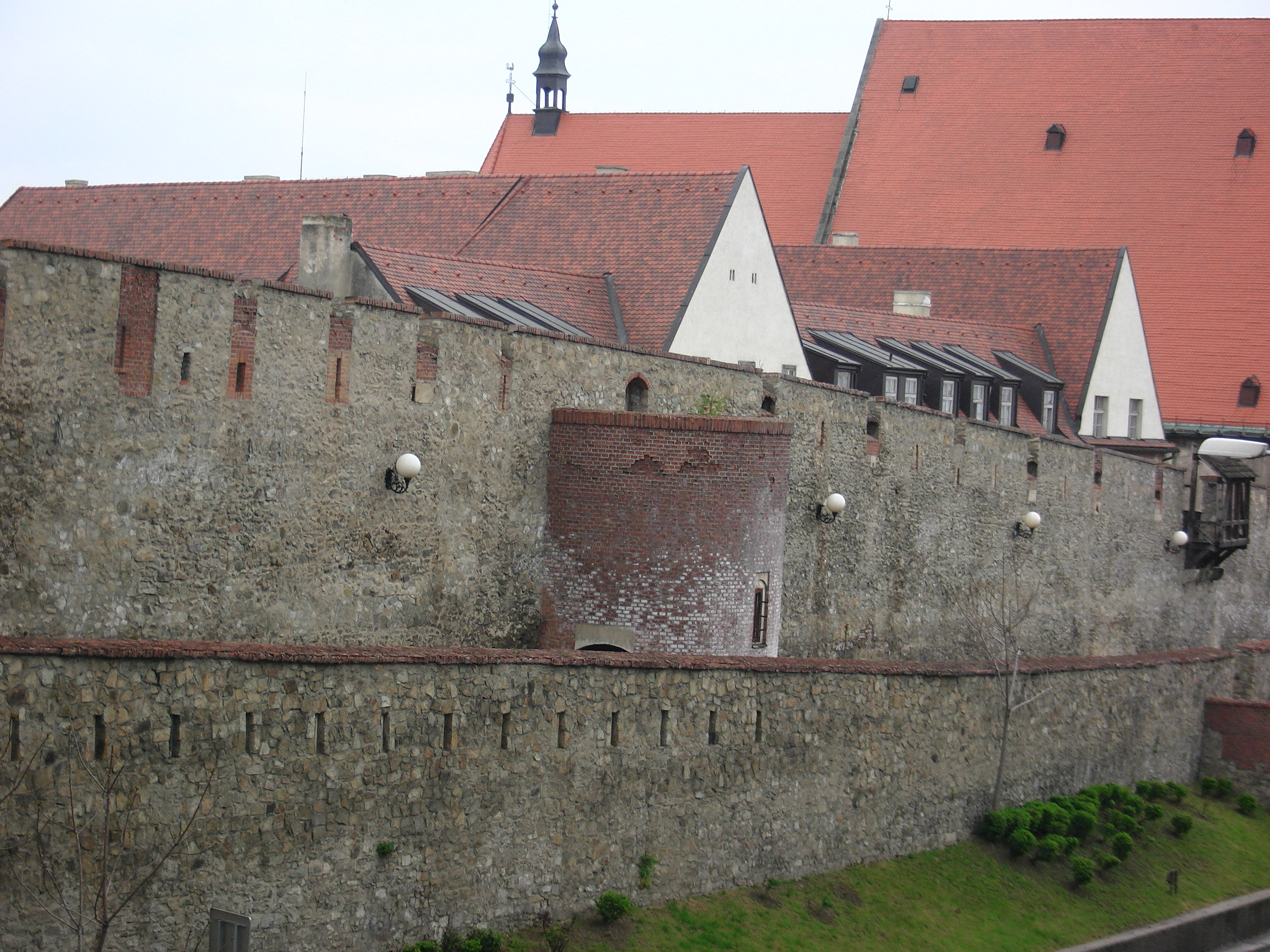
A part of the remaining defensive walls of Bratislava

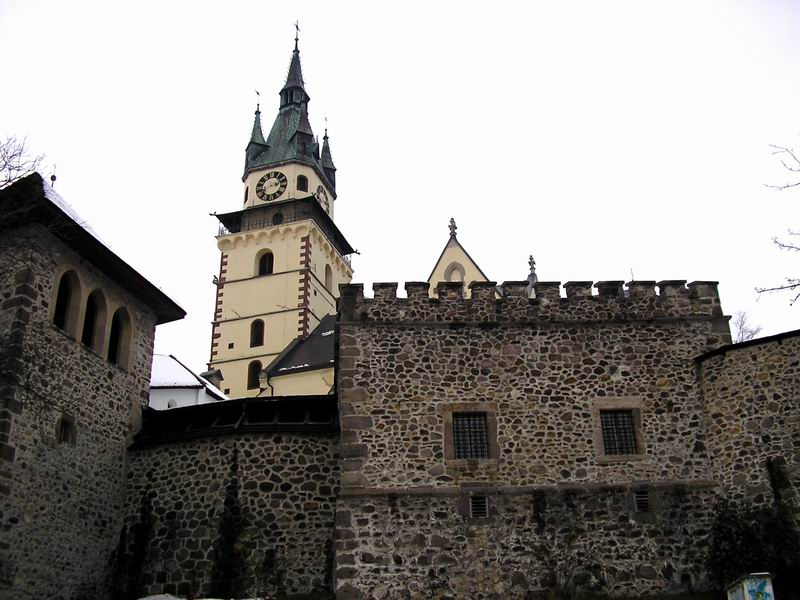
Town castle in Kremnica

- Banská Bystrica
- Banská Štiavnica – only one city gate left
- Bardejov – walls almost completely preserved, with bastions and barbican
- Beckov
- Bojnice – large parts of the wall preserved, together with one of the city gates
- Bratislava – only few structures have survived from original fortifications.
- Brezno
- Fiľakovo
- Komárno – baroque fortifications almost completely preserved
- Košice
- Kežmarok
- Kremnica – about two-thirds of the defensive walls around the town preserved, with several bastions and the city gate with barbican.
- Krupina
- Levice – parts of the defensive walls were found during an archaeological survey
- Levoča – almost completely preserved
- Modra – about two-thirds of the walls still standing, one bastion and one of the city gates
- Nové Zámky
- Pezinok – parts of the defensive walls visible on several locations of the town
- Podolínec
- Pukanec
- Prešov – parts of the defensive walls were found during an archaeological survey
- Sabinov
- Skalica – large parts preserved
- Spišská Kapitula
- Svätý Jur
- Trenčín – parts of the defensive walls were found during an archaeological survey
- Trnava – mostly preserved, with several bastions and one city gate
- Zvolen
- Žilina

=== Slovenia ===
- Celje
- Koper
- Kranj – evidence of the 1st-century fortifications and parts of the medieval fortifications, with four of the original eight towers preserved
- Ljubljana – In the 1st century AD, a Roman settlement called Emona, on the site of the present-day Ljubljana, was fortified with strong walls. A small section of the southern wall is still preserved to this day. Ljubljana got its medieval walls, like many other towns in Slovenia, in the 13th century
- Maribor – Originally 13th-century fortifications, rebuilt several times until the 17th century; some segments, including three towers and two bastions, are still preserved. Withstood sieges by Matthias Corvinus in 1480/1481 and by the Ottoman Empire in 1532.
- Novo Mesto
- Piran – 7th-century fortification, expanded between 1470 and 1533
- Ptuj – 13th-century fortification
- Slovenj Gradec
- Škofja Loka
- Vipavski Križ

=== Spain ===
- A Coruña – fragmentary remains and 3 gates
- Aínsa
- Alarcón
- Albarracín
- Alburquerque
- Alcalá de Henares – has preserved 1,200 metres of walls dotted with 19 towers
- Alcántara, Cáceres
- Alcúdia
- Almazán
- Alquézar
- Artajona
- Astorga
- Atienza
- Ávila – has the most complete medieval walls in Spain, half of which is navigable on foot
- Badajoz – has medieval walls and most of its renaissance fortress
- Balaguer
- Barcelona – has portions of a Roman wall
- Béjar
- Belmonte
- Berlanga de Duero
- Besalú
- Brihuega
- Buitrago del Lozoya – has complete medieval walls.
- Burgos – has some sizable remaining parts of the town walls alongside the Paseo Cubos and to the north east of the castle, including 10 wall towers. There are also remaining towers at the Calle Trinidad and the Calle San Lesmes. Five gates still remain intact, the Arco de Santa Maria, the Arco San Martin, the Arco de San Esteban, the Arco de San Gil and the Arco de San Juan
- Burgo de Osma-Ciudad de Osma
- Cáceres
- Campo Maior
- Cartagena
- Castellar de la Frontera
- Cedeira – fragmentary remains
- Ceuta
- Ciudad Real
- Ciudad Rodrigo – suffered several sieges in Napoleonic wars, walls remain intact
- Ciutadella de Menorca
- Coca, Segovia
- Córdoba
- Coria – the old town is still completely surrounded by medieval and Roman walls
- Covarrubias, Province of Burgos
- Cuéllar
- Cuenca
- Daroca
- Frías, Province of Burgos
- Galisteo – the town walls are completely preserved
- Gijón
- Girona
- Granada
- Zarza de Granadilla
- Haza, Province of Burgos
- Hondarribia
- Huesca – fragmentary remains
- Ibiza
- Jerez de los Caballeros
- Laguardia
- Laredo – two town gates still remain, the Puerta de Merenillo and the Puerta de Bilbao
- Llanes
- León – has an almost complete set of Roman walls dating back to the 3rd century AD, besides some parts built during the Middle Ages
- Loarre
- Lugo – has completely intact Roman walls. It is protected by UNESCO as a World Heritage Site
- Maderuelo
- Walls of Madrid – five walls
- Maderuelo
- Madrigal de las Altas Torres
- Málaga
- Mansilla de las Mulas
- Manzaneda – Part of the medieval wall still remains, including one of the 3 gates
- Mataró
- Medina del Campo – fragmentary remains
- Melilla – the old town is still fully enclosed by its impressive medieval walls
- Mirambel
- Molina de Aragón
- Monforte de Lemos – most of the 13th century city walls have been preserved, including two gates.
- Montblanc
- Montfalco Murallat
- Mora de Rubielos
- Morella
- Niebla, Huelva
- Olivenza – the oldest part of the town, the area adjacent to the medieval castle of Olivenza, still has well-preserved stretches of walls and towers, including two original town gates. Large parts of the later star-shaped Renaissance fortifications are also preserved, including 9 bastions and 1 town gate, the Puerta del Calvario
- Olmedo
- Oviedo – has preserved parts of its medieval walls
- Palazuelos
- Palma, Majorca
- Pamplona
- Pedraza, Segovia
- Peñíscola
- Plasencia
- Portillo, Valladolid – fragmentary remains
- Rada
- Rello
- Requena
- Ronda – has almost complete walls (not counting the gorge which defends it on one side)
- Salamanca
- San Vicente de la Barquera – the old town has preserved the walls along with the castle
- Santander – the old town had medieval defensive walls. A stretch of wall alongside Calle de Cádiz is all that remains
- Santiago de Compostela – only a gate (Arco de Mazarelos) remains
- Santillana del Mar – there are fragmentary remains of the medieval walls, including a stretch of wall alongside a car park southeast of the old town and a tower at the Plaza las Arenas facing to the north
- Sasamón
- Segovia – preserves parts of the wall plus three gates
- Sigüenza
- Soria
- Talavera de la Reina
- Tarifa
- Tarragona
- Tiedra – vestiges
- Toledo
- Tortosa – large parts of the extensively fortified medieval town remain intact
- Tossa de Mar
- Tui – a large part of both the 12th century wall and the 17/18th century fortifications has been preserved.
- Urueña
- Valencia – preserves portions of a Muslim wall and towers from Christian medieval age
- Valladolid – vestiges
- Vitoria-Gasteiz – fragmentary remains
- Viveiro – fragmentary remains and 3 gates of the original 6
- Xàtiva
- Zamora – the old town walls remain largely intact, especially at the north, west and riverside of the old town.
- Zaragoza

=== Sweden ===
- City wall of Visby
- Gothenburg has a part of the western city wall left, the bastion Carolus Rex at Esperantoplatsen (Esperanto square) and most of the city moat is still left.
- Halmstad had renaissance ramparts. To the north of the old town a bastion with adjacent town gate remains, the Norre Port. To the south of the old town a bastion with a remnant of the moat remains.
- Kalmar substantial remains of the walls. Sizable stretches of walls and a bastion remain to the south of the old town. To the east remain two bastions. To the north remain portions of wall near Fiskaregatan. To the west the shape of two bastions is clearly recognizable, with a ravelin in front of the remaining town gate Westport (Westgate). Two other town gates still remain, an unmanned gate of later date at the Skeppsbrogatan, and a gate at Skeppsbron.
- Stockholm has a small remainder of the medieval city wall preserved.
- Bohus Fortress

=== Switzerland ===
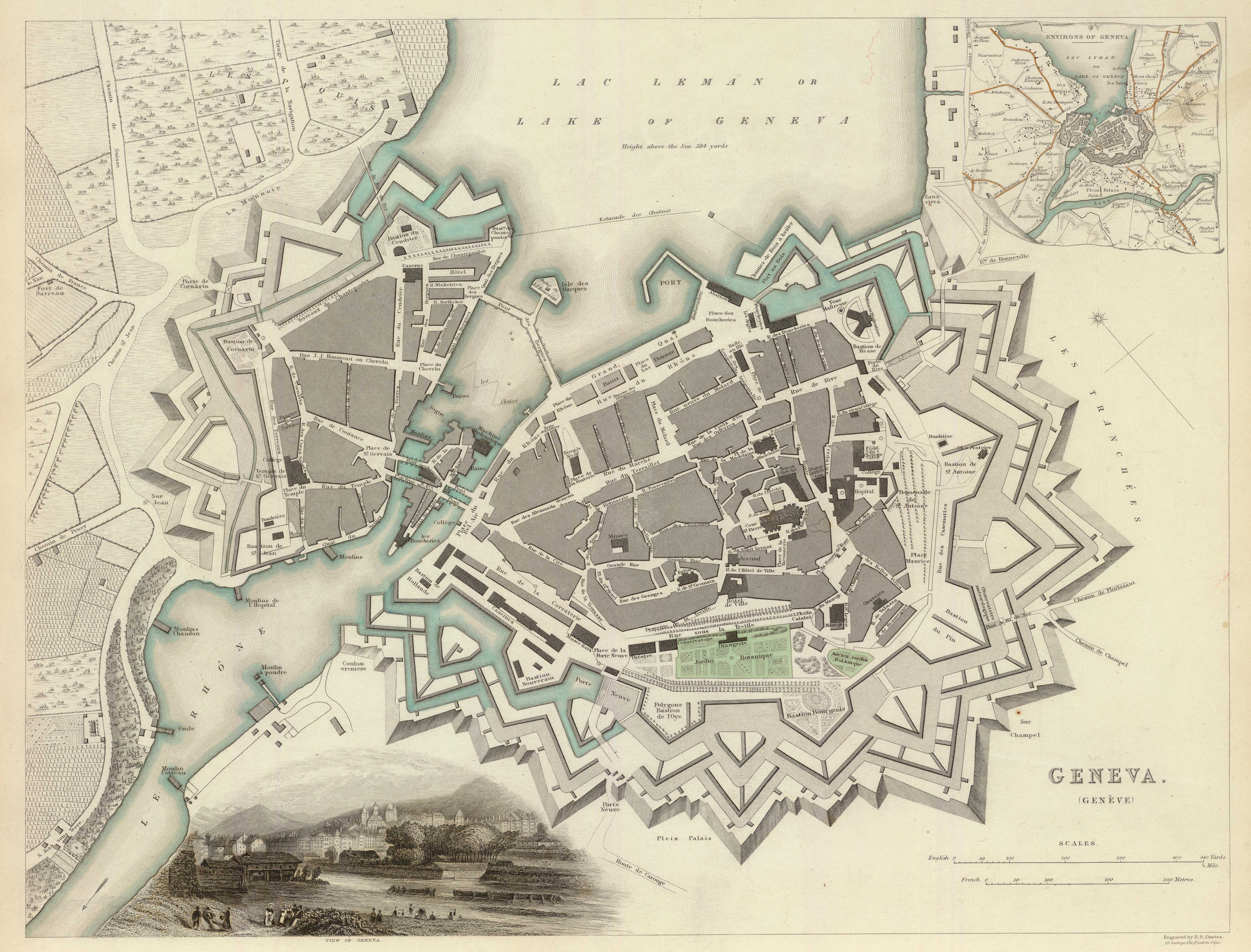
Plan of Geneva and environs in 1841. The colossal fortifications, among the most important in Europe, were demolished ten years later.

- Aarau – the remains of the medieval town walls include two town gates (the Haldertor and the Oberer Turm) and a tower (the Pulverturm) with an adjacent stretch of wall.
- Altstätten
- Arbon – the remains include some fragments of wall and a tower converted into a house.
- Avenches
- Baden, Switzerland
- Basel
- Bellinzona (Dominated by its three castles: Castelgrande, Castello di Montebello and Castello di Sasso Corbaro)
- Biel
- Bremgarten
- Brugg
- Bülach
- Chur
- Delémont
- Diessenhofen
- Frauenfeld
- Fribourg
- Geneva
- Greifensee
- Grüningen
- Gruyères
- Ilanz
- Laufen
- Lausanne
- Lenzburg
- Liestal – one town gate remains.
- Lucerne – the wall on the northern bank of the Reuss is well preserved and among the principal landmarks of the city. It is called Museggmauer and Stadtmauer.
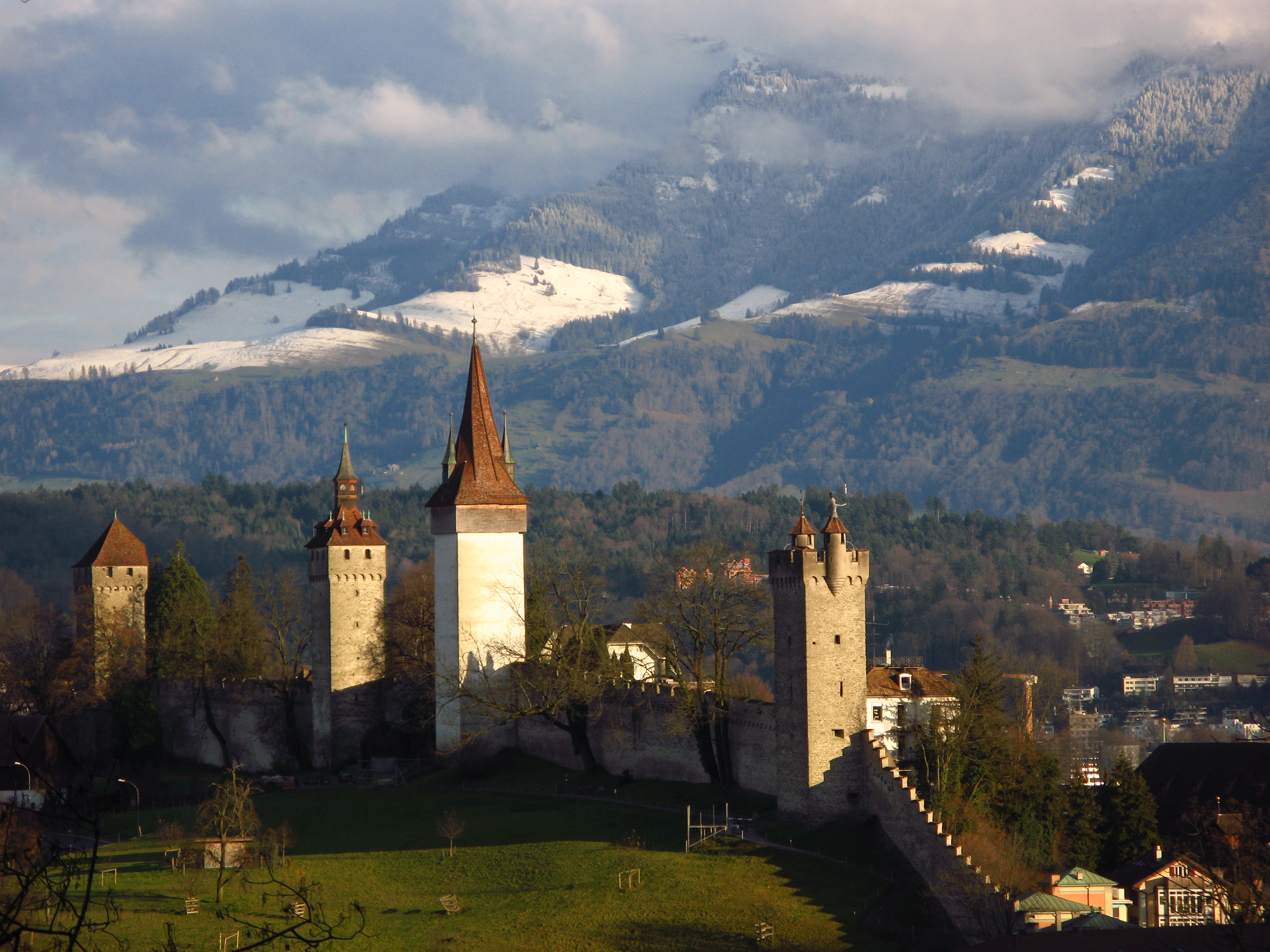
  The late medieval walls of Lucerne, called Museggmauer or Stadtmauer.
- Maienfeld
- Meienberg, Sins, Aargau
- Morges
- Münchenstein
- Murten: Medieval walls
- Neuchâtel
- Nyon
- Olten
- Orbe
- Rapperswil
- Regensberg
- Rheinfelden
- Romont
- Schaffhausen
- Sempach
- Solothurn – large parts still remain, including several walls, towers and a bastion. Two town gates remain, the impressive Baseltor and the Bieltor.
- Steckborn
- Sursee
- Thun
- Uznach
- Wangen an der Aare
- Werdenberg
- Wiedlisbach
- Willisau
- Winterthur
- Yverdon-les-Bains
- Zofingen
- Zug – the only remainder of the inner town walls is the Zeitturm (Clocktower), a medieval town gate. The remains of the outer town walls include four towers (the Kapuzinerturm, Knopfliturm, Huwilerturm and the Pulverturm), and some stretches of wall.
- Zürich – the main remains are the Schanzengraben, and the shapes of several bastions are recognizable through the course of the moat. One bastions remains largely intact, and it now houses the Alter Botanischer Garten.

=== Turkey ===
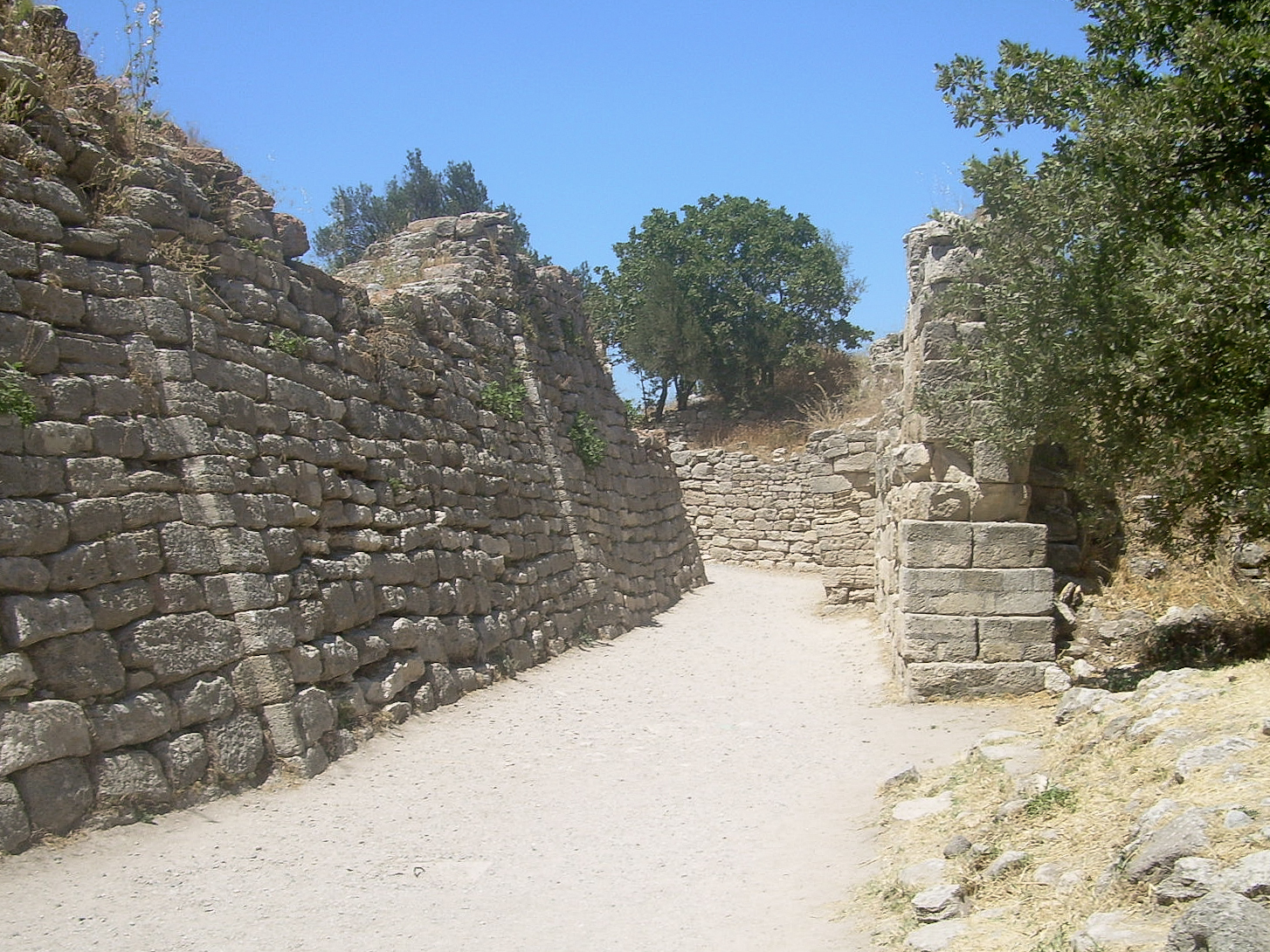
A surviving section of the stone base of the walls of Troy, Turkey

- Troy. The ancient city of Troy was famous for its defensive walls. There is archaeological evidence that Troy VII, generally identified as the stage of the legendary Trojan War of Homer's Iliad, usually dated between 1194 BC – 1184 BC, had walls with a carefully built stone base over four meters thick and some nine meters high in places, which was surmounted by a larger superstructure with towers in mudbrick. The walls in Homer's epic are so mighty that the siege of Troy by Achaeans lasts more than nine years, and only could be finished with the trickery of the Trojan Horse. Sections of the stone base of Trojan walls still survive on the archaeological site in present-day Hisarlık, in Çanakkale Province.
- Istanbul. The system of walls around (as it was then known) Constantinople built in 412 by the Roman emperor Theodosius II was a complex stone barrier that stretched 6.5 kilometers and is often called the Wall of Theodosius. This barrier stood impregnable for ten centuries and resisted several violent sieges until 1453 when the Ottomans succeeded in breaching the walls. There was a new element in the battlefield: the Ottoman army had powder cannon and the walls offered limited resistance to them.

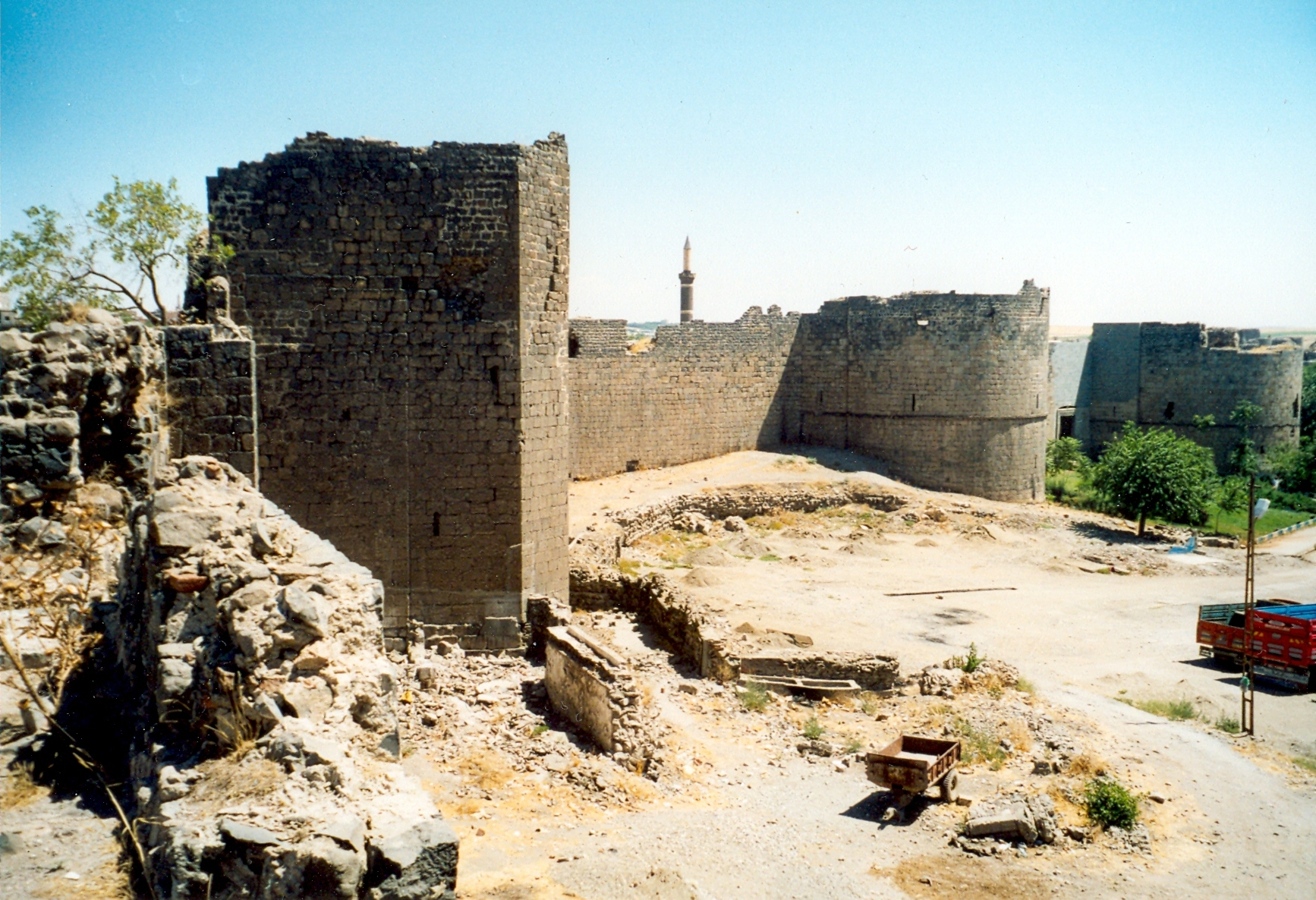
Roman walls of Diyarbakır, Turkey

- Diyarbakır. Diyarbakır is surrounded by an almost intact, dramatic set of high walls of black basalt forming a 5.5 km (3.4 mi) circle around the old city. There are four gates into the old city and 82 watch-towers on the walls, which were built in antiquity, restored and extended by the Roman emperor Constantius in 349.
- Ankara 34 diamond shaped towers surround 1 kilometer outer walls.
- Çanakkale
- İznik Ancient Nicaea was ringed with walls that survive to this day, despite having been pierced in places to accommodate roads. İznik was originally ringed with 5 km (3 mi) of walls that were about 10 m (33 ft) high and enclosed within a double ditch on the landward sides. The walls incorporated over 100 towers. Large gates on the three landward sides of the walls provided the only entrances to the city. The western part of the walls rose up beside the lake which is sufficiently large that it cannot easily be blockaded from the land. Today the walls are ruined but enough still survives to provide a pleasant walking route.
- Antalya
- Sinop Some parts of the fortress, especially the north walls, are ruined.
- Rize
- Amasya
- Bodrum Castle is magnificient. Halicarnassus ancient city walls are mostly ruinous. Western wall is walkable.
- Alanya The old city walls surround much of the eastern peninsula, and can be walked. Inside the walls are numerous historic villas, well preserved examples of the classical period of Ottoman architecture.
- Ani A line of walls that encircled the entire city defended Ani. The most powerful defenses were along the northern side of the city, the only part of the site not protected by rivers or ravines. Here the city was protected by a double line of walls, the much taller inner wall studded by numerous large and closely spaced semicircular towers. Online images suggest that the walls have been reconstructed recently.
- Kuşadası
- Pergamon The wall, with numerous gates, surrounded the entire hill, not just the upper city and the flat area to the southwest, all the way to the Selinus river.
- Assos West of the acropolis stands the well preserved 4th century BC city wall and main gate with 14-meter-high (46 ft) towers.
- Bozcaada
- Edirne
- Trabzon. Most of the city walls are still standing and are among the city's oldest buildings. Their oldest part can be dated back to the 1st century AD during the Roman Empire era. Historical sources provide information about older stages of their construction. Xenophon, who visited the city in the 5th century BC also mentioned the existence of city walls
- Enez
- Bursa The Bursa Fortress Walls encircle the city’s earliest settlement core and form a historic line of defense bearing traces of Roman, Byzantine and Ottoman eras. About 2.3 kilometer.
- Sığacık Hosts an Ottoman castle built in 1522. Remnants of ancient city walls, less than 1 kilometer in length, about 2 meters high, form outside wall of houses built in the city.
- Notion (ancient city)
- Ephesus
- Foça The fortification wall around the ancient city of Phocaea was built in 590-580 BC. About half a kilometer exist on the seaside north and west of Eski Foca.
- Alaşehir

=== Ukraine ===
City walls

- Bilhorod-Dnistrovskyi (see Akkerman Fortress)
- Chernihiv (only ruins remain underground)
- Hlukhiv (Kyiv Gate)
- Kropyvnytskyi (small parts of St. Elizabeth Fortress survived)
- Kyiv (see Golden Gate)
- Lviv (see Hlyniany Gate and Lviv High Castle)

Citadels and castles

- Lutsk (see Lubart's Castle)
- Kamianets-Podilskyi (see Kamianets-Podilskyi Castle)
- Kremenets (see Kremenets Castle)
- Khotyn (see Khotyn Fortress)
- Khust (see Khust Castle)
- Mangup
- Medzhybizh (see Medzhybizh Fortress)
- Mukachevo (see Palanok Castle)
- Stare Selo (see Stare Selo Castle)
- Sudak
- Uzhhorod (see Uzhhorod Castle)
- Yeni-Kale

=== United Kingdom ===
==== England ====
Place	County	Condition	Image	Notes
Alnwick	Northumberland	Grade I listed Bondgate (Hotspur Gateway) and section of wall remain of medieval defences, Pottergate Tower is C18 rebuild of medieval gate and may incorporate some medieval fabric.		
Bath	Somerset	Several fragments of the medieval wall still survive. The East Gate is the only remaining gateway.		The length of wall opposite the Mineral Water Hospital is largely a reconstruction of the medieval wall. By far the best length, over 160 ft, could until 1963 be seen on the site cleared by an air-raid in 1940. This was the SE corner of the medieval city. The remains of this wall now lie buried below the shops of Stall Street.
Berwick-upon-Tweed	Northumberland	The Elizabethan ramparts with their bastions, gateways and earthworks survive.		Spades Mire is an earthwork linear ditches, possibly forming an outer line of defence for medieval Berwick. Situated on the south side of the ditch are traces of an accompanying rampart, now much spread and up to 13m wide. The Lord's Mount is a massive curved stone bulwark which was built in the 1540s to protect the town walls at their weakest point.
Bridgnorth	Shropshire	The North Gate is still present, the site of the former Postern Gate still very visible; and parts of the wall now form garden walls in various parts of the town.		Bridgnorth's town walls were initially constructed in timber between 1216 and 1223; murage grants allowed them to be upgraded to stone between the 13th and 15th centuries.
Bristol	Bristol	Most of the walls were demolished in 1760, although traces and one city gate remain.		The walls were initially raised by Geoffrey de Montbray, a Norman nobleman who built Bristol Castle.
Canterbury	Kent	Over half of the original circuit survives, including Westgate, the largest surviving city gate in England.		Originally fortified by the Romans.
Carlisle	Cumbria	The castle and western walls largely survive.		
Chester	Cheshire	Mostly intact		The city walls are one of the city's biggest tourist attractions. They were originally built by the Romans and continue to form a complete ring around much of the present-day city centre.
Chichester	West Sussex			The original Roman city wall was over 6 1/2 foot (2.0 m) thick with a steep ditch (which was later used to divert the River Lavant). It survived for over one and a half thousand years but was then replaced by a thinner Georgian wall.
Colchester	Essex	Approximately half of the walls remain.		The town was surrounded by a wall built by the Romans after Boudica had sacked the town.
Coventry	West Midlands	Two gates survive, connected by a section of wall that runs through Lady Herbert's Garden. Other small fragments dotted around the city centre, mainly hidden by modern buildings, include the remains of a bastion near Upper Well Street. Several fragments have been incorporated into newer buildings, including the Town Wall Tavern.		The walls were mostly demolished in 1662.
Durham	County Durham	The Castle formed the largest part of Durham's defences, with the neighbouring "Backgate", demolished in the 1760s, which sat across Sadler Street. This was accompanied by a Gaol, which survived until the 1840s, remains of which are present in an alley off Sadler Street. Other walls surrounding the centre of Durham survive between the River Wear, and the houses lining a number of thoroughfares: Sadler Street, North Bailey, South Bailey, and Palace Green. The street names North Bailey and South Bailey are testament to this fact.		It is debatable just how defensive these walls were, and some parts have since become garden walls. The archway of a Water Gate survives where South Bailey meets Prebends' Bridge.
Exeter	Devon	The walls comprise Roman, Anglo-Saxon and medieval elements. 72% of the circuit survives.		
Great Yarmouth	Norfolk	About two-thirds of the wall remains. Of the original eighteen towers, eleven survive.		The walls date back to the Middle Ages.
Hartlepool	County Durham			Dating from the late 14th century, the limestone wall once enclosed the whole of the medieval town.
Hereford	Herefordshire			
Kingston upon Hull	East Riding of Yorkshire			
Leicester	Leicestershire	Mostly demolished in the 16th century.		The city walls were originally built by the Romans and most of them still remained by the 15th century, however archaeological evidence suggests that they were partially destroyed and rebuilt a number of times, including after the 1173 rebellion.
Lincoln	Lincolnshire	Fragmentary remains.		
London	Greater London	Fragments of London's Wall, the wall that once surrounded the Roman town of Londinium, are still visible just outside the Museum of London and at Tower Hill in the City of London.		
Ludlow	Shropshire	Good lengths of the wall remain and a number of the gates too		
Newcastle upon Tyne	Tyne and Wear	Much of the town wall was demolished during the late 18th and early 19th centuries but several sections still remain.		
Norwich	Norfolk			
Oxford	Oxfordshire	Major fragments are preserved in the gardens of New College and Merton College and as part of the exterior wall of Pembroke College on Brewer Street.		
Rochester	Kent			The city walls were first built by the Romans.
Rye	East Sussex			In 1377 the town was sacked by the French, after which the city walls were completed as a defence against foreign raiders.
Salisbury	Wiltshire	Around the original medieval city, including the cathedral and the close.		
Shrewsbury	Shropshire	One long section remains along the 'Town Walls' road; other shorter sections exist, such as behind Newport House on Dogpole, and near Shrewsbury Castle.		
Southampton	Hampshire	Lengthy sections of Southampton town walls remain, especially to the south and west.		
Wareham	Dorset	Wareham town defences consist of an earthen rampart and ditch.		The best preserved Saxon town walls in England.
Warwick	Warwickshire	Two of the three main gates of the Norman town wall survive.		
Winchelsea	East Sussex	Three of four gateways survive from the walls built c. 1415; Strand Gate (late 13th century), Pipewell or Land Gate (rebuilt, early 15th century) and New Gate (late 13th century).		
Winchester	Hampshire	Walls fragmentary, but traceable throughout their length. Repaired in 14th and 15th centuries. Limestone rubble. South east corner of full height complete with battlements. Walls shared by the city, Wolvesey Palace, Cathedral Close and Wolvesey Castle. Two gates remain. Wall ran along line of Roman Wall."		
Worcester	Worcestershire	Remains of the Worcester city walls can still be seen		
York	North Yorkshire	the extensive city walls are the longest and most complete in England, lacking only a few short sections and most of the posterns.		

==== Northern Ireland ====
Place	County	Condition	Image	Notes
Bangor	County Down			
Carrickfergus	County Antrim	Only a few fragments of the walls remain		
Derry	County Londonderry	Completely intact		The city walls were completed in 1619, it was the last walled city to be built in Europe the walls are entirely intact (the only city on the island of Ireland to hold this distinction). The walls withstood several sieges, including the Siege of Derry in 1689. As the walls were never breached the city gained its nickname as "the maiden city".

==== Scotland ====
Place	Condition	Image	Notes
Dundee	Only one section of the city walls remain		First constructed in 1545, the Wishart Arch.
Edinburgh	Fragments of the 16th-century Flodden Wall and 17th-century Telfer Wall remain.		Walls were first constructed in the 12th century, although none of these remain today.
Stirling	5 significant segments of the 16th century town wall remain, including two defensive bastions.		The irregular 7m high and 1.8m thick wall was constructed to defend the southern and western approaches to the town, and today is bordered by the public walkway "the back walk"
St Andrews	Only two city gates remain.		

==== Wales ====
- Aberystwyth
- Beaumaris
- Brecon
- Caerleon (Isca Augusta)
- Caerwent (Venta Silurum)
- Caernarfon
- Cardiff
- Cardigan
- Chepstow – Port Wall
- Cowbridge
- Conwy
- Denbigh
- Hay on Wye
- Kenfig
- Kidwelly
- Monmouth
- Montgomery
- Tenby
- Pembroke
- Radnor

=== Vatican City ===
- Vatican City

== See also ==
- Defensive wall
- City gate
- Closed city
- Fortification
- List of walls
- Wall
- Stone wall
- Medieval fortification
