= Muraka =

Village in Estonia

Coordinates: 58°31′N 24°51′E

- Village
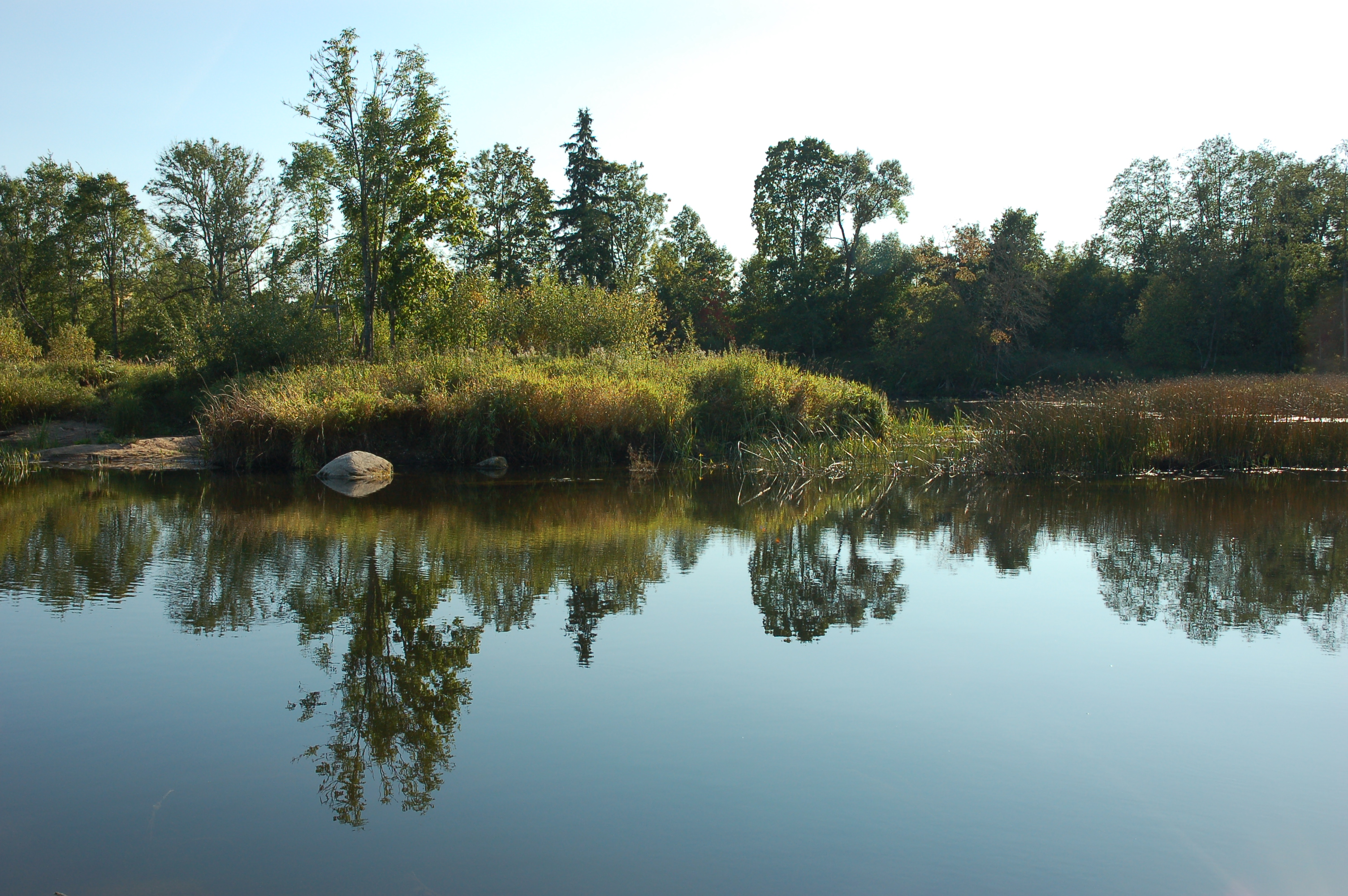
- The Muraka 'sacred grove island' in the Pärnu river in Muraka
- Interactive map of Muraka
- Country: Estonia
- County: Pärnu County
- Parish: Tori Parish
- Time zone: UTC+2 (EET)
  - Summer (DST): UTC+3 (EEST)

Muraka is a village in Tori Parish, Pärnu County in southwestern Estonia.
