= Tori, Estonia =

Borough in Estonia

Tori
- Small borough
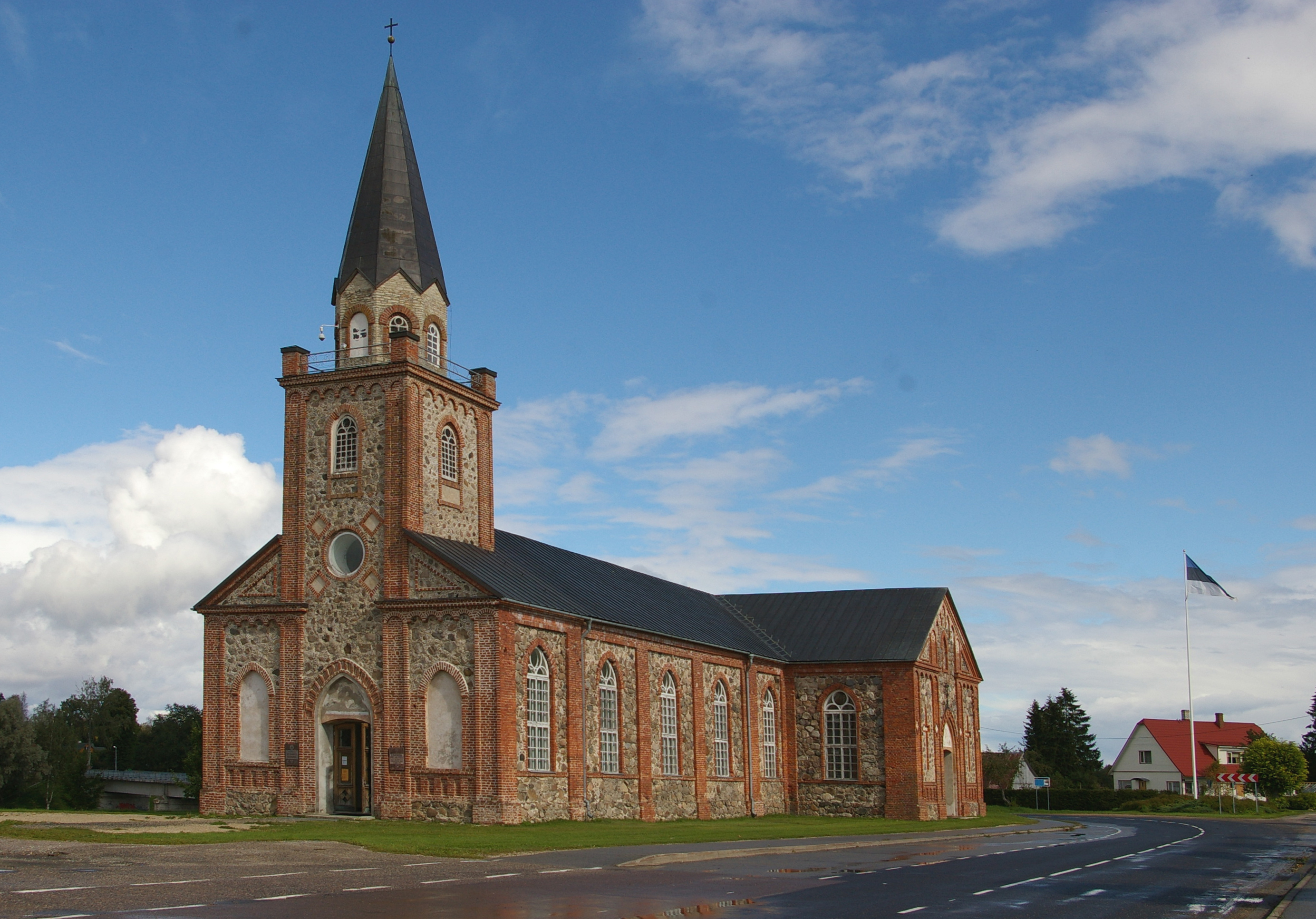
- Tori church

- Location in Estonia
- Coordinates: 58°28′53″N 24°48′42″E
- Country: Estonia
- County: Pärnu County
- Municipality: Tori Parish

Drone video of Tori (Estonia, Pärnumaa) in April 2023

Tori (German: Torgel) is a small borough (Estonian: alevik) in Tori Parish, Pärnu County, Estonia. Prior to the administrative reform of Estonian local governments in 2017, it was the administrative centre of Tori Parish, replaced by the town of Sindi.

Tori had a station on the Tallinn - Pärnu railway line operated by Elron, located in nearby Selja village. This closed in December 2018.

The oldest horse breeding farm in Estonia, which started operating in 1856 is located in Tori.

The Tori bridge is 135.8 meters long and was one of the longest in Estonia at one time. In 2022, the construction of a new bridge began.

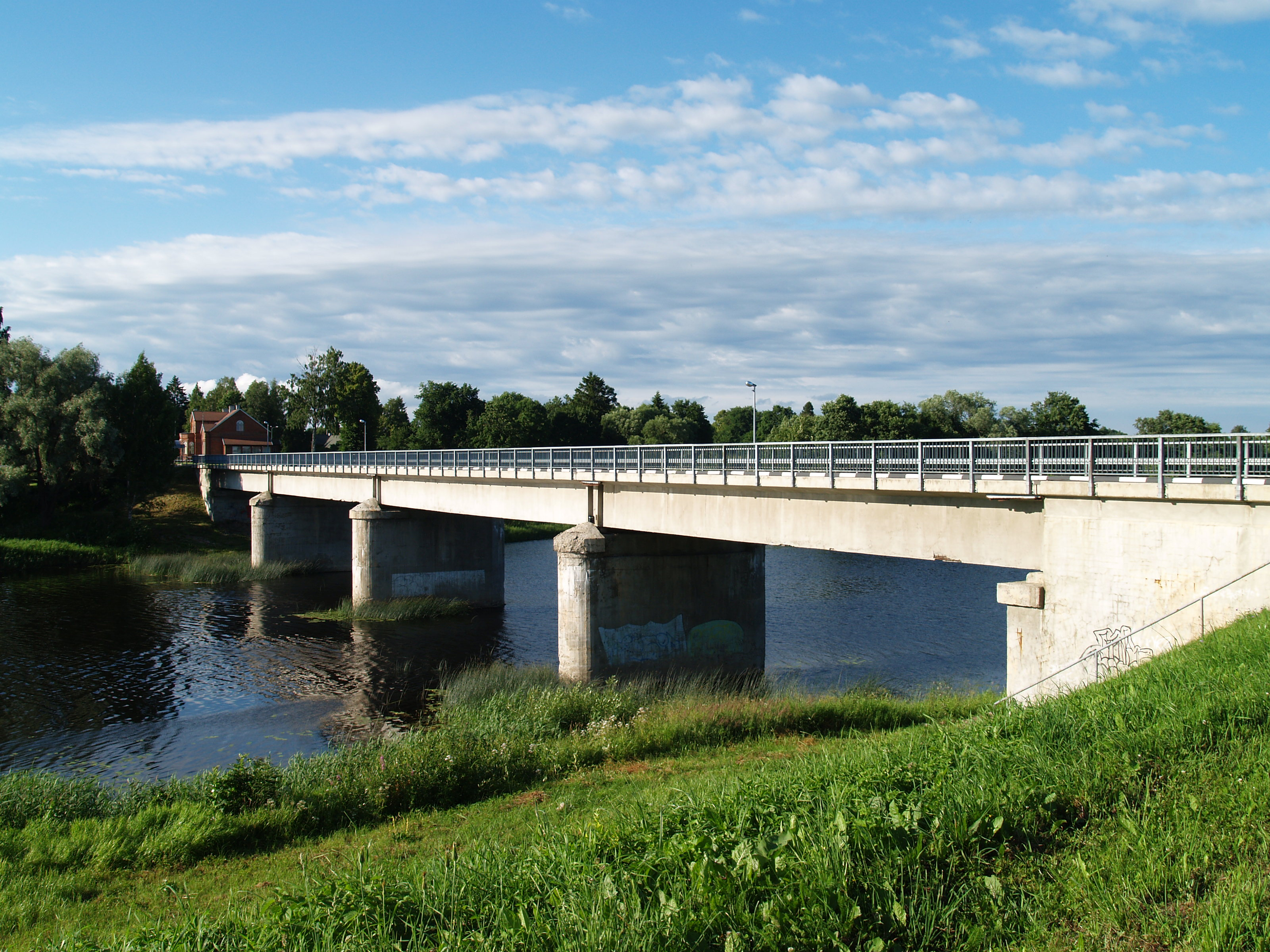
Tori bridge over Pärnu River

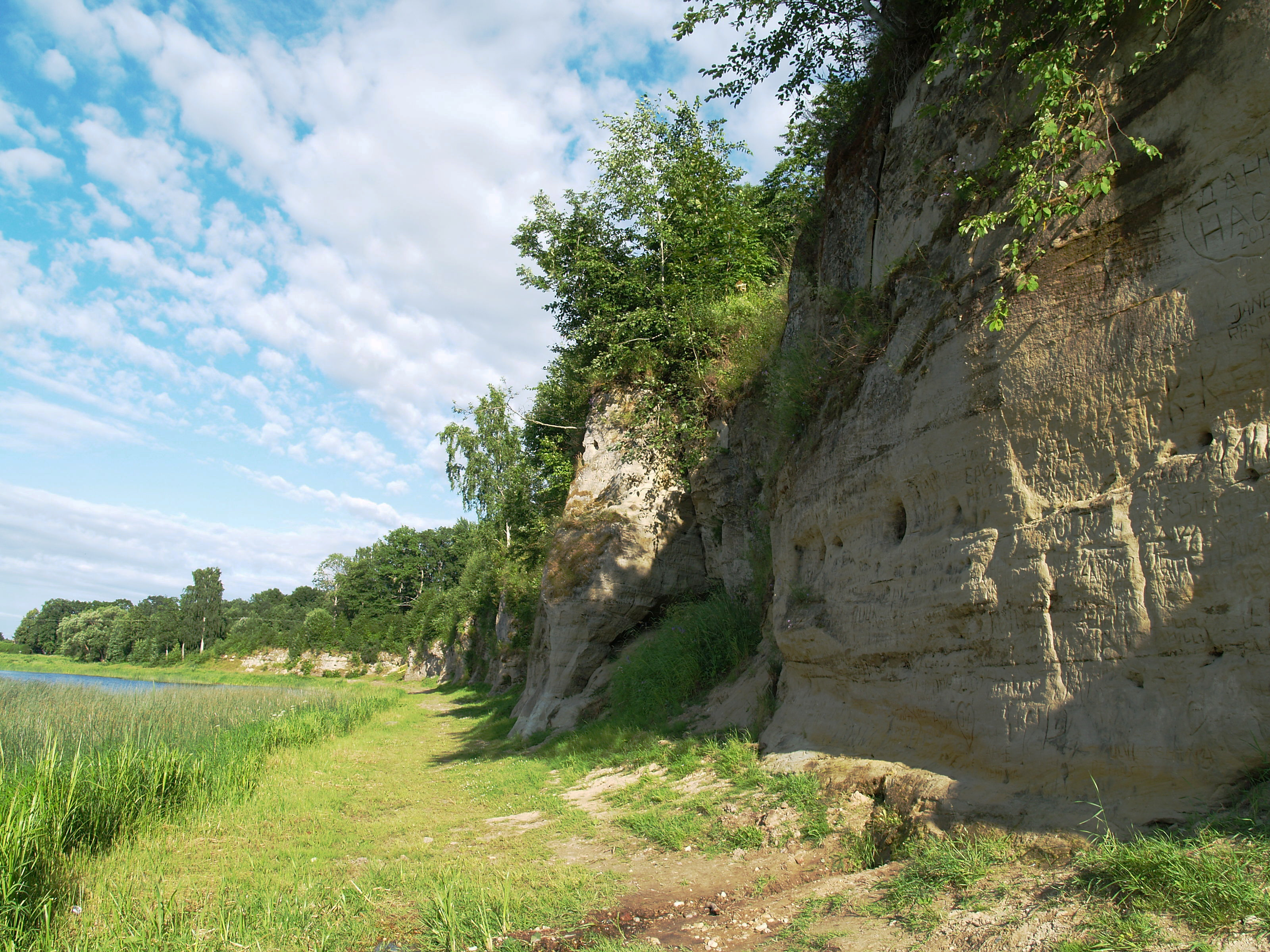
Sandstone outcrop

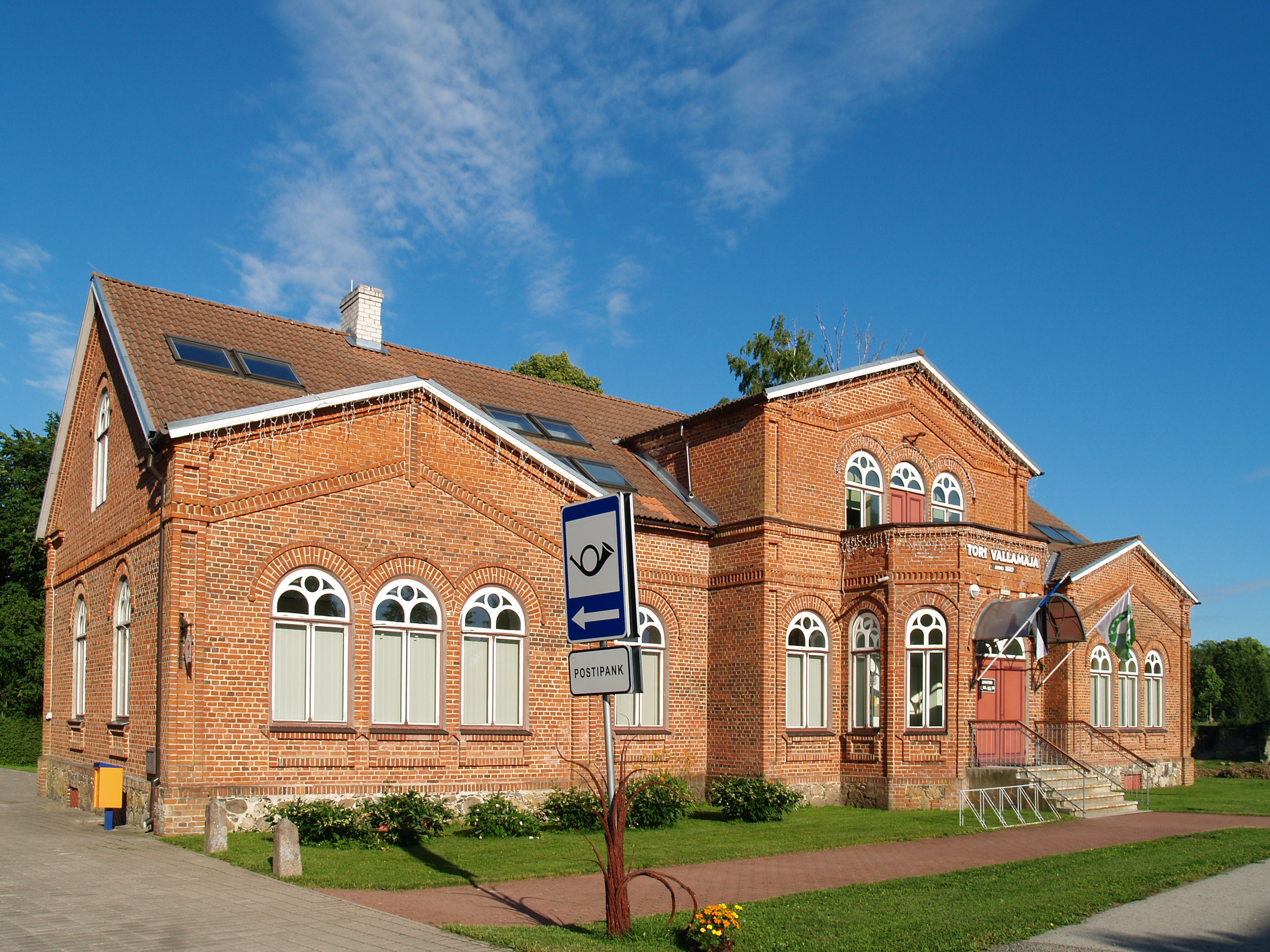
Tori parish house

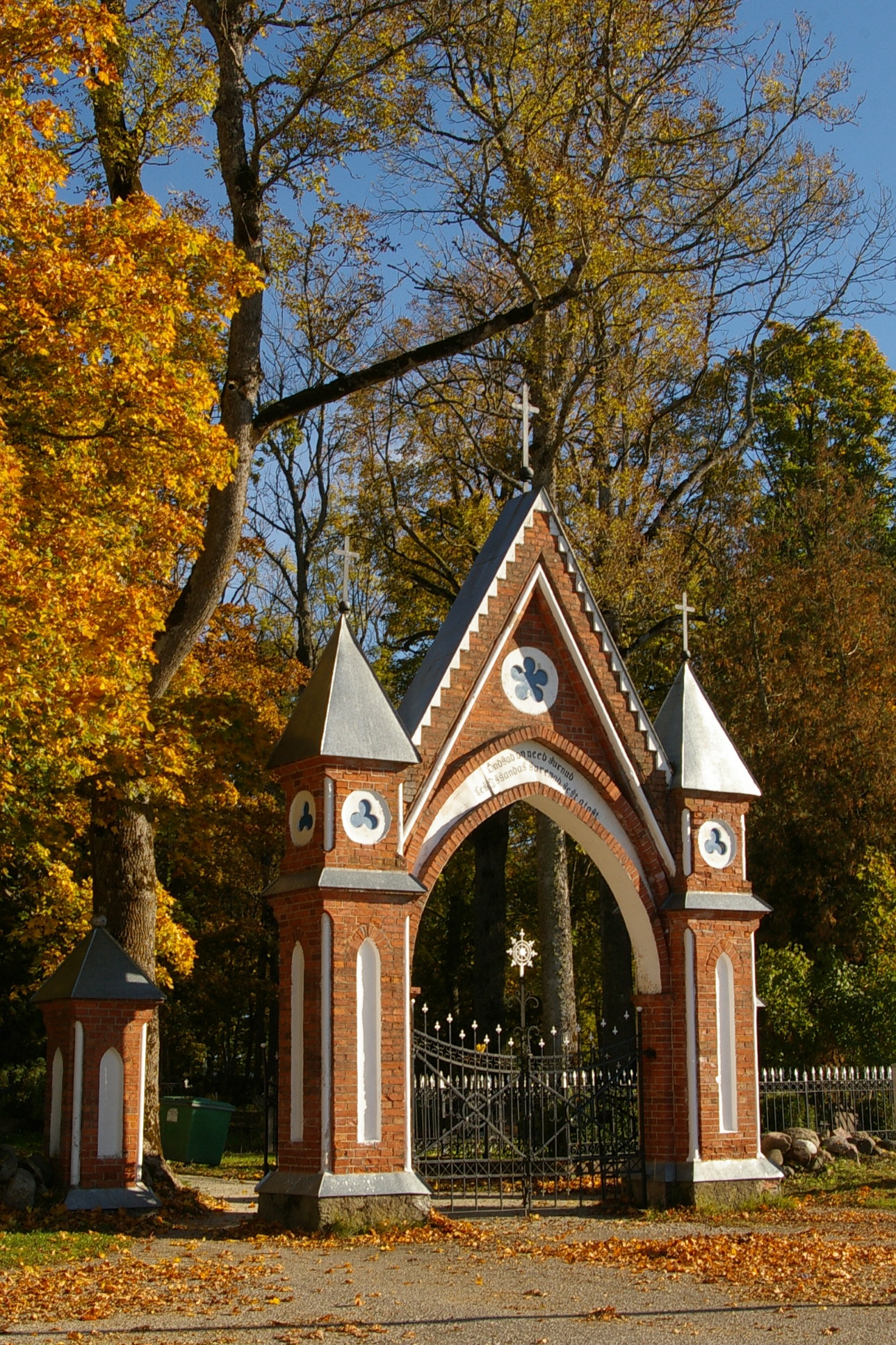
Gates of Tori cemetery

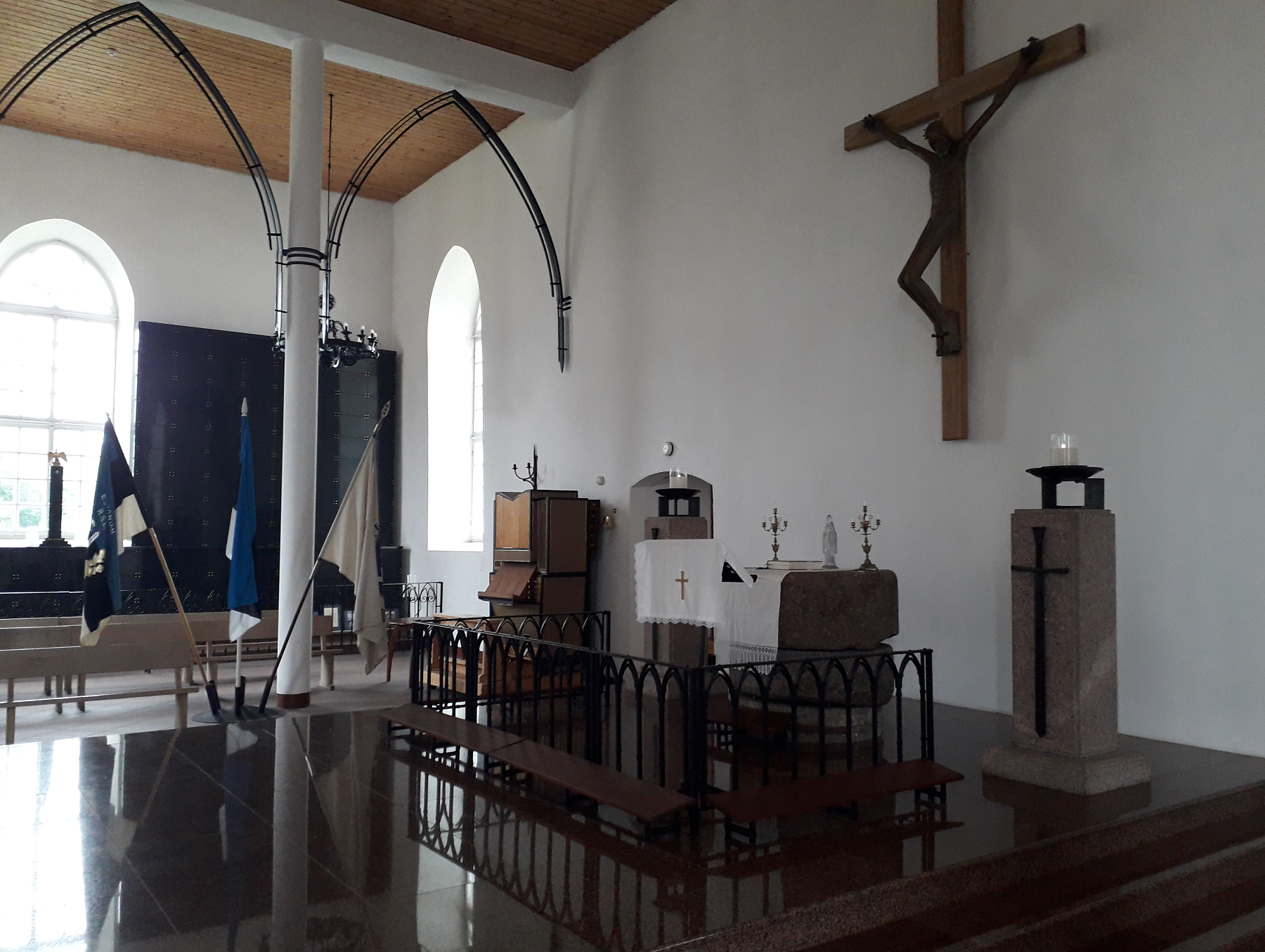
The interior of Tori church
