= Tohera =

Village in Estonia

Coordinates: 58°30′N 24°56′E

- Village
- Interactive map of Tohera
- Country: Estonia
- County: Pärnu County
- Parish: Tori Parish

Population (2020)
  - Total: 60
- Time zone: UTC+2 (EET)
  - Summer (DST): UTC+3 (EEST)

Tohera is a village in Tori Parish, Pärnu County in southwestern Estonia.
