= Mannare =

Village in Estonia

Coordinates: 58°33′N 24°52′E

- Village
- Interactive map of Mannare
- Country: Estonia
- County: Pärnu County
- Parish: Tori Parish
- Time zone: UTC+2 (EET)
  - Summer (DST): UTC+3 (EEST)

Mannare is a village in Tori Parish, Pärnu County in southwestern Estonia.
