= Levi, Estonia =

Village in Estonia

Coordinates: 58°29′46″N 24°50′54″E

Levi
- Village
- Interactive map of Levi
- Country: Estonia
- County: Pärnu County
- Parish: Tori Parish

Area
  - Total: 3.76 km^{2} (1.45 sq mi)

Population (2021)
  - Total: 38
- Time zone: UTC+2 (EET)
  - Summer (DST): UTC+3 (EEST)

Levi is a village in Tori Parish, Pärnu County in southwestern Estonia.
