= Eametsa, Tori Parish =

Village in Estonia

Eametsa
- Village
- Location within Estonia
- Coordinates: 58°26′06″N 24°27′39″E
- Country: Estonia
- County: Pärnu County
- Parish: Tori Parish
- Time zone: UTC+2 (EET)
  - Summer (DST): UTC+3 (EEST)

Eametsa is a village in Tori Parish, Pärnu County in southwestern Estonia.

Pärnu Airport (ICAO: EEPU) is located in Eametsa.
