= Tammiste =

Tammiste may refer to several places in Estonia:

- Tammiste, Pärnu County, village in Tori Parish, Pärnu County
- Tammiste, Tartu County, village in Elva Parish, Tartu County
