= Nurme, Tori Parish =

Village in Estonia

Coordinates: 58°26′59″N 24°30′12″E

Nurme
- Village
- Interactive map of Nurme
- Country: Estonia
- County: Pärnu County
- Parish: Tori Parish
- Time zone: UTC+2 (EET)
  - Summer (DST): UTC+3 (EEST)

Nurme is a village in Tori Parish, Pärnu County in southwestern Estonia.
