= Theodor Pool =

Estonian politician (1890–1942)

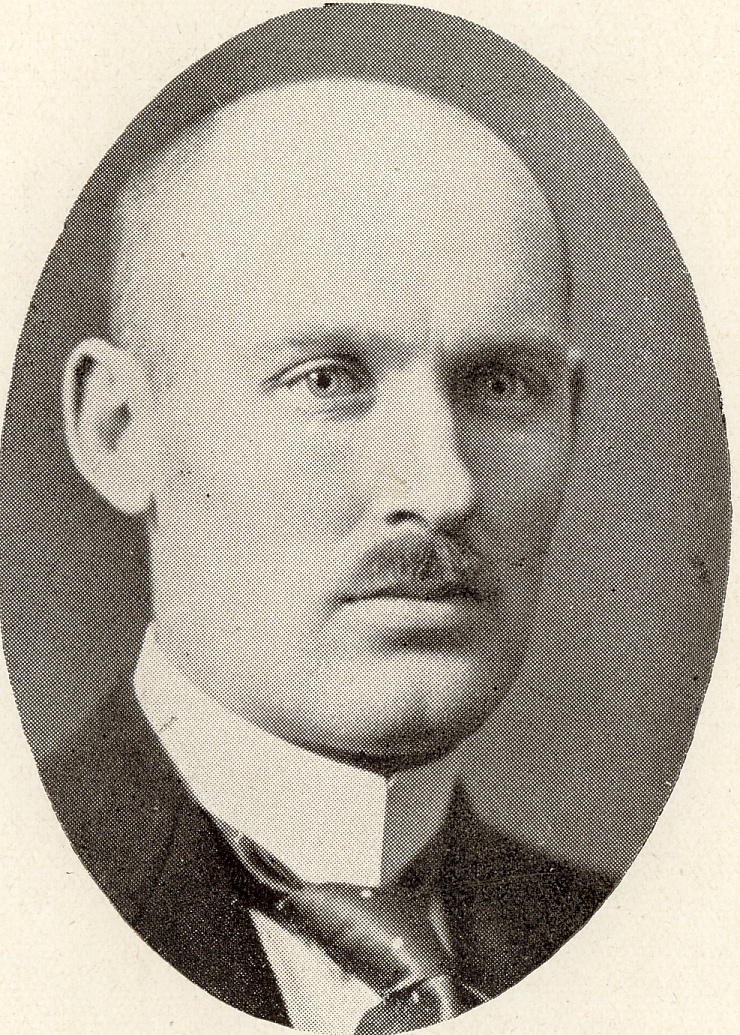
Theodore Pool

Theodor Pool (8 December 1890 Piistaoja (now Tori Parish), Kreis Pernau – 25 August 1942 Sverdlovsk, Russian SFSR) was an Estonian politician, agronomist and writer. He was a member of the Constitutional Assembly of Estonia and of the I, II, III and IV Riigikogu, representing the Estonian Labour Party.

In 1919 he was Minister of Food and Agricultural Affairs and the Minister of Agriculture, from 1920 until 1929. Pool was arrested in 1941 by the NKVD during the first Soviet occupation of Estonia and placed within the Gulag camp system. He was executed by gunshot in Sverdlovsk Oblast the following year.
