= Randivälja =

Village in Estonia

Coordinates: 58°28′N 24°48′E

- Village
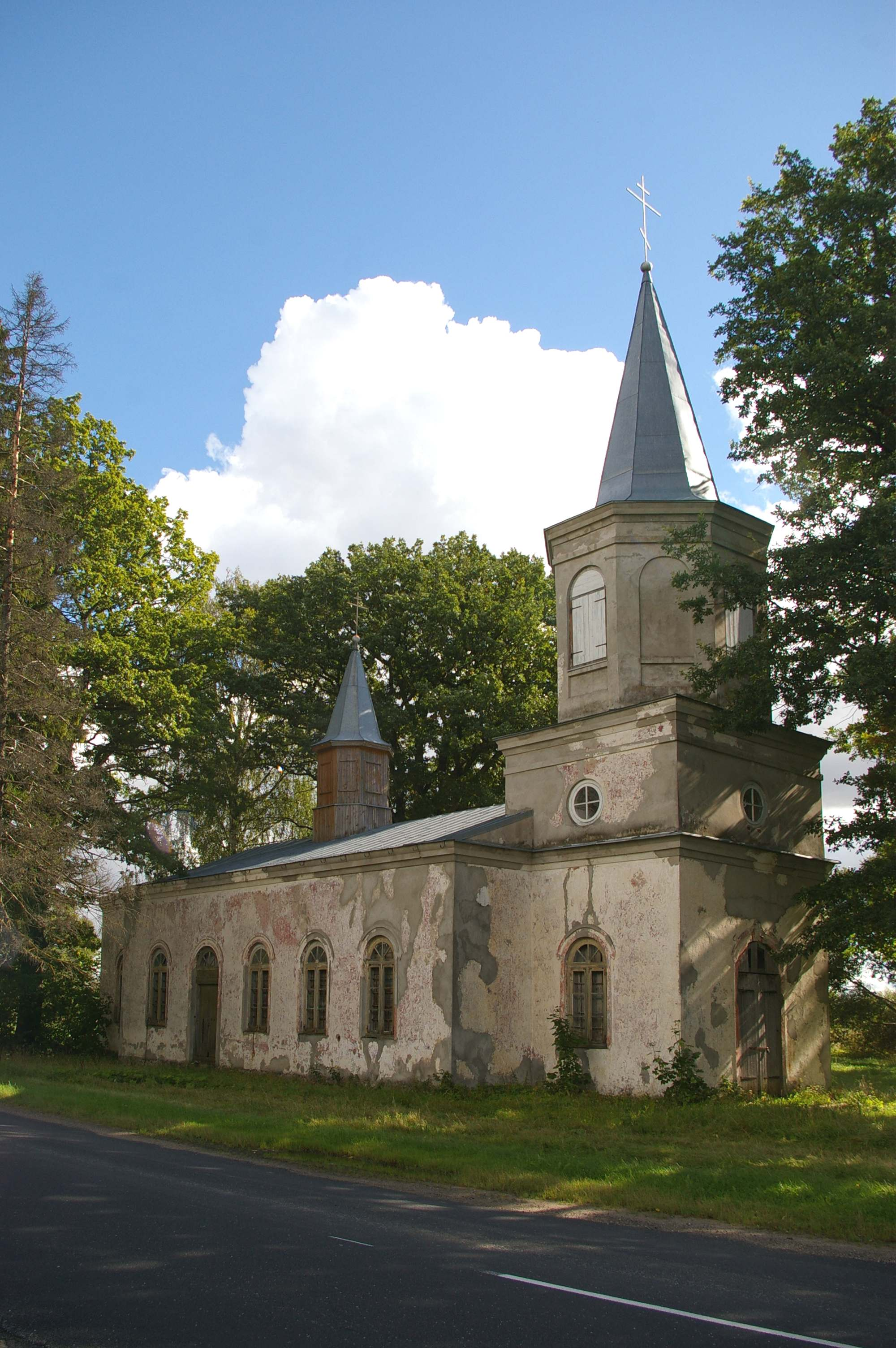
- Randivälja church
- Interactive map of Randivälja
- Country: Estonia
- County: Pärnu County
- Parish: Tori Parish
- Time zone: UTC+2 (EET)
  - Summer (DST): UTC+3 (EEST)

Randivälja is a village in Tori Parish, Pärnu County in southwestern Estonia.
