= Võlli =

Võlli may refer to several places in Estonia:

- Võlli, Pärnu County, village in Tori Parish, Pärnu County
- Võlli, Viljandi County, village in Suure-Jaani Parish, Viljandi County
