= Heinrich Aviksoo =

Estonian politician and activist

- Born: Heinrich Avikson; 18 December 1880; Tori Parish, Governorate of Livonia, Russian Empire
- Died: 10 April 1942 (aged 61); Sosva, Russian Soviet Federative Socialist Republic, Soviet Union
- Occupations: Politician, sports figure, journalist, educator
- Years active: 1900–1940
- Spouse: Rosalie Emilie Tauk
- Children: 3

Heinrich Aviksoo (18 December 1880 – 10 April 1942) was an Estonian educator, journalist, sports figure, and politician. In 1912, Aviksoo was a founder and the first chairman of the Viljandi JK Tulevik football club. He also served as the mayor of the town of Rakvere from 1930 until 1940.

== Early life ==
Heinrich Aviksoo was born Heinrich Avikson in Tori Parish, Pärnu County to Jaan and Anu Avikson (née Miil). He was the youngest of three children and only boy; his older sisters were Lisa and Maria. He had one older half-brother, Johan, from his father's previous marriage. He attended schools in Pärnu, where he excelled in athletics.

== Career ==
From 1899 to 1909, Aviksoo worked as a primary school teacher and then headmaster, and from 1909 until 1914, worked as an editor and journalist for several newspapers in Estonia, including Meie Kodumaas and Sakala. Aviksoo briefly worked as an accountant for the St. Petersburg Polytechnic Institute in Russia before returning to Estonia following the Estonian War of Independence.

An avid sportsman, Aviksoo was a founder and the first chairman of the Viljandi JK Tulevik football club in 1912, as well as the departmental head of a sporting club in Vändra.

In 1919, Aviksoo became involved in politics, first as a member of the Viru County municipal government. In 1924, he became the secretary of the Association of Municipalities and in 1930, became Mayor of Rakvere, representing the Patriotic League party; a position he held until 1940. He was also head of propaganda of the regional unit of the Estonian Defence League where he held the rank of major, then later colonel. Aviksoo's tenure as mayor saw large-scale construction added to the town, with a new stadium (Rakvere Linnastaadion), a hospital, a public swimming pool, a new gymnasium (school) designed by architect Alar Kotli, and several banks and community buildings erected, as well as military barracks. On 24 February 1940, Rakvere Theatre opened its doors to the public, and on 16 June 1940, St. Paul's Church in Rakvere was consecrated. The following day, the Red Army arrived.

== Imprisonment and death ==
Following the Soviet occupation of Estonia in 1940 during World War II, Aviksoo, like many other Estonian politicians and intellectuals, was arrested by the NKVD and placed into the gulag camp-system in 1941. He was transported to Sosva prison camp in Sverdlovsk Oblast in Russia, where he was executed by gunshot on 10 April 1942, aged 61.

== Personal life ==
Heinrich Aviksoo was married to Rosalie Emilie Tauk. The couple had three children: Ellen, Arnold, and Heljo. His only son, Arnold, was also arrested and spent many years within the gulag system, before being released in 1956.

== Acknowledgments ==
- Order of the Young Eagles
- Order of the White Cross of the Defense League
- Order of the Estonian Red Cross, II Class (1936)
- Order of the Cross of the Eagle, V Class (1938)
