= Kõrsa =

Village in Estonia

Coordinates: 58°25′N 24°42′E

- Village
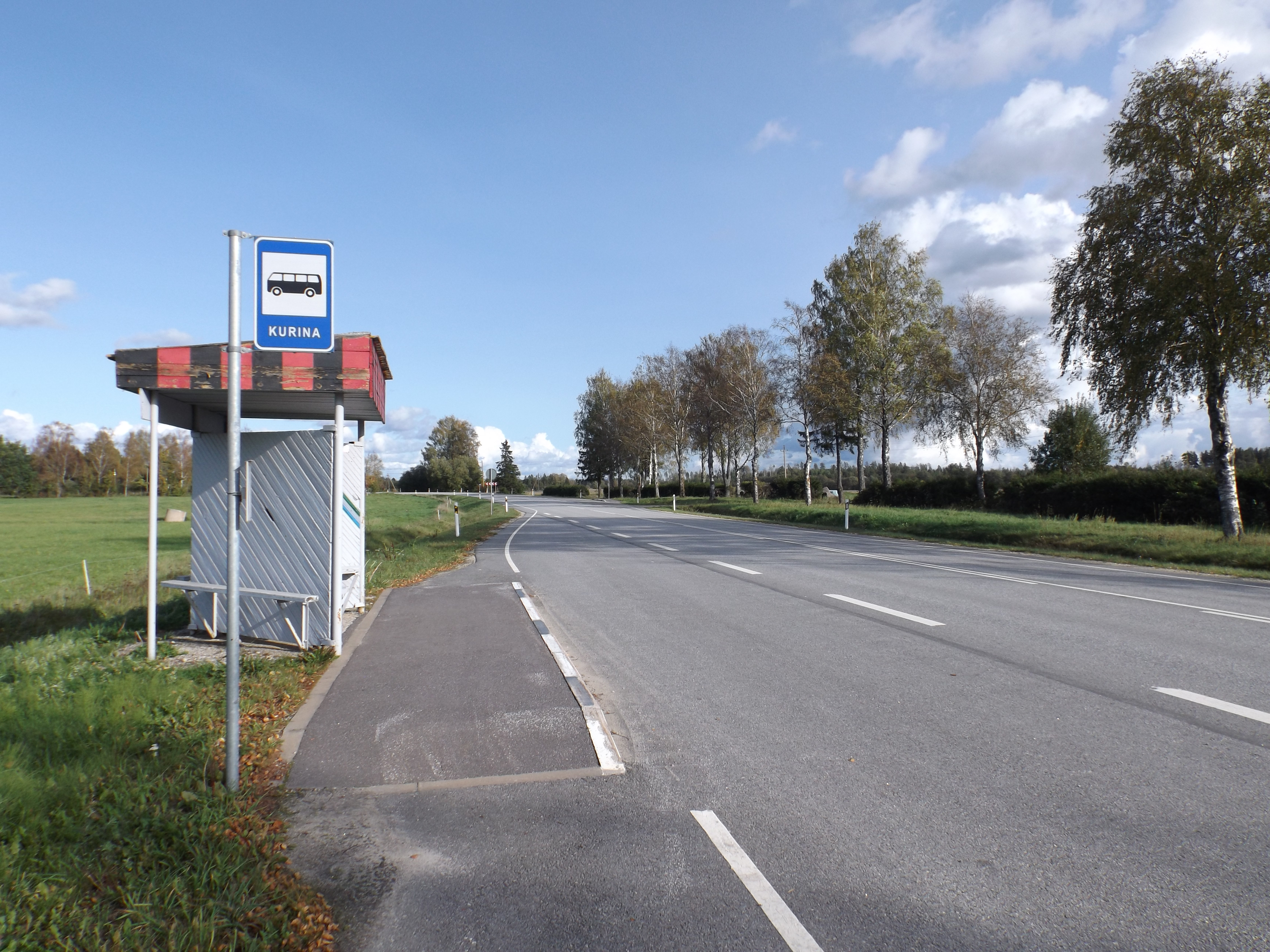
- Bus stop in Kõrsa
- Interactive map of Kõrsa
- Country: Estonia
- County: Pärnu County
- Parish: Tori Parish
- Time zone: UTC+2 (EET)
  - Summer (DST): UTC+3 (EEST)

Kõrsa is a village in Tori Parish, Pärnu County in southwestern Estonia.
