= Rätsepa =

Rätsepa may refer to several places in Estonia:

- Rätsepa, Tori Parish, village in Tori Parish, Pärnu County
- Rätsepa, Põhja-Pärnumaa Parish, village in Põhja-Pärnumaa Parish, Pärnu County
