= Muti, Estonia =

Village in Estonia

Coordinates: 58°32′N 24°50′E

Muti
- Village
- Interactive map of Muti
- Country: Estonia
- County: Pärnu County
- Parish: Tori Parish
- Time zone: UTC+2 (EET)
  - Summer (DST): UTC+3 (EEST)

Muti is a village in Tori Parish, Pärnu County in southwestern Estonia.
