= Aesoo =

Village in southwestern Estonia

Coordinates: 58°31′N 25°05′E

- Village
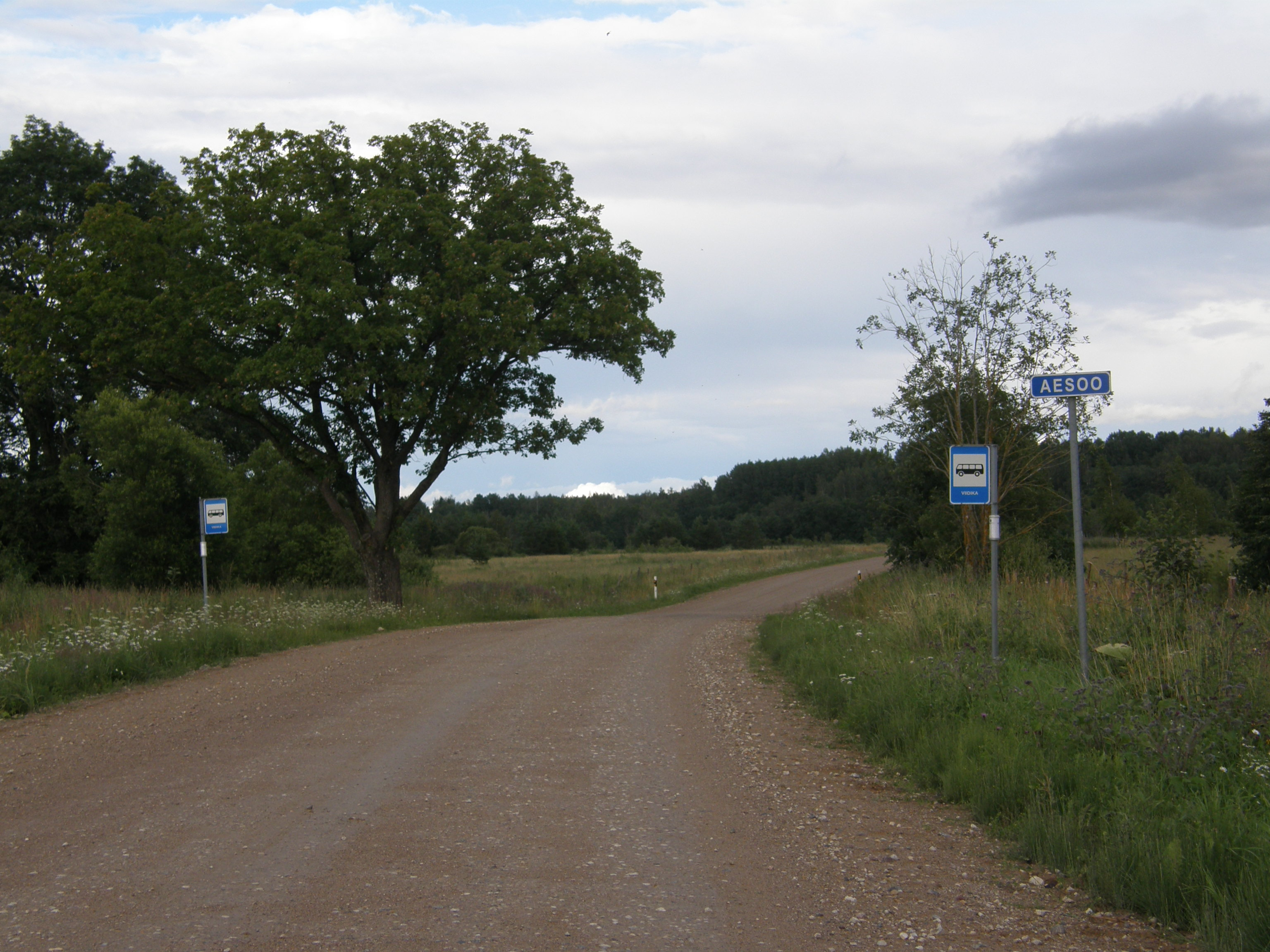
- Viidika bus stop in Aesoo
- Interactive map of Aesoo
- Country: Estonia
- County: Pärnu County
- Parish: Tori Parish
- Time zone: UTC+2 (EET)
  - Summer (DST): UTC+3 (EEST)

Aesoo is a village in Tori Parish, Pärnu County in southwestern Estonia.
