= Rätsepa, Tori Parish =

Village in Estonia

Coordinates: 58°29′16″N 24°55′29″E

Rätsepa
- Village
- Interactive map of Rätsepa
- Country: Estonia
- County: Pärnu County
- Parish: Tori Parish
- Time zone: UTC+2 (EET)
  - Summer (DST): UTC+3 (EEST)

Rätsepa is a village in Tori Parish, Pärnu County in southwestern Estonia.
