= Võlli, Pärnu County =

Village in Estonia

Coordinates: 58°27′05″N 24°51′37″E

Võlli
- Village
- Interactive map of Võlli
- Country: Estonia
- County: Pärnu County
- Parish: Tori Parish
- Time zone: UTC+2 (EET)
  - Summer (DST): UTC+3 (EEST)

Võlli is a village in Tori Parish, Pärnu County in southwestern Estonia.
