= Oore =

Village in Estonia

Coordinates: 58°27′41″N 24°45′28″E

- Village
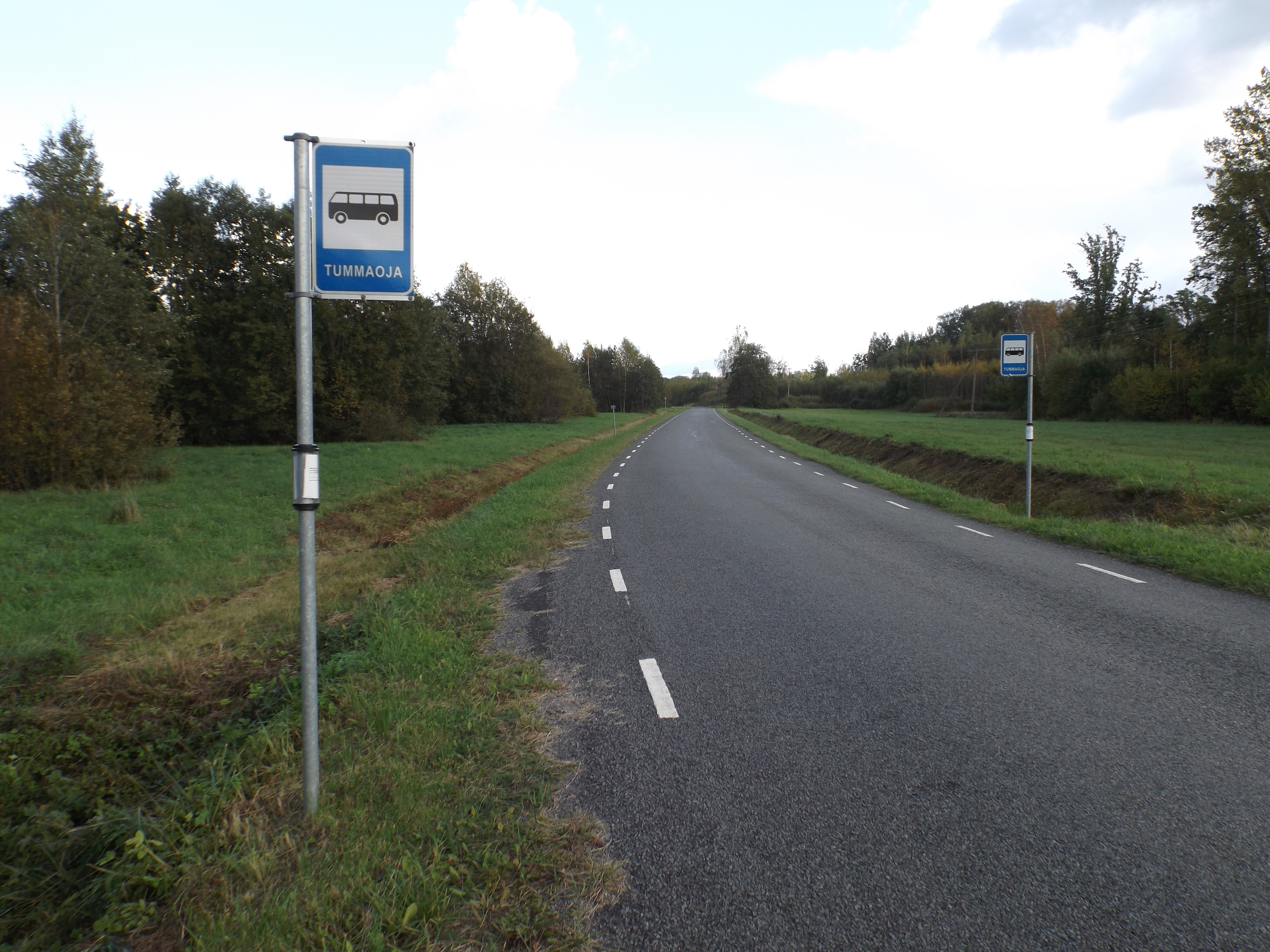
- Bus stop in Oore
- Interactive map of Oore
- Country: Estonia
- County: Pärnu County
- Parish: Tori Parish
- Time zone: UTC+2 (EET)
  - Summer (DST): UTC+3 (EEST)

Oore is a village in Tori Parish, Pärnu County in southwestern Estonia.
