= Tammiste, Pärnu County =

Village in Estonia

Coordinates: 58°23′01″N 24°36′09″E

Tammiste
- Village
- Interactive map of Tammiste
- Country: Estonia
- County: Pärnu County
- Parish: Tori Parish
- Time zone: UTC+2 (EET)
  - Summer (DST): UTC+3 (EEST)

Tammiste is a village in Tori Parish, Pärnu County in southwestern Estonia.

It had a station on the Tallinn - Pärnu railway line operated by Elron, which closed in December 2018.
