= Pulli, Pärnu County =

Village in Estonia

Coordinates: 58°25′07″N 24°39′28″E

- Village
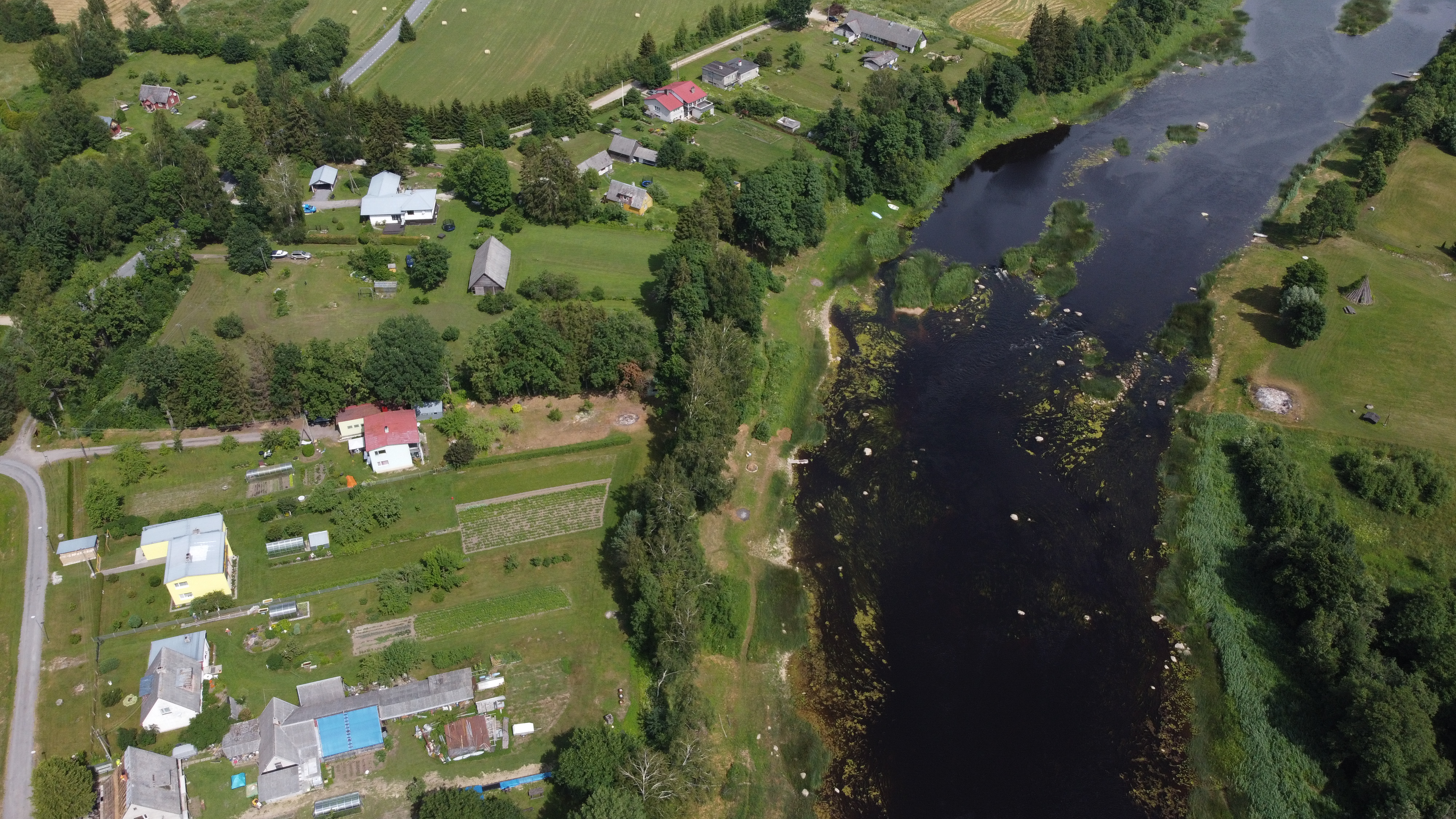
- Interactive map of Pulli, Pärnu County
- Country: Estonia
- County: Pärnu County
- Parish: Tori Parish
- Time zone: UTC+2 (EET)
  - Summer (DST): UTC+3 (EEST)

Drone video of settlement and village of Pulli

Pulli is a village in Tori Parish, Pärnu County in southwestern Estonia.

Prior to the administrative reform of Estonian local governments in 2017, the village was part of Sauga Parish. Pulli settlement is one of the oldest known human settlements in Estonia, dating to around 9000 years BC, during the Mesolithic period.

Pulli has a railway station on the Edelaraudtee's western route.
