= Selja, Tori Parish =

Village in Estonia

Coordinates: 58°30′28″N 24°47′51″E

Selja
- Village
- Interactive map of Selja
- Country: Estonia
- County: Pärnu County
- Parish: Tori Parish
- Time zone: UTC+2 (EET)
  - Summer (DST): UTC+3 (EEST)

Selja is a village in Tori Parish, Pärnu County in southwestern Estonia.

Tori railway station on the Edelaraudtee's western route is located in Selja.
