= Tori Parish =

Municipality of Estonia (2017)

Coordinates: 58°29′N 24°49′E

Tori Parish Tori vald
- Municipality of Estonia
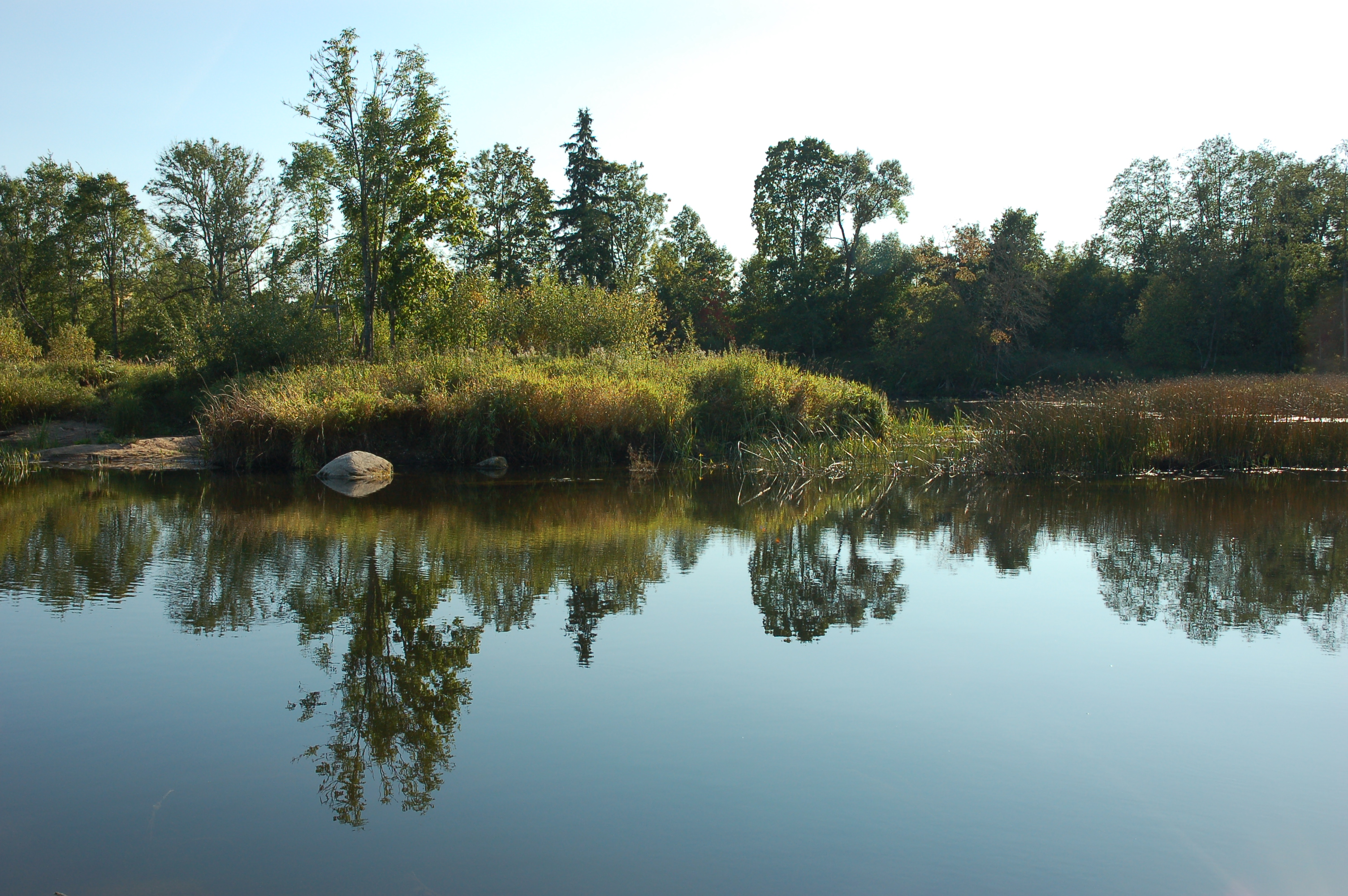
- Iisaar "sacred grove" island

- Flag Coat of arms

- Tori Parish within Pärnu County.
- Country: Estonia
- County: Pärnu County
- Administrative centre: Sindi

Area
  - Total: 611 km^{2} (236 sq mi)

Population (01.01.2020)
  - Total: 11,879
  - Density: 19.4/km^{2} (50.4/sq mi)
- ISO 3166 code: EE-809
- Website: www.torivald.ee

Tori is a municipality located in Pärnu County.

== Settlements ==
Towns

Sindi

Small boroughs

Are, Tori, Sauga

Villages

Aesoo - Eametsa - Eavere - Elbi - Elbu - Jõesuu - Kiisa - Kildemaa - Kilksama - Kõrsa - Kuiaru - Kurena - Lepplaane - Levi - Mannare - Muraka - Murru - Muti - Niidu - Nurme - Oore - Parisselja - Pärivere - Piistaoja - Pulli - Räägu - Randivälja - Rätsepa - Rütavere - Riisa - Selja - Suigu - Taali - Tabria - Tammiste - Tohera - Urge - Urumarja - Vainu - Võlla - Võlli

In terms of religion in the 2021 census of at least 15-years old residents 9.8% of the residents of the parish declared themselves Lutheran, 7.3% declared themselves Orthodox, 1.7% other Christians. The majority of residents of the parish, 78.8% declared themselves religiously unaffiliated. 1.3% of the population followed other religions or did not specify their religious affiliation.

== Notable people ==
- Heinrich Aviksoo (1880 in Tori Parish – 1942), journalist, sports figure, politician and Mayor of Rakvere from 1930 to 1940.
- Theodor Pool (1890 in Piistaoja – 1942) politician, agronomist and writer; Minister of Agriculture, from 1920 to 1929.
- Elvy Kalep (1899 Taali – 1989), aviator and the country's first female pilot
- Renee Teppan (born 1993 in Selja), volleyball player, a member of the Estonia men's national volleyball team
