= Pärnu (river) =

River in Estonia

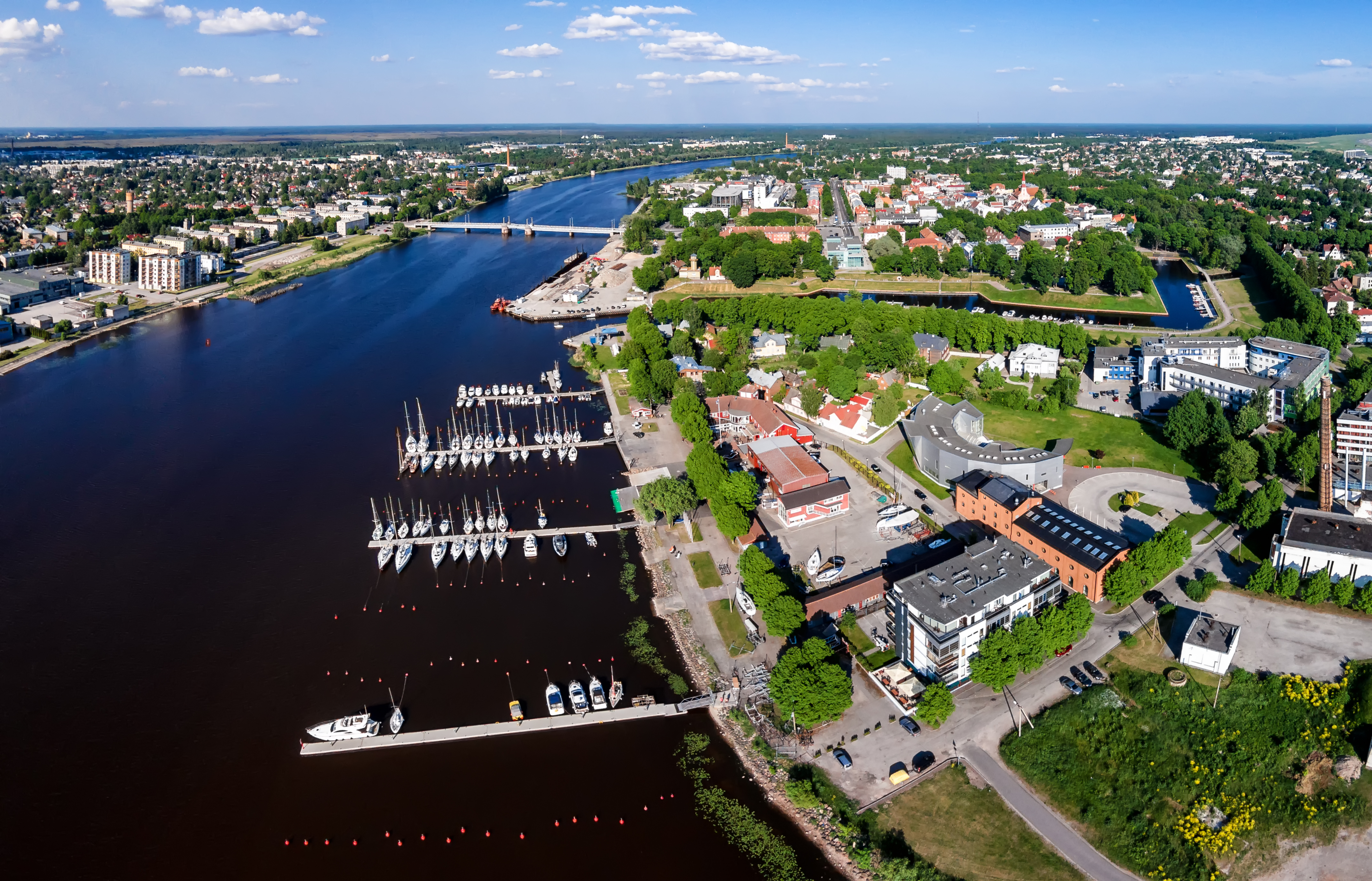
- The river in Pärnu, near its discharge into the Baltic Sea

Location
- Country: Estonia

Physical characteristics
- Source
  - location: Central Estonian Plain
  - elevation: 76.2 m (250 ft)
- Mouth
  - location: Gulf of Riga
  - coordinates: 58°22′38″N 24°28′34″E
- Length: 144 km (89 mi)
- Basin size: 6,920 km^{2} (2,670 sq mi)
- Discharge
  - average: 64.4 m^{3}/s (2,270 cu ft/s)

The Pärnu (Estonian: Pärnu jõgi) is a river in Estonia. It drains into Pärnu Bay, which is an inlet of the Gulf of Riga. At 144 km, it is one of the longest rivers in Estonia, with a basin area of 6,920 km^{2} and an average discharge of 64.4 m³/s.

== Description ==
The Pärnu is the second longest river in Estonia at 144 kilometres (89 mi), and one of only ten rivers in the country which is longer than 100 kilometres (62 mi). Its catchment area is 6,920 square kilometres (2,670 sq mi), occupying roughly one-sixth of the landmass of Estonia and one of only 15 catchment areas of Estonian rivers which exceeds 1,000 square kilometres (390 sq mi). Its sources are in the karst upland of Pandivere, in north-eastern Estonia, and its main tributaries join the river from the upland of Sakala. Due to its length, the river Pärnu passes through most of the landscape types found in Estonia. The rivers' surroundings are dominated by agriculture and its upper reaches in Järva County is considered some of the best arable land in Estonia. In the area around Paide town, the river flows through forests and wetlands. It discharges into Pärnu Bay; the city of Pärnu lies where the river enters the sea.

=== Geology ===
The catchment area of the river is roughly composed of Lower Silurian deposits to the north of the river from the sea to where it merges with the Navesti, and from there north of Navesti, and to the south of this line is composed of largely Middle Devonian deposits. Near Tori, sandstone outcroppings, cliffs and caves border the river. In its northern and eastern course, the river runs over a thin (from 5 metres [16 ft] down to as little as 1 metre [3.3 ft]) layer of topsoil, while closer to the sea the topsoil can be as deep as 60 metres (200 ft).

=== Hydrology ===
The variations in runoff from the river are great, due at least in part to the fact that the river catchment area lacks any large lakes. For this reason, and due to its meandering form, the river has been called the "Estonian Mississippi". The river typically floods at spring, but also after heavy rains in autumn and summer, and the maximum amount of recorded water in the runoff at a hydrological station in Oore has been measured to be more than 100 times that of the minimum. The flat landscape aggravates the effects of flooding, and large stretches along the river are characterised by flood meadows, flood plain forests and swamp forests. Flood plain forests of the type found by the shores of the river Pärnu are uncommon in Estonia and in the rest of Europe, where few have been preserved. The flood meadows along the river have decreased in numbers due to the lack of tending to them; in recent years however, efforts have been made to restore several of them. The Sindi Dam on the main-stem Parnu was removed in 2018–2019. Other dams on the Parnu will be removed in the years ahead. The Parnu River dam removals are financed in cooperation with the Estonian Government and the European Union. Undoubtedly, Atlantic Salmon and other fish species will recover in the years ahead.

=== Culture ===
The towns of Pärnu, Paide, Tori, and Türi are all located on the banks of the river Pärnu. The river has been a focal point for human activity in the area for a long time; the oldest discovered settlement in Estonia has been discovered by the river near the town of Sindi and has been dated to circa 7,500 BC.

== Gallery ==
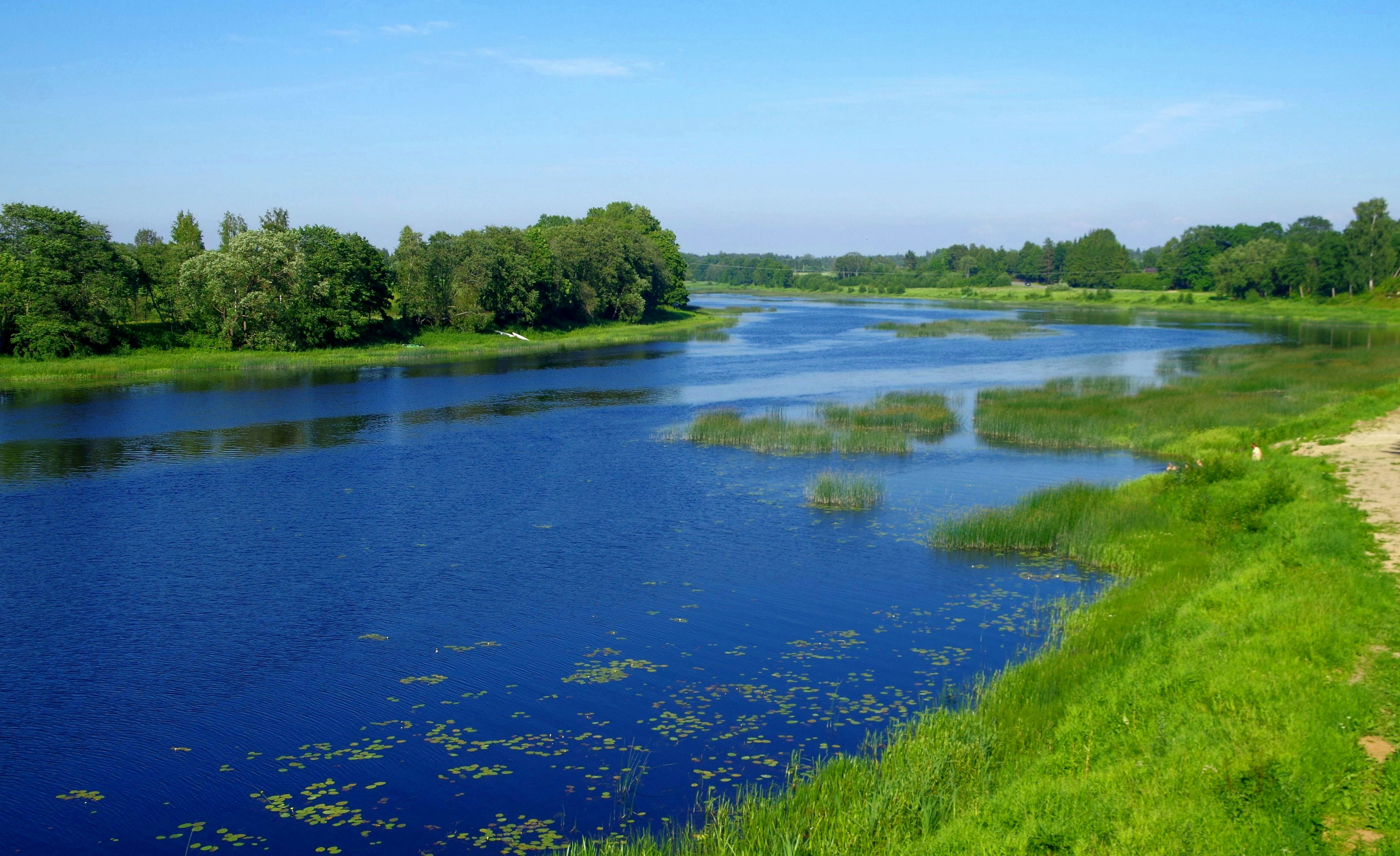
The river in Tori

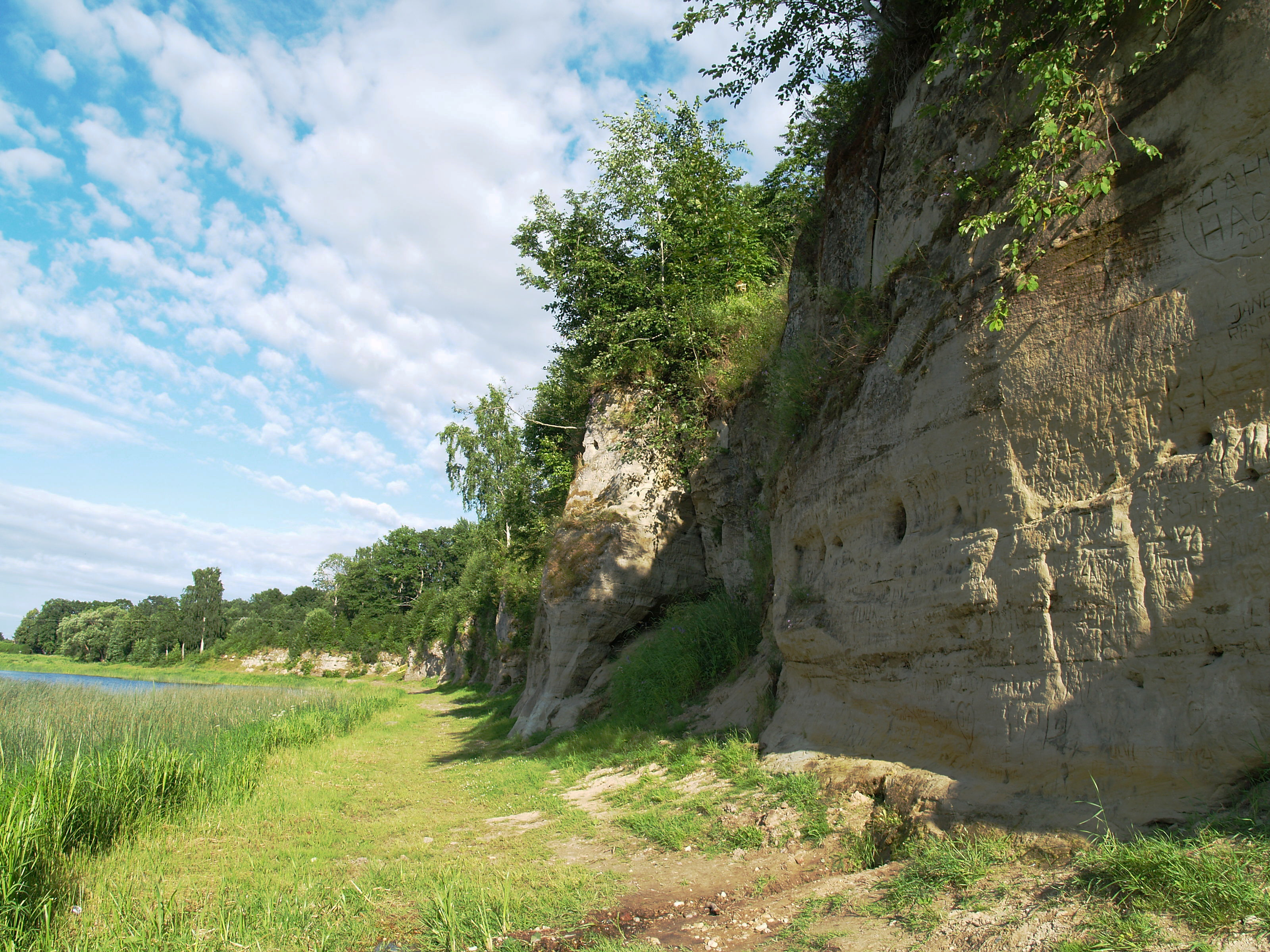
Sandstone cliffs near Tori

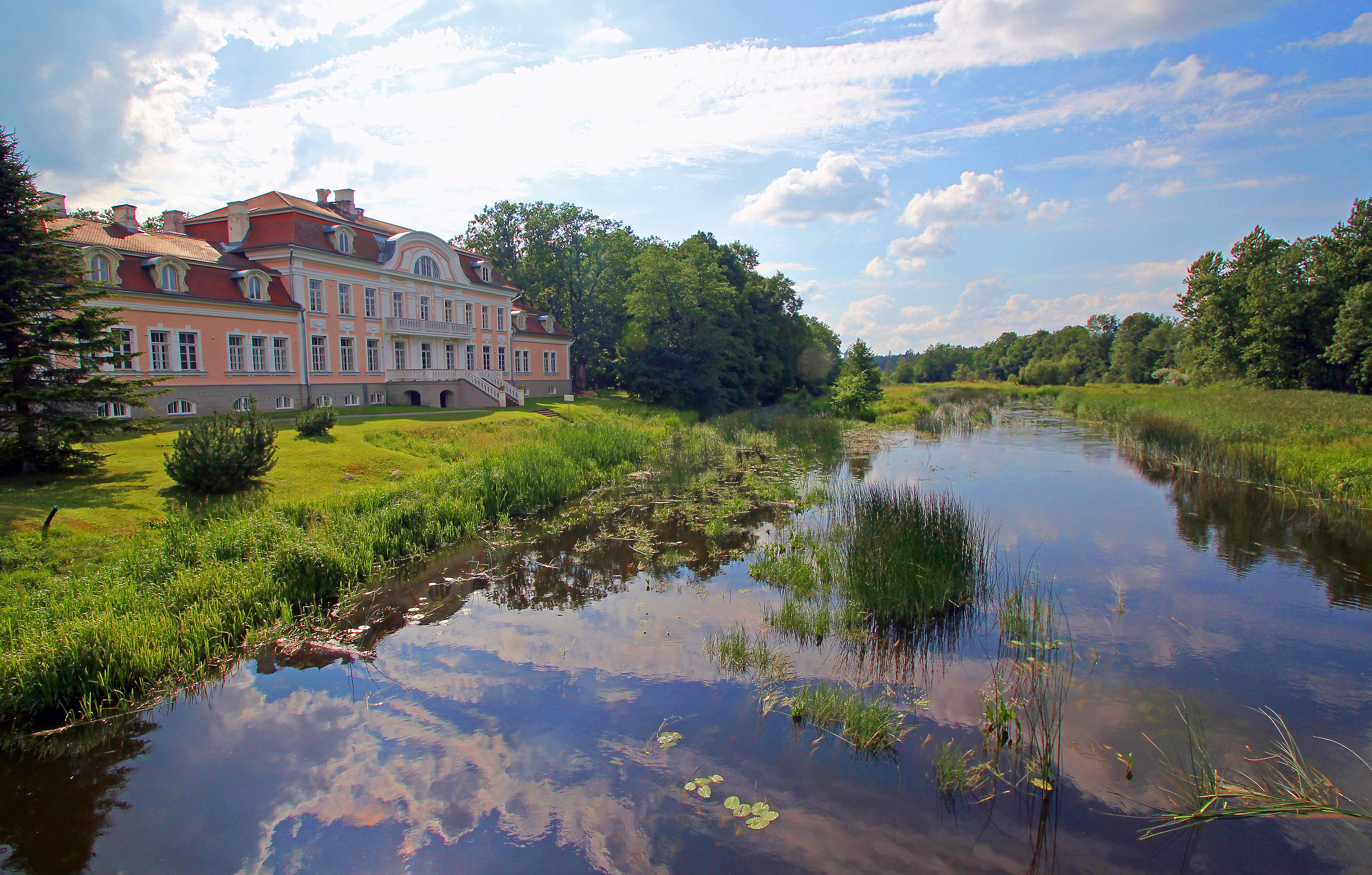
The river as it flows past the manor house in Laupa

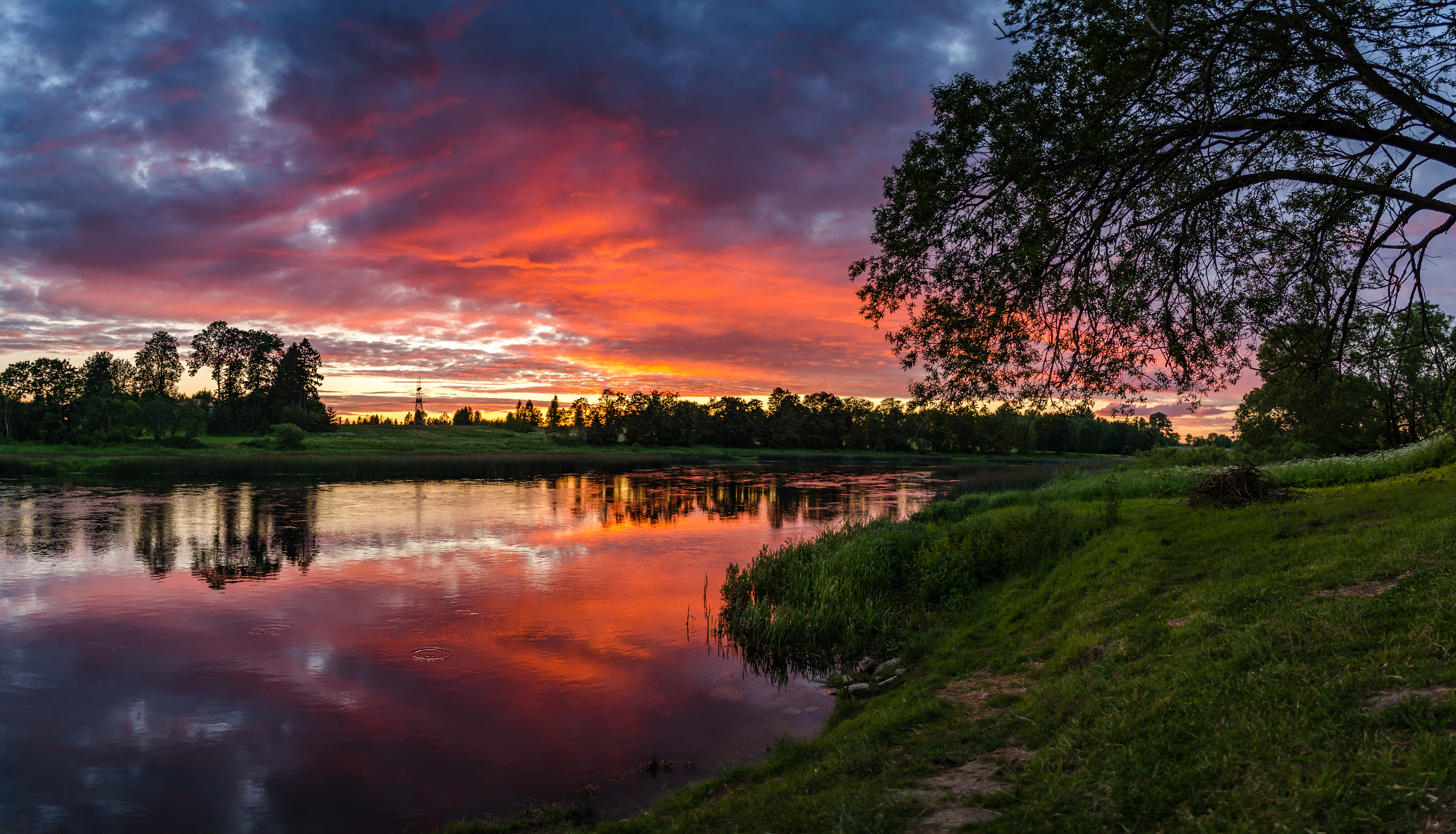
The river near Sindi

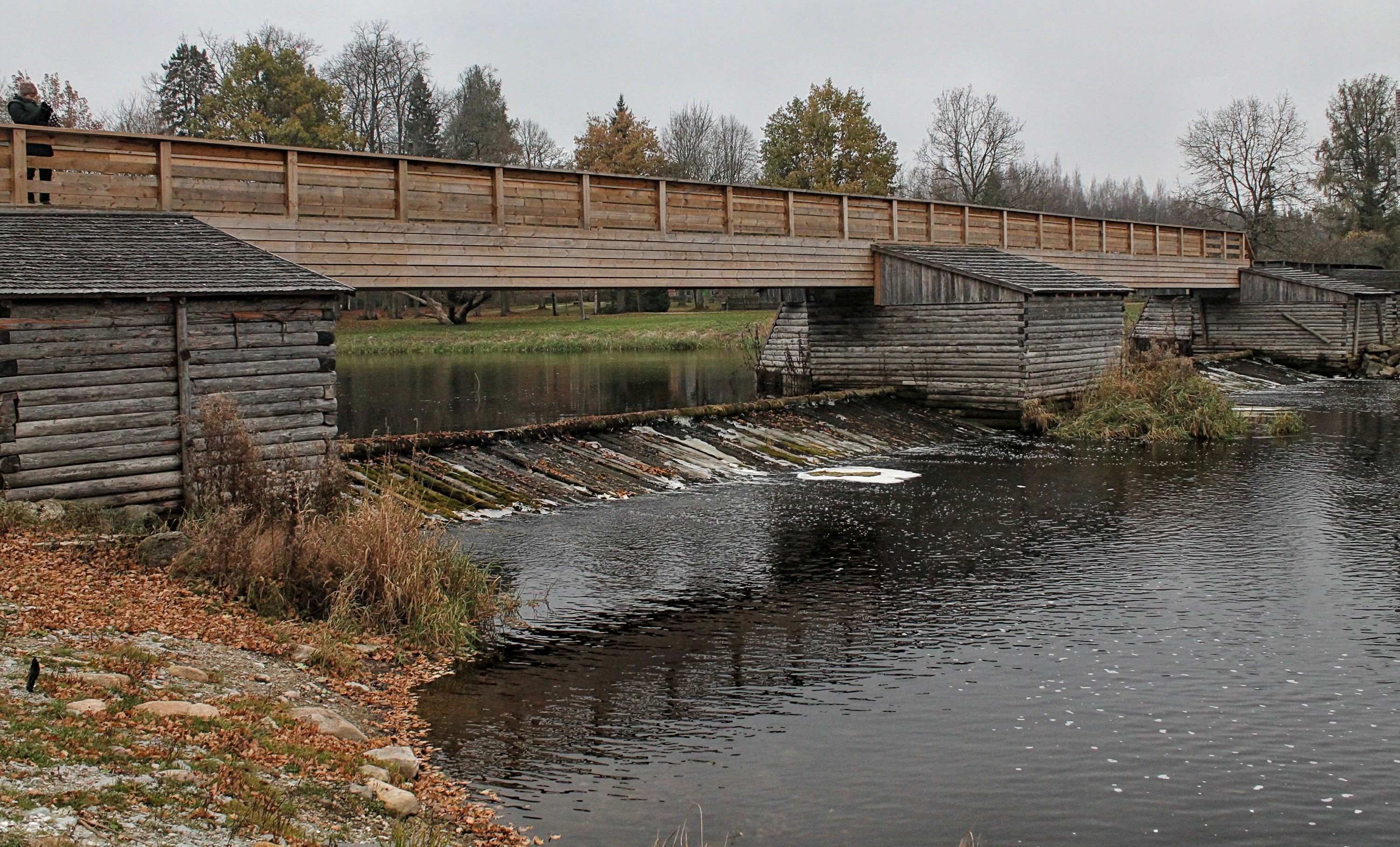
The river in its middle course in Kurgja
