= Uduvere =

Village in Estonia

Coordinates: 58°20′22″N 22°34′14″E

- Village
- Interactive map of Uduvere
- Country: Estonia
- County: Saare County
- Parish: Saaremaa Parish
- Time zone: UTC+2 (EET)
  - Summer (DST): UTC+3 (EEST)

Uduvere is a village in Saaremaa Parish, Saare County, on the island of Saaremaa, Estonia.

Before the administrative reform in 2017, the village was in Lääne-Saare Parish.

A village named Uduvere was the home for a fictional character Kärna Ärni portrayed by Sulev Nõmmik.
