= Pärnu County =

County of Estonia

Coordinates: 58°25′N 24°35′E

Pärnu County Pärnumaa
- County
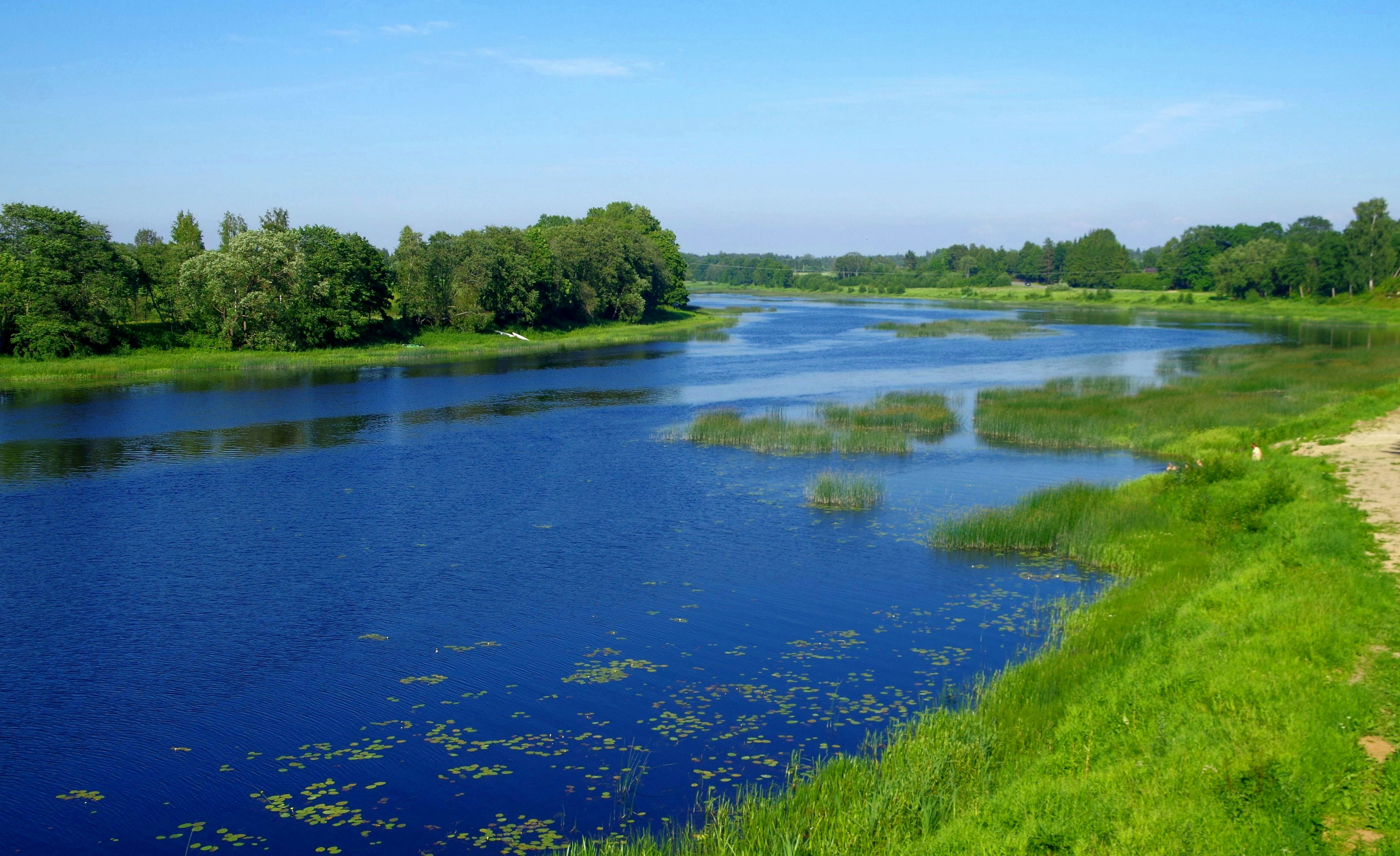

- Flag Coat of arms

- Country: Estonia
- Capital: Pärnu

Area
  - Total: 4,806.68 km^{2} (1,855.87 sq mi)

Population (2022)
  - Total: 85,705
  - Rank: 4th
  - Density: 17.830/km^{2} (46.181/sq mi)

Ethnicity
  - Estonians: 89.5%
  - Russians: 6.8%
  - other: 3.3%

GDP
  - Total: €1.587 billion (2022)
  - Per capita: €18,334 (2022)
- ISO 3166 code: EE-68
- Vehicle registration: F

Pärnu County (Estonian: Pärnu maakond or Pärnumaa; German: Kreis Pernau) is one of 15 counties of Estonia. It is located in the southwestern part of the country, on the coast of the Gulf of Riga, and it borders Lääne and Rapla counties to the north, Järva and Viljandi counties to the east, and Latvia to the south. In 2022, Pärnu County had a population constituting 6.4% of the total population of Estonia.

Pärnu County is the largest county of Estonia in terms of land area.

== History ==
In Pärnu County, there is the oldest known human settlement in Estonia, which is located near the village of Pulli on the banks of the Pärnu River, known as the Pulli settlement. It dates back to 8500 BCE in the Mesolithic historical period.

=== County government ===
The administrative reform in Estonia abolished county governments by the end of 2017. Before that, counties were led by a governor, who was appointed by the Government of Estonia for a term of five years.

Previous county governors:

- 1993–2009: Toomas Kivimägi
- 2010–2015: Andres Metsoja
- 2015–2017: Kalev Kaljuste

== Tourism ==
The city of Pärnu is a popular holiday resort for Estonians and also for non-Estonians, e.g., from Finland, Latvia, Germany, Sweden, Lithuania and other countries.

== Municipalities ==
The county is subdivided into municipalities. There is one urban municipality (Estonian: linnad – towns) and six rural municipalities (Estonian: vallad – parishes) in Pärnu County.

Rank	Municipality	Type	Population (2018)	Area km^{2}	Density
1	Häädemeeste Parish	Rural	4,985	494	10.1
2	Kihnu Parish	Rural	702	17	41.3
3	Lääneranna Parish	Rural	5,494	1,352	4.1
4	Põhja-Pärnumaa Parish	Rural	8,435	1,013	8.3
5	Pärnu	Urban	51,649	855	60.4
6	Saarde Parish	Rural	4,722	1,065	4.4
7	Tori Parish	Rural	11,694	611	19.1

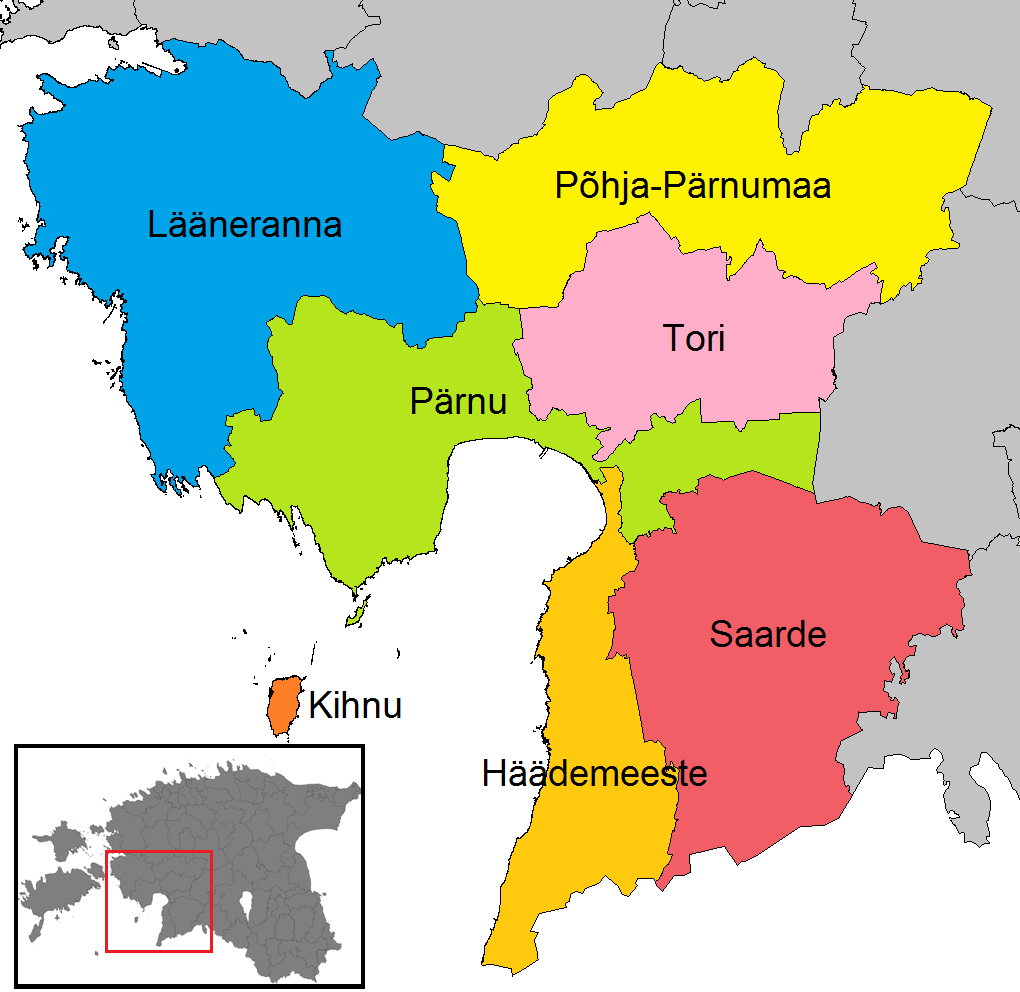
Municipalities of Pärnu County (since 2017)

== Religion ==
The following congregations of the Estonian Evangelical Lutheran Church (EELC) operate in Pärnu County under Pärnu Deanery of EELC: Pärnu, Audru, Häädemeeste, Pärnu-St. Jacob's, Saarde, Sindi, Tahkuranna, Tori, Tõstamaa, Treimani, and Vändra. The congregations of Hanila, Karuse, Kirbla, Lihula, Mihkli, and Varbla are under the administration of the Lääne Deanery of the EELC.

Regarding Eastern Orthodoxy, there is under the administration of the Estonian Apostolic Orthodox Church Kergu, Uduvere, Uue-Virtsu, and Vändra congreations. An Orthodox congregation in the city of Pärnu operates under the jurisdiction of the Estonian Orthodox Church of the Moscow Patriarchate.

Baptist congregations operating in Pärnu County: Pärnu Salem, Pärnu Immanuel's, Pärnu Salt and Light Congregation, Suigu, and Kilingi-Nõmme.

A congregation belonging to the Catholic Church in Estonia operating in Pärnu County is the Congregation of St. John the Apostle in the city of Pärnu.

There are also congregations of other Christian churches in the county.

Religious affiliations in Pärnu County, census 2000–2021*
Religion	2000		2011		2021	
Religion	Number	%	Number	%	Number	%
Christianity	17,466	23.7	13,425	19.2	12,850	17.8
—Orthodox Christians	5,473	7.4	5,008	7.2	5,030	7.0
—Lutherans	10,899	14.8	7,274	10.4	6,590	9.2
—Catholics	208	0.2	157	0.2	170	0.2
—Baptists	323	0.4	219	0.3	180	0.2
—Jehovah's Witnesses	159	0.2	198	0.2	170	0.2
—Pentecostals	216	0.2	151	0.2	140	0.1
—Old Believers	9	0.01	14	0.02	-	-
—Methodists	71	0.09	54	0.07	90	0.1
—Adventists	108	0.1	77	0.1	60	0.08
—Other Christians	-	-	273	0.3	420	0.5
Islam	28	0.03	32	0.05	150	0.2
Buddhism	-	-	81	0.1	150	0.2
Other religions**	359	0.4	576	0.2	1,020	1.4
No religion	30,849	42.0	45,062	64.7	49,220	68.4
Not stated***	24,785	33.7	10,412	14.9	8,510	11.8
Total population*	73,487		69,587		71,950	
*The censuses of Estonia count the religious affiliations of the population older than 15 years of age. ".

== Gallery ==
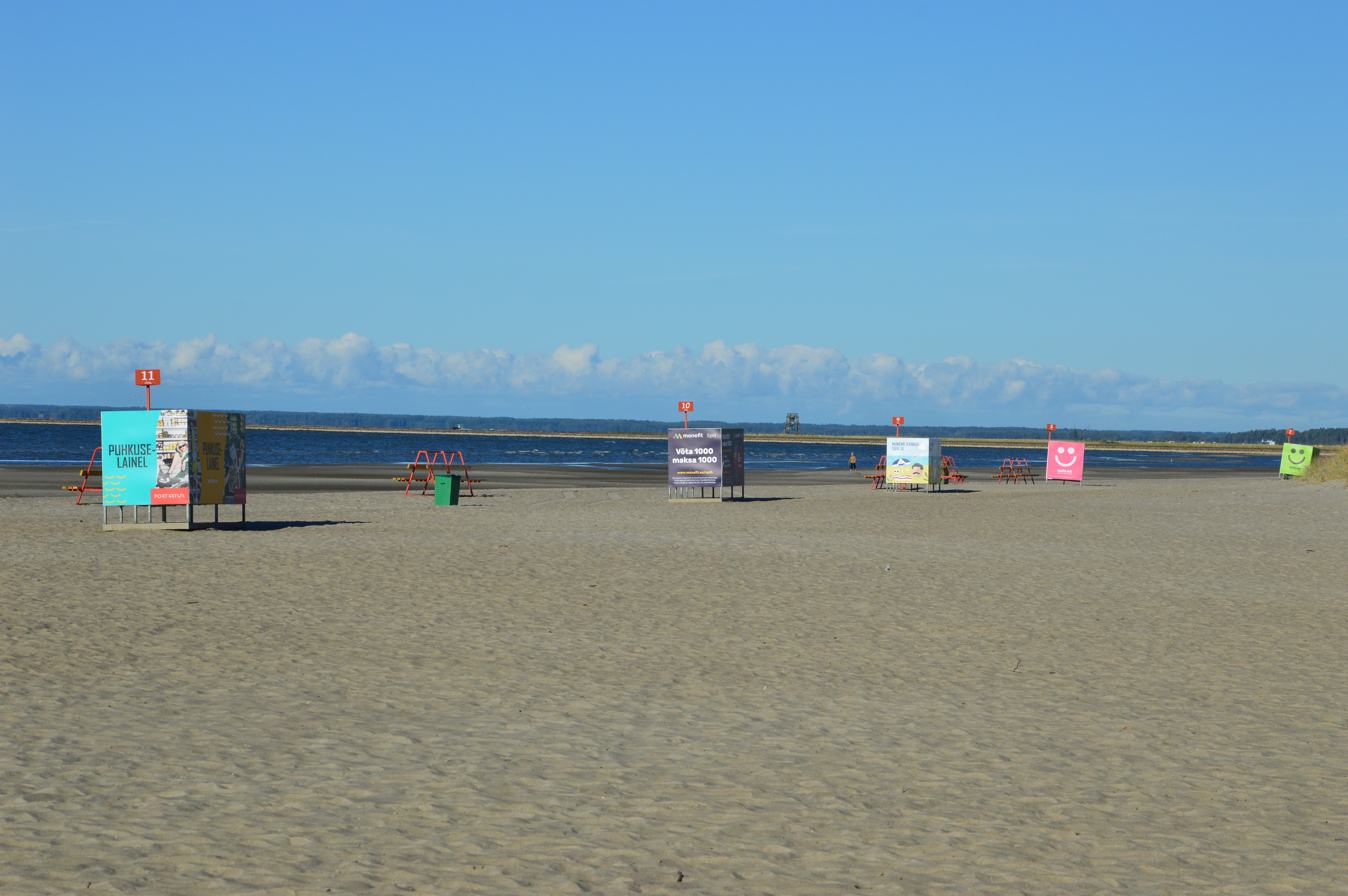
Pärnu beach

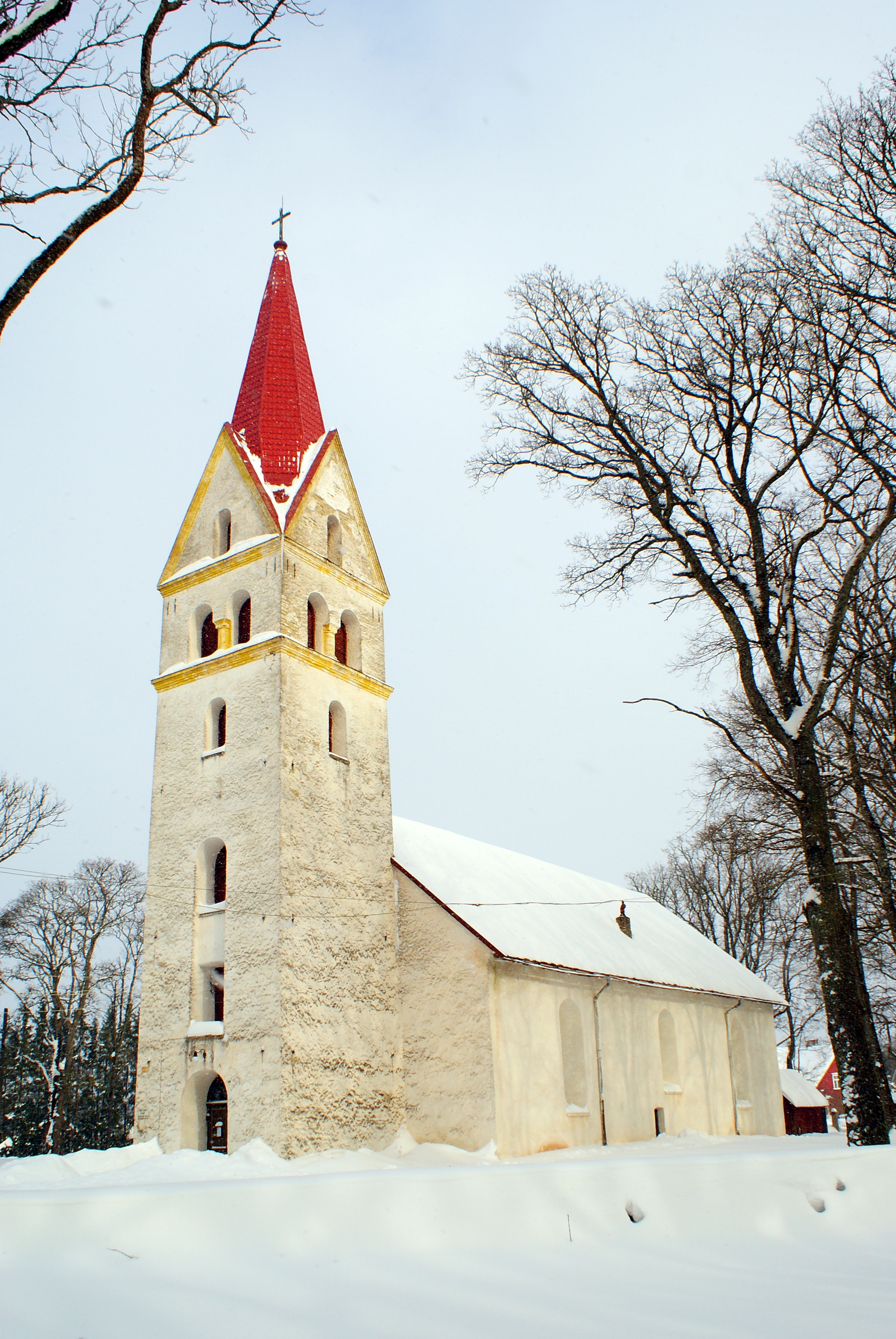
Pärnu-Jaagupi church

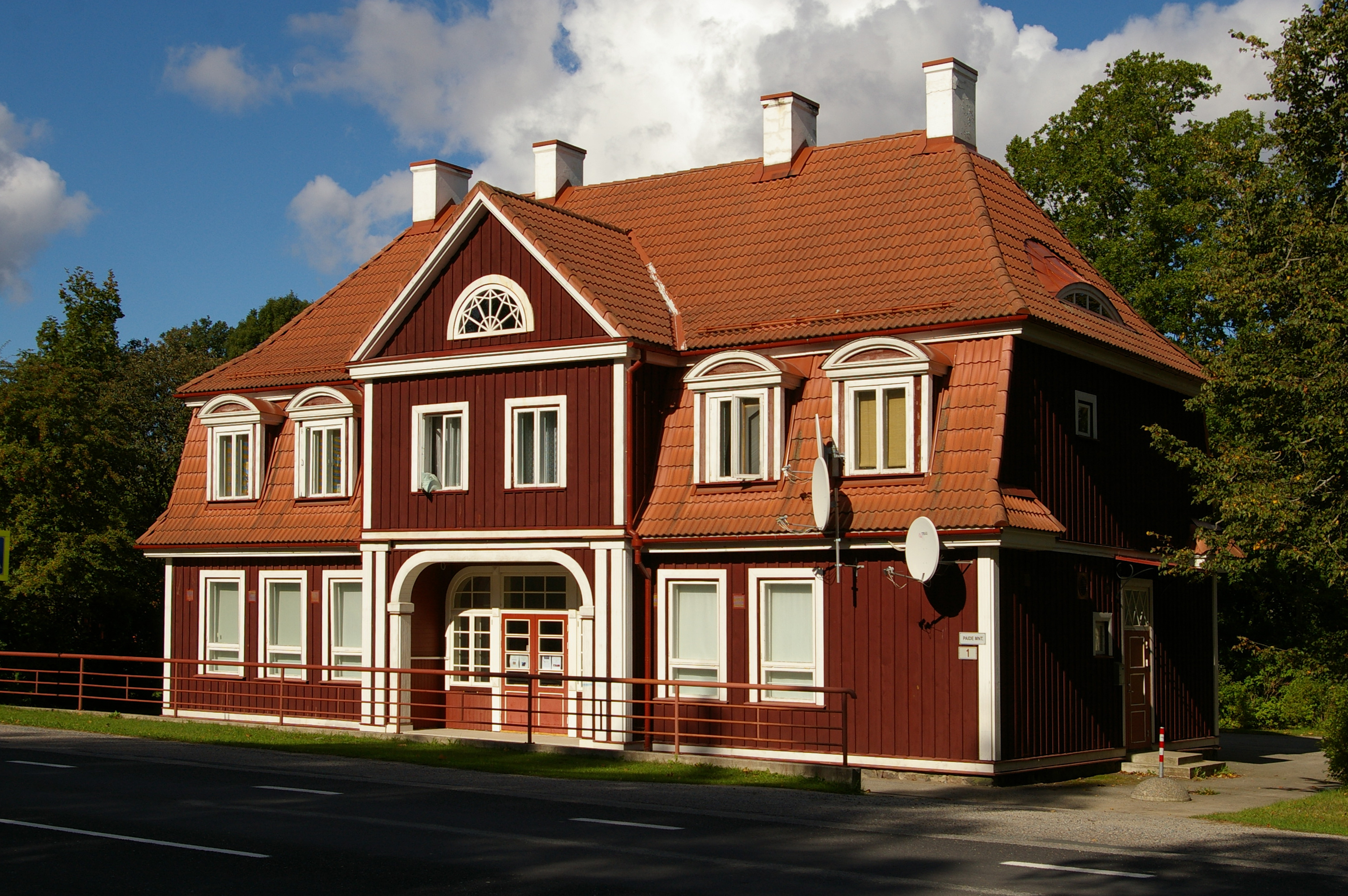
Sindi railway station

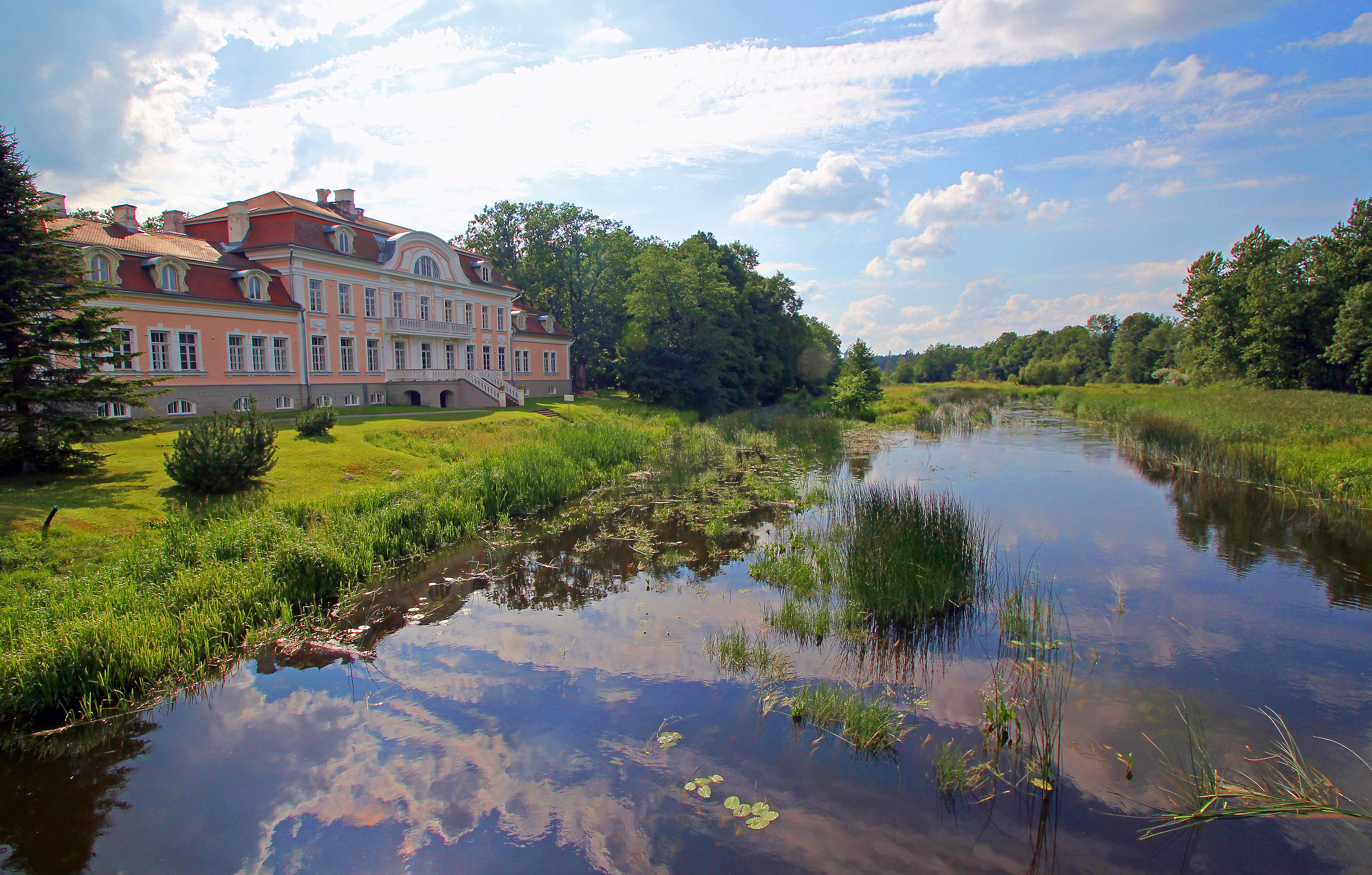
Laupa manor on the Pärnu river

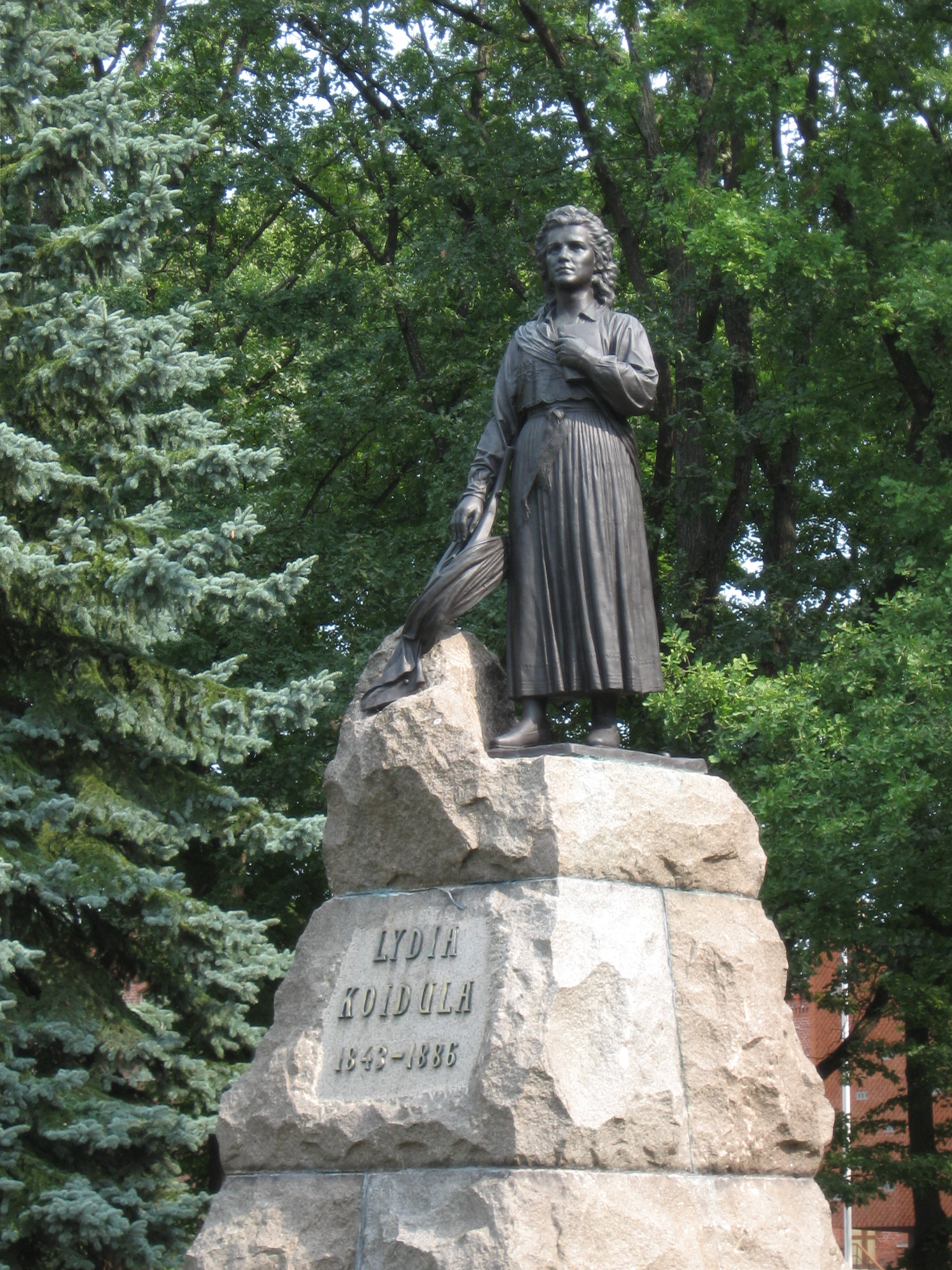
Monument to Estonian poet Lydia Koidula in Pärnu

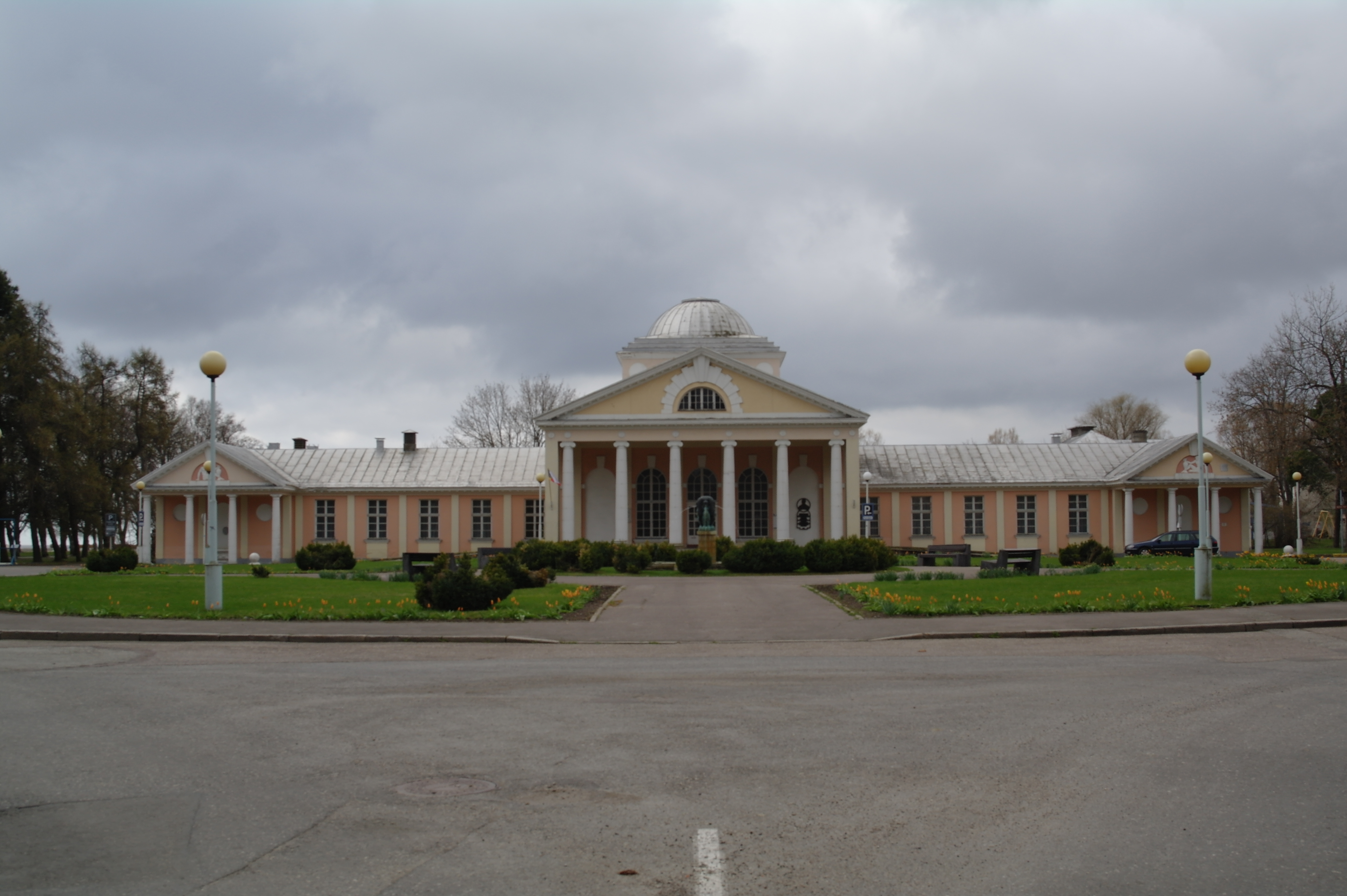
Pärnu mud baths and spa

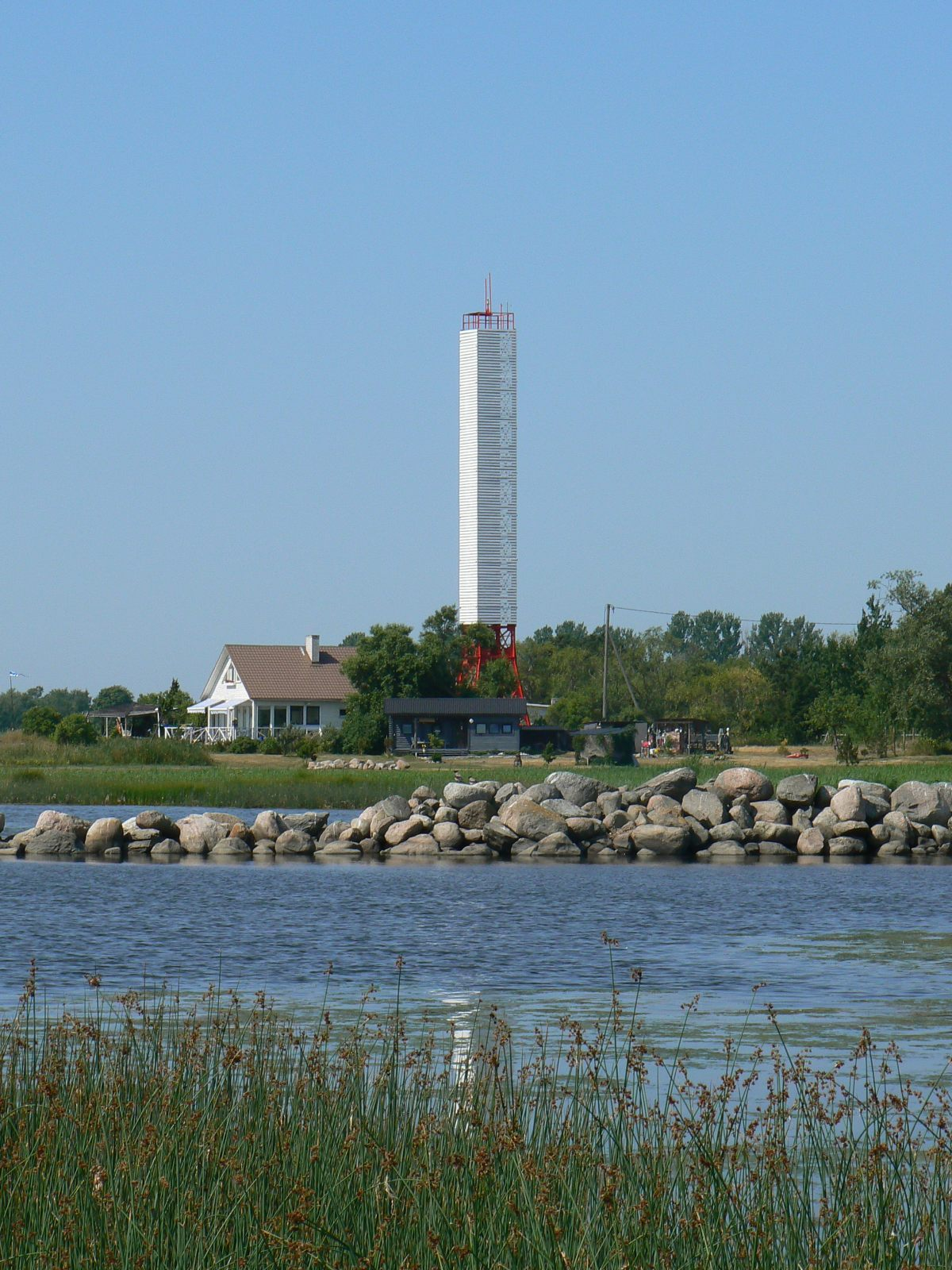
Liu lighthouse in Audru Parish

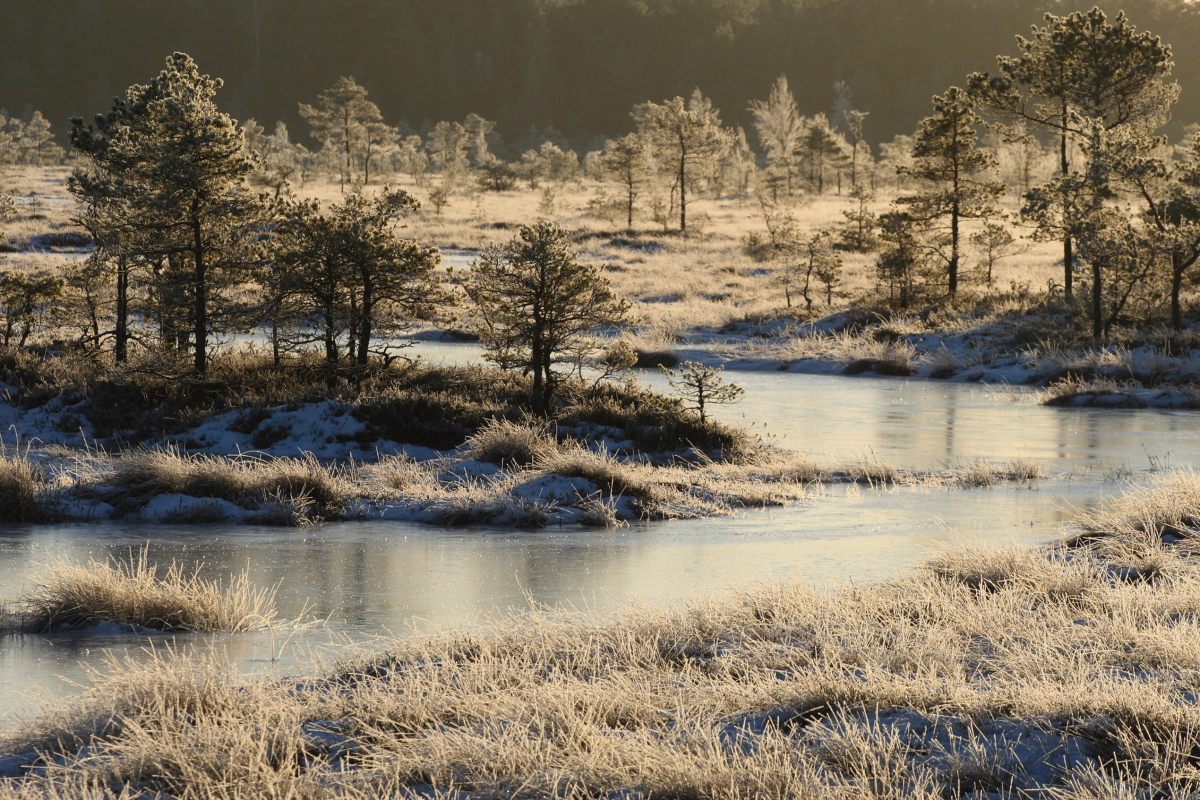
Riisa bog in Soomaa National Park

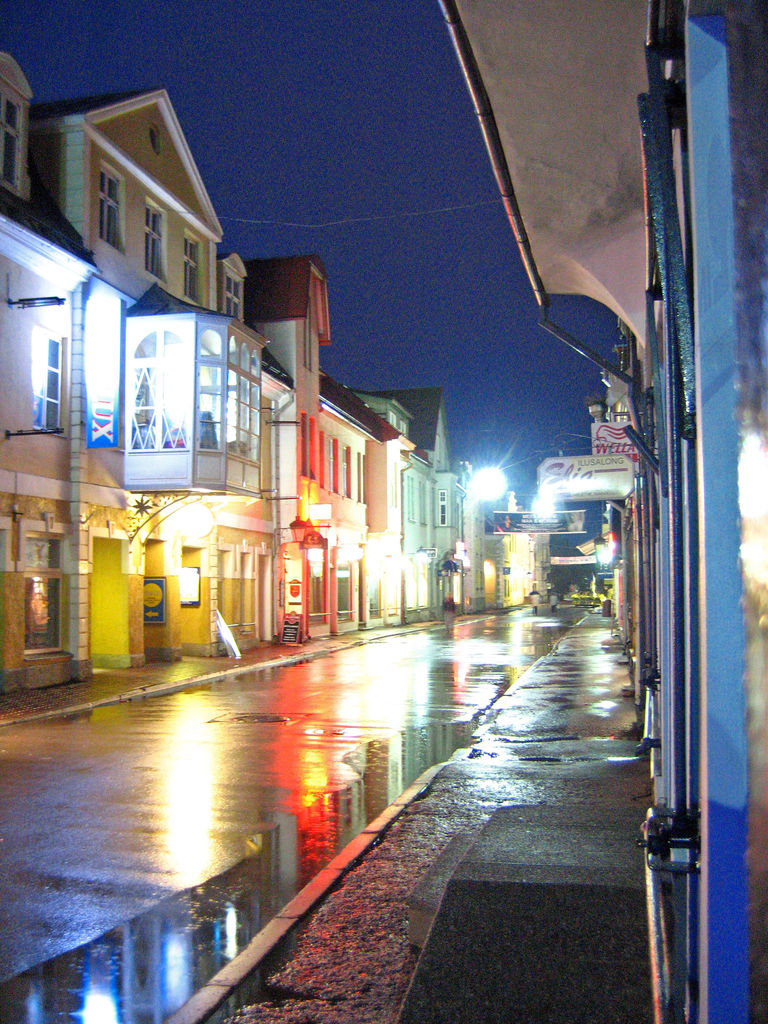
Downtown Pärnu at night

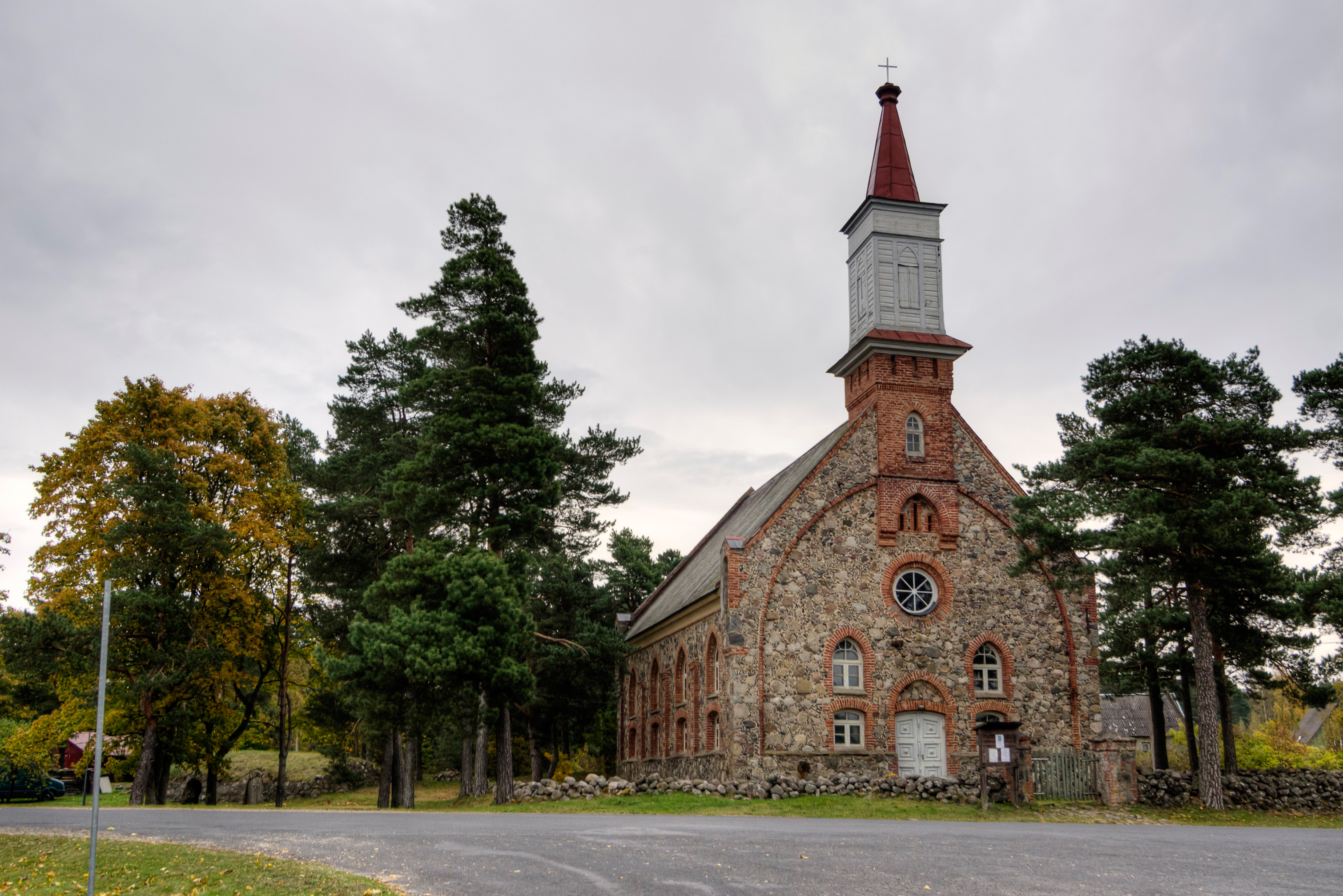
Häädemeeste church

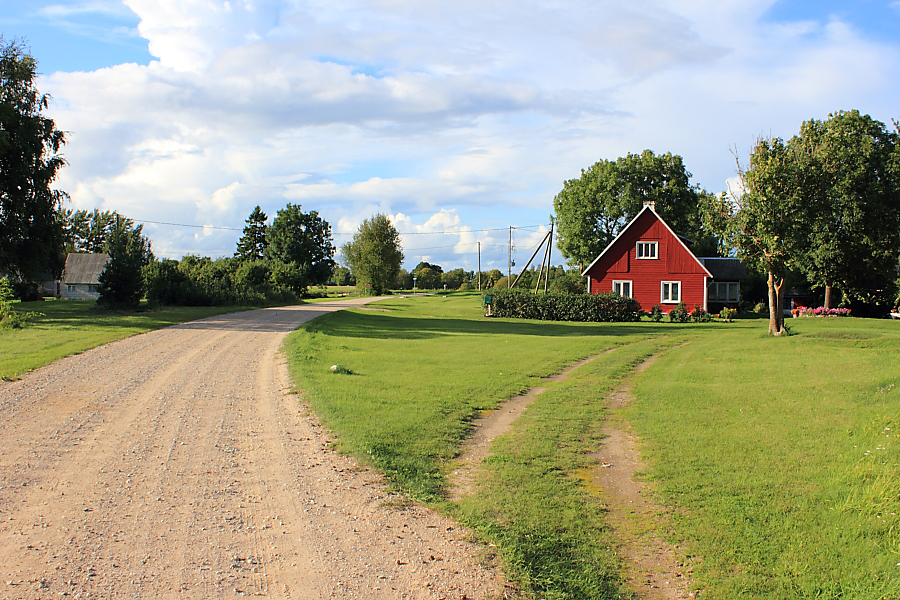
Country road on the island of Kihnu

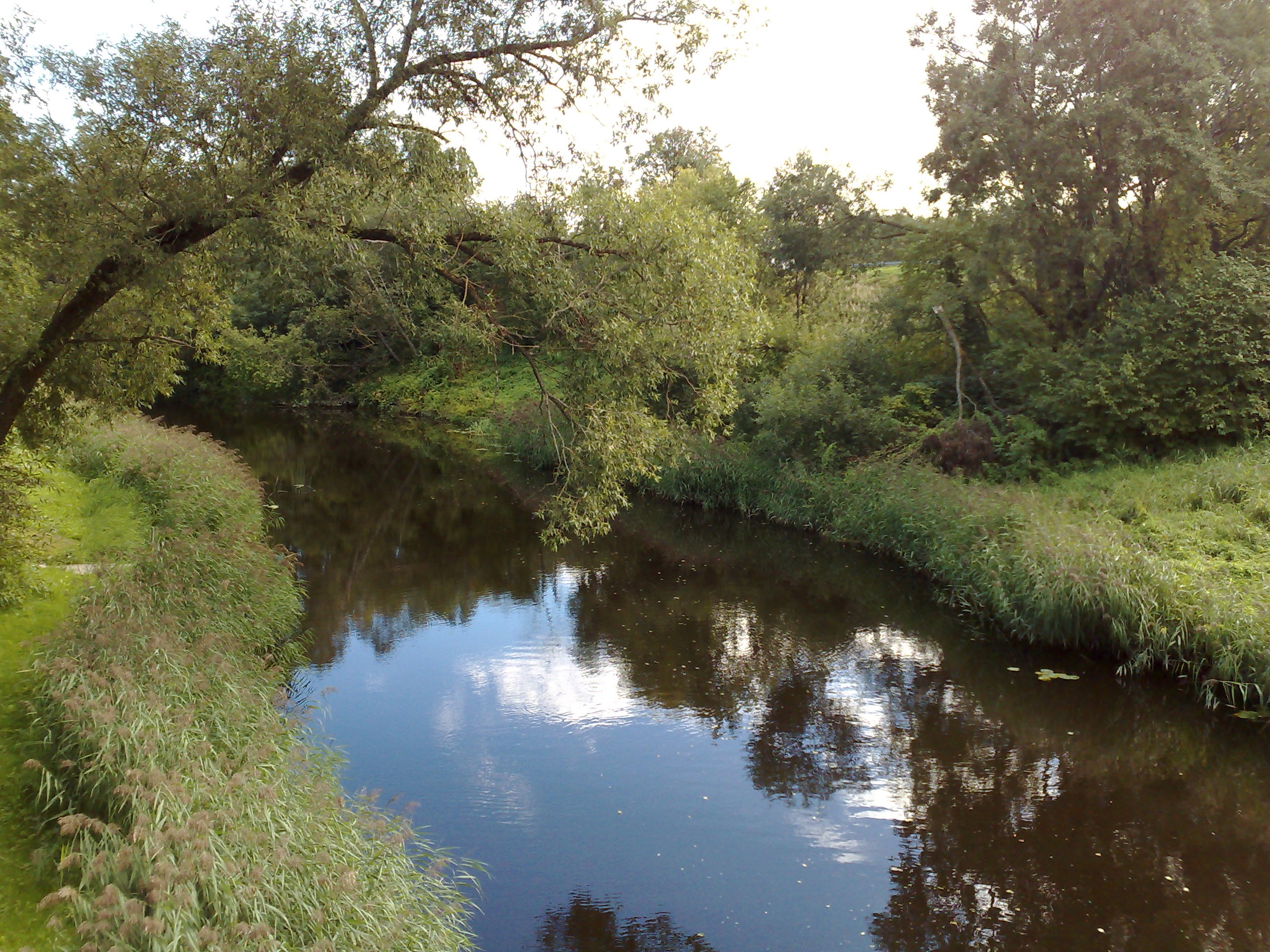
Sauga river
