= Arnold Soom =

Estonian historian (1900–1977)

- Born: June 3, 1900; Nõmme, Estonia
- Died: July 28, 1977 (aged 77); Steinach am Brenner, Austria
- Resting place: Forest Cemetery, Stockholm, Sweden
- Occupation: Historian

Arnold Soom (June 3, 1900 – July 28, 1977) was an Estonian historian.

== Early life and education ==
Arnold Soom was born at the Vaino farm in Nõmme, the son of Karel Soom (1869–1950) and Miina Emilie Soom (née Palm, 1873–1951). He graduated from the University of Tartu in 1930. In 1940, Soom became the fifth Estonian to receive a doctorate in history, with a doctorate in Estonian and Nordic history.

== Career ==
In 1922, he started working at the Central Archives of the Estonian State, where he organized the older archives of Saaremaa: the archives of the knighthood, the economic administration, the audit committees, the consistory, the office of the supreme church leader, and so on.

In 1930 he began working as the acting director of the Narva City Archives and Narva Museum, replacing the previous city archivist Eduard Dieckhoff (1863–1933), and in 1931 Soom was confirmed as the director of both institutions. From 1931 to 1940 he worked as the director of the merged Narva City Museum and Narva City Archives. Soom mainly studied the economic history of the city of Narva, especially during the Swedish period. Together with others interested in Narva's history, Soom founded the Narva Historical Society in 1931, the most important achievement of which was the publication of the first volume of Narva ajaloo (Narva History) written by Arnold Süvalep in 1936 and edited by Soom. In 1939, Carl Sarap's photo album Vana Narva (Old Narva) was also published, the historical overview of which was written by Soom. At the recommendation of the Narva Historical Society, the bastions and other defensive structures of Narva were repaired, and the Swedish-era Victoria, Honor, Gloria, and Fama bastions were cleaned and repaired and opened to tourists. In 1937, the old town of Narva was taken under heritage protection.

On September 1, 1940, after the occupation and annexation of Estonia, Soom was appointed deputy director of the Estonian SSR State Central Archives, as an assistant to the director of the Central Archives, Gottlieb Ney. On February 17, 1941, after Ney had moved to Germany, Soom was appointed acting director of the Estonian SSR State Central Archives. During the German occupation, Soom was the director of the Tallinn Central Archives of the Estonian Self-Administration and the State Library connected to it from September 1941 to September 1944.

In 1944, he fled to Sweden, where he worked at the National Archives of Sweden until his retirement in 1966. In addition to archival work, Soom conducted research in economic and social history. Soom's work was later continued by Enn Küng.

Arnold Soom's greatest work at the National Archives of Sweden was the reorganization and new cataloging of the Livonica II collection, which contains the 16th- and 17th-century archives of the Swedish Baltic provinces of Estonia, Ingria, Livonia, and Saaremaa. Soom wrote five volumes, over a hundred research articles and reviews, and extensive journalism.

Soom was one of the founding members of the Estonian Research Society in Sweden in 1945 and was a member of the board of the society until 1975. He was also active in the Academic Swedish–Estonian Society, the Estonian Research Institute, the Swedish Baltic Institute, and the Baltic Historical Committee (in Göttingen, Germany). In 1966 he was elected a member of the Turku Historical Society (Turun Historiallinen Yhdistys) and the Royal Society for Publication of Manuscripts on Scandinavian History.

== Publications ==
- 1930s: chapters of volumes 2 and 3 of Eesti ajaloo (History of Estonia) and chapters of the Saaremaa and Viljandi County regional volumes of Eesti (Estonia).
- 1940: Vene transiitkaubanduse probleem ja Eesti linnad 1636–1656 (The Problem of Russian Transit Trade and Estonian Cities 1636–1656). Dissertation. University of Tartu, Faculty of Philosophy.
- 1954: Der Herrenhof in Estland im 17. Jahrhundert (The Manor in Estonia in the Seventeenth Century). Lund: Skånska Centraltryck.
- 1954–1962: contributions to the collection Eesti riik ja rahvas II Maailmasõjas (The Estonian State and People in the Second World War). Stockholm: EMP.
- 1961: Der baltische Getreidehandel im 17. Jahrhundert (The Baltic Trade in the Seventeenth Century). (= Kungliga Vitterhets historie och antikvitets akademiens handlingar. Historiska serien, 8). Stockholm: Almquist & Wiksell.
- 1967: "Varutransporterna mellan Sverige och de svenskägda baltiska gårdarna under 1600-talet" (Supply Transports between Sweden and Swedish-Owned Baltic Farms during the 1600s). Svio-Estonica 18: 51–86.
- 1969: Der Handel Revals im 17. Jahrhundert (Tallinn Trade in the Seventeenth Century). (= Marburger Ostforschungen 29). Wiesbaden: Otto Harrassowitz.
- 1971: Die Zunfthandwerker in Reval im siebzehnten Jahrhundert (Tallinn Guild Craftsmen in the Seventeenth Century). (= Handlingar Historiska serien 15). Stockholm: Almqvist & Wiksell.
- 1996: Mälestusi: artikleid (Memoirs: Articles). Tartu: Eesti ajalooarhiiv.

== Awards and recognitions ==
- 1936: Royal Order of Vasa
