= Kuiaru Nature Reserve =

Protected area in Estonia

- Location within Estonia
- Location: Estonia
- Coordinates: 58°29′N 24°43′E
- Area: 222 ha (550 acres)
- Established: 2007

Kuiaru Nature Reserve is a nature reserve which is located in Pärnu County, Estonia.

The area of the nature reserve is 222 ha.

The protected area was founded in 2007 to protect valuable habitat types and threatened species in Võlla village (former Are Parish) and in Kuiaru village (former Tori Parish).
