= Mihkel Mathiesen =

Estonian politician

7th President of the, pre-WW II, Republic of Estonia, in exile
- In office 15 September 1992 – 28 November 2003
- Preceded by: Heinrich Mark
- Succeeded by: Kalev Ots

Personal details
- Born: 27 October 1918 Pärivere, Estonia
- Died: 28 November 2003 (aged 85) Stockholm, Sweden
- Spouse: Maia Sinberg
- Profession: Engineer

Mihkel Mathiesen (27 October 1918 – 28 November 2003) was an Estonian statesman.

Mihkel Mathiesen was born in Pärivere, Are Parish (now, Tori Parish), Pärnu County. He was Estonian Minister of Communications in exile from 5 June 1985 to 20 June 1990 and Minister of Economic Affairs in exile from 20 June 1990 to 15 September 1992.

On 16 July 1992 he voted against abolition of the government in exile and on 15 September of the same year he assumed presidency (Prime Minister in the capacity of the President of the Republic) and appointed a new government.

Mihkel Mathiesen was succeeded on his death by Kalev Ots.
