= Võlla =

Võlla may refer to several places in Estonia:

- Võlla, Pärnu County, village in Are Parish, Pärnu County
- Võlla, Saare County, village in Muhu Parish, Saare County

== See also ==
- Volla (disambiguation)
