= Carl Sarap =

Estonian editor and photographer (1893–1942)

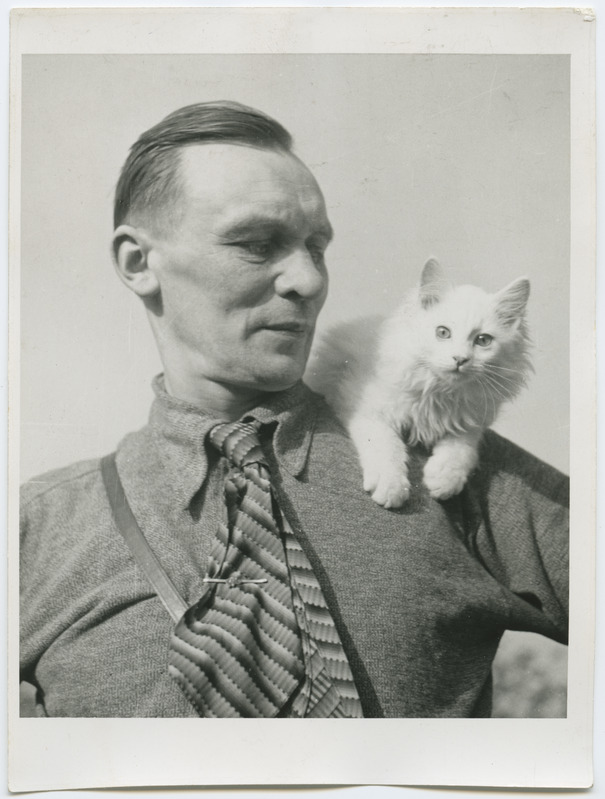
- Carl Sarap and his cat Pusa, 1936
- Born: March 4, 1893; Voka, Estonia
- Died: November 5, 1942 (aged 49); Usollag, Solikamsk, USSR
- Occupations: Editor and photographer

Carl Sarap (March 4, 1893 – November 5, 1942) was an Estonian editor and photographer.

Sarap was the founder of the publishing house Odamees, where he worked as an editor and photographer. In the 1930s, he published photo postcards under the pseudonym Johann Triefeldt (J. Triefeldt, Joh. Triefeldt). His photo series Kaunis kodumaa (Beautiful Homeland) and Eesti pildis: Geograafilised pildisarjad koolidele (Estonia in Pictures: Geographical Picture Series for Schools) are well known.

== Early life and education ==
Carl Sarap was born in Voka, Estonia, the son of Juhan Sarap (1862–?) and Amalie Charlotte Sarap (née Saar, 1868–1952). His father was a schoolmaster in Voka and later a manor manager in Sompa, and he operated a bookstore in Rakvere in the 1920s. Juhan Sarap had a farm in the village of Martsa. Carl Sarap enrolled at the University of Tartu, but his studies were interrupted by the First World War.

== Career ==
Toward the end of the First World War, Sarap managed to earn a large sum of money, with which he founded the company Odamees–Carl Sarap in Tartu. In addition to publishing and a bookstore, he also owned a toy factory. Sarap's publishing house bought up and published the works of the former members of the Siuru group, other fiction and non-fiction, translated works, and calendars.

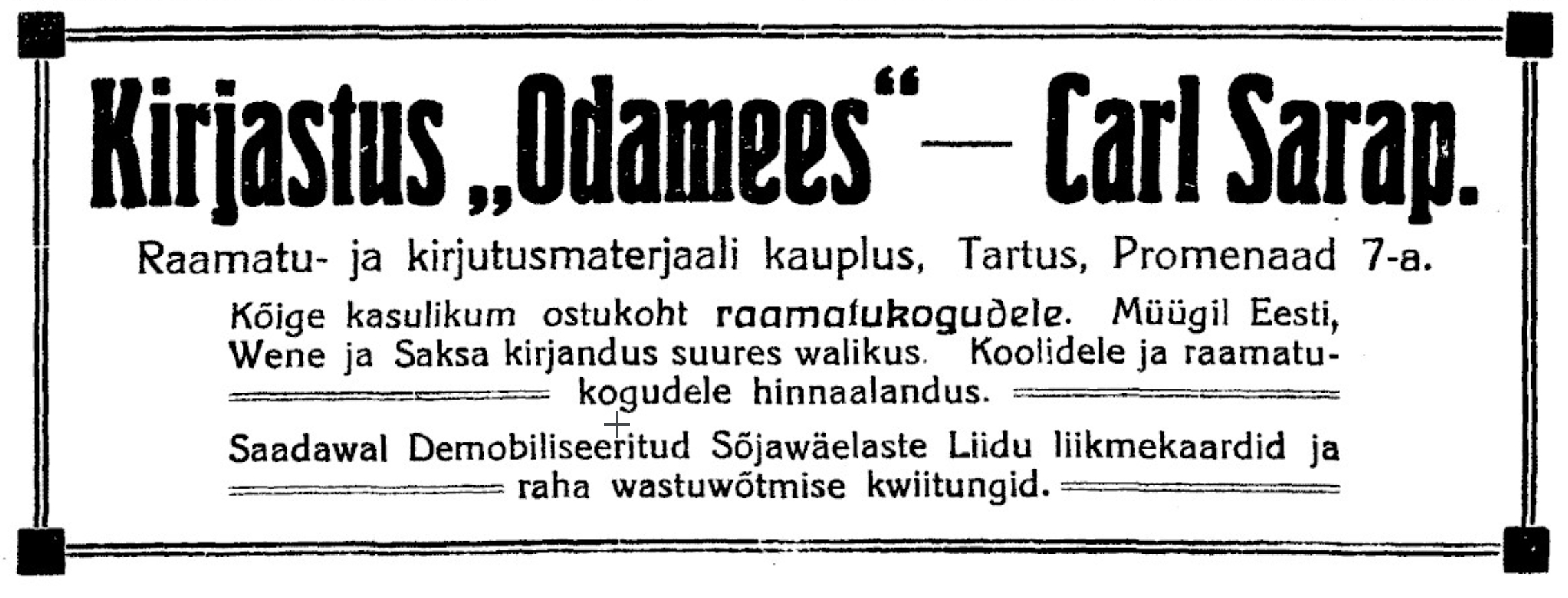
Advertisement for Carl Sarap's publishing house in the newspaper Vaba Eesti, 1922

In 1919 and from 1922 to 1927, Sarap's publishing house published the literary, art, and research magazine Odamees. In 1919, the magazine's managing editor was Friedebert Tuglas, and five issues were published. In 1919, the weekly newspaper Odamees was also published for a short time. The managing editor was August Alle, and ten issues were published. After the magazine's ownership changed, Sarap worked as the editor-in-chief of Odamees from 1928 to 1929. After Sarap's publishing and book business ran into difficulties, the debts were paid off by guarantors—relatives, acquaintances, and friends. Sarap was declared insolvent in 1929.

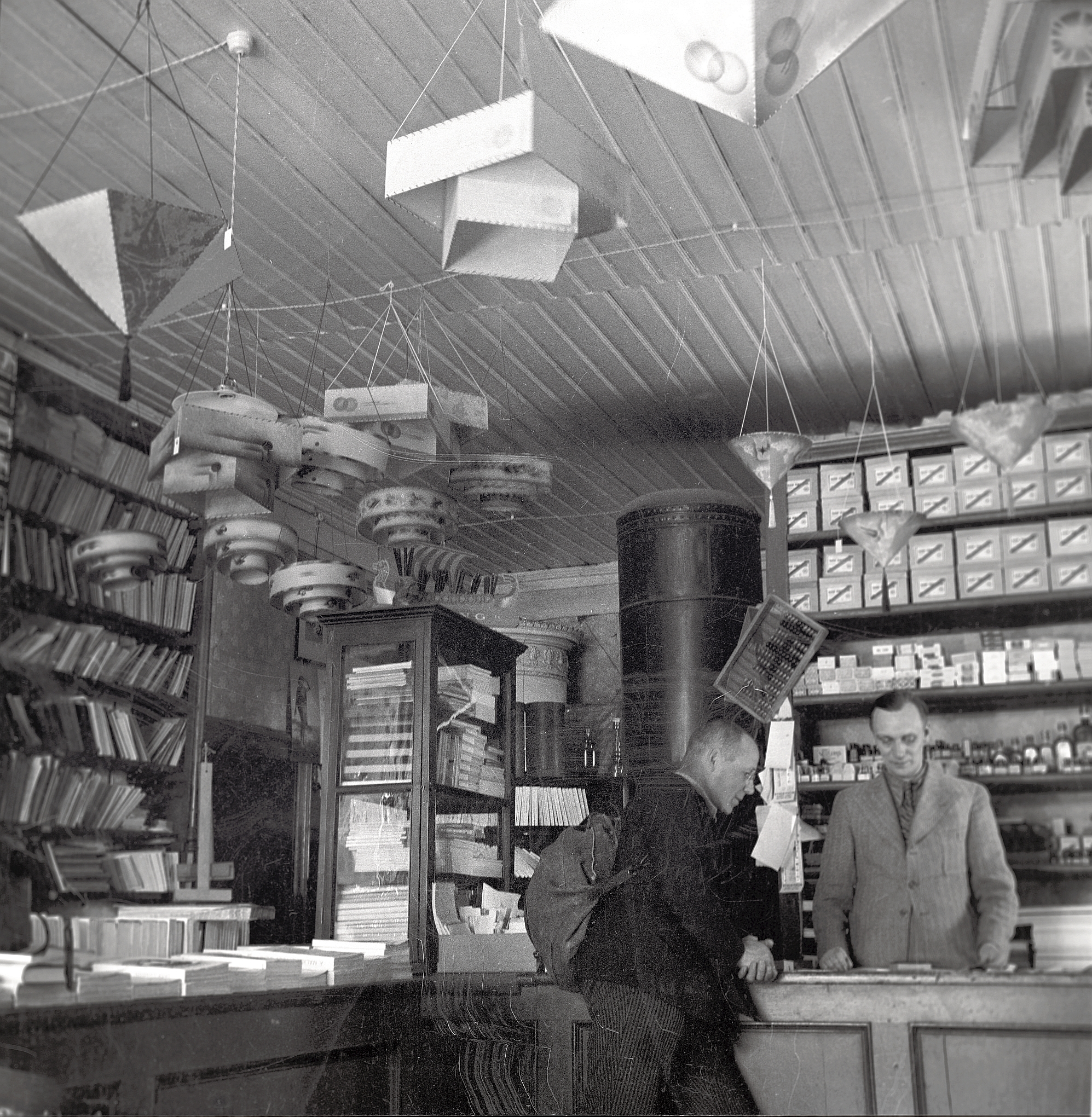
The Triefeldt bookstore in Rakvere, circa 1930–1936. Carl Sarap stands behind the counter in the photo department

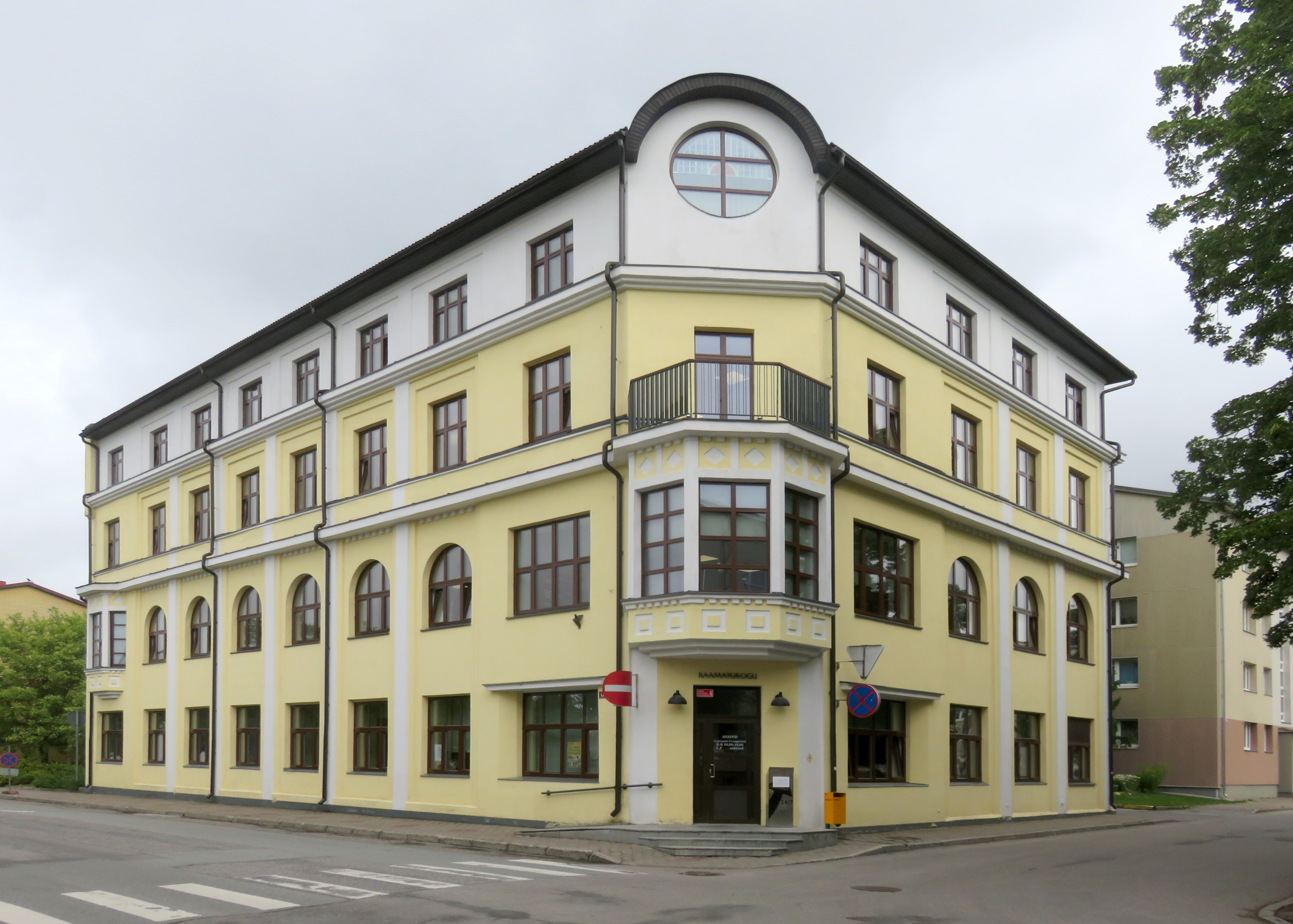
The building at Lai tänav 7 in Rakvere in 2025, where the J. Triefeldt bookstore operated in the 1930s

Sarap moved back to Rakvere, where, together with his new partner Johanna Triefeldt (1899–1968), a former Toila school teacher, he operated a bookstore under the business name J. Triefeldt from 1929 onward, where Sarap was responsible for photography.

Starting in 1934, Sarap began systematically photographing Estonian landscapes, nature, animals, villages, and cities. He traveled with his camera throughout Estonia, making long journeys on foot and by car. Under the pseudonym J. Triefeldt (Joh. Triefeldt), Sarap published many photo postcards and also the postcard series Kaunis kodumaa (Beautiful Homeland, 1936–1940). In 1934, Sarap's photograph of Narva's Rahu Street was published in the Estonian Encyclopedia as one of the illustrations for the entry "photographic art".

In 1936, a photo-illustrated volume on the architectural history of Narva also included photographs by Sarap. He received a gold medal at the 1937 World Exhibition in Paris. In 1937, Triefeldt's business moved to Broad Street (Estonian: Lai tänav) 17 (today Lai tänav 7) in Rakvere. In 1939, the publishing house Kultuurkoondis in Tallinn published the photo book Vana Narva (Old Narva) compiled by Sarap, which contained photos of the old town of Narva taken by Sarap and a historical overview by the Narva city archivist Arnold Soom.

== Arrest and death ==
On June 14, 1941, Sarap was arrested by the NKVD in the village of Voka in Virumaa County because of the camera he had with him in the border zone. Along with other detainees from the Tallinn Pre-Trial Prison, he was "evacuated" on July 4, 1941, before the arrival of German troops in Russia, to the Molotov Oblast, where he died in the Usollag prison camp in Solikamsk on November 5, 1942.

== Personal life ==
Sarap married Maari Velt (1897–?) in 1920, and the couple had two children.

== Photos by Sarap ==
=== Individual photos ===
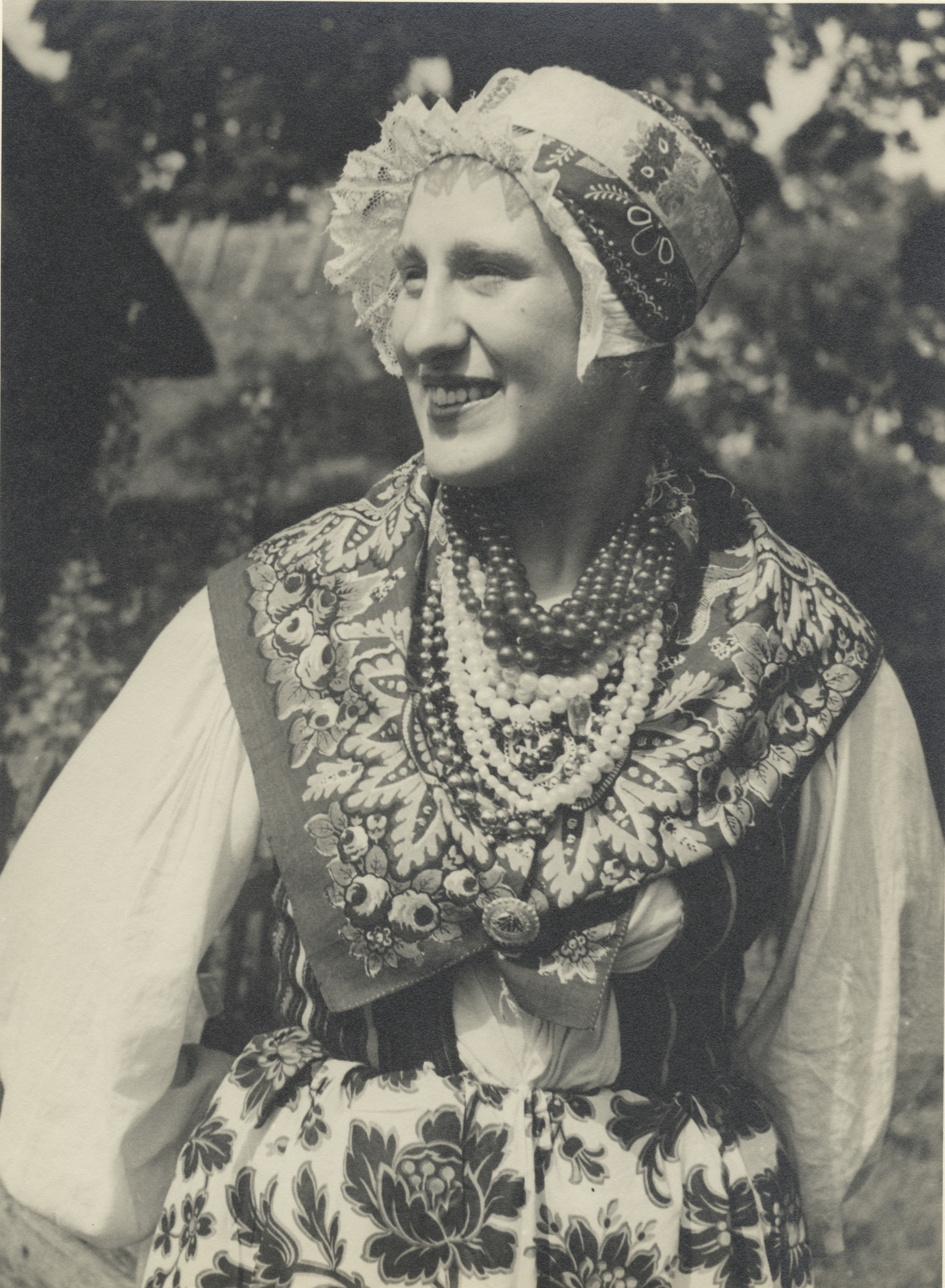
Maria Klaassen on the island of Ruhnu

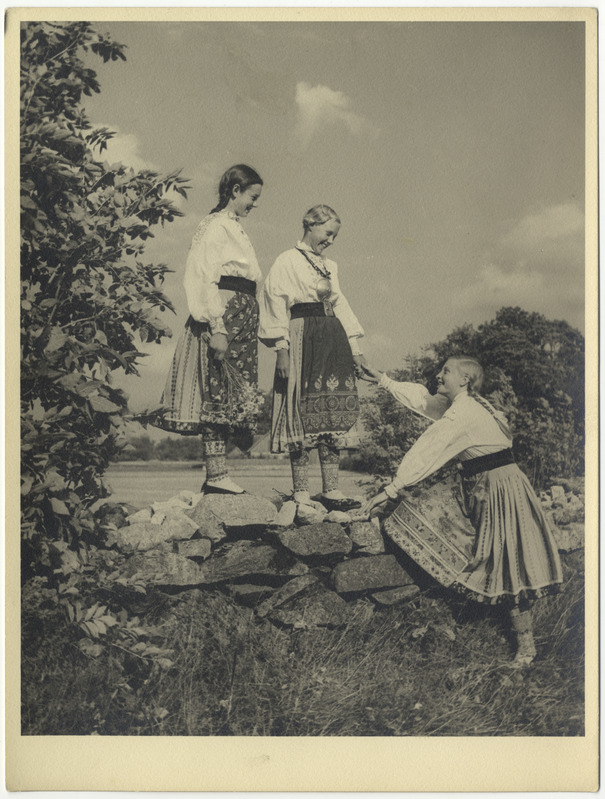
Alma Kodu, Linda Aljas, and Armilde Äkke in Võlla, Muhu

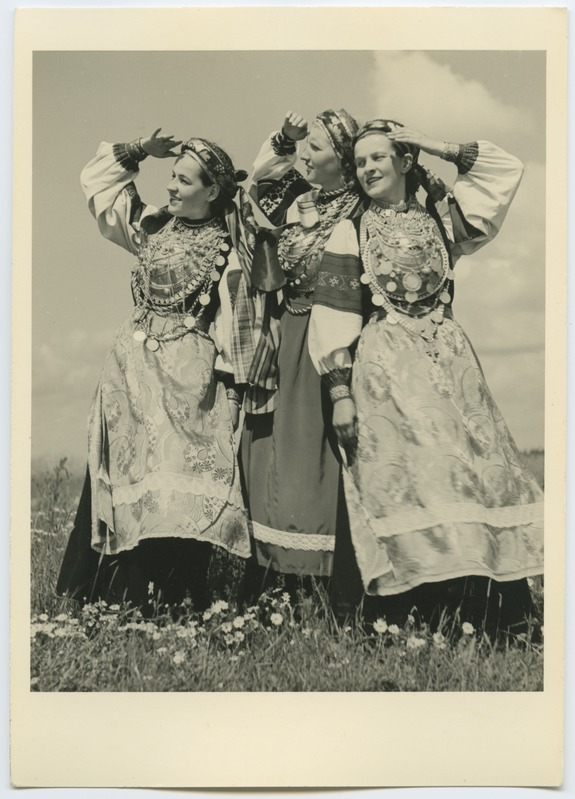
Olli Kalju, Agne Raag, and Anni Kalju in Obinitsa

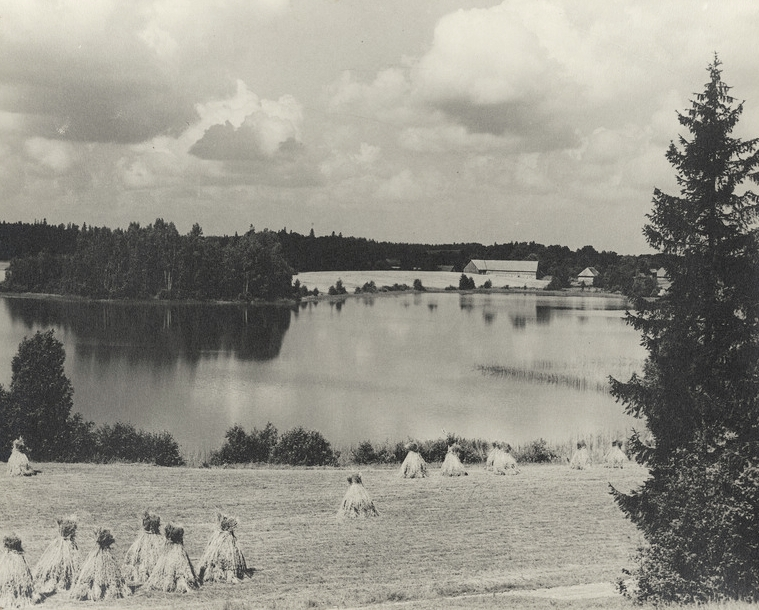
Holy Lake (Pühajärv) near Otepää

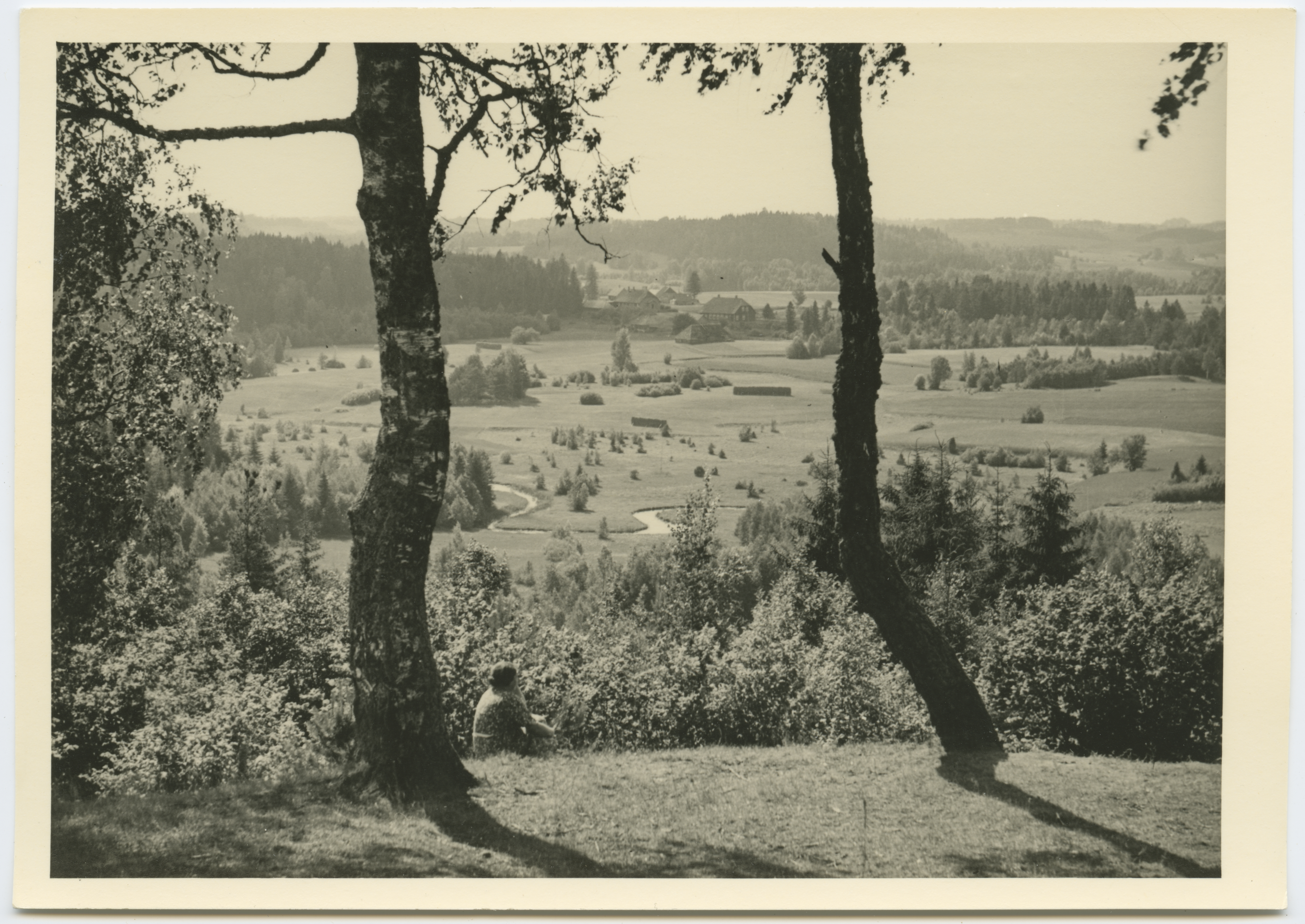
View from Horse Hill (Hobustemägi) near Otepää

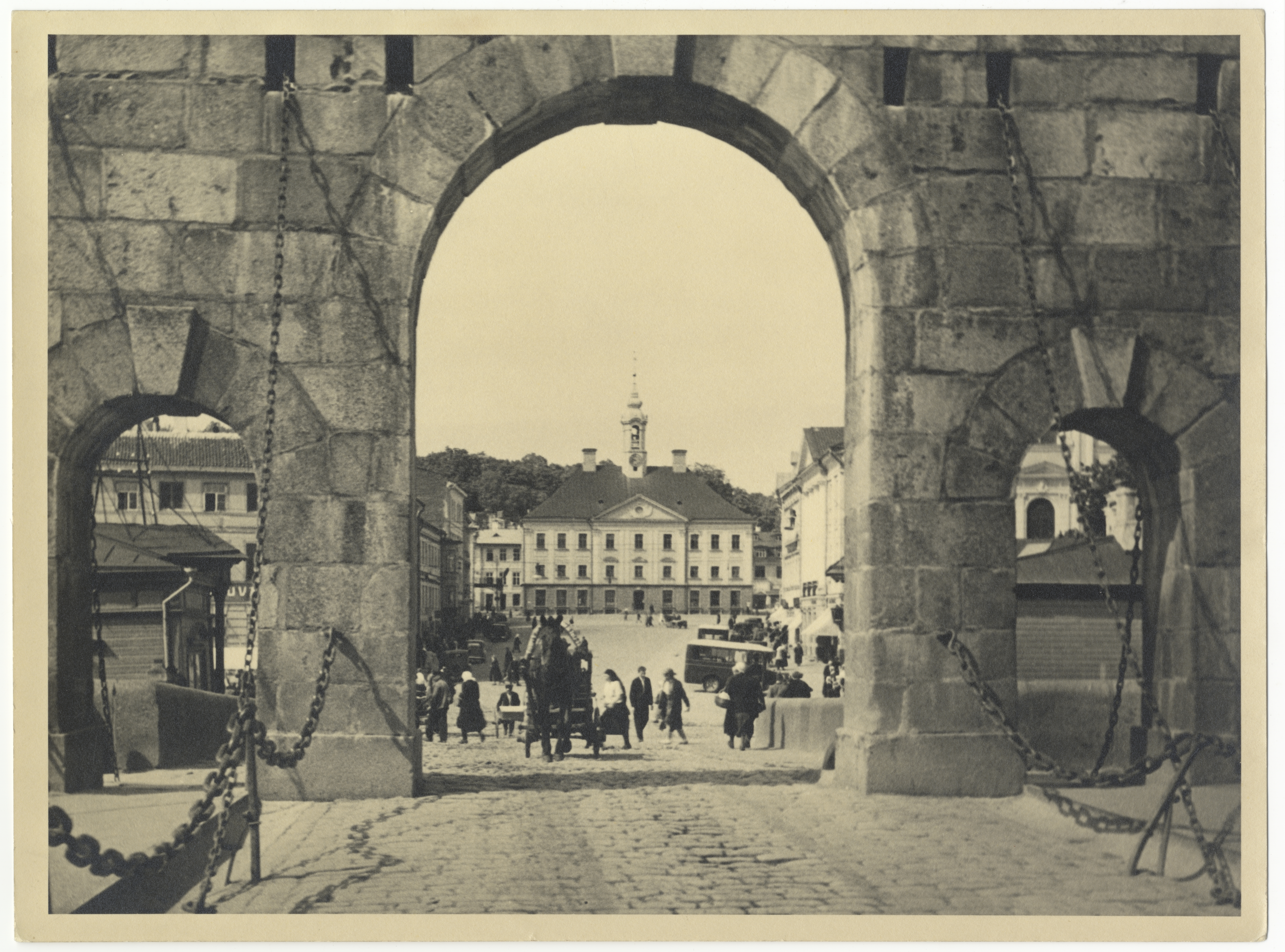
Tartu: Stone Bridge (Kivisild) and Town Hall Square (Raekoja plats)

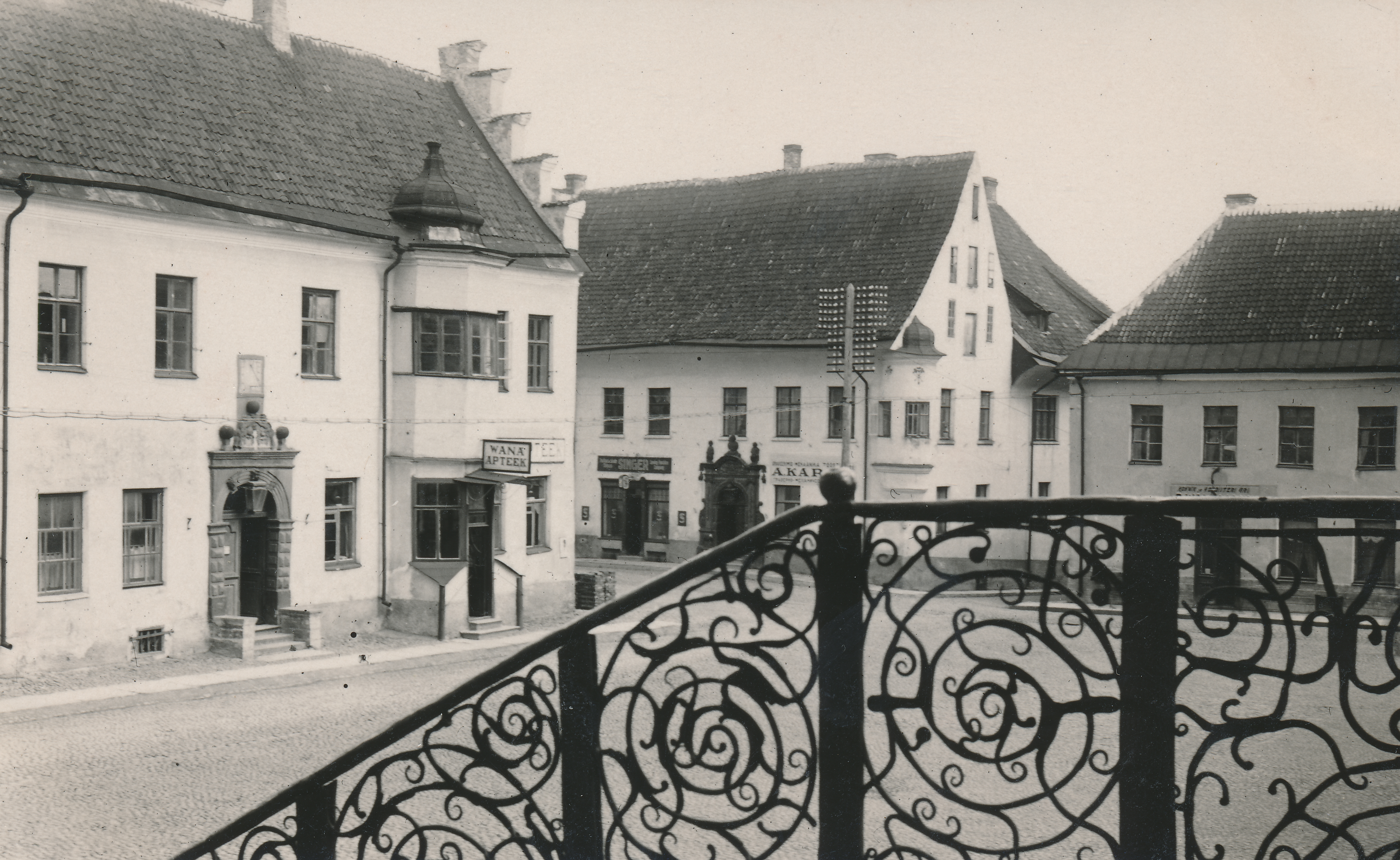
Narva: wrought-iron railings of the Town Hall stairs and Town Hall Square (Raekoja plats)

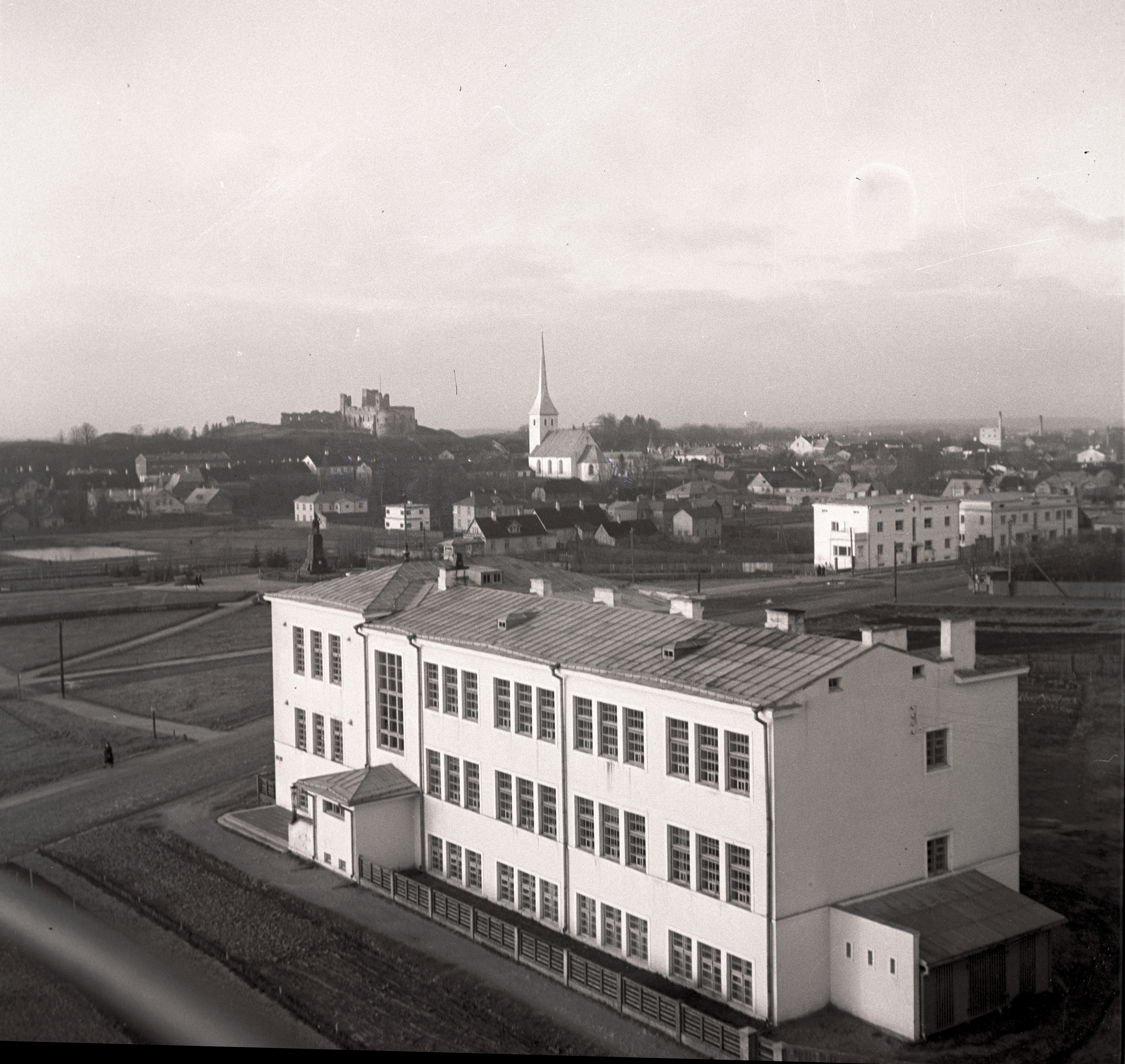
View of Rakvere

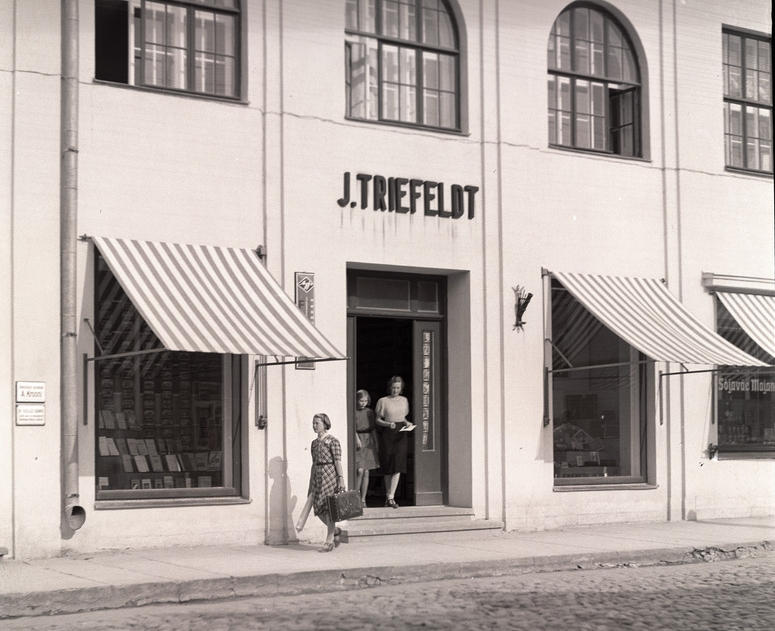
The J. Triefeldt bookstore in Rakvere

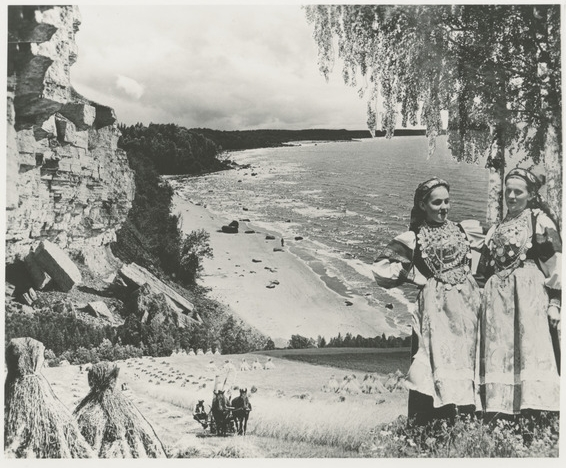
Estonian nature. Photomontage, 1940

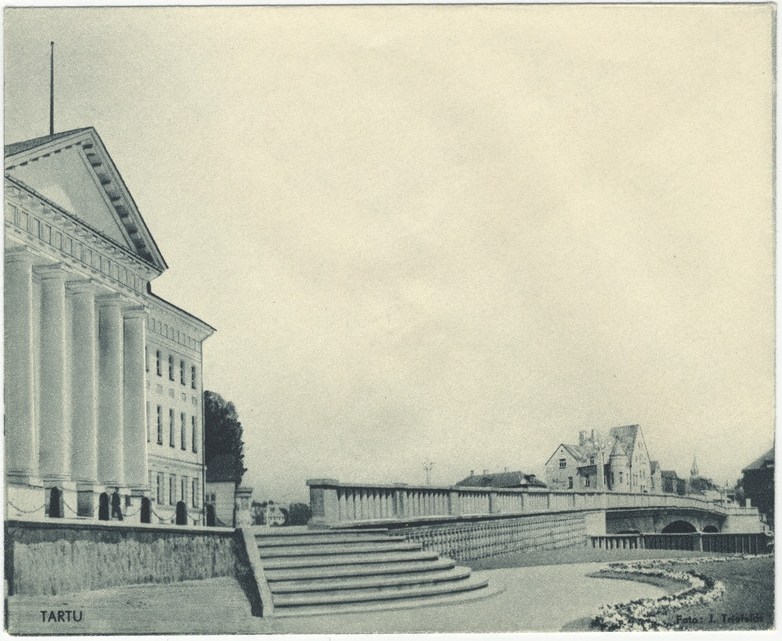
Envelope with views of Tartu

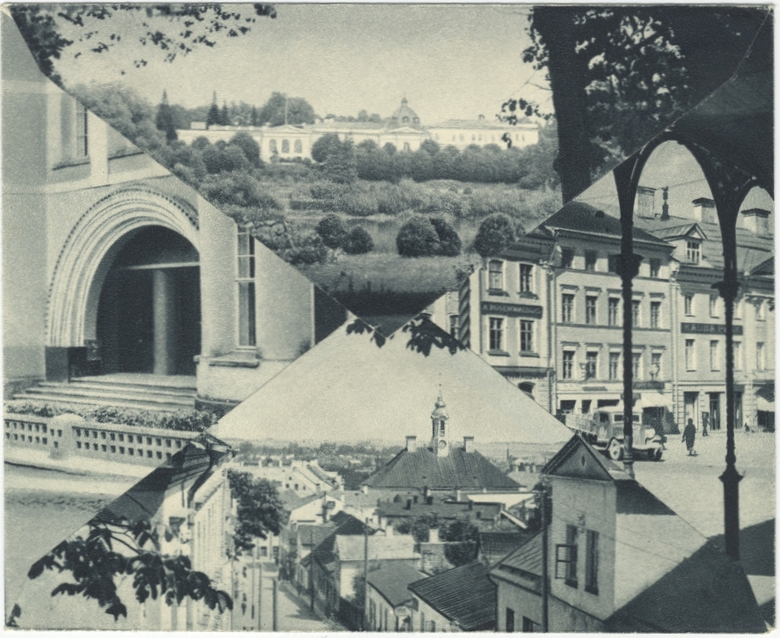
Envelope with views of Tartu

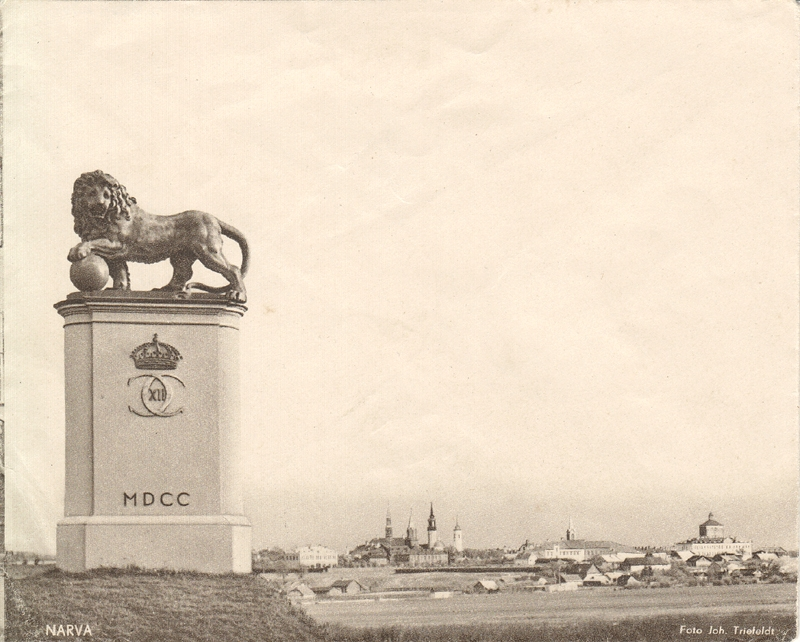
Envelope with views of Narva and The Swedish Lion in Narva

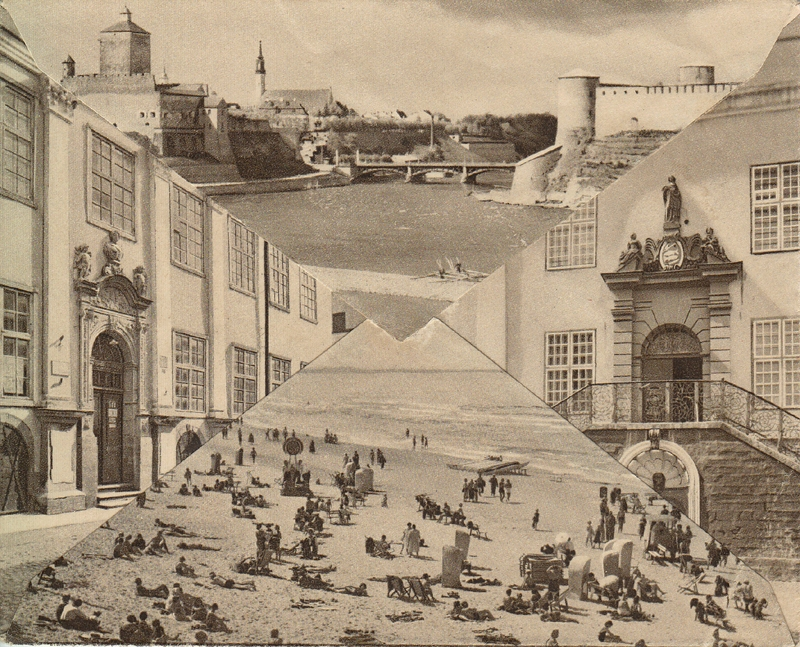
Envelope with views of Narva

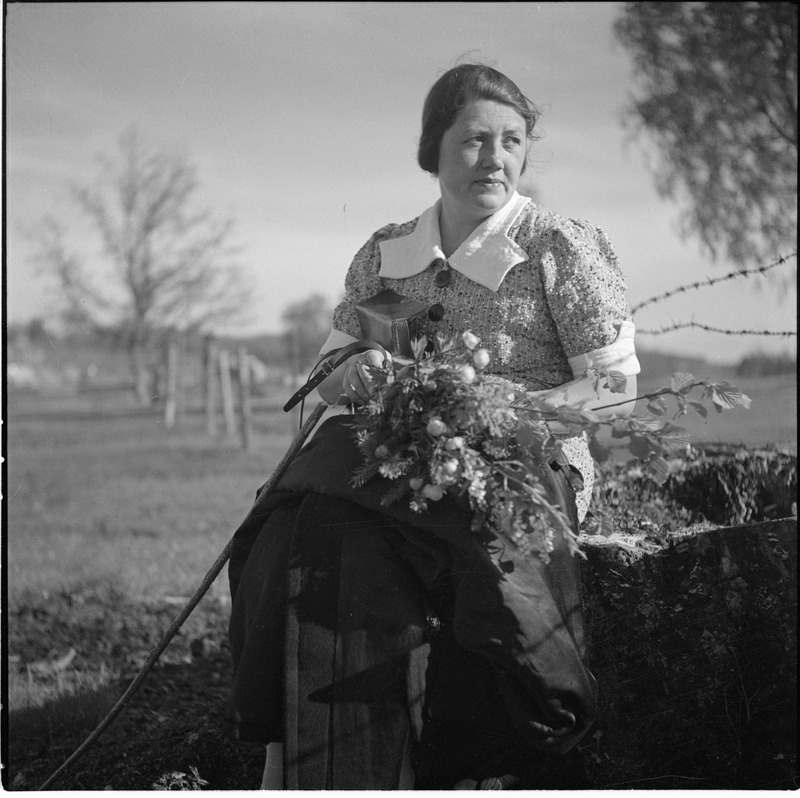
Portrait of Johanna Triefeldt

=== The postcard series "Beautiful Homeland" (1936–1940) ===
"Sügis" (Autumn) in the series "Beautiful Homeland," 1939

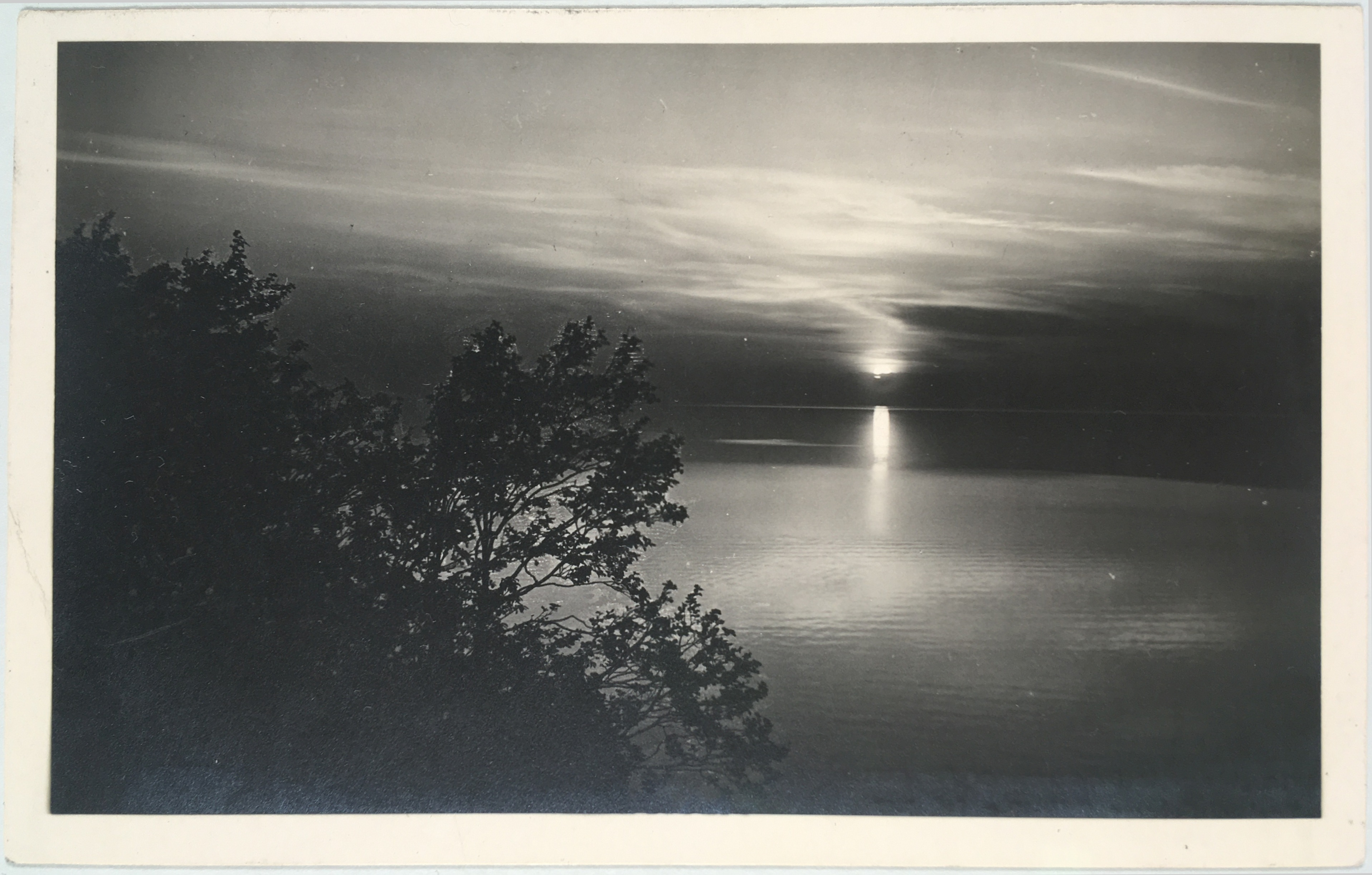
"Loojang" (Sunset) in the series "Beautiful Homeland," 1939

The photo postcards of the series "Beautiful Homeland" (Estonian: Kaunis kodumaa) were made from Carl Sarap's photographs taken between 1936 and 1940. The publisher was Triefeldt's company in Rakvere. Sarap began photographing the series no later than 1934. The back of the postcards was printed with the title of the photo (usually a place name), the name of the publisher, the year of publication, and the serial number of the series, from 001 to 2050. It is known that nearly 600 different photo postcards were published as part of the series.

=== The postcard series "Estonia in Pictures: Geographical Picture Series for Schools" (1939) ===
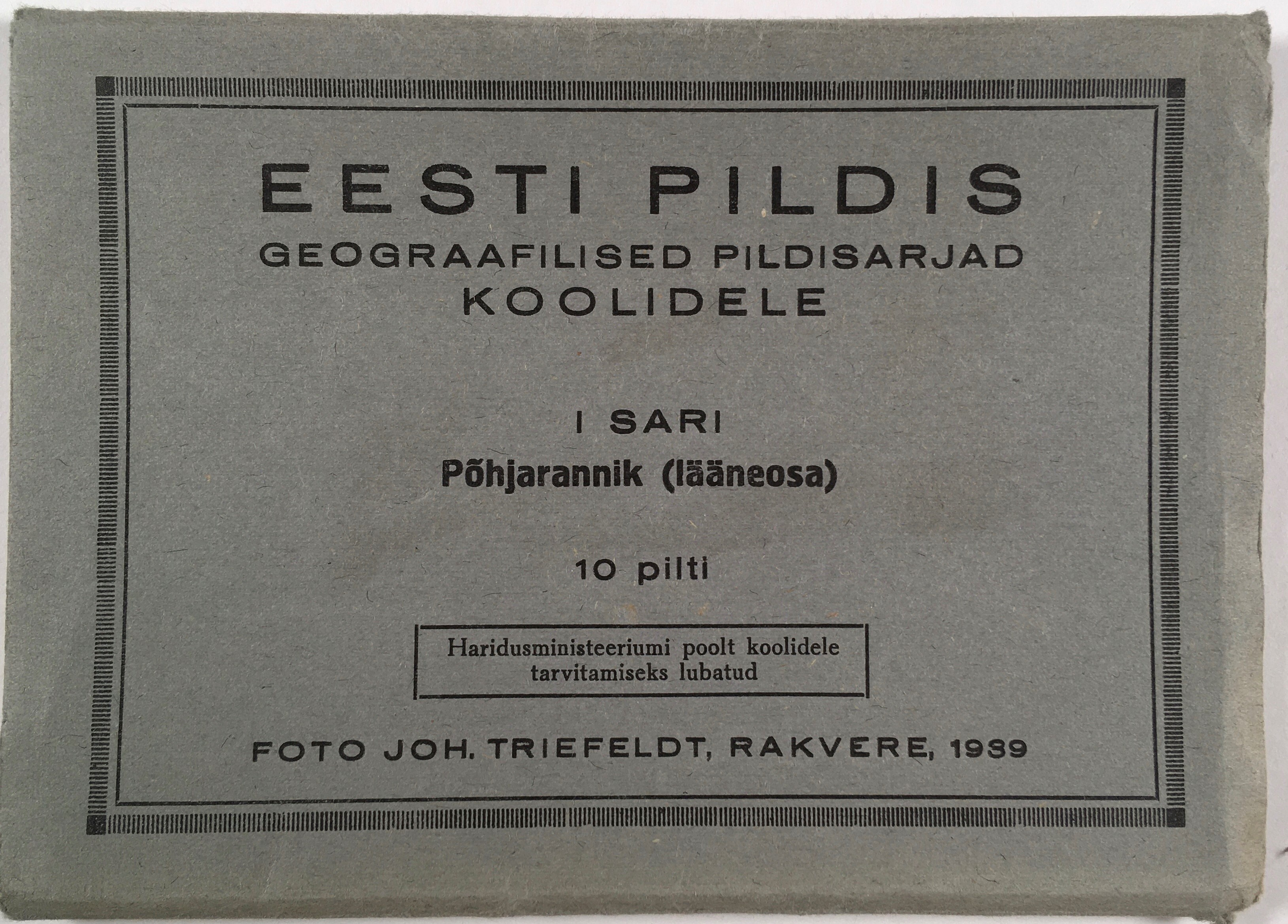
Cover paper for "Estonia in Pictures: Geographical Picture Series for Schools," 1939

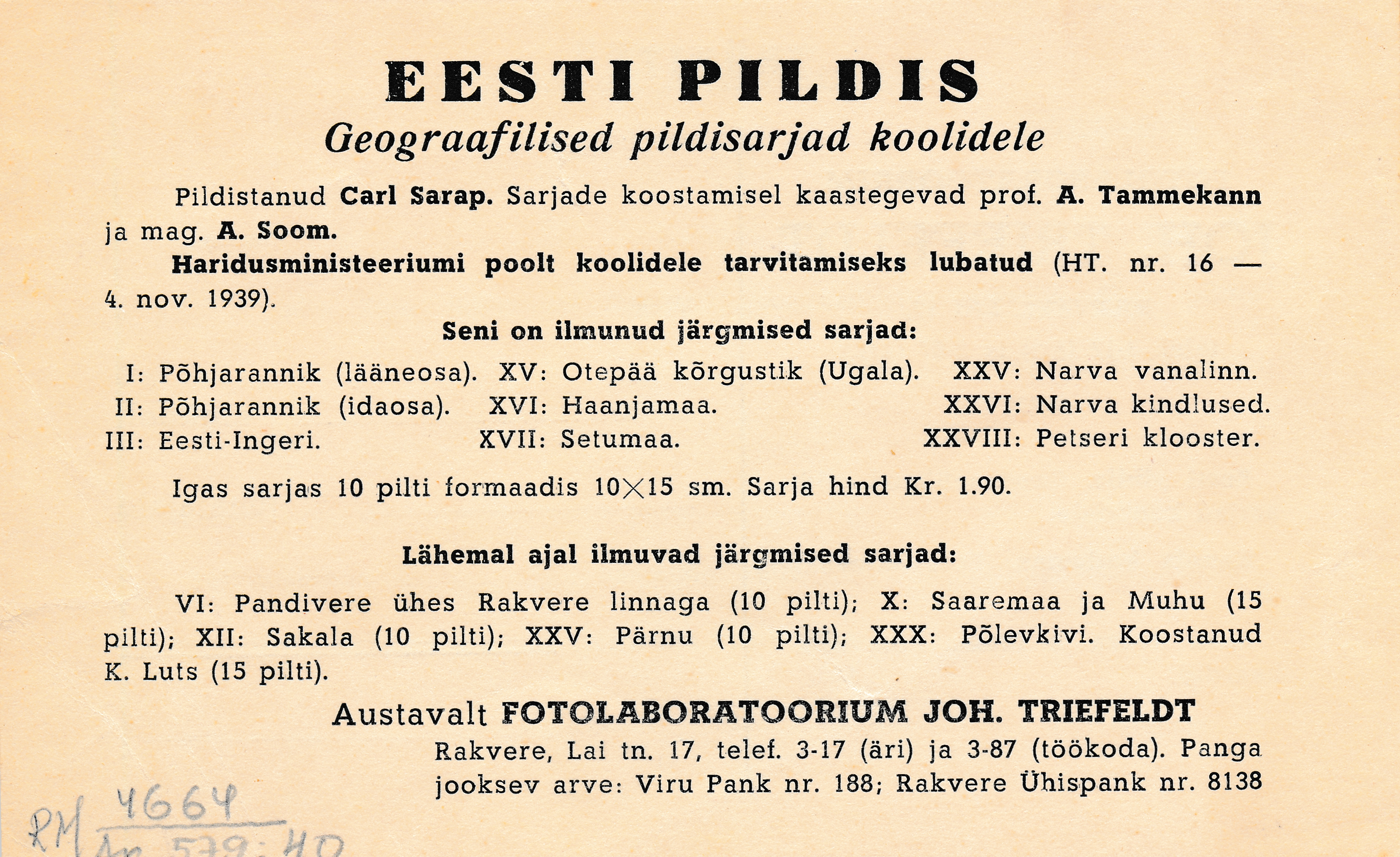
Advertisement for "Estonia in Pictures: Geographical Picture Series for Schools," 1939

In 1939, Triefeldt's company began publishing a series of photo sets with Carl Sarap's photographs, intended as a teaching aid for schools, called "Estonia in Pictures: Geographical Picture Series for Schools" (Estonian: Eesti pildis: Geograafilised pildisarjad koolidele). The set of pictures dedicated to a specific Estonian region included a paper cover and ten different photos with information about the subject of the picture printed on the back. The geographer August Tammekann and the historian Arnold Soom contributed to the series of pictures. Nine photo sets were eventually published (all in 1939).
