= Academic Historical Society =

Estonian academic organization

The Academic Historical Society (Estonian: Akadeemiline Ajalooselts) is an Estonian scientific society re-established in Tartu on 7 January 1999. The predecessor of the society is the Academic Historical Society (also referred to as the Academic Historical Society in sources; abbreviated as AAS), founded in 1920 by history professors at the University of Tartu.

The goals of the society are to promote the study of history, maintain the academic values of historical science, strengthen scientific connections among historians, and develop scientific discussion, as well as promote international cooperation among historians and contribute to the teaching and popularization of history.

From 1922 to 1940, the Academic Historical Society published the Historical Journal. The Society is currently its co-publisher.

The chairman of the Academic Historical Society is Janet Laidla since 18 February 2010. The board also includes Enn Küng, Mati Laur, Ago Pajur, and Anti Selart. Since 2014, the chairman of the Academic Historical Society is Kaarel Vanamölder.
