= Odamees (publisher) =

Estonian publishing house (1918–1927)

Odamees (or Odamees/Carl Sarap) was an Estonian publishing house and bookstore founded by Carl Sarap that operated in Tartu from 1918 to 1927.

The company published three publications, all of which were named Odamees. These publications were:

- Odamees: kirjanduse, kunsti ja teaduse ajakiri (The Spearman: A Magazine of Literature, Art, and Science): a 32-page magazine edited by Friedebert Tuglas published in Tartu from April to June 1919. Five issues were published.
- Odamees: kirjanduslise humoori ja päevasündmuste nädalleht (The Spearman: A Weekly Magazine of Literary Humor and Current Events): a weekly magazine edited by August Alle in Tartu from August 21 to October 25, 1919. Ten issues were published.
- Odamees (The Spearman): an illustrated magazine dealing with cultural life published irregularly in Tartu from 1922 to 1929. A total of 25 issues were published.
