= Niidu =

Village in Estonia

Coordinates: 58°32′N 24°35′E

- Village
- Interactive map of Niidu
- Country: Estonia
- County: Pärnu County
- Parish: Turi Parish
- Time zone: UTC+2 (EET)
  - Summer (DST): UTC+3 (EEST)

Niidu is a village in Tori Parish, Pärnu County in southwestern Estonia. Prior to the administrative reform of Estonian local governments in 2017, the village was part of Are Parish.
