= Voka (village) =

Village in Estonia

- Village
- Location within Estonia
- Coordinates: 59°23′39″N 27°33′38″E
- Country: Estonia
- County: Ida-Viru County
- Parish: Toila Parish

Population (2011)
  - Total: 106
- Time zone: UTC+2 (EET)
  - Summer (DST): UTC+3 (EEST)

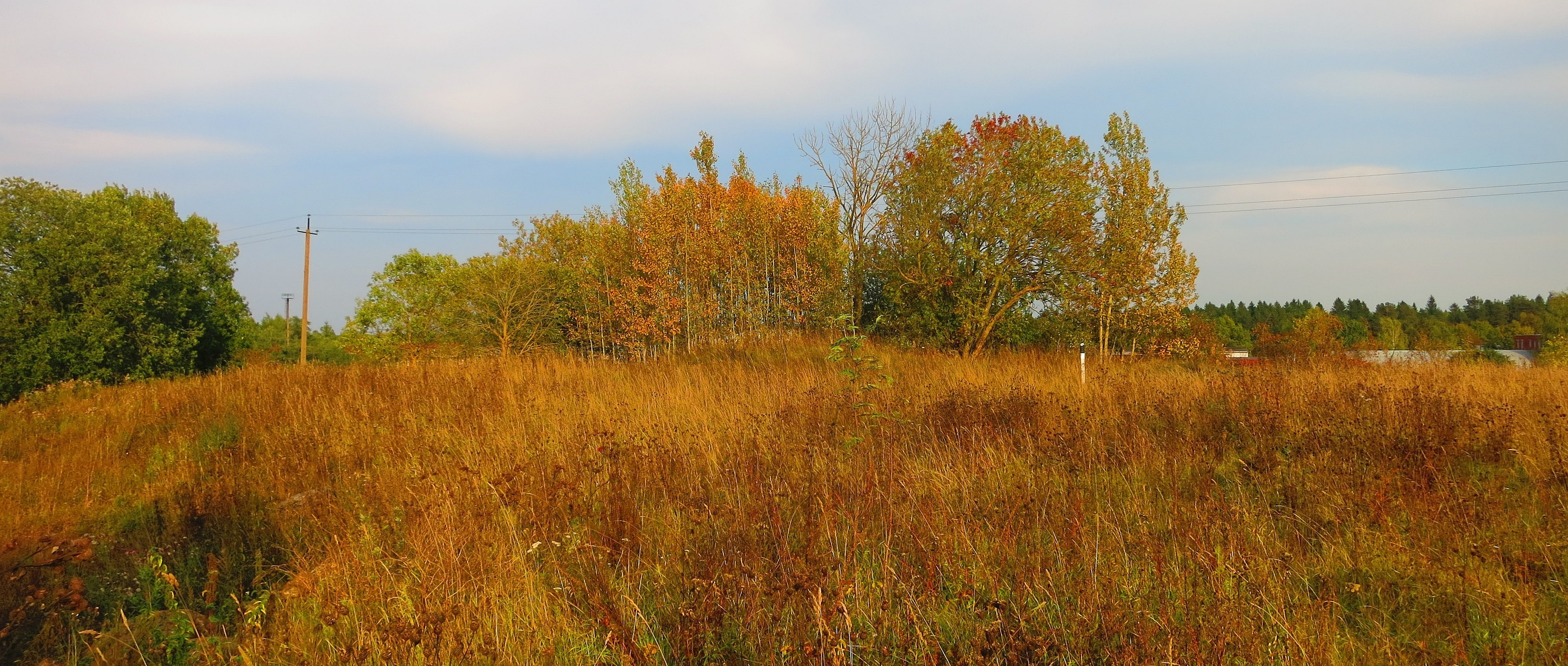
Stone grave in Voka (cultural heritage monument of Estonia #9164)

Voka is a village in Toila Parish, Ida-Viru County, Estonia.

== Name ==
The village of Voka was originally named *Kirivere or *Kärivere, and it was attested in historical sources as Kiriuere in 1426, Käriwieriin 1583–1589, and Kärrifer in 1726. The owner of the nearby manor, named Fokenhof, southeast of what is now the borough of Voka, was listed as Hans Fåk (i.e., Johann Fock) in 1620. The name Voka for the village dates from the 18th century, and it is an adaptation of the surname Fock.

== Notable people ==
Notable people that were born or lived in Voka include the following:

- Carl Sarap (1893–1942), editor and photographer
