= Volla =

Volla may refer to:

- Another name for the Norse goddess Fulla
- Volla, Campania, a municipality in the Metropolitan City of Naples, Italy
- Volla (comics), a fictional character who appears in Marvel Comics

== People with the surname ==
- Pierre Volla (born 1981), French equestrian

== See also ==
- Võlla (disambiguation)
