= Enn Küng =

Estonian historian (born 1963)

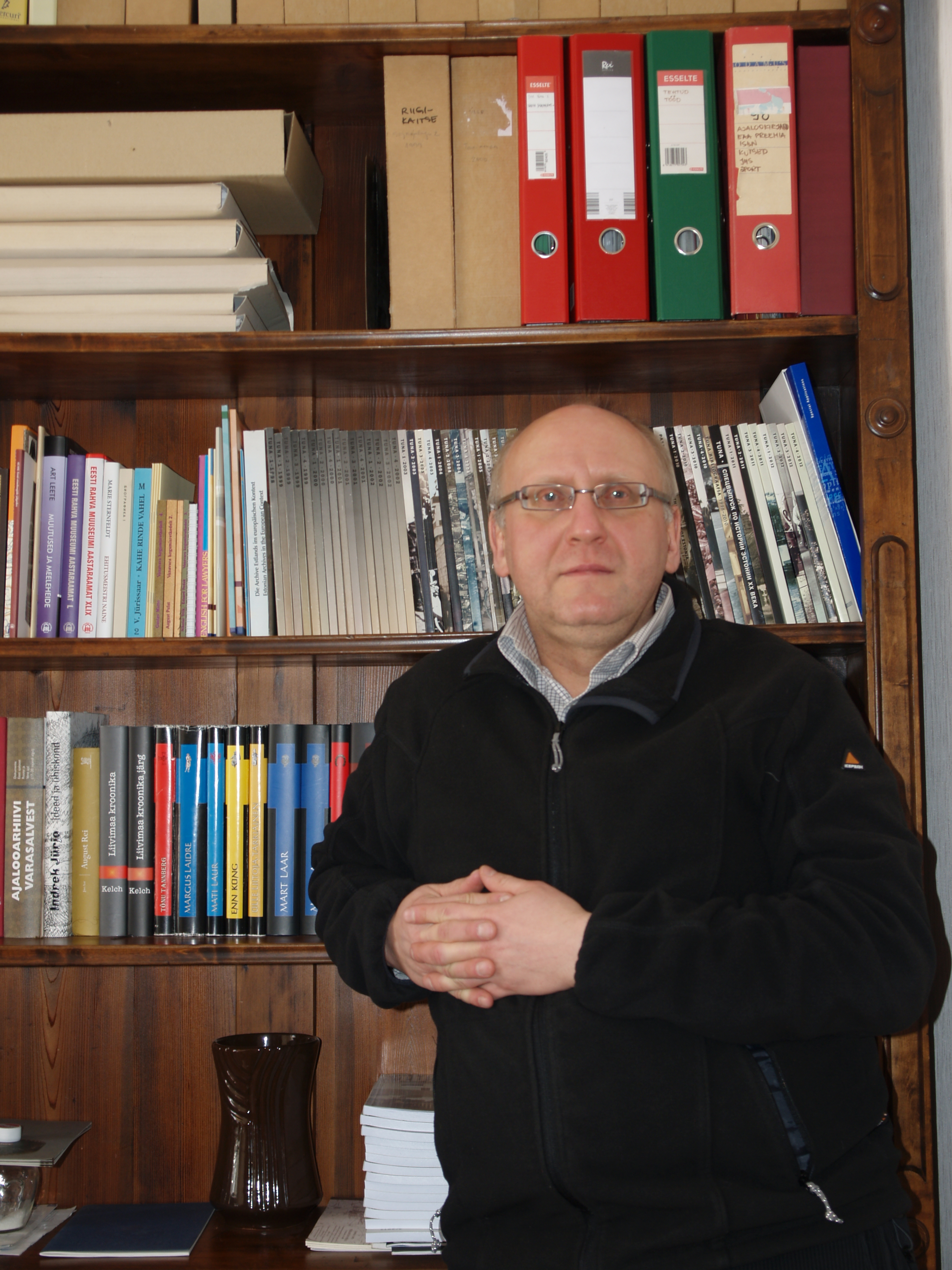
- Born: October 31, 1963 (age 62); Tallinn, then part of Estonian SSR, Soviet Union
- Occupation: Historian

Enn Küng (born October 31, 1963) is an Estonian historian and lecturer at the University of Tartu.

== Early life and education ==
Enn Küng was born in Tallinn. He studied history at Tartu State University from 1982 to 1988. He received his master's degree in 1992 and his doctorate in 2001.

== Career ==
From 1992 to 2005, Küng worked at the Estonian Historical Archives. Since 1994 he has been a lecturer at the University of Tartu, and since 2005 he has been an associate professor at the Department of Estonian History. Küng has mainly researched the early modern period of Estonia and Sweden (16th and 17th centuries). He is particularly interested in economic and trade policy. In 2002 he received an award for the best Estonian history book for his doctoral thesis.

From 2000 to 2010, Küng was the chairman of the Academic Historical Society. In 2013, a new version of the third volume of the series Eesti ajaloo (Estonian History), edited and compiled by Küng, was published.

== Awards and recognitions ==
- 2013: University of Tartu Badge of Distinction
- 2023: Estonian National Research Award in the Humanities

== Publications ==
- 1992: Võõrastekaubanduse reguleerimine Narvas ja linna suhted Läänega XVII sajandi teisel poolel (Regulation of Foreign Trade in Narva and the City's Relations with the West in the Second Half of the 17th Century). Master's thesis. Supervisor: Helmut Piirimäe. Tartu, 1992.
- 1996: (editor) Arnold Soom. Mälestusi (Arnold Soom. Memoirs).Tartu: Eesti Ajalooarhiiv.
- 2000: (with Dirk-Gerd Erpenbeck) Narvaer Bürger- und Einwohnerbuch 1581–1704 (The Narva Citizen and Resident Register 1581–1704). Dortmund: Forschungsstelle Ostmitteleuropa.
- 2001: Rootsi majanduspoliitika Narva kaubanduse küsimuses 17. sajandi teisel poolel (Swedish Economic Policy Regarding Narva Trade in the Second Half of the 17th Century). Dissertation. Tartu: Eesti Ajalooarhiiv.
- 2002: (editor) Läänemere provintside arenguperspektiivid Rootsi suurriigis 16./17. sajandil (Development Prospects of the Baltic Sea Provinces in Sweden as a World Power in the 16th/17th Centuries). Tartu: Eesti Ajalooarhiiv.
- 2004: "Über die Grösse der Bevölkerung Narvas und Ivangorods in der Mitte des 17. Jahrhunderts" (The Population Size of Narva and Ivangorod in the Middle of the 17th Century). In: Aus der Geschichte Alt-Livlands: Festschrift für Heinz von zur Mühlen zum 90. Geburtstag. Münster: LIT.
- 2005: "Johann Köler und die Druckerei in Narva 1695 bis 1705" (Johann Köler and the Printing Press in Narva 1695 to 1705). In: Buch und Bildung im Baltikum: Festschrift für Paul Kaegbein zum 80. Geburtstag. Munich: LIT.
- 2006: (editor) Läänemere provintside arenguperspektiivid Rootsi suurriigis 16/17. sajandil. II (Development Prospects of the Baltic Sea Provinces in Sweden as a World Power in the 16th/17th Centuries. II). Tartu: Eesti Ajalooarhiiv.
- 2008: (with Aive Küng and Toomas Türk) Eesti rahvuslik postiteenistus 90 (Estonian National Postal Service 90). Tartu: Eesti Post, Postimuuseum.
- 2022: Mercuriuse ja Marsi vahel: Hansalinn Tallinn Rootsi riigi haardes. 1561–1632 (Between Mercury and Mars: The Hanseatic City of Tallinn under Swedish Rule. 1561–1632). Tallinn: Tallinna Linnaarhiiv.
