= Elbu =

Village in Estonia

Coordinates: 58°31′N 24°32′E

- Village
- Interactive map of Elbu
- Country: Estonia
- County: Pärnu County
- Parish: Tori Parish
- Time zone: UTC+2 (EET)
  - Summer (DST): UTC+3 (EEST)

Elbu is a village in Tori Parish, Pärnu County, in southwestern Estonia. Between 1992 and 2017, the village belonged to Are Parish. After the administrative reform of Estonian local governments, the village was incorporated into in Tori Parish.
