= Nõmme, Lääne-Viru County =

Village in Estonia

Coordinates: 59°02′46″N 26°12′41″E

Nõmme
- Village
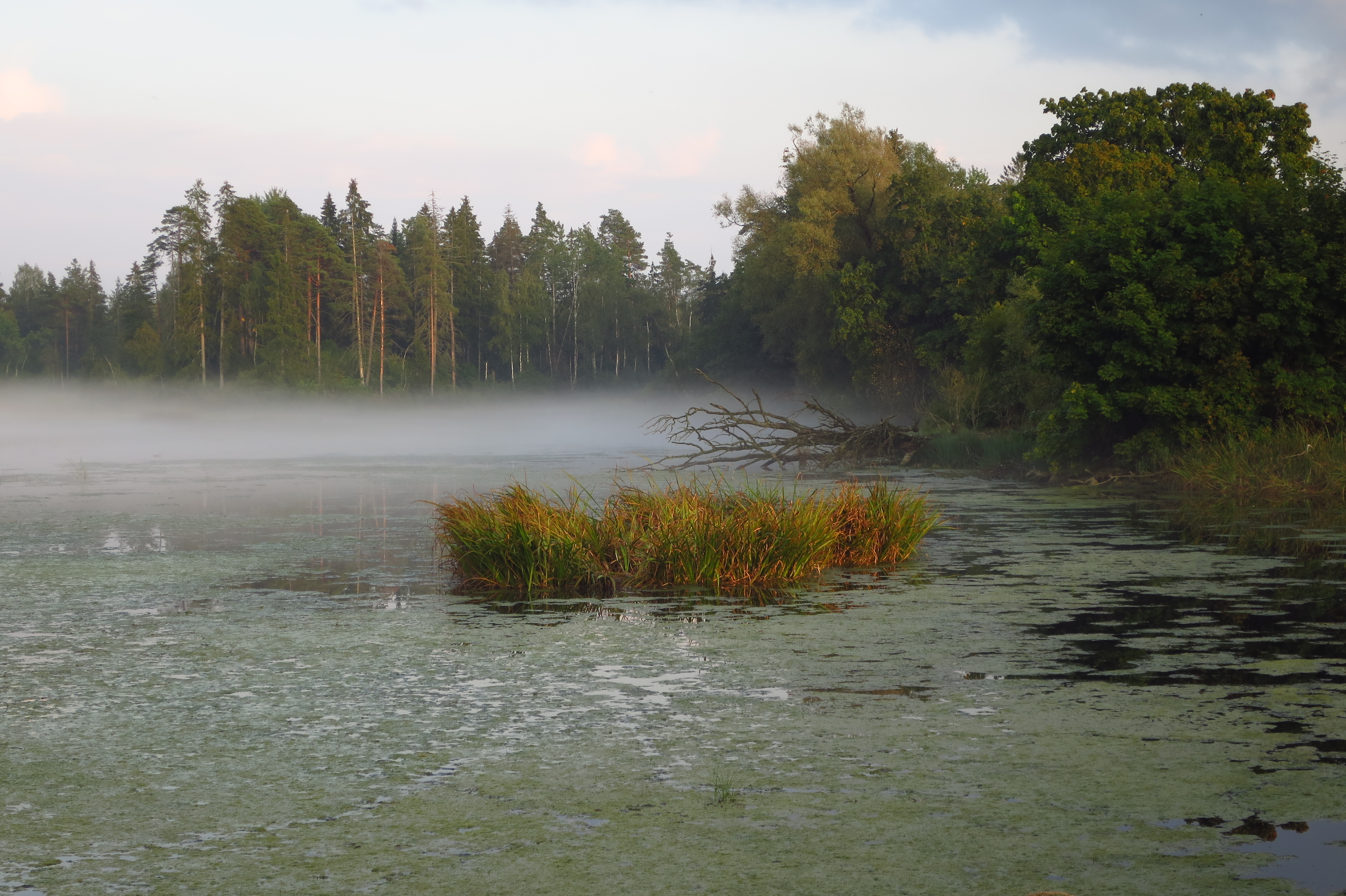
- Nõmme Veskijärv, a lake in Nõmme
- Interactive map of Nõmme
- Country: Estonia
- County: Lääne-Viru County
- Parish: Väike-Maarja Parish
- Time zone: UTC+2 (EET)
  - Summer (DST): UTC+3 (EEST)

Nõmme (German: Nömme) is a village in Väike-Maarja Parish, Lääne-Viru County, in northeastern Estonia.

== Name ==
Nõmme was attested in historical sources as [Ass mit dem] Nömmeschen Dorf in 1782, Nöm̄e in 1796, Nömme-M. in 1826, and Nomme and Nömme in 1844. The name comes from the common noun nõmm (genitive: nõmme) 'heath, moor, moorland', referring to the local geography.

== Notable people ==
Notable people that were born or lived in Nõmme include the following:

- Arnold Soom (1900–1977), historian
