= Eavere =

Village in Estonia

Coordinates: 58°33′N 24°35′E

- Village
- Interactive map of Eavere
- Country: Estonia
- County: Pärnu County
- Parish: Tori Parish
- Time zone: UTC+2 (EET)
  - Summer (DST): UTC+3 (EEST)

Eavere is a village in Tori Parish, Pärnu County in southwestern Estonia. Between 1992 and 2017, the village belonged to Are Parish, after the administrative reform of Estonian local governments, the village was incorporated into in Tori Parish.
