= Parisselja =

Village in Estonia

Coordinates: 58°33′N 24°32′E

- Village
- Interactive map of Parisselja
- Country: Estonia
- County: Pärnu County
- Parish: Tori Parish
- Time zone: UTC+2 (EET)
  - Summer (DST): UTC+3 (EEST)

Parisselja is a village in Tori Parish, Pärnu County in southwestern Estonia. Prior to the administrative reform of Estonian local governments in 2017, the village was part of Are Parish. Parisselja with a small population of 38 as of the 2021 census, with a balanced distribution of age groups and a slightly higher number of women than men.
