= Victoria Bastion =

Bastion in Narva, Estonia

Coordinates: 59°22′52″N 28°12′15″E

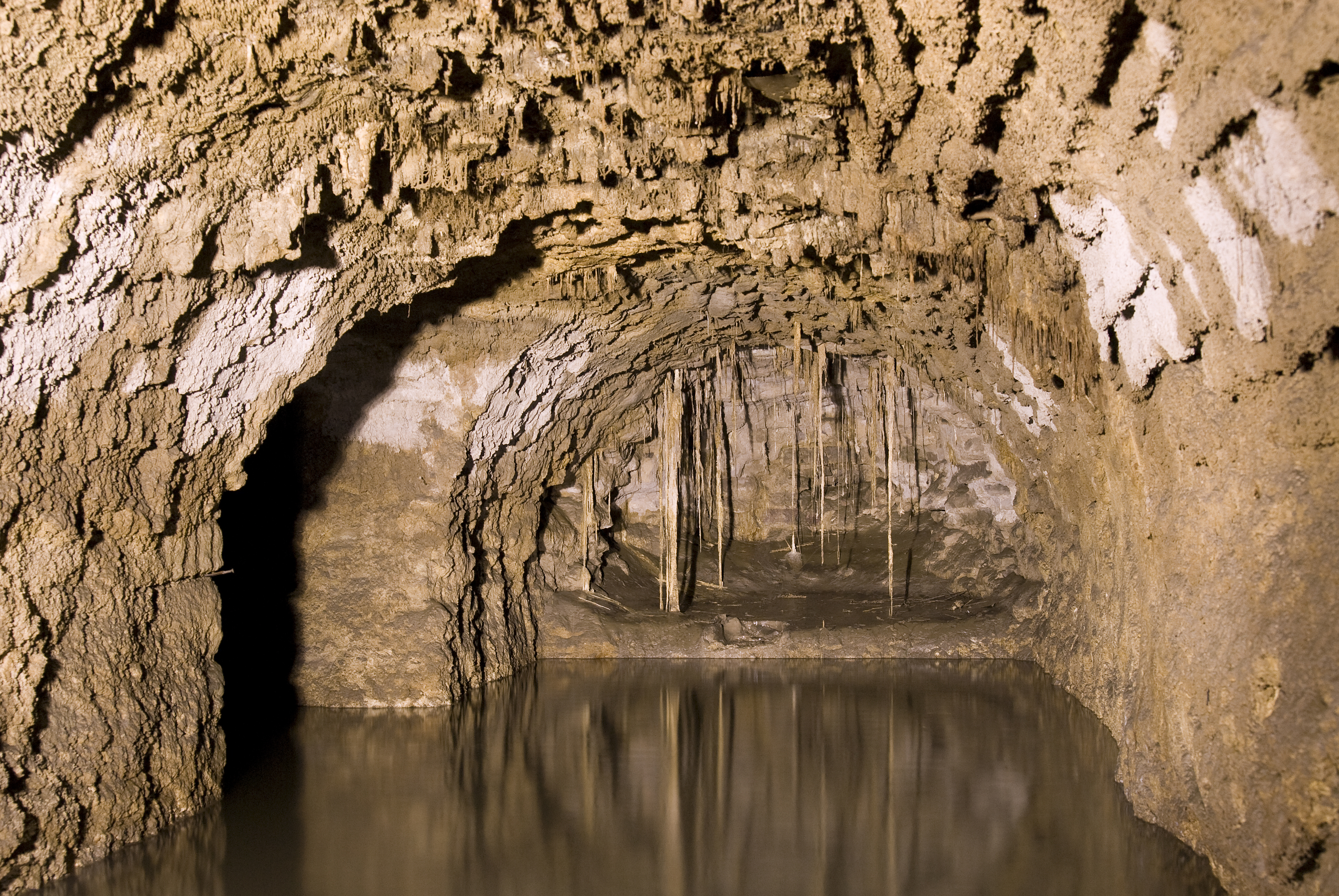
Interior of the Victoria Bastion

The Victoria Bastion is a fortified structure designed by Erik Dahlberg in Narva, Estonia built in 1683–1704. It is one of the seven Narva Bastions. The bastion was destroyed in 1704 during the Great Northern War between Sweden and Russia and was rebuilt after the war. It is officially listed as part of the cultural heritage in Estonia.

Narva's largest bat colony lives in the bastion.
