= Narva Bastions =

17th century bastions in Estonia

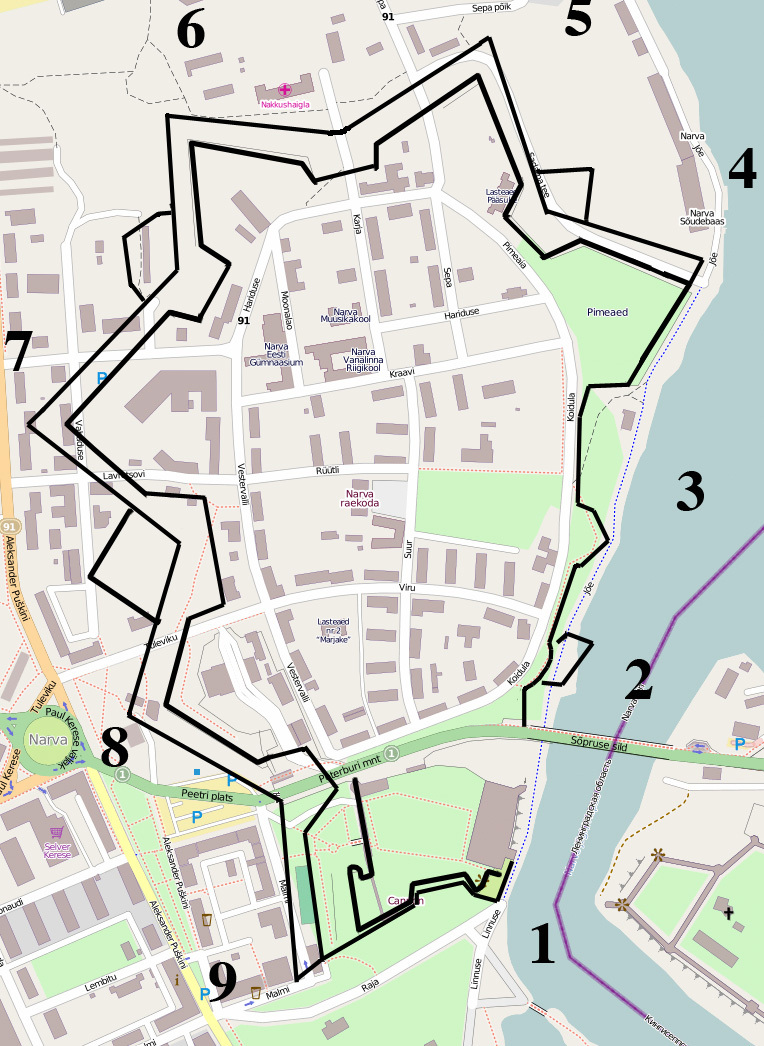
Narva fortress and bastions (numbers 1-9)

Narva bastions (Estonian: Narva bastionid) are bastions around Narva, Estonia.

In the 17th century, Narva was a border city between Sweden and Russia. To protect the city, strong fortifications (including bastions) were built during Sweden era. Fortifications were designed by military engineer and architect Erik Dahlberg. In total, seven bastions were built: Honor, Gloria, Victoria, Fama, Triumph, Fortuna, and Spes. Before massive construction works, one bastion already existed and it was renamed from Wrangel to Paks ('Fat').

Until today, all bastions (except Fama) have survived.
