= Narva Museum =

Museum in Estonia

- Narva Muuseum
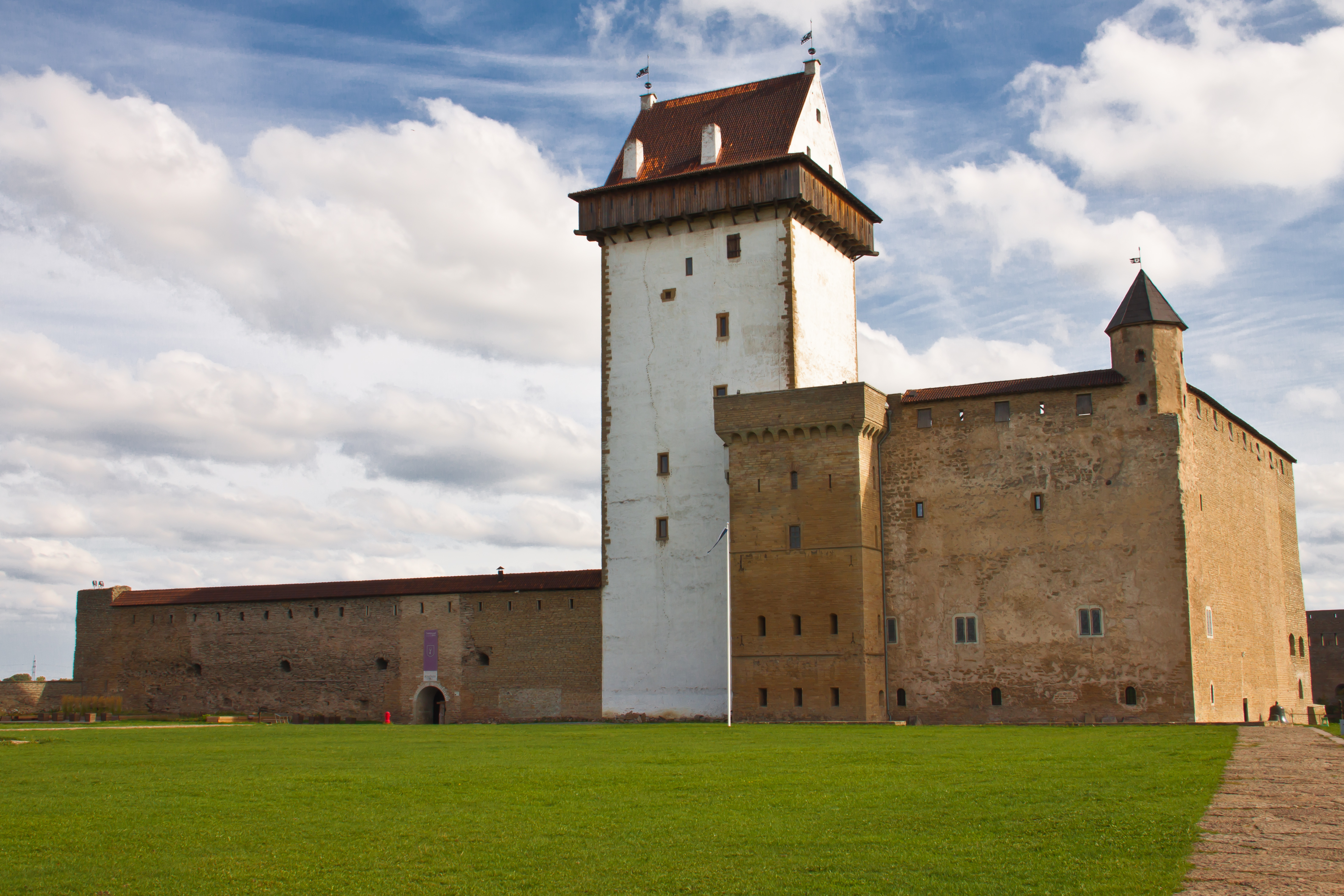
- Narva Castle
- Location: Peterburi maantee 2, 20308 Narva, Estonia
- Coordinates: 59°22′31″N 28°12′06″E
- Website: www.narvamuuseum.ee

Narva Museum (Estonian: Narva muuseum) is a museum in Narva, Estonia. The museum is composed of the Narva Castle, the Northern Yard, and the Narva Art Gallery.

In summer 2020, new exhibition was opened in Narva Castle. This exhibition gives overview of Narva from the 13th century to the beginning of the 20th century.

The Northern Yard depicts the district of artisans, who worked in Narva since 17th century.

The Narva Art Gallery was opened in 1991.
