= Odamees (magazine) =

Estonian magazine (1919–1929)

- Editor: Friedebert Tuglas, August Alle, Albert Kivikas
- Categories: Cultural magazine
- Founded: 1919
- First issue: April 15, 1919
- Final issue: 1929
- Country: Estonia
- Based in: Tartu
- Language: Estonian

Odamees ('The Spearman') was an illustrated magazine published intermittently in Tartu, Estonia, dealing with cultural life.

The magazine appeared from April to June 1919 under the title Odamees: kirjanduse, kunsti ja teaduse ajakiri (The Spearman: A Magazine of Literature, Art, and Science) and then from August to October 1919 under the title Odamees: kirjanduslise humoori ja päevasündmuste nädalleht (The Spearman: A Weekly Magazine of Literary Humor and Current Events), and finally from 1922 to 1929 under the title Odamees (The Spearman).

The editor of the first issue of the magazine in 1919 was Friedebert Tuglas, succeeded by August Alle in August that year and followed by Albert Kivikas in 1922, and the editor-in-chief and publisher was Carl Sarap. A total of 40 issues were published. In 1924, Odamehe Suwiste Album (The Spearman Summer Album) was also published.

The magazine was printed in Berlin by E. Gutnoff's printing house (from 1922 to 1923 no. 5), then in Estonia by the Postimees printing house (1923 nos. 6 and 8, and in 1924 and 1926), by the Heinrich Laakmann printing house (1923 no. 7 and in 1925, as well as the 1924 Summer Album), and by the Eduard Bergmann printing house (from 1927 to 1929).
