= Voka =

Village in Estonia

Coordinates: 59°24′N 27°35′E

- Small borough
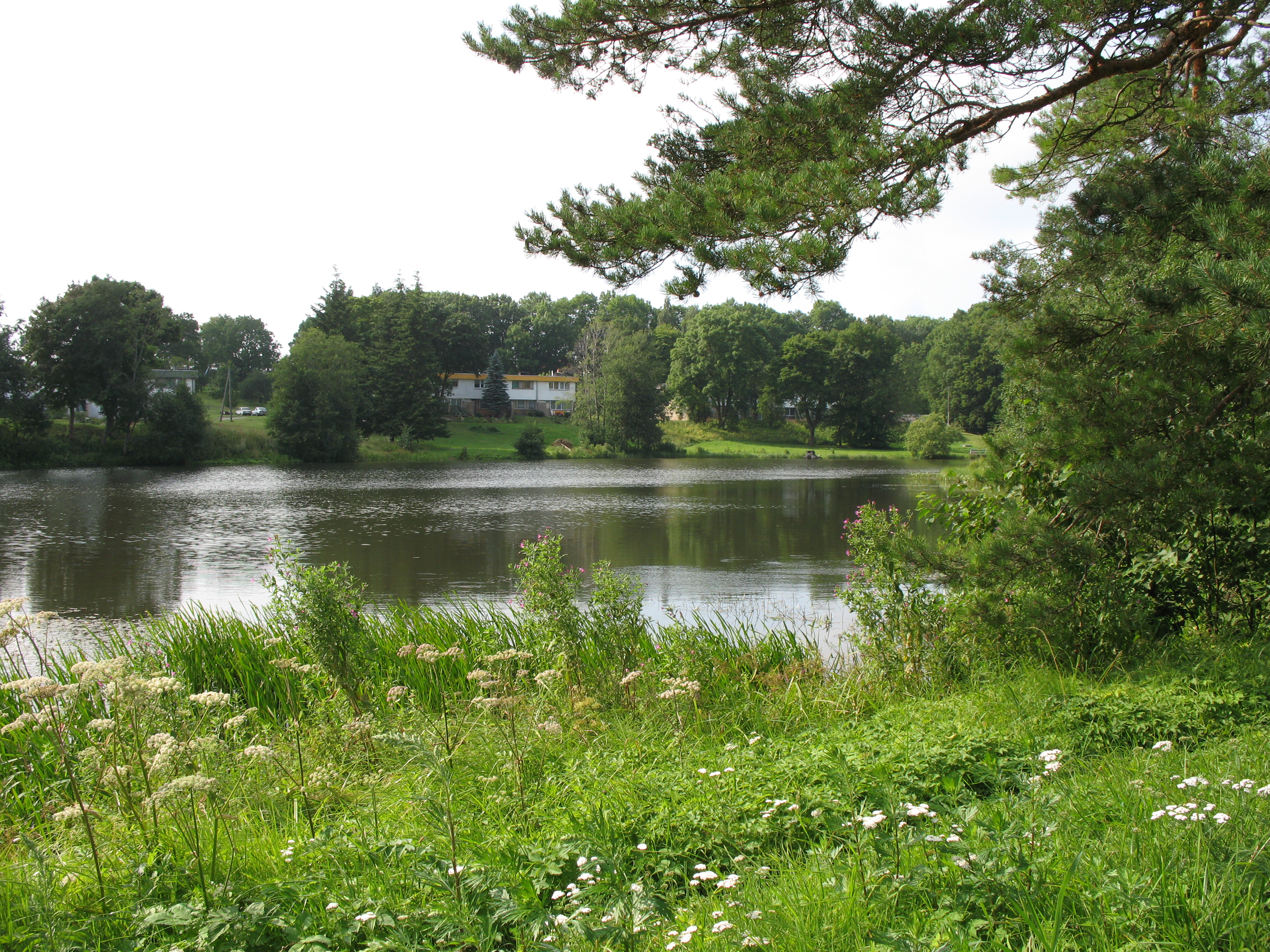
- Reservoir in Voka
- Interactive map of Voka
- Country: Estonia
- County: Ida-Viru County
- Parish: Toila Parish

Population (2011 Census)
  - Total: 823
- Time zone: UTC+2 (EET)
  - Summer (DST): UTC+3 (EEST)

Voka is a small borough (alevik) in Toila Parish, Ida-Viru County in northeastern Estonia. As of the 2011 census, the settlement's population was 823, of which the Estonians were 687 (83.5%).

== Name ==
The name of the borough of Voka is adapted from the surname of Johann Fock (listed in 1620 as Hans Fåk), who owned a manor in what was then the village of Kollota, southeast of today's borough. The manor was initially named Kollota Manor (Estonian: Kollota mõis), as attested in 1726. In 1781, the manor was bought by the Englishwoman Elizabeth Pierrepont, Duchess of Kingston-upon-Hull (née Elisabeth Chudleigh), who gave it the name Fokenhof and built a new clifftop manor north of today's borough overlooking the Baltic Sea. The site of that manor and the adjacent area appears on various older maps as Chudleig(h) and Чудлейгъ or Чадлейгъ. By the 18th century, the village of Voka southwest of the borough had acquired the name Voka. A new settlement named Voka was established in the 1920s at the site of Chudleigh's manor, and another in the 1970s near the post station, and these were merged in 1977 to become today's borough of Voka.

== Notable people ==
Notable people that were born or lived in Voka include the following:

- Elizabeth Pierrepont, Duchess of Kingston-upon-Hull (1721–1788), English courtier and courtesan
