= Ago Pajur =

Estonian historian (born 1962)

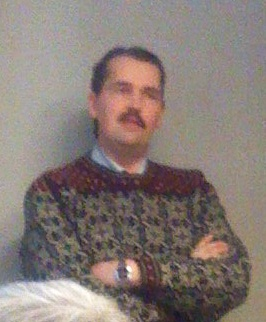
Ago Pajur

Ago Pajur (born 24 March 1962) is an Estonian historian. His principal fields of interest include the political history of Estonia in the first half of the 20th century, and the military history of Estonia in the 20th century.

Pajur was born in Türi. In 1999, he defended his doctoral thesis at the University of Tartu.

Since 1991, he has taught the history of Estonia at Tartu University.

In 2020, he was awarded the Order of the White Star, Fifth Class.
