= Are Parish =

Former municipality of Estonia

Are Parish Are vald
- Former municipality
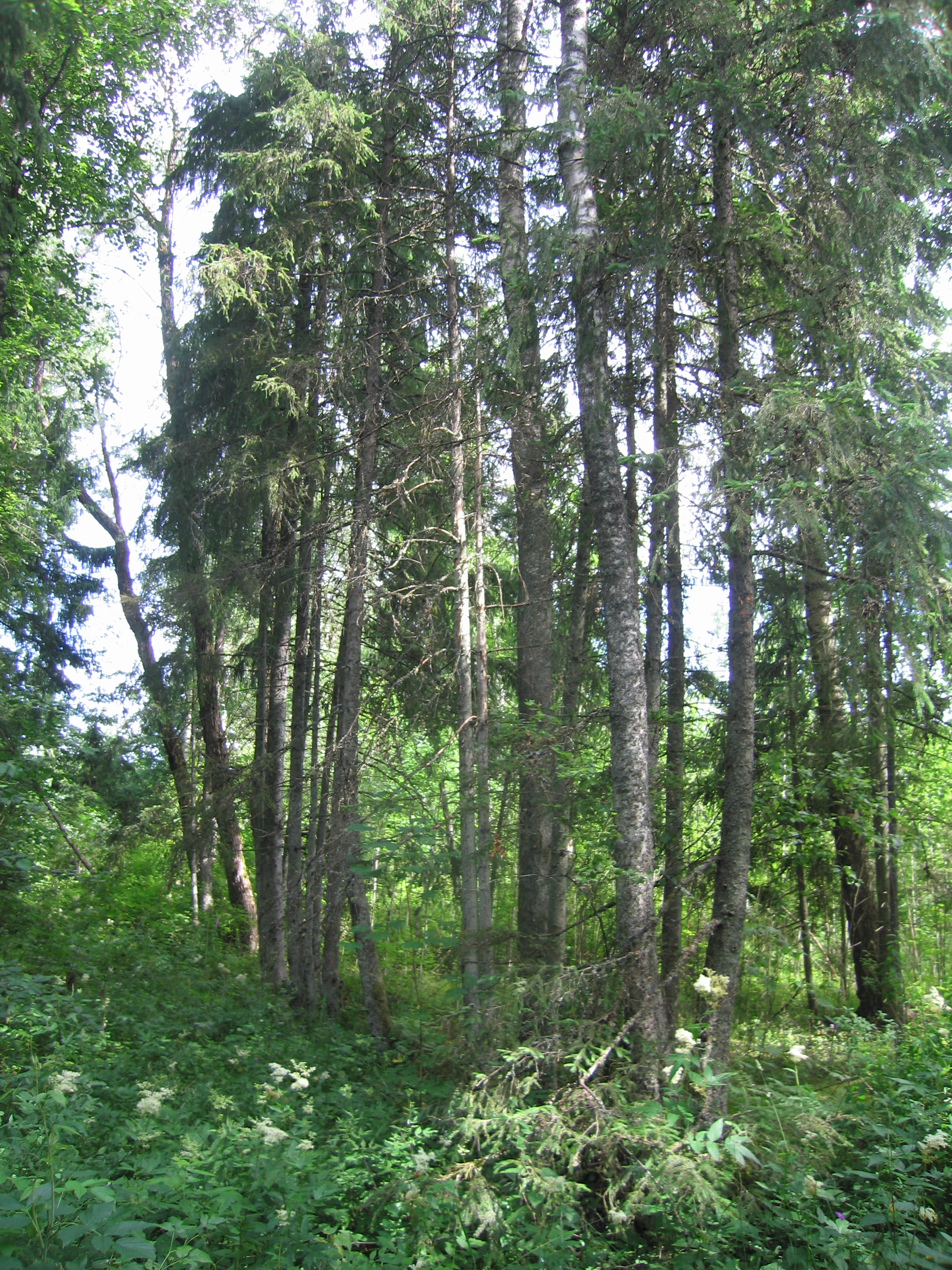

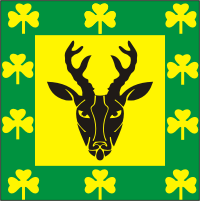
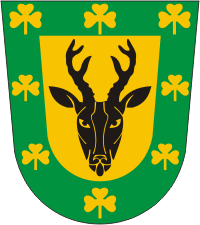
- Flag Coat of arms

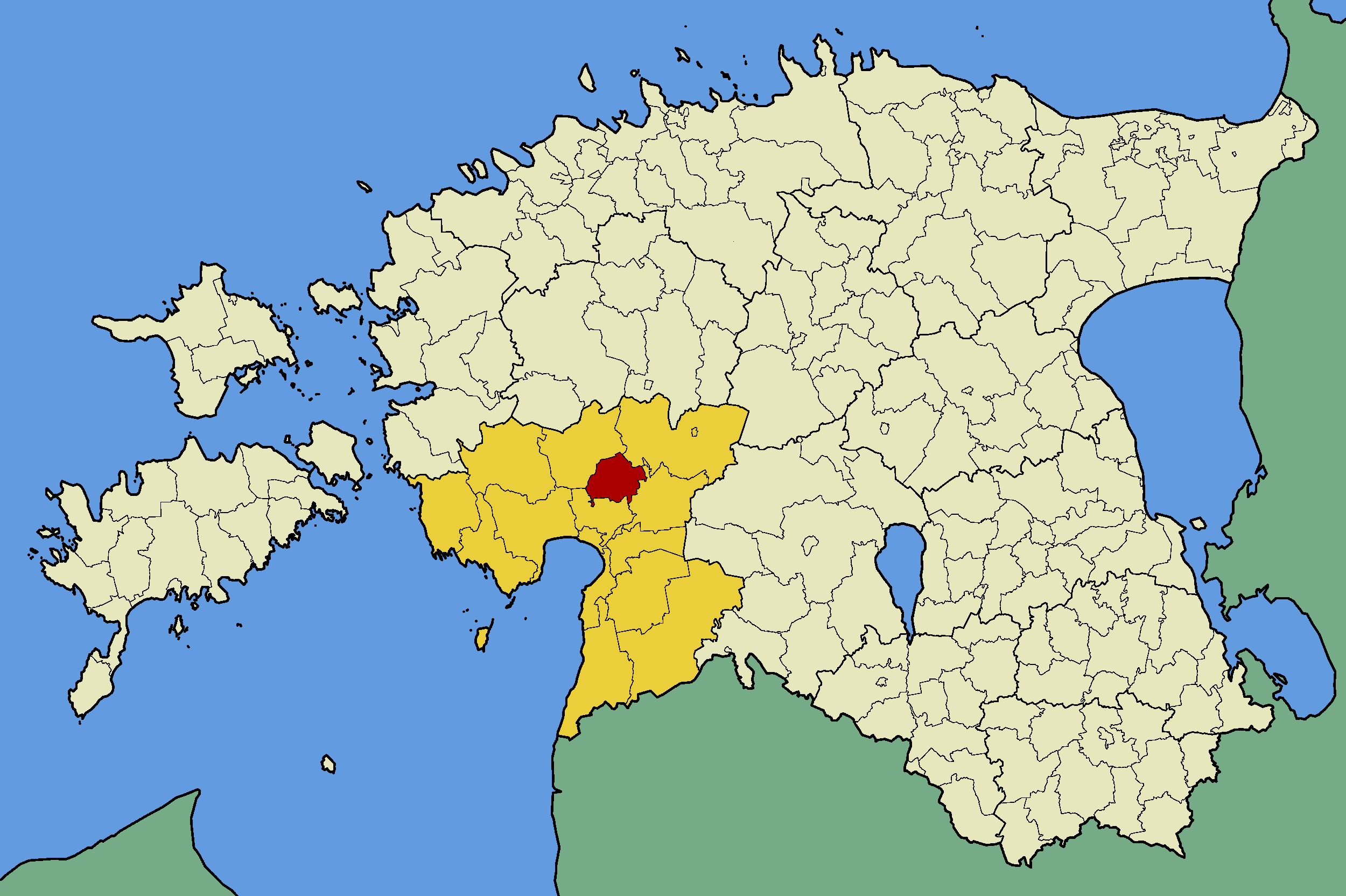
- Are Parish within Pärnu County.
- Country: Estonia
- County: Pärnu County
- Administrative centre: Are

Area
  - Total: 161 km^{2} (62 sq mi)

Population (01.01.2006)
  - Total: 1,332
  - Density: 8.27/km^{2} (21.4/sq mi)
- Website: www.arevald.ee

Are was a municipality located in Pärnu County, one of the 15 counties of Estonia.

== Settlements ==
Small borough

Are

Villages

Eavere, Elbu, Kurena, Lepplaane, Murru, Niidu, Parisselja, Pärivere, Suigu, Tabria, Võlla.
