= Võlla, Saare County =

Village in Estonia

Coordinates: 58°35′46″N 23°20′34″E

Võlla
- Village
- Interactive map of Võlla
- Country: Estonia
- County: Saare County
- Parish: Muhu Parish
- Time zone: UTC+2 (EET)
  - Summer (DST): UTC+3 (EEST)

Võlla is a village in Muhu Parish, Saare County in western Estonia.

Russian general Friedrich Wilhelm von Buxhoeveden (1750–1811) was born in Võlla Manor.
