= Ardino =

Ardino Ардино
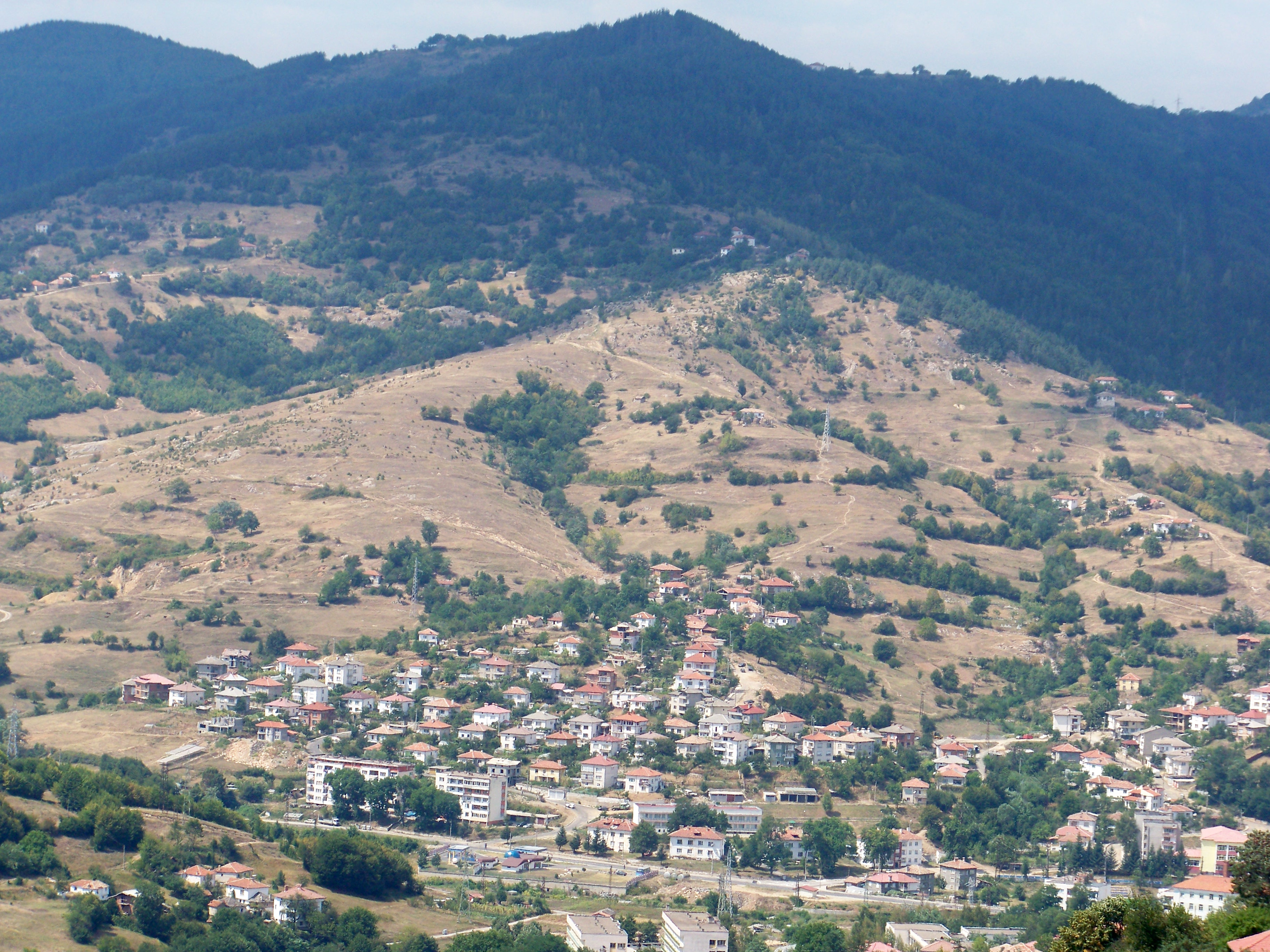
- Distant view of Ardino

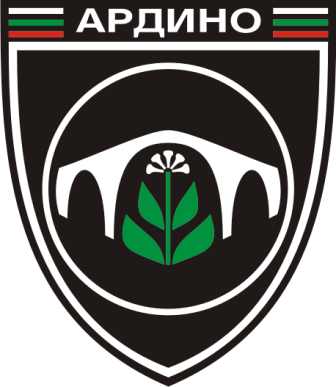
- Flag

- Location of Ardino
- Coordinates: 41°35′N 25°08′E
- Country: Bulgaria
- Province (Oblast): Kurdzhali

Government
  - Mayor: Izzet Shaban
- Elevation: 684 m (2,244 ft)

Population (15.12.2010)
  - Total: 4,185
- Time zone: UTC+2 (EET)
  - Summer (DST): UTC+3 (EEST)
- Postal Code: 6750
- Area code: 03651

Ardino (Bulgarian: Ардино, formerly Turkish: Eğridere) is a town in southern Bulgaria, in the Rhodope Mountains. It is located in Kardzhali Province and it is also close to Smolyan.

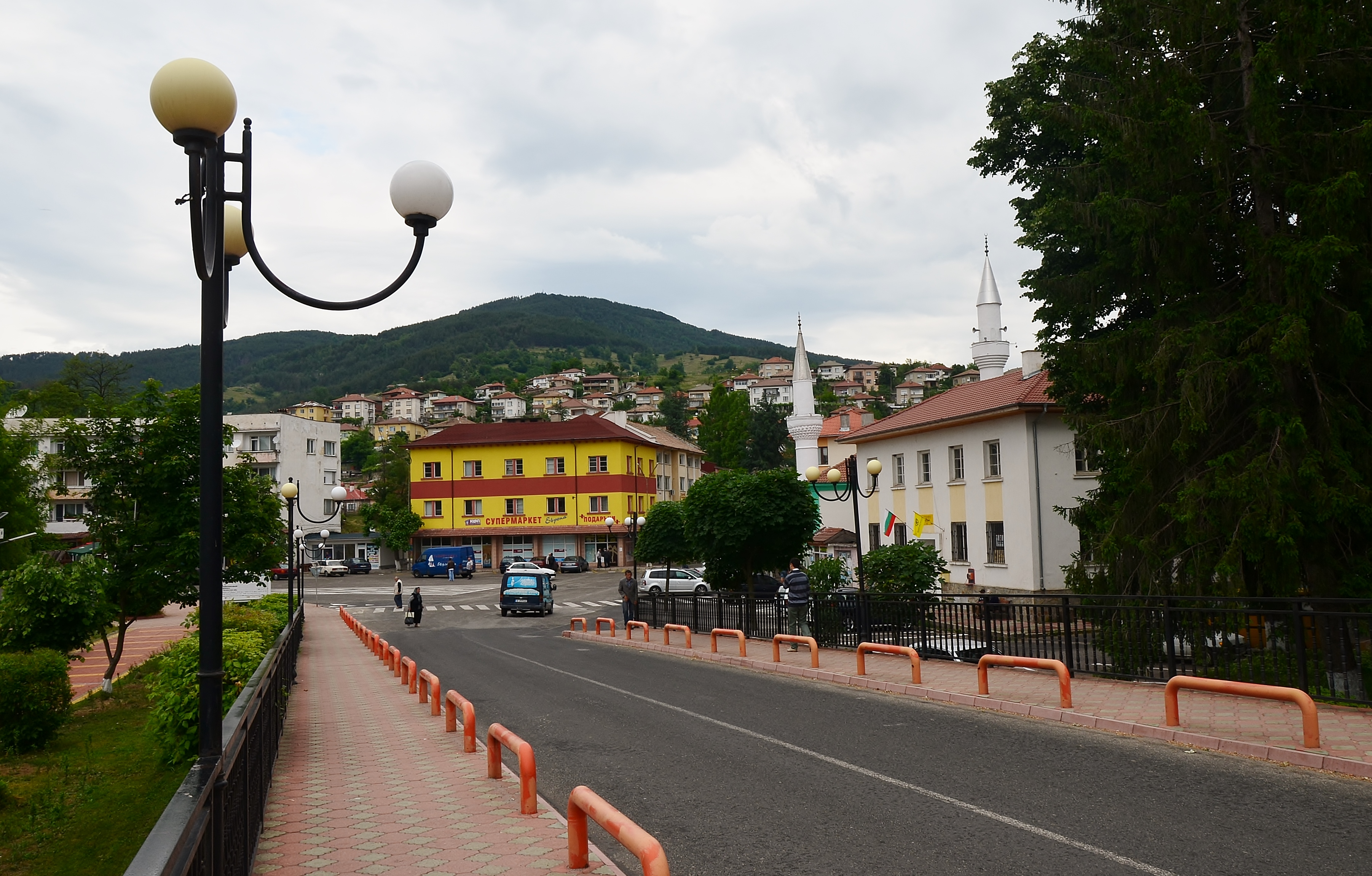
Main square in Ardino seen from the bridge.

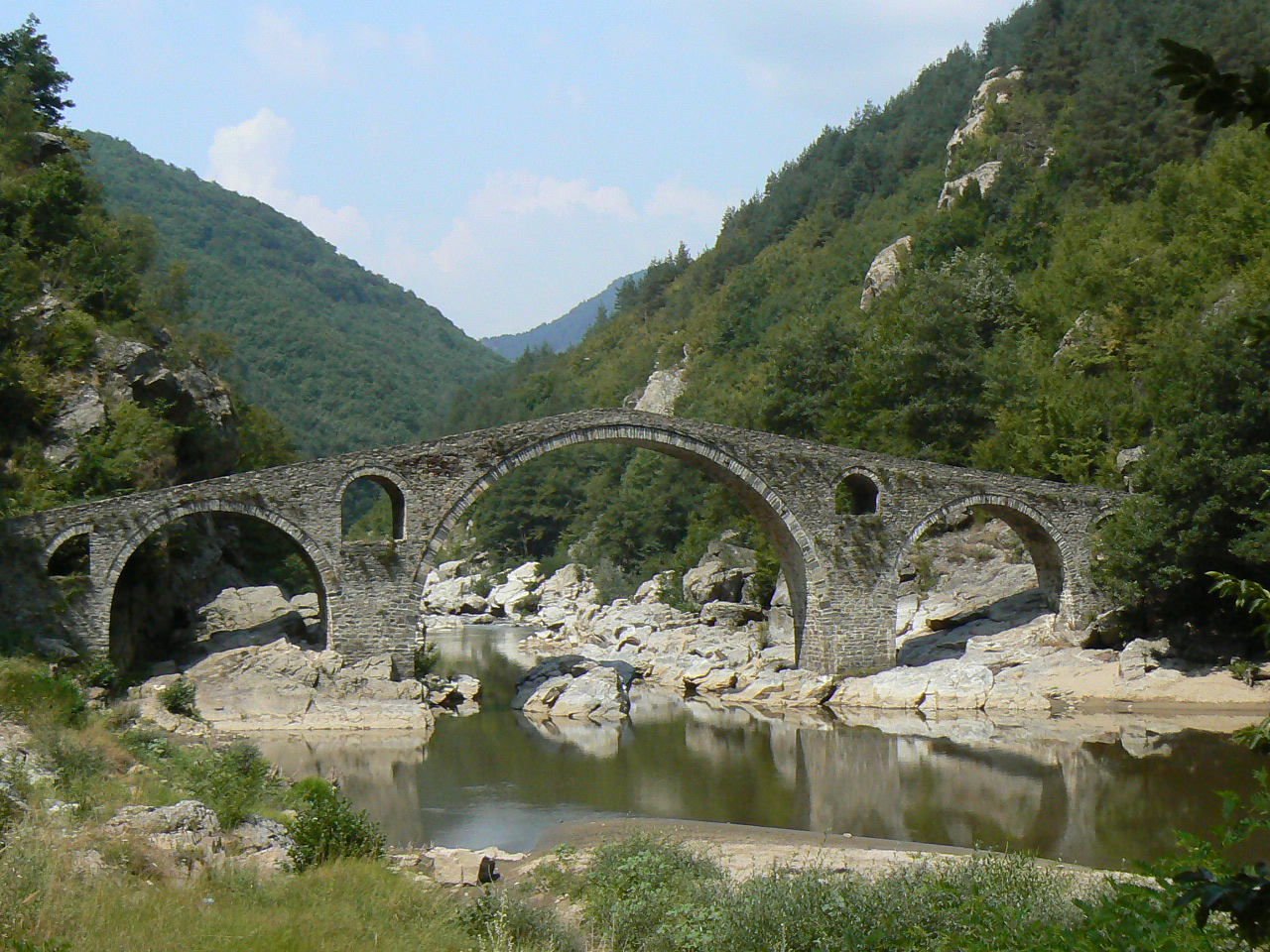
Devil's bridge near Ardino.

It is famous for its textile industry. It has a machine-building factory and a tobacco manufacturing industry. Tourist attractions include the Belite Brezi, the Eagle rocks, and the Dyavolski most (Devil's bridge).

== History ==
Under Ottoman rule, Ardino, then known in Turkish as Eğridere, was a kaza centre in the Sanjak of Gümülcine in the Adrianople Vilayet before the Balkan Wars. Ardino received its name in 1934 and was declared as a town in 1960. Ardino is the birthplace of Sabahattin Ali, Turkish novelist, poet and journalist.

== Villages ==
- Avramovo
- Ahryansko
- Bashevo
- Bistrogled
- Bogatino
- Borovitsa
- Brezen
- Byal izvor
- Chervena skala
- Chernigovo
- Chubrika
- Glavnik
- Golobrad
- Gorno Prahovo
- Gurbishte
- Dedino
- Doyrantsi
- Dolno Prahovo
- Dyadovtsi
- Enyovche
- Hromitsa
- Iskra
- Kitnitsa
- Kroyachevo
- Latinka
- Levtsi
- Lenishte
- Lyubino
- Mak
- Mlechino
- Musevo
- Padina
- Paspal
- Pesnopoy
- Pravdolyub
- Ribartsi
- Rodopsko
- Rusalsko
- Svetulka
- Sedlartsi
- Sinchets
- Spoluka
- Srunsko
- Star chitak
- Stoyanovo
- Suhovo
- Temenuga
- Turna
- Turnoslivka
- Yabulkovets
- Zhaltusha

== Notable natives ==
- Sabahattin Ali (1907–1948), Turkish novelist, short-story writer, poet, and journalist
