= Pravdolyub =

- Village
- Location within Bulgaria
- Coordinates: 41.533°N 25.267°E
- Country: Bulgaria
- Province: Kardzhali Province
- Municipality: Ardino

Area
  - Total: 4.436 km^{2} (1.713 sq mi)

Population (2007)
  - Total: 204
- Time zone: UTC+2 (EET)
  - Summer (DST): UTC+3 (EEST)

Pravdolyub (Bulgarian: Правдолюб) is a village in Ardino Municipality, Kardzhali Province, southern-central Bulgaria. It is located 205.476 kilometres (127.677 mi) southeast of Sofia. It covers an area of 4.436 square kilometres and as of 2007 it had a population of 204 people.

== Landmarks ==
Located 6 kilometers west of neighboring village Dyadovtsi is the Devil's Bridge, built in the early 1500s. The bridge has not been altered for 500 years and features a hexagon carving on its central arch, known as "The Seal of Solomon."

About 7 kilometers south of Pravdolyub, the Eagle Rocks area has a Thracian site with a large rock that has 90 carved niches. This site dates back to between the 6th and 4th centuries B.C. and was used for rituals and burials.

In the same Eagle Rocks area, roughly 500 meters from the Thracian site, are the ruins of Kaleto Fortress. This site is recognized as a protected cultural monument.

North of Pravdolyub, about 24 kilometers near Bashevo, you can find Krivus Fortress. Built in the 10th century, it was used to guard the area around the Arda River. The fortress has remnants of walls up to 5 meters tall, some towers, an entrance, and the remains of an old church.

Close by, on a rocky spot along the left side of the Borovica River, is the Patmos Fortress. This fortress, also from the 10th century, has a well-preserved western wall and archaeological finds include parts of a basilica and a tower.
