= Mlechino =

- Village
- Location within Bulgaria
- Coordinates: 41.617°N 25.183°E
- Country: Bulgaria
- Province: Kardzhali Province
- Municipality: Ardino

Area
  - Total: 5.423 km^{2} (2.094 sq mi)

Population (2007)
  - Total: 314
- Time zone: UTC+2 (EET)
  - Summer (DST): UTC+3 (EEST)

Mlechino (Bulgarian: Млечино) is a village in Ardino Municipality, Kardzhali Province, southern-central Bulgaria. It is located 194.184 kilometres (120.660 mi) southeast of Sofia. It covers an area of 5.423 square kilometres and as of 2007 it had a population of 314 people.

== Landmarks ==
In Mlechino, a fountain reputed to have healing qualities can be found. Local lore claims the water, which flows from the roots of birch trees, can treat kidney ailments. Nearby, the only natural birch forest in the Rhodope Mountains is found.

About 3 kilometers north of Mlechino, the Mlechino Hut offers lodging for visitors exploring the area.

Northward, about 8 kilometers between Gorno and Dolno Prahovo, a mosque complex is located. This site features a mosque, a school, a stone fountain, and a tomb. Renovations were made between 2008 and 2009 to update the facilities.

Approximately 9 kilometers north of Mlechino, near Bashevo, stands the Krivus Fortress. Constructed in the 10th century, it was built to safeguard the Arda River region. Notable remains include defensive walls, towers, and the ruins of an old church.

Nearby, on a rocky point along the Borovitsa river, the Patmos Fortress is situated. Also from the 10th century, it has a largely intact western wall. Archaeological studies have revealed the remnants of a basilica and a tower.

Southwest of Dyadovtsi, around 15 kilometers away, is the Devil's Bridge, or Sheytan Kyupriya. This bridge, built in the early 16th century, has not been altered for over 500 years and features a distinctive hexagon engraving on its arch.
