= Lenishte =

- Village
- Location within Bulgaria
- Coordinates: 41.533°N 25.2°E
- Country: Bulgaria
- Province: Kardzhali Province
- Municipality: Ardino

Area
  - Total: 13.487 km^{2} (5.207 sq mi)

Population (2007)
  - Total: 122
- Time zone: UTC+2 (EET)
  - Summer (DST): UTC+3 (EEST)

Lenishte (Bulgarian: Ленище) is a village in Ardino Municipality, Kardzhali Province, southern-central Bulgaria. It is located 201.18 kilometres (125.01 mi) southeast of Sofia. It covers an area of 13.487 square kilometres and as of 2007 it had a population of 122 people.

== Landmarks ==
Approximately 14 kilometers northwest of the neighboring village of Dyadovtsi stands an old stone bridge from the early 1500s, known as the Devil’s Bridge. The bridge has remained unchanged for centuries and features a unique hexagon shape on its arch known as "The Sea; of Solomon."

Around 13 kilometers west of Lenishte, is the Eagle Rocks area featuring a large rock with about 90 carved niches. These niches are remnants from ancient Thracian times, used for rituals or burials.

Nearby, about 500 meters from the rock, are the remains of Kaleto Fortress. The site, with its old walls and defensive structures, is recognized for its historical significance.

Approximately 21 kilometers northwest of Lenishte, near Bashevo, are the ruins of Krivus Fortress. Built in the 10th century, this fort was designed to defend the area around the Arda River and still shows parts of its original walls and towers.

Along the left bank of the Borovitsa River, on a rocky outcrop, lies the Patmos Fortress. Dating from the 10th century, it features a largely preserved western wall and archaeological finds include parts of a basilica and a tower.
