= Gorno Prahovo =

- Village
- Location within Bulgaria
- Coordinates: 41.65°N 25.15°E
- Country: Bulgaria
- Province: Kardzhali Province
- Municipality: Ardino

Area
  - Total: 8.191 km^{2} (3.163 sq mi)

Population (2007)
  - Total: 561
- Time zone: UTC+2 (EET)
  - Summer (DST): UTC+3 (EEST)

Gorno Prahovo (Bulgarian: Горно Прахово) is a village in Ardino Municipality, Kardzhali Province, southern-central Bulgaria. It is located 189.762 kilometres (117.913 mi) from Sofia. It covers an area of 8.191 square kilometres and as of 2007 had a population of 561 people. The village of Gorno Prahovo annually hosts a unique traditional event, being a free fight tournament.

== Landmarks ==
In the southeastern area, approximately 21 kilometers from Dyadovtsi, lies a historical bridge known as the Devil's Bridge. This structure, constructed in the early 16th century, remains unchanged over the past 500 years. Notably, the bridge's central arch features an engraved hexagon often referred to as "The Seal of Solomon."

Moving northward, roughly 3 kilometers from Gorno Prahovo, the Krivus fortress near the village of Bashevo is another historical site. Erected in the 10th century, the fortress was designed to defend the Arda River region. Key features include substantial fortifying walls, reaching up to 5 meters, as well as towers, an entrance, and remnants of an ancient church.

A short distance from Krivus fortress, on a rocky peninsula along the Borovica River, the Patmos Fortress can be found. This 10th century fortress has a notably preserved western wall. Archaeological investigations have uncovered the remains of a basilica and a tower within its boundaries.

In the vicinity between Gorno Prahovo and Dolno Prahovo, specifically 3 kilometers northeast, there is a mosque complex situated on an elevated natural ground. This complex includes a mosque, a school, a stone fountain with a donation inscription, and a tomb. Renovations were carried out in 2008-2009, updating the facilities for pilgrims and students.
