= Mak, Kardzhali Province =

Mak
- Hamlet
- Location within Bulgaria
- Coordinates: 41.533°N 25.2°E
- Country: Bulgaria
- Province: Kardzhali Province
- Municipality: Ardino

Area
  - Total: 5.642 km^{2} (2.178 sq mi)
- Elevation: 561 m (1,841 ft)

Population (2007)
  - Total: 1
- Time zone: UTC+2 (EET)
  - Summer (DST): UTC+3 (EEST)

Mak (Bulgarian: Мак) is a small hamlet in Ardino Municipality, Kardzhali Province, southern-central Bulgaria. It is located 201.18 kilometres (125.01 mi) from Sofia. It lies at altitude of 561 metres (1,841 ft) to the southeast of Ardino and Sinchets, east of Gurbishte and southwest of Tsarkvitsa. It covers an area of 5.642 square kilometres and as of 2007 had a population of 1 person. The hamlet is dependent on Gurbishte for village functions, where there is also a village hall.
