= Spoluka =

- Village
- Location within Bulgaria
- Coordinates: 41.717°N 25.117°E
- Country: Bulgaria
- Province: Kardzhali Province
- Municipality: Ardino

Area
  - Total: 3.4 km^{2} (1.3 sq mi)

Population (2013)
  - Total: 18
- Time zone: UTC+2 (EET)
  - Summer (DST): UTC+3 (EEST)

Spoluka (Bulgarian: Сполука) is a village in Ardino Municipality, Kardzhali Province, southern-central Bulgaria. It is located 183.076 kilometres (113.758 mi) southeast of Sofia. It covers an area of 3.4 square kilometres and as of 2013 it had a population of 18 people.

Spoluka Point on Nordenskjöld Coast in Graham Land, Antarctica is named after the village.

== Landmarks ==
The Kardzhali Dam is located roughly 6 kilometers away from the village. It is a popular location for those interested in various water sports. Anglers often visit the dam as it supports a range of fish species, such as carp, catfish, tolostolob, zander, perch, and rudd.

Nearby, there’s a rock formation known as The Ring, which offers a scenic view of the dam and the surrounding landscape.

Approximately 28 kilometers from Spoluka, the Krivus Fortress is accessible. Built in the 10th century, this fortress was constructed to safeguard the area around the Arda River in the Eastern Rhodopes. Notable features include old walls that stand up to 5 meters tall, towers, and the remnants of an ancient church located at its core.

Further along, on a rocky outcrop by the Borovica River, the Patmos Fortress is found. This fortress, also from the 10th century, has a well-preserved western wall. Archaeological work at this site has uncovered the foundations of a basilica and a tower.
