= Enyovche =

Coordinates: 41°31′N 25°04′E

- Village
- Interactive map of Enyovche
- Country: Bulgaria
- Province: Kardzhali Province
- Municipality: Ardino

Area
  - Total: 2.015 km^{2} (0.778 sq mi)

Population (2007)
  - Total: 264
- Time zone: UTC+2 (EET)
  - Summer (DST): UTC+3 (EEST)

Enyovche (Bulgarian: Еньовче) is a village in Ardino Municipality, Kardzhali Province, southern-central Bulgaria. It covers an area of 2.015 square kilometres and in 2007 had a population of 264.

== Landmarks ==
In the neighboring village of Zhaltusha, the historic house of Hadzhi Kadir can be located, a recognized cultural monument. The house is divided into two sections: the older part, which dates back over 150 years, and a larger addition that was constructed starting in 1939. Inside, find a collection of old artifacts such as a traditional loom, a burilka used for churning milk, and various wooden tools that have been preserved over the decades can be found.

Nearby, the Momini Gardi scenic peak can be located, while the Eastern Rhodopes are also home to Alada Peak, the highest point in the region at 1241 meters.

To the north of Enyovche, about 13 kilometers away in the Karaburun area, lies an ancient Thracian sanctuary and fortress. This site, which dates back to the 4th to 6th centuries BC, provides views of the Central and Eastern Rhodopes. The sanctuary features a large rock with approximately 90 trapezoidal niches that once held pottery and tiles used in ancient rituals and funerals.

Further west, near Ardino in the Eagle Rocks area, the ruins of the Kaleto fortress can be located. This site is recognized for its distinctive architectural style, characterized by an irregular circular shape with a diameter of 67 meters and an area of 0.5 acres. The fortress was built with stones set without mortar, demonstrating ancient construction techniques.
