= Dolno Prahovo =

- Village
- Location within Bulgaria
- Coordinates: 41.65°N 25.15°E
- Country: Bulgaria
- Province: Kardzhali Province
- Municipality: Ardino

Government
  - Mayor: Sali Ahmed (DPS)

Area
  - Total: 2.2223 km^{2} (0.8580 sq mi)

Population (2007)
  - Total: 125
- Time zone: UTC+2 (EET)
  - Summer (DST): UTC+3 (EEST)

Dolno Prahovo (Bulgarian: Долно Прахово) is a village in Ardino Municipality, Kardzhali Province, southern-central Bulgaria. It is located 189.762 kilometres (117.913 mi) from Sofia. It covers an area of 2.2223 square kilometres and as of 2007 had a population of 125 people.

== Landmarks ==
South of the village of Dyadovtsi, approximately 21 kilometers away, the Devil's Bridge stands as a historical site from the early 16th century. This bridge, untouched by reconstruction over the past 500 years, features an engraved hexagon on its central arch, known as The Seal of Solomon.

Approximately 3 kilometers northwest of Dolno Prahovo, near Bashevo, the Krivus fortress is located. This 10th century fortress was built to defend the Arda River region. It includes well-preserved fortifying walls up to 5 meters high, towers, an entrance, and the remains of an ancient church within its grounds.

Not far from the Krivus fortress, on a rocky peninsula along the left bank of the Borovica River, is the Patmos Fortress. Also from the 10th century, this fortress is notable for its western wall, which remains largely intact. Archaeological work at the site has uncovered remains of both a basilica and a tower.

Between the villages of Dolno Prahovo and Gorno Prahovo, on a natural elevation, a mosque complex can be visited. This complex includes a mosque, a madrasa (school), a stone fountain with a donation inscription, and a tomb. Renovations to the complex were completed in 2008-2009, updating the facilities for pilgrims and students.
