= Ahryansko =

- Village
- Location within Bulgaria
- Coordinates: 41.6°N 25.11667°E
- Country: Bulgaria
- Province: Kardzhali Province
- Municipality: Ardino

Area
  - Total: 6.839 km^{2} (2.641 sq mi)

Population (2007)
  - Total: 51
- Time zone: UTC+2 (EET)
  - Summer (DST): UTC+3 (EEST)

Ahryansko (Bulgarian: Ахрянско) is a village in Ardino Municipality, Kardzhali Province, southern-central Bulgaria. It is located 191.083 kilometres (118.733 mi) from Sofia. It covers an area of 6.839 square kilometres and in 2007 had a population of 51.

== Landmarks ==
To the north of neighboring village Ardino, near the confluence of the Davidkovska and Arda rivers, lies the natural landmark "Hladilnika." The "Dyavolskiyat Most" spans a narrow gorge on the Arda River offering a scenic view of the area. There is also a Natural Birch Reserve where the "Belite Brezi tourist complex can be found. This reserve is known for its air quality, and is one of the most significant areas for the development of tourism in the area.

Near Ardino, the Thracian sanctuary Orlovite Skali can be found, with the Kaleto Fortress located 500 meters away, listed as a historic site in 2003.
