= Padina, Kardzhali Province =

Padina
- Village
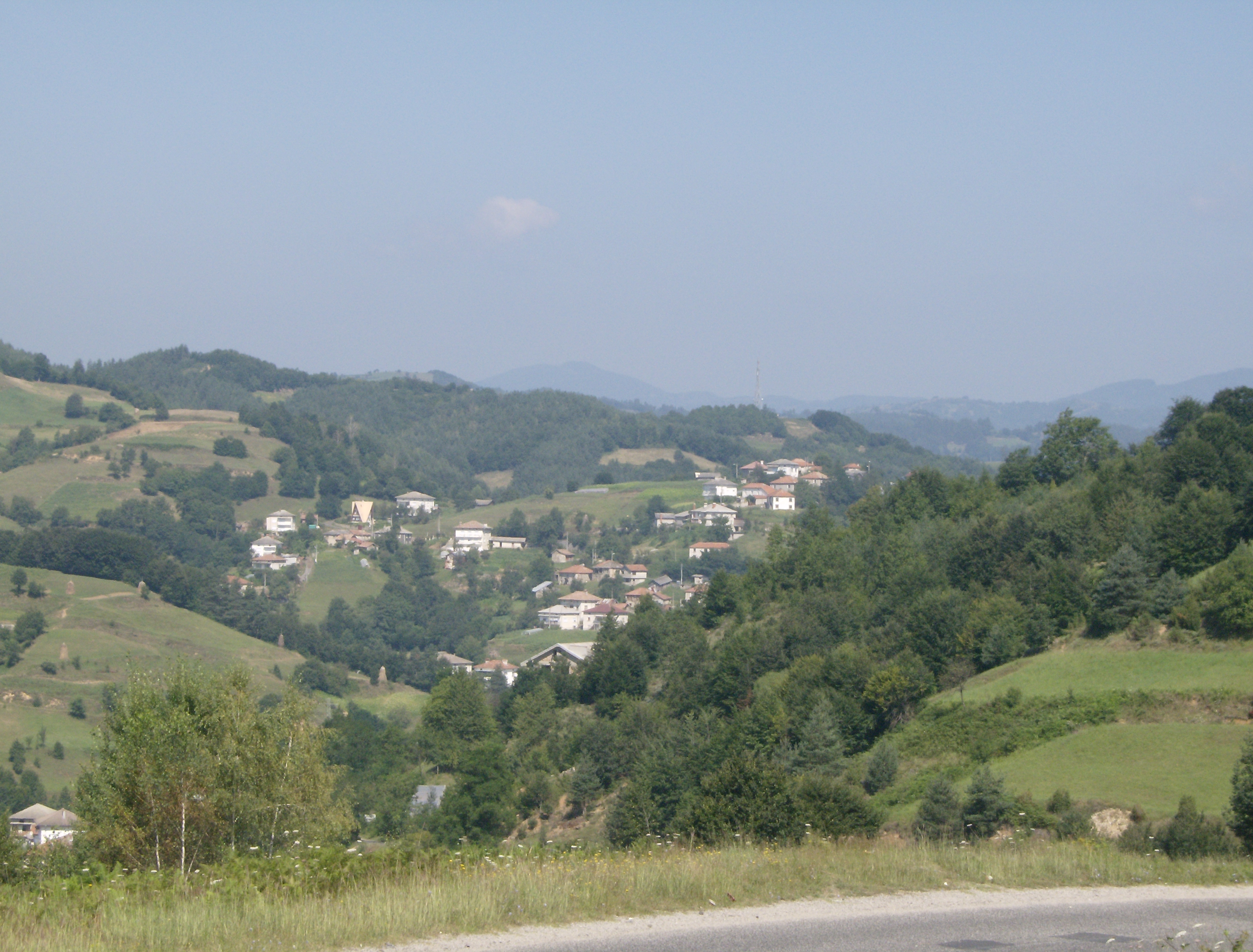

- Location within Bulgaria
- Coordinates: 41.5°N 25.067°E
- Country: Bulgaria
- Province: Kardzhali Province
- Municipality: Ardino

Area
  - Total: 10.411 km^{2} (4.020 sq mi)
- Elevation: 650 m (2,130 ft)

Population (2007)
  - Total: 1,030
- Time zone: UTC+2 (EET)
  - Summer (DST): UTC+3 (EEST)

Padina (Bulgarian: Падина) is a village in Ardino Municipality, Kardzhali Province, southern-central Bulgaria, located in a valley at the foot of Mount St. Elias (1001m). It is located 195.32 kilometres (121.37 mi) from Sofia,14.8 kilometres (9.2 mi) southwest of Ardino, and 4.8 kilometres (3.0 mi) by road south of Byal izvor. It covers an area of 10.411 square kilometres and as of 2007 had a population of 1030 people, although the population is rapidly declining and 851 were reported in 2010.

Padina has a continental Mediterranean climate, with a climate which is characterized by mild, humid winters and hot, dry summers. Crops include tobacco and potatoes, and small areas are favorable for growing sugar beets, strawberries and some vegetables ( tomatoes, peppers, beans, etc.). Over the last decades, several apple orchards have been established. The village operates a dairy farm that produces high quality cheese, yogurt, butter, melted and smoked cheese and curd. Padina has a primary school, kindergarten and community centre with a library.

== Landmarks ==
St. Iliya Peak, at 1001 meters, is located above the village with holiday villas at its base.

Eco paths lead to the following sites: the Devil's Bridge, an ancient bridge over the Arda River, 10 kilometers away; Orlovite Chuki, an ancient Thracian site, 1 kilometer away; and Kaleto Fortress, about 2 kilometers from the village.
