= Sanjak of Gümülcine =

Sancak-i Gümülcine
- Sanjak of the Ottoman Empire
- 1878–1912
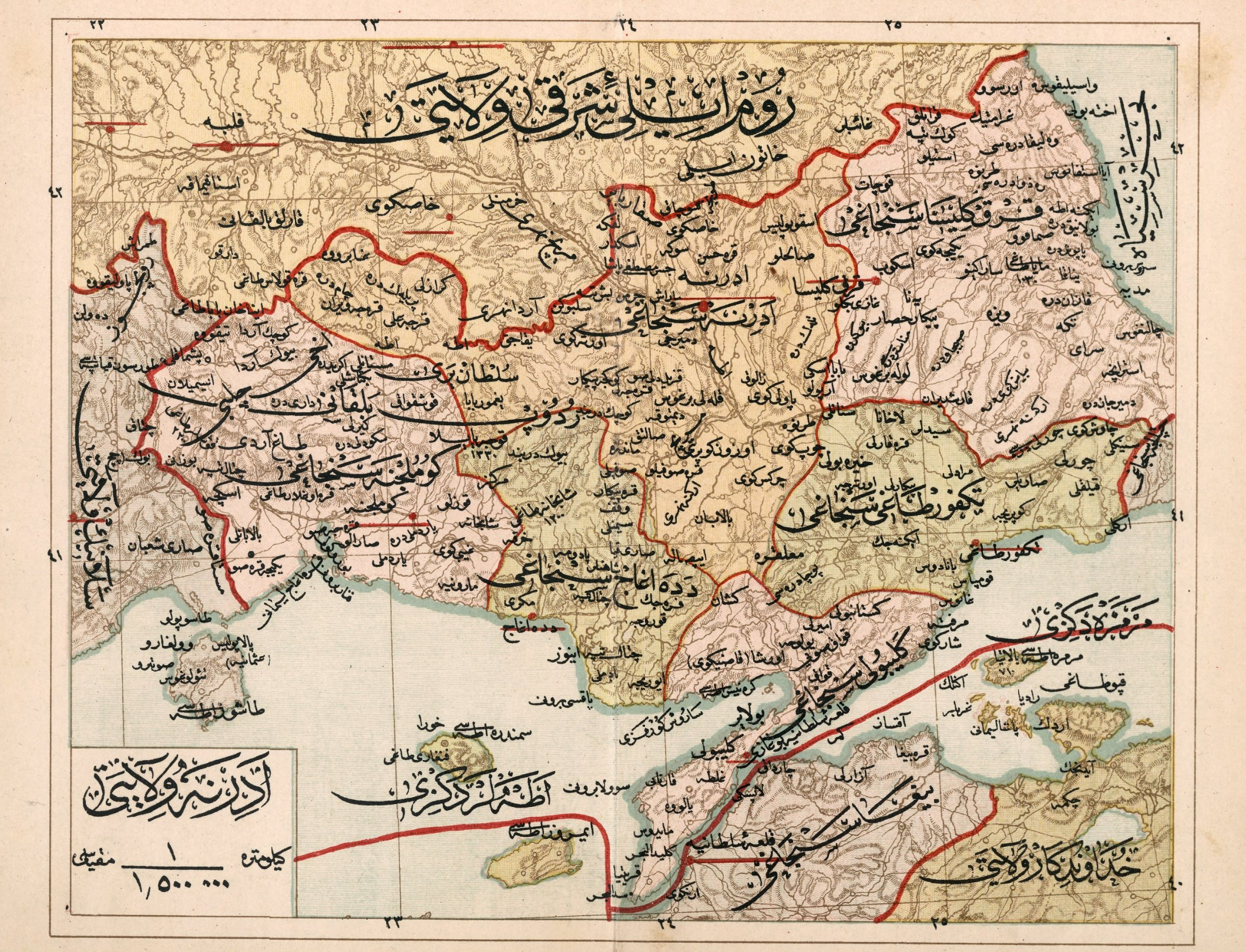
- 1907 Ottoman map of the Adrianople Vilayet, with the Sanjak of Gümülcine as the vilayet's westernmost province
- Capital: Gümülcine
- History
  - Established: 1878
  - First Balkan War: 1912
Preceded by
Sanjak of Gallipoli
Sanjak of Filibe
Sanjak of Drama
Succeeded by
Kingdom of Bulgaria
- Today part of: Bulgaria; Greece

The Sanjak of Gümülcine (Ottoman Turkish: Sancak-i Gümülcine, Greek: Υποδιοίκησις Γκιουμουλτζίνας, Bulgarian: Гюмюрджински санджак) was a second-level province (sanjak) of the Ottoman Empire in Thrace, forming part of the Adrianople Vilayet. Its capital was Gümülcine, modern Komotini in Greece.

== History and administrative division ==
The sanjak of Gümülcine was created in 1878 out of the territory of the sanjaks of Gallipoli and Filibe (Plovdiv) from the Adrianople Vilayet, as well as parts of the sanjak of Drama of the Salonica Vilayet.

It comprised six sub-provinces or kazas, which were further subdivided into nahiyes:

- Kaza of Gümülcine (mod. Komotini): Seyh Cumaya, Kirli or Girli, Çakal, Celebiye, Şehir (Gümülcine urban area), Saphane, Yasi, Maronya, Kura-i Cedid
- Kaza of Sultan Yeri (mod. Krumovgrad): Ada, Tashli, Güve, Teke, Mestanlı
- Kaza of Ahi Çelebi (mod. Smoljan): Ismilan, Çitak, Karsili, Pasavik, Tozburun, Söğütçük
- Kaza of İskeçe (mod. Xanthi): Yenice, Sakar Kaya, Celepli, Cedid, Yassiören
- Kaza of Eğri Dere (mod. Ardino): Mesgulli, Küçük Viran, Davud, Hotaşlı and Dolastir, Rupçoz (retroceded by Bulgaria in 1886)
- Kaza of Dari Dere (mod. Zlatograd): Şahin, Ak Bunar

The sanjak survived until it was occupied by Bulgarian troops in the First Balkan War (1912–1913), after which it came under Bulgarian control. In 1919, after World War I, the southern portions came under Allied administration with the Treaty of Neuilly, and in 1920 they came under Greek control, forming the prefectures of Xanthi and Rhodope.
