= Gurbishte =

- Village
- Location within Bulgaria
- Coordinates: 41.55°N 25.15°E
- Country: Bulgaria
- Province: Kardzhali Province
- Municipality: Ardino

Area
  - Total: 14.494 km^{2} (5.596 sq mi)

Population (2007)
  - Total: 183
- Time zone: UTC+2 (EET)
  - Summer (DST): UTC+3 (EEST)

Garbishte (Bulgarian: Гърбище) is a mountain village in Ardino Municipality, Kardzhali Province, southern-central Bulgaria. It is located 196.78 kilometres (122.27 mi) from Sofia and 13.6 kilometres (8.5 mi) by winding road south of Ardino. It lies to the southwest of Sinchets, and northeast of Padina. It covers an area of 14.494 square kilometres and as of 2007 had a population of 183 people. The village contains a village hall.
