= Rusalsko =

- Village
- Location within Bulgaria
- Coordinates: 41.717°N 25.15°E
- Country: Bulgaria
- Province: Kardzhali Province
- Municipality: Ardino

Area
  - Total: 7.925 km^{2} (3.060 sq mi)

Population (2007)
  - Total: 60
- Time zone: UTC+2 (EET)
  - Summer (DST): UTC+3 (EEST)

Rusalsko (Bulgarian: Русалско) is a village located in Ardino Municipality, Kardzhali Province, Bulgaria. It is about 185 kilometres (115 mi) southeast of Sofia. It covers an area of about 7.9 square kilometres (3.1 mi^{2}), and as of 2007 it had a population of 60 people.

== Landmarks ==
Kardzhali Dam is about 10 kilometers southeast of Rusalsko. It’s a spot for water activities and fishing. Various fish like carp, catfish, tolostolob, zander, perch, and rudd are found here.

Nearby is a rock formation called The Ring, which offers a view of the dam and surrounding hills.

Around 25 kilometers from Rusalsko is Krivus Fortress. Built in the 10th century, this fortress was used for guarding the Arda River area. It includes some old walls up to 5 meters high, towers, an entrance, and the remains of an ancient church.

Also close by, on a rocky outcrop along the Borovitsa River, is the Patmos Fortress. This 10th-century fortress has a well-preserved western wall and remnants of a basilica and tower have been discovered through excavation.
