= Svetulka, Ardino Municipality =

Svetulka Светулка
- Village
- Location within Bulgaria
- Coordinates: 41.567°N 25.1°E
- Country: Bulgaria
- Province: Kardzhali Province
- Municipality: Ardino

Area
  - Total: 7.624 km^{2} (2.944 sq mi)

Population (2007)
  - Total: 182
- Time zone: UTC+2 (EET)
  - Summer (DST): UTC+3 (EEST)

Svetulka (Bulgarian: Светулка) (Turkish: Çandır) is a village in Ardino Municipality, Kardzhali Province, southern-central Bulgaria. It is located 192.393 kilometres (119.547 mi) southeast of Sofia. It covers an area of 7.624 square kilometres and as of 2007 it had a population of 182 people.

== Landmarks ==
Momini Gardi, a peak close to the village, offers a scenic view for locals and tourists. Alada Peak, the tallest in the Eastern Rhodopes at 1241 meters, is also in this area.

About 20 kilometers north of the village stands the Devil's Bridge, an old structure over the Arda River. Built in the 1500s, it was constructed on top of a former Roman bridge that was part of an ancient route connecting the Aegean Sea and Thracian lands. In 2003, this site was officially recognized as a landmark.

To the northwest of Svetulka, around 13 kilometers away, the Karaburun area contains remnants of an old Thracian sanctuary and fortress. This location provides broad views of the Central and Eastern Rhodopes. The site, used from the late Bronze Age, dates back to the 4th and 6th centuries BC and includes a large rock with about 90 carved niches where artifacts related to death rituals were placed.

Half a kilometer from the sanctuary, in the Eagle Rocks area, the remains of Kaleto Fortress can be found. This fortress is characterized by its unusual circular design, spanning 67 meters in diameter, and built from stones without mortar, covering about 0.5 acres.

== Honours ==
Svetulka Island in Antarctica is named after the village of Svetulka.
