= Hromitsa =

- Village
- Location within Bulgaria
- Coordinates: 41°37′1″N 25°12′0″E
- Country: Bulgaria
- Province: Kardzhali Province
- Municipality: Ardino

Area
  - Total: 3.251 km^{2} (1.255 sq mi)

Population (2007)
  - Total: 43
- Time zone: UTC+2 (EET)
  - Summer (DST): UTC+3 (EEST)

Hromitsa (Bulgarian: Хромица) is a village in Ardino Municipality, Kardzhali Province, southern-central Bulgaria. It covers an area of 3.251 square kilometres and as of 2007 had a population of 43 people.

== Landmarks ==
Around 13 kilometers from the village Kardzhali Dam can be located. The dam itself is a popular local spot for a range of activities, including swimming, sailing, and fishing. It's known for its diverse fish population, such as carp and trout.

Travel northwest for about 10 kilometers from Hromitsa, the Krivus Fortress can be located. This 10th century fort was built to protect the area around the Arda River.

Further southwest, roughly 30 kilometers away, the Devil's Bridge can be located, spanning a narrow gorge over the River Arda. This medieval bridge, known as "Sheytan Kyupria" in Turkish, has historical significance in the region.

If you head northeast for about 42 kilometers, you'll reach the Perperikon archaeological site. This location features an collection of ancient ruins, including large stone structures, artifacts from different historical eras, and a medieval fortress, marking it as a notable cultural and historical location.
