= Dedino =

Dedino may refer to:

- Dedino, Kardzhali Province, Bulgaria
- Dedino, North Macedonia
