= Byal izvor =

Byal izvor Бял извор
- Village
- Location within Bulgaria
- Coordinates: 41.55°N 25.083°E
- Country: Bulgaria
- Province: Kardzhali Province
- Municipality: Ardino

Area
  - Total: 19.928 km^{2} (7.694 sq mi)

Population (2007)
  - Total: 1,713
- Time zone: UTC+2 (EET)
  - Summer (DST): UTC+3 (EEST)

Byal izvor (Bulgarian: Бял извор) is a village in Ardino Municipality, Kardzhali Province, southern-central Bulgaria. It is located 192.57 kilometres (119.66 mi) from Sofia. It covers an area of 19.928 square kilometres and as of 2007 had a population of 1713 people.

== Landmarks ==
Byal Izvor is situated near several historical and natural features. Approximately 8 kilometers northwest, in the Karaburun area, traces of an ancient Thracian sanctuary and fortress have been discovered. The sanctuary, used from the 5th to 4th centuries BC, includes a rock with around 90 trapezoidal niches. These niches were used for placing pottery and tiles related to burial practices.

About 500 meters from this sanctuary, the Kaleto fortress remains visible. The fortress is circular, with a diameter of 67 meters and an area of 0.5 acres, constructed from stones without mortar.

Further north, around 20 kilometers from Byal Izvor, is the Devil's Bridge over the Arda River. Built in the 16th century BC, it replaced a Roman bridge that was part of an ancient route linking the Aegean Sea with the Thracian lowland. The site was designated as a landmark in 2003.

The Alada peak, standing at 1241 meters, is the highest point in the Eastern Rhodopes. Nearby, the Momini Gardi peak also provides notable elevation in the region.
