= Stoyanovo =

Stoyanovo may refer to the following places in Bulgaria:

- Stoyanovo, Kardzhali Province
- Stoyanovo, Montana Province
