= Brezen =

Brezen may refer to:

- Pretzel
- Brezen, Kardzhali Province, Bulgaria
- Brezen, Vitanje, a village in the Municipality of Vitanje, northeastern Slovenia
