= Tarnoslivka =

- Village
- Location within Bulgaria
- Coordinates: 41.583°N 25.1°E
- Country: Bulgaria
- Province: Kardzhali Province
- Municipality: Ardino

Area
  - Total: 7.929 km^{2} (3.061 sq mi)

Population (2013)
  - Total: 118
- Time zone: UTC+2 (EET)
  - Summer (DST): UTC+3 (EEST)

Tarnoslivka (Bulgarian: Търносливка) is a village in Ardino Municipality, Kardzhali Province, southern-central Bulgaria. It is located 191.237 kilometres (118.829 mi) from Sofia. It covers an area of 7.929 square kilometres and as of 2013 had a population of 118 people.

== Landmarks ==
Momini Gardi Peak is positioned close to the village. Alada Peak, at 1241 meters, stands as the tallest peak in the Eastern Rhodopes and is another notable high point in the region.

Approximately 26 kilometers to the north lies the Devil's Bridge over the River Arda. This 16th century bridge was constructed where a Roman bridge once stood. The Roman bridge was part of an ancient route linking the Aegean Sea and the Thracian lowlands. The site received landmark status in 2003.

Roughly 12 kilometers west of Tarnoslivka, in the Karaburun region, remnants of an ancient Thracian sanctuary and fortress have been uncovered. This site offers views of much of the Central and Eastern Rhodopes and dates from the 4th and 6th centuries BC. It includes a large rock with about 90 trapezoidal niches, which were used for placing pottery and tiles related to funerary practices.

Nearby, about 500 meters from the sanctuary, stands the Kaleto Fortress in the Eagle Rocks area. This fortress, among the largest in the Rhodopes, is built from stone without mortar and has an irregular circular shape with a diameter of 67 meters and a 0.5-acre area.
