= Brezen, Kardzhali Province =

Brezen
- Village
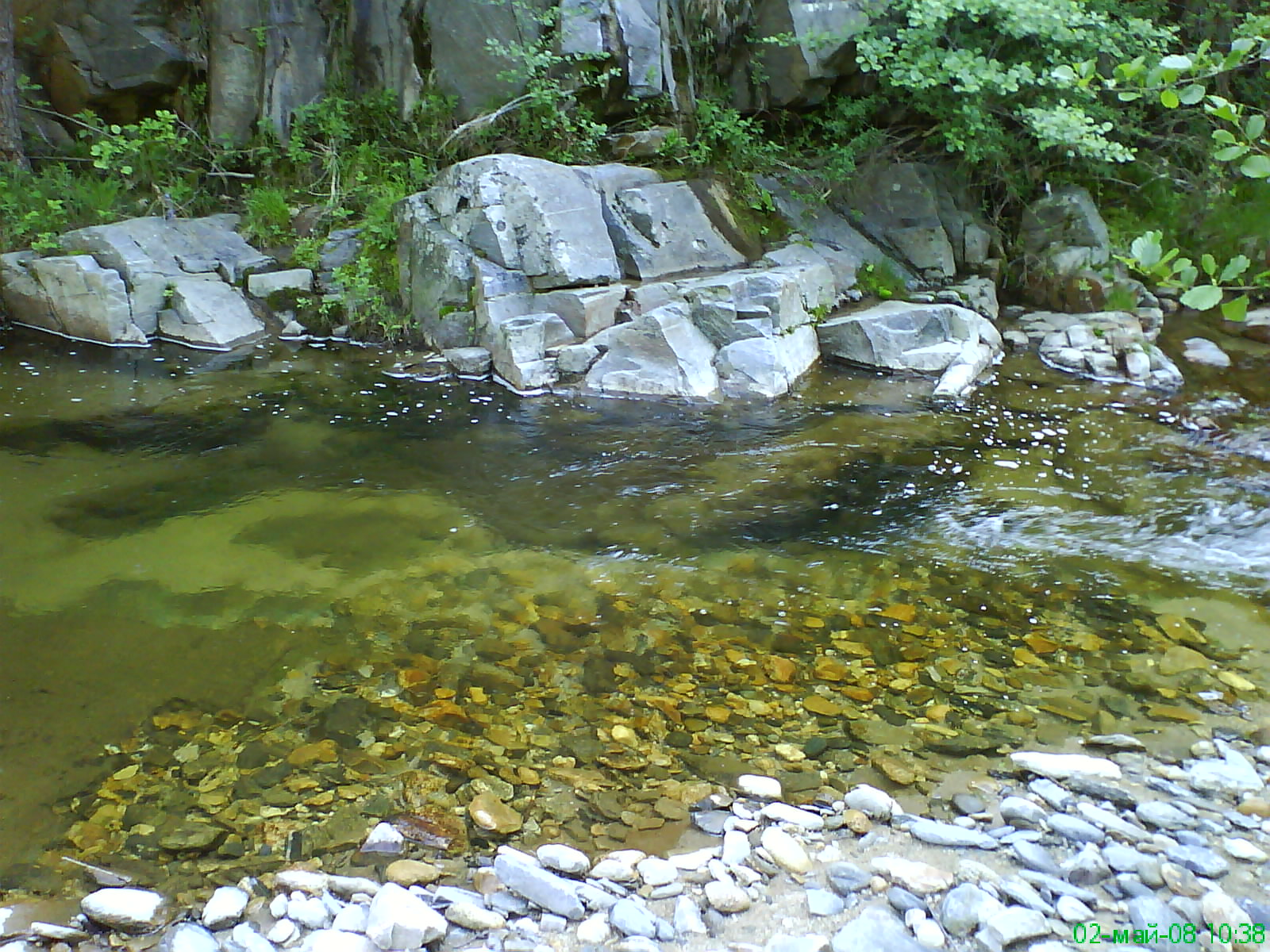
- at Berzen, Kardzhali

- Location within Bulgaria
- Coordinates: 41.667°N 25.217°E
- Country: Bulgaria
- Province: Kardzhali Province
- Municipality: Ardino

Area
  - Total: 7.21 km^{2} (2.78 sq mi)

Population (2007)
  - Total: 243
- Time zone: UTC+2 (EET)
  - Summer (DST): UTC+3 (EEST)

Brezen (Bulgarian: Брезен) is a village in Ardino Municipality, Kardzhali Province, southern-central Bulgaria. It is located 193.057 kilometres (119.960 mi) from Sofia. It covers an area of 7.21 square kilometres and as of 2007 had a population of 243 people.

== Landmarks ==
Located 42 kilometers northeast of Brezen, Perperikon is an archaeological site featuring a large ancient sanctuary, various historical monuments, and remnants of a medieval fortress. It is recognized as one of the 100 National Tourist Sites.

About 30 kilometers southwest of Brezen, the Devil's Bridge crosses a scenic gorge over the Arda River. This structure dates back to the late Middle Ages.

Near Bashevo, roughly 13 kilometers northwest of Brezen, you can find the Krivus Fortress. This medieval fortification, constructed in the 10th century, was intended to safeguard the region around the Arda River within the eastern Rhodope Mountains.

Brezen itself is situated around 10 kilometers from Kardzhali Dam. The dam is a location where visitors engage in activities like yachting, surfing, and swimming. It is also a spot for fishing, with a range of fish such as brook trout, sturgeon, carp, amour, chub, and perch found there.
