= Star chitak =

- Village
- Location within Bulgaria
- Coordinates: 41.667°N 25.217°E
- Country: Bulgaria
- Province: Kardzhali Province
- Municipality: Ardino

Area
  - Total: 1.505 km^{2} (0.581 sq mi)

Population (2013)
  - Total: 25
- Time zone: UTC+2 (EET)
  - Summer (DST): UTC+3 (EEST)

Star chitak (Bulgarian: Стар читак) is a village in Ardino Municipality, Kardzhali Province, southern-central Bulgaria. It is located 193.057 kilometres (119.960 mi) southeast of Sofia. It covers an area of 1.505 square kilometres and as of 2013 it had a population of 25 people. The Inhabitants once was Çıtak Turks (Čitaci). Evliya Çelebi described the Çıtak Turks (Chitak), in his Seyahatname as "a mixture of various peoples such as Bulgarian-Greek-Tatar-Moldovan" and even gave examples from their language, some of them, went at the 1877-1878 Ottoman-Russian War, Balkan wars 1912-1913 and after the WW1 1914-1915 wars immigrated to Anatolia used to live in Ankara, others to Tekirdağ and Çanakkale provinces.
