= Sedlartsi =

- Village
- Location within Bulgaria
- Coordinates: 41.53333°N 25.03333°E
- Country: Bulgaria
- Province: Kardzhali Province
- Municipality: Ardino

Area
  - Total: 1.837 km^{2} (0.709 sq mi)

Population (2007)
  - Total: 118
- Time zone: UTC+2 (EET)
  - Summer (DST): UTC+3 (EEST)

Sedlartsi (Bulgarian: Седларци) is a village in Ardino Municipality, Kardzhali Province, southern-central Bulgaria. It is located 190.742 kilometres (118.522 mi) southeast of Sofia. It covers an area of 1.837 square kilometres and as of 2007 it had a population of 118 people.
