= Pesnopoy =

- Village
- Location within Bulgaria
- Coordinates: 41.683°N 25.117°E
- Country: Bulgaria
- Province: Kardzhali Province
- Municipality: Ardino

Area
  - Total: 24.46 km^{2} (9.44 sq mi)

Population (2007)
  - Total: 10
  - Density: 0.41/km^{2} (1.1/sq mi)
- Time zone: UTC+2 (EET)
  - Summer (DST): UTC+3 (EEST)

Pesnopoy (Bulgarian: Песнопой) is a village in Ardino Municipality, Kardzhali Province, southern-central Bulgaria. It is located 185.351 kilometres (115.172 mi) southeast of Sofia. It covers an area of 24.464 square kilometres and as of 2007 it had a population of 10 people.
