= Iskra, Kardzhali Province =

Iskra
- Village
- Location within Bulgaria
- Coordinates: 41.617°N 25.15°E
- Country: Bulgaria
- Province: Kardzhali Province
- Municipality: Ardino

Area
  - Total: 1.884 km^{2} (0.727 sq mi)

Population (2007)
  - Total: 65
- Time zone: UTC+2 (EET)
  - Summer (DST): UTC+3 (EEST)

Iskra (Bulgarian: Искра) is a village in Ardino Municipality, Kardzhali Province, southern-central Bulgaria. It is located 192.036 kilometres (119.326 mi) southeast of Sofia. It covers an area of 1.884 square kilometres and as of 2007 it had a population of 65 people.
