= Kroyachevo =

- Village
- Location within Bulgaria
- Coordinates: 41.583°N 25.133°E
- Country: Bulgaria
- Province: Kardzhali Province
- Municipality: Ardino

Area
  - Total: 5.183 km^{2} (2.001 sq mi)

Population (2007)
  - Total: 104
- Time zone: UTC+2 (EET)
  - Summer (DST): UTC+3 (EEST)

Kroyachevo (Bulgarian: Кроячево) is a village in Ardino Municipality, Kardzhali Province, southern-central Bulgaria. It is located 193.336 kilometres (120.133 mi) southeast of Sofia. It covers an area of 5.183 square kilometres and as of 2007 it had a population of 104 people.
