= Golobrad =

- Village
- Location within Bulgaria
- Coordinates: 41.667°N 25.217°E
- Country: Bulgaria
- Province: Kardzhali Province
- Municipality: Ardino

Area
  - Total: 3.547 km^{2} (1.370 sq mi)

Population (2007)
  - Total: 151
- Time zone: UTC+2 (EET)
  - Summer (DST): UTC+3 (EEST)

Golobrad (Bulgarian: Голобрад) is a village in Ardino Municipality, Kardzhali Province, southern-central Bulgaria. It is located 193.057 kilometres (119.960 mi) from Sofia. It covers an area of 3.547 square kilometres and as of 2007 had a population of 151 people.
