= Chervena skala =

Coordinates: 41°36′N 25°11′E

- Village
- Interactive map of Chervena skala
- Country: Bulgaria
- Province: Kardzhali Province
- Municipality: Ardino

Area
  - Total: 2.195 km^{2} (0.847 sq mi)

Population (2007)
  - Total: 87
- Time zone: UTC+2 (EET)
  - Summer (DST): UTC+3 (EEST)

Chervena skala (Bulgarian: Червена скала) is a village in Ardino Municipality, Kardzhali Province, southern-central Bulgaria. It covers an area of 2.195 square kilometres and as of 2007 had a population of 87 people.
