= Srunsko =

- Village
- Location within Bulgaria
- Coordinates: 41.533°N 25.1°E
- Country: Bulgaria
- Province: Kardzhali Province
- Municipality: Ardino

Area
  - Total: 5.897 km^{2} (2.277 sq mi)

Population (2013)
  - Total: 75
- Time zone: UTC+2 (EET)
  - Summer (DST): UTC+3 (EEST)

Srunsko (Bulgarian: Срънско) is a village in Ardino Municipality, Kardzhali Province, southern-central Bulgaria. It is located 194.882 kilometres (121.094 mi) southeast of Sofia. It covers an area of 5.897 square kilometres and as of 2013 it had a population of 75 people.
