= Rodopsko =

- Village
- Location within Bulgaria
- Coordinates: 41.583°N 25.117°E
- Country: Bulgaria
- Province: Kardzhali Province
- Municipality: Ardino

Area
  - Total: 3.014 km^{2} (1.164 sq mi)

Population (2007)
  - Total: 37
- Time zone: UTC+2 (EET)
  - Summer (DST): UTC+3 (EEST)

Rodopsko (Bulgarian: Родопско) is a village in Ardino Municipality, Kardzhali Province, southern-central Bulgaria. It is located 192.316 kilometres (119.500 mi) southeast of Sofia. It covers an area of 3.014 square kilometres and as of 2007 it had a population of 37 people.
