= Ribartsi =

- Village
- Location within Bulgaria
- Coordinates: 41.66667°N 25.25°E
- Country: Bulgaria
- Province: Kardzhali Province
- Municipality: Ardino

Area
  - Total: 1.997 km^{2} (0.771 sq mi)

Population (2007)
  - Total: 44
- Time zone: UTC+2 (EET)
  - Summer (DST): UTC+3 (EEST)

Ribartsi (Bulgarian: Рибарци) is a village in Ardino Municipality, Kardzhali Province, southern-central Bulgaria. It is located 195.29 kilometres (121.35 mi) southeast of Sofia. It covers an area of 1.997 square kilometres and as of 2007 it had a population of 44 people.
