= Bistrogled =

- Village
- Location within Bulgaria
- Coordinates: 41.567°N 25.133°E
- Country: Bulgaria
- Province: Kardzhali Province
- Municipality: Ardino

Area
  - Total: 2.602 km^{2} (1.005 sq mi)

Population (2007)
  - Total: 34
- Time zone: UTC+2 (EET)
  - Summer (DST): UTC+3 (EEST)

Bistrogled (Bulgarian: Бистроглед) is a village in Ardino Municipality, Kardzhali Province, southern-central Bulgaria. It is located 194.481 kilometres (120.845 mi) from Sofia. It covers an area of 2.602 square kilometres and as of 2007 had a population of 34 people.
