= Belite Brezi =

Resort area in Ardino, Bulgaria

Belite Brezi Белите брези
- Resort area
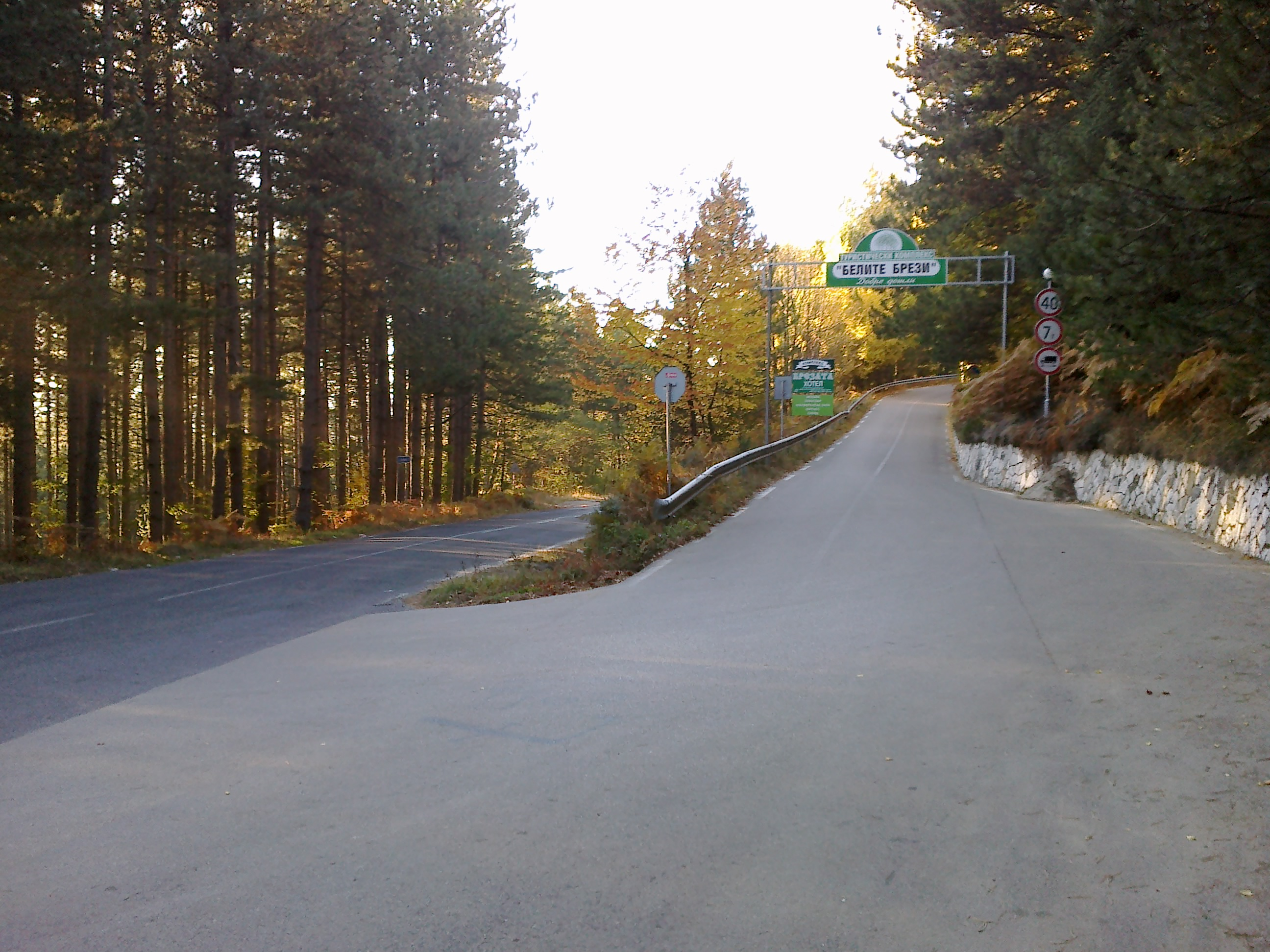

- Location of Belite Brezi
- Coordinates: 41°34′48″N 25°9′27″E
- Country: Bulgaria
- Province (Oblast): Kardzhali

Belite Brezi (Bulgarian: Белите Брези or Бели Брези:Beli Brezi, meaning The Silver Birches) is a resort area in the Rhodope Mountains of southern Bulgaria. The reserve is located 30 km (19 mi) from the town of Kardzhali and 6 km (3.7 mi) from the town of Ardino. This is one of the places with the most developed tourism in the area. On its territory there is a holiday house with a total capacity of about 250 beds. The area was created to protect the only naturally growing forest of silver birch (Betula pendula) in the Rhodopes. Natural silver birch forests are rare in Bulgaria and the main areas covered in this species are artificially planted. Belite Brezi has an area of about 3680 decares. Other tree species in the forest include European beech (Fagus sylvatica), Scots pine (Pinus sylvestris), Austrian pine (Pinus nigra), Norway spruce (Picea abies) and others, but they are under-represented.
