= Chernigovo =

- Village
- Location within Bulgaria
- Coordinates: 41.683°N 25.167°E
- Country: Bulgaria
- Province: Kardzhali Province
- Municipality: Ardino

Area
  - Total: 1.384 km^{2} (0.534 sq mi)

Population (2013)
  - Total: 69
- Time zone: UTC+2 (EET)
  - Summer (DST): UTC+3 (EEST)

Chernigovo (Bulgarian: Чернигово) is a village in Ardino Municipality, Kardzhali Province, southern-central Bulgaria. It is located 188.663 kilometres (117.230 mi) from Sofia. It covers an area of 1.384 square kilometres and as of 2013 had a population of 69 people.
