= Tarna, Kardzhali Province =

Tarna
- Village
- Location within Bulgaria
- Coordinates: 41°39′57″N 25°10′25″E
- Country: Bulgaria
- Province: Kardzhali Province
- Municipality: Ardino

Area
  - Total: 2.458 km^{2} (0.949 sq mi)

Population (2013)
  - Total: 42
- Time zone: UTC+2 (EET)
  - Summer (DST): UTC+3 (EEST)

Tarna (Bulgarian: Търна) is a village in Ardino Municipality, Kardzhali Province, southern-central Bulgaria. It covers an area of 2.458 square kilometres and as of 2013 had a population of 42 people.
