= Lyubino =

- Village
- Location within Bulgaria
- Coordinates: 41.667°N 25.117°E
- Country: Bulgaria
- Province: Kardzhali Province
- Municipality: Ardino

Area
  - Total: 10.823 km^{2} (4.179 sq mi)

Population (2007)
  - Total: 22
- Time zone: UTC+2 (EET)
  - Summer (DST): UTC+3 (EEST)

Lyubino (Bulgarian: Любино) is a village in Ardino Municipality, Kardzhali Province, southern-central Bulgaria. It is located 186.438 kilometres (115.847 mi) southeast of Sofia. It covers an area of 10.823 square kilometres and as of 2007 it had a population of 22 people.
