= Musevo =

Musevo Мусево
- Village
- Location within Kardzhali Province Location within Bulgaria
- Coordinates: 41.567°N 25.033°E
- Country: Bulgaria
- Province: Kardzhali Province
- Municipality: Ardino

Area
  - Total: 4.309 km^{2} (1.664 sq mi)

Population (2007)
  - Total: 56
  - Density: 13/km^{2} (34/sq mi)
- Time zone: UTC+2 (EET)
  - Summer (DST): UTC+3 (EEST)

Musevo (Bulgarian: Мусево) is a village in Ardino Municipality, Kardzhali Province, southern-central Bulgaria. It is located 188.205 kilometres (116.945 mi) southeast of Sofia. It covers an area of 4.309 square kilometres and as of 2007 it had a population of 56 people.
