= Temenuga =

- Village
- Location within Bulgaria
- Coordinates: 41.517°N 25.167°E
- Country: Bulgaria
- Province: Kardzhali Province
- Municipality: Ardino

Area
  - Total: 7.217 km^{2} (2.786 sq mi)

Population (2013)
  - Total: 10
- Time zone: UTC+2 (EET)
  - Summer (DST): UTC+3 (EEST)

Temenuga (Bulgarian: Теменуга) is a village in Ardino Municipality, Kardzhali Province, southern-central Bulgaria. It is located 200.247 kilometres (124.428 mi) southeast of Sofia. It covers an area of 7.217 square kilometres and as of 2013 it had a population of 10 people.
