= Ageli =

Settlement in the Xanthi regional unit of Greece

Coordinates: 41.107°N 24.806°E

Ageli (Greek: Αγέλη) is a settlement in the Xanthi regional unit of Greece. It is located northeast of Toxotes and is approximately 14 kilometers from Xanthi. It had 37 residents, according to the 1971 census.
