= Doyrantsi =

- Hamlet
- Location within Bulgaria
- Coordinates: 41.71667°N 25.21667°E
- Country: Bulgaria
- Province: Kardzhali Province
- Municipality: Ardino

Area
  - Total: 10.426 km^{2} (4.026 sq mi)

Population (2015)
  - Total: 2
- Time zone: UTC+2 (EET)
  - Summer (DST): UTC+3 (EEST)

Doyrantsi (Bulgarian: Дойранци) is a small hamlet in Ardino Municipality, Kardzhali Province, southern-central Bulgaria. It is located 189.806 kilometres (117.940 mi) from Sofia. It covers an area of 10.426 square kilometres and as of 2007 had a population of 2 people.
