= Sinchets =

- Village
- Location within Bulgaria
- Coordinates: 41.55°N 25.2°E
- Country: Bulgaria
- Province: Kardzhali Province
- Municipality: Ardino

Area
  - Total: 8.602 km^{2} (3.321 sq mi)
- Elevation: 770 m (2,530 ft)

Population (2007)
  - Total: 70
- Time zone: UTC+2 (EET)
  - Summer (DST): UTC+3 (EEST)

Sinchets (Bulgarian: Синчец) is a small mountain village in Ardino Municipality, Kardzhali Province, southern-central Bulgaria. It is located 199.967 kilometres (124.254 mi) from Sofia. It lies at altitude of 770 metres (2,530 ft), 9.8 kilometres (6.1 mi) by winding road to the southeast of Ardino, and north of Tsarkvitsa. It covers an area of 8.602 square kilometres and as of 2007 had a population of 70 people.
