= Dyavolski most =

Dyavolski most Дяволски мост
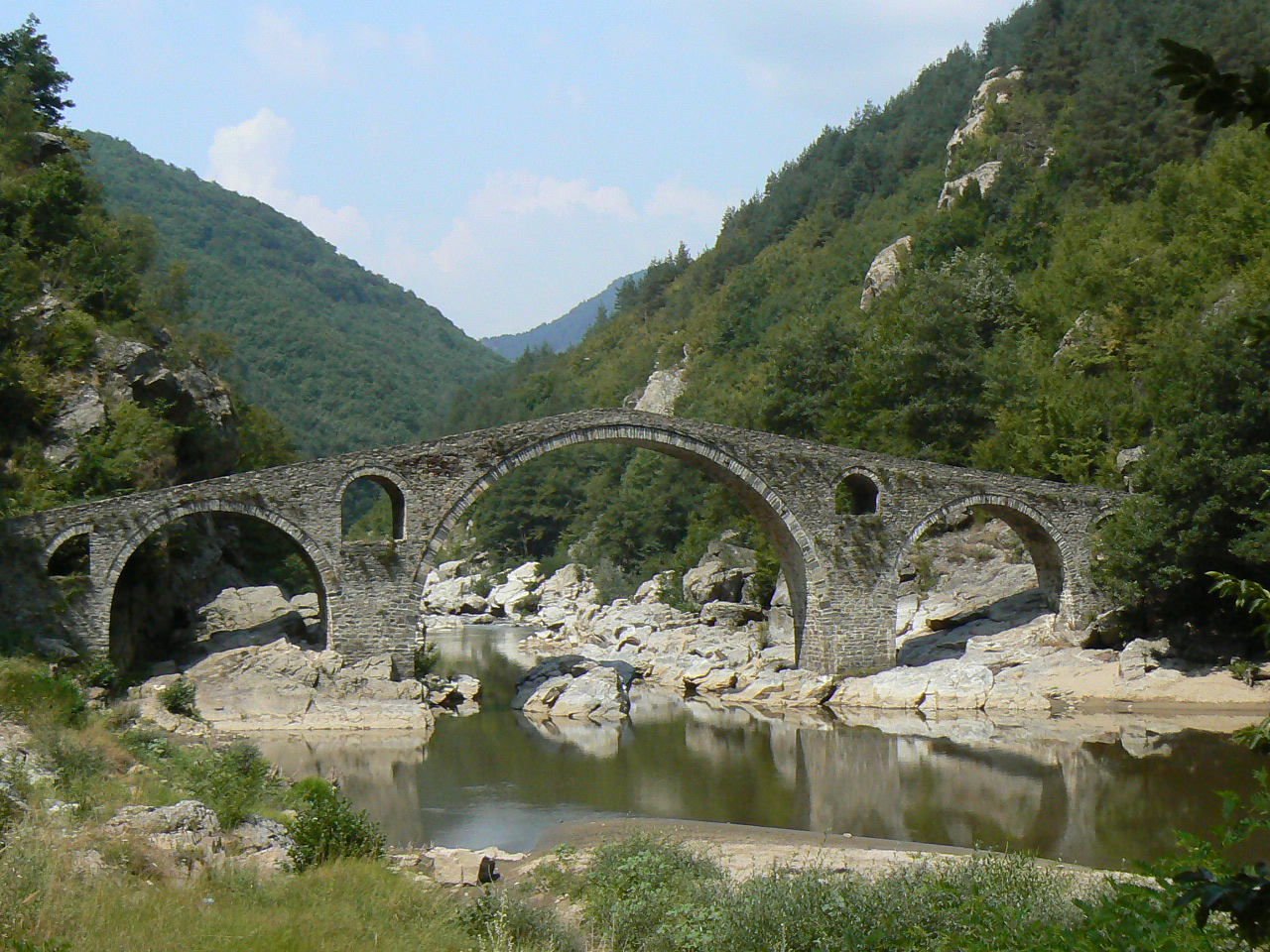
- Devil's Bridge near Ardino, Bulgaria
- Coordinates: 41°37′14″N 25°06′51″E
- Carries: pedestrians
- Crosses: Arda River
- Locale: close to Ardino, Bulgaria

Characteristics
- Design: arch bridge
- Total length: 56 metres (184 ft)
- Width: 3.5 metres (11 ft)
- Longest span: 13 metres (43 ft)
- Clearance below: 11.50 metres (37.7 ft)

History
- Construction start: 1515
- Construction end: 1518
- Opened: uncertain

Location
- Interactive map of Dyavolski most

The Dyavolski most (Bulgarian: Дяволски мост, lit. 'Devil's Bridge'; Turkish: Şeytan Köprüsü) is an arch bridge over the Arda River in a narrow gorge in southern-central Bulgaria. It is 10 km (6.2 mi) from the Bulgarian town of Ardino in the Rhodope Mountains and is part of the ancient road connecting the lowlands of Thrace with the north Aegean Sea coast.

Dyavolski most was rebuilt between 1515 and 1518 by the Bulgarian Master Dimitar. Legend has it that the bridge was built by the Romans to link the Aegean Sea and the region of Thrace in Bulgaria. The bridge, the largest and best known of its kind in the Rhodopes, is 56 m (183.7 ft) long and has three arches, but also features holes with small semicircular arches for reading the water level. The Dyavolski most is 3.5 m (11.5 ft) wide and its main arch is 11.50 m (37.7 ft) high. A stone parapet, 12 cm (4.7 in) tall, is preserved on the sides, and breakwaters are placed opposite the stream.

As an international long-distance hiking trail the Sultans Trail passes the bridge from Ardino to Kardzhali.

The bridge was proclaimed a monument of culture on 24 February 1984.

== Gallery ==
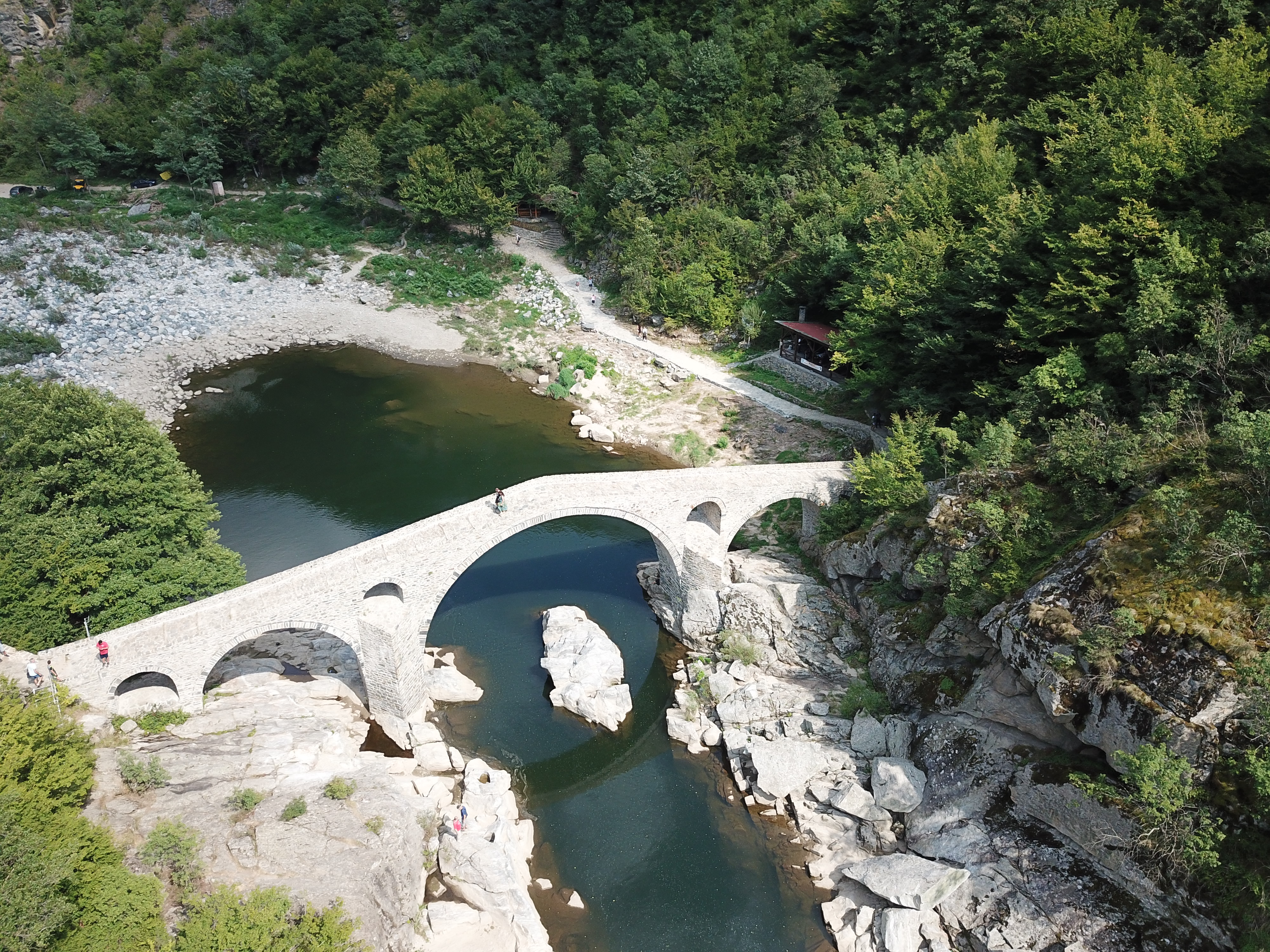
Devil's Bridge

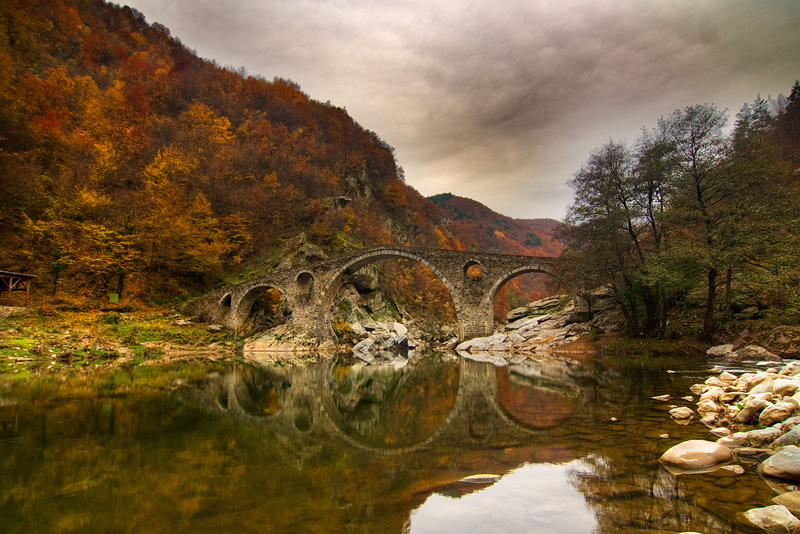
Dyavolski most in autumn

== See also ==
- Devil's Bridge
