= Stoyanovo, Kardzhali Province =

Stoyanovo
- Village
- Location within Bulgaria
- Coordinates: 41.583°N 25.033°E
- Country: Bulgaria
- Province: Kardzhali Province
- Municipality: Ardino

Area
  - Total: 5.974 km^{2} (2.307 sq mi)

Population (2013)
  - Total: 21
- Time zone: UTC+2 (EET)
  - Summer (DST): UTC+3 (EEST)

Stoyanovo (Bulgarian: Стояново) is a village in Ardino Municipality, Kardzhali Province, southern-central Bulgaria. It is located 187.023 kilometres (116.211 mi) southeast of Sofia. It covers an area of 5.974 square kilometres and as of 2013 it had a population of 21 people.
