= Dedino, Kardzhali Province =

Dedino
- Village
- Location in Bulgaria
- Coordinates: 41°39′41″N 25°11′9″E
- Country: Bulgaria
- Province: Kardzhali Province
- Municipality: Ardino

Area
  - Total: 0.969 km^{2} (0.374 sq mi)

Population (2007)
  - Total: 52
- Time zone: UTC+2 (EET)
  - Summer (DST): UTC+3 (EEST)

Dedino (Bulgarian: Дедино) is a village in Ardino Municipality, Kardzhali Province, southern-central Bulgaria. It covers an area of 0.969 square kilometres and as of 2007 had a population of 52 people.
