= Zhaltusha =

- Village
- Location within Bulgaria
- Coordinates: 41.53333°N 25.05°E
- Country: Bulgaria
- Province: Kardzhali Province
- Municipality: Ardino

Area
  - Total: 6.452 km^{2} (2.491 sq mi)

Population (2013)
  - Total: 925
- Time zone: UTC+2 (EET)
  - Summer (DST): UTC+3 (EEST)

Zhaltusha (Bulgarian: Жълтуша) is a village in Ardino Municipality, Kardzhali Province, southern-central Bulgaria. It is located 191.765 kilometres (119.157 mi) southeast of Sofia. It covers an area of 6.452 square kilometres and as of 2013 had a population of 926 people.
