= Borovitsa, Kardzhali Province =

Borovitsa Боровица
- Village
- Location within Bulgaria
- Coordinates: 41.68333°N 25.25°E
- Country: Bulgaria
- Province: Kardzhali Province
- Municipality: Ardino

Area
  - Total: 12.667 km^{2} (4.891 sq mi)

Population (2013)
  - Total: 241
- Time zone: UTC+2 (EET)
  - Summer (DST): UTC+3 (EEST)

Borovitsa (Bulgarian: Боровица) is a village in Ardino Municipality, Kardzhali Province, southern-central Bulgaria. It is located 194.207 kilometres (120.675 mi) from Sofia. It covers an area of 12.667 square kilometres and as of 2013 had a population of 241 people.
