= Patmos Fortress =

Medieval stronghold

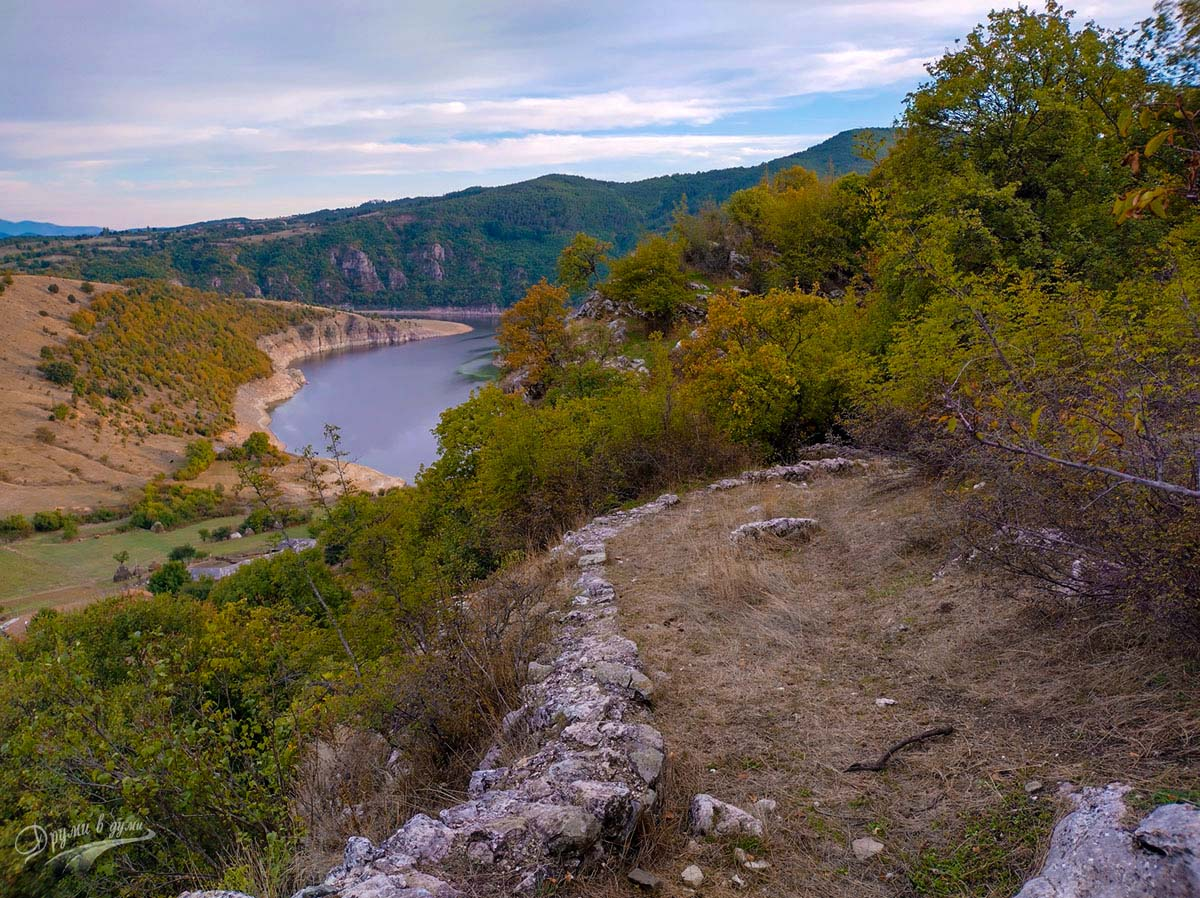
- Ruins of the walls of Patmos

- Location within Bulgaria

General information
- Architectural style: Fortress
- Location: Borovitsa, Bulgaria
- Coordinates: 41°40′55″N 25°13′50″E
- Construction started: 5th–14th century

Patmos (Bulgarian: Патмос) is a medieval fortress in the Rhodope Mountains of southern Bulgaria rising over a promontory near the confluence of the rivers Arda and Borovitsa. A few kilometers to the west upstream the valley of the Arda are located the ruins of the fortress of Krivus.

== Location ==
Patmos is located on a hill over the mouth of the river Borovitsa and left bank of the Arda at the westernmost end of the modern Kardzhali Reservoir. The nearest villages are Borovitsa to the south and Doyrantsi to the north, belonging to the Ardino Municipality of Kardzhali Province. The hill dominates the surrounding lands providing visibility in all directions. Its slopes are vertical from the east and the south and steep from the west. The easiest access is from the north. The fortress is on a state-owned land and was declared a site of national importance is 1968.

== Description ==
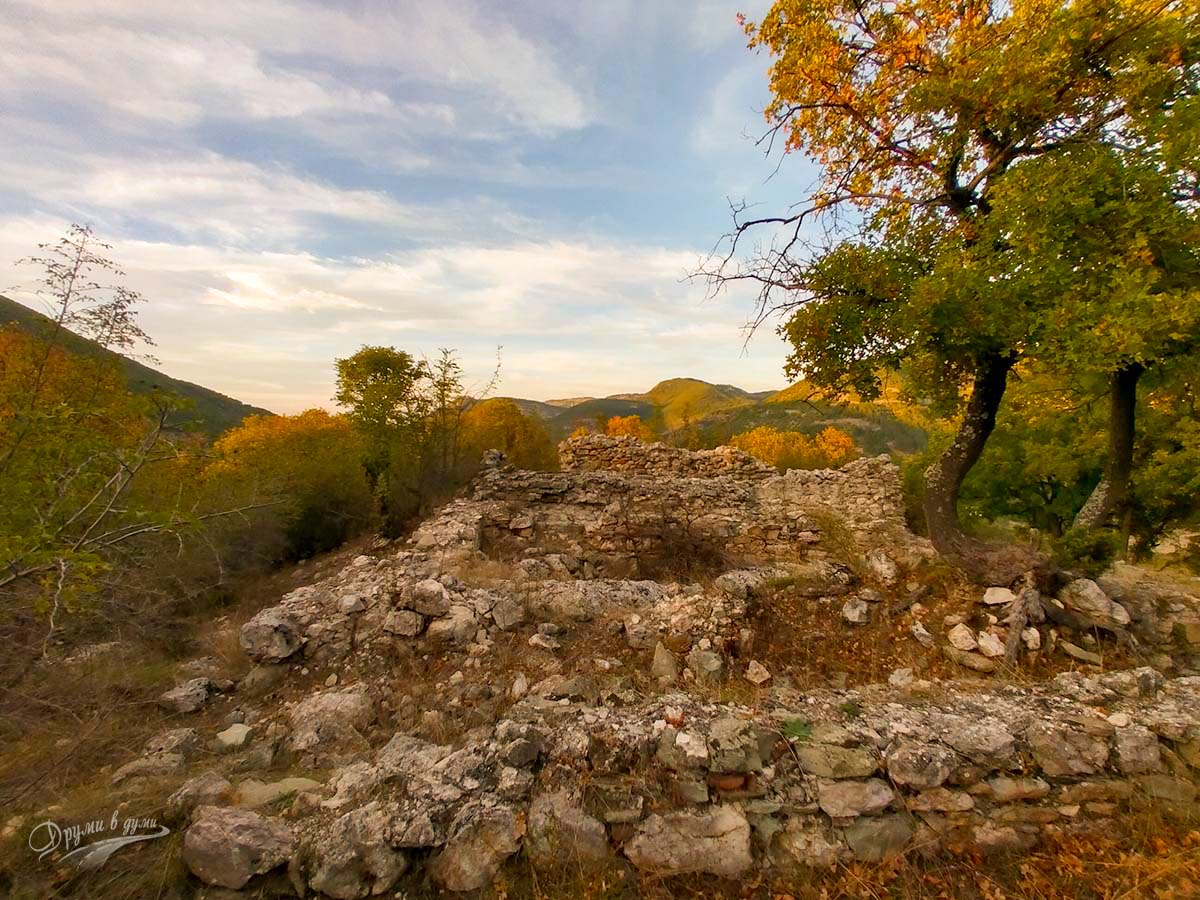
Ruins of Patmos Fortress

Patmos consists of a citadel situated in the southernmost part of the hill, a suburb occupying the northern part of the elevation below the citadel, and another suburb on the western area below the hill. The entire complex and the adjacent suburbs span a territory of 100,000 m^{2}. The citadel of Patmos measures about 115 m in direction north–south and a maximum width of 65 m in direction east–west. It has irregular shape, with the defensive walls following the configuration of the terrain, enclosing an area of about 6,300 m^{2}. The walls enclose the hill from the west and north. It is built of treated stone, joined with white mortar.

The more easily accessible north wall is 1.25 m thick and is reinforced by two towers. The northeast tower is trapezoidal with external dimensions of 5.05x4.22x4.6 m and wall thickness of 0.85 m. It was accessible through an entrance with a width of 1.3 m, which was later walled up. The northwest tower of Patmos is an irregular horseshoe shape. It protrudes in front of the outer side of the wall at a distance of 3.9 m, and the thickness of its walls is 1.3 m. There is a square room in its interior, accessed through an entrance. The distance between the two towers is 12.7 m. After the northwest tower, the walls turn south, forming an arc that runs continuously until reaching the vertical sheer cliffs facing the river Arda to the south.

Within the citadel are the ruins of a large, three-nave, three-apsed church without a vestibule and with a length of 13 m and a width 11.5 m. It is built of treated stones, joined with white mortar. Its walls are partially located on the rock foundation of the hill and have a thickness of 0.75 m. The three naves of the church had separate entrances from the west, with a width of 1.35 m on the central nave and 1.15 m on the side ones. The floor of the building is the leveled rock foundation, partially covered with stone slabs. It was constructed in the 5th century with subsequent reconstructions in the 9th and the 12–14th centuries. The foundation of the church is assumed to the connected with the mission of Nicetas of Remesiana to spread Christianity among the local population.

North of the church are the remains of a rectangular building with a length of 10.8 m and a width 4 m, built of rubble stone and joined with white mortar.
