= Dyadovtsi =

- Village
- Location within Bulgaria
- Coordinates: 41.61666°N 25.15°E
- Country: Bulgaria
- Province: Kardzhali Province
- Municipality: Ardino

Area
  - Total: 6.025 km^{2} (2.326 sq mi)

Population (2007)
  - Total: 85
- Time zone: UTC+2 (EET)
  - Summer (DST): UTC+3 (EEST)

Dyadovtsi (Bulgarian: Дядовци) is a village in Ardino Municipality, Kardzhali Province, southern-central Bulgaria. It is located 192.06 kilometres (119.34 mi) from Sofia. It covers an area of 6.025 square kilometres and as of 2007 had a population of 85 people.
