= Krivus =

Medieval stronghold

Krivus Fortress
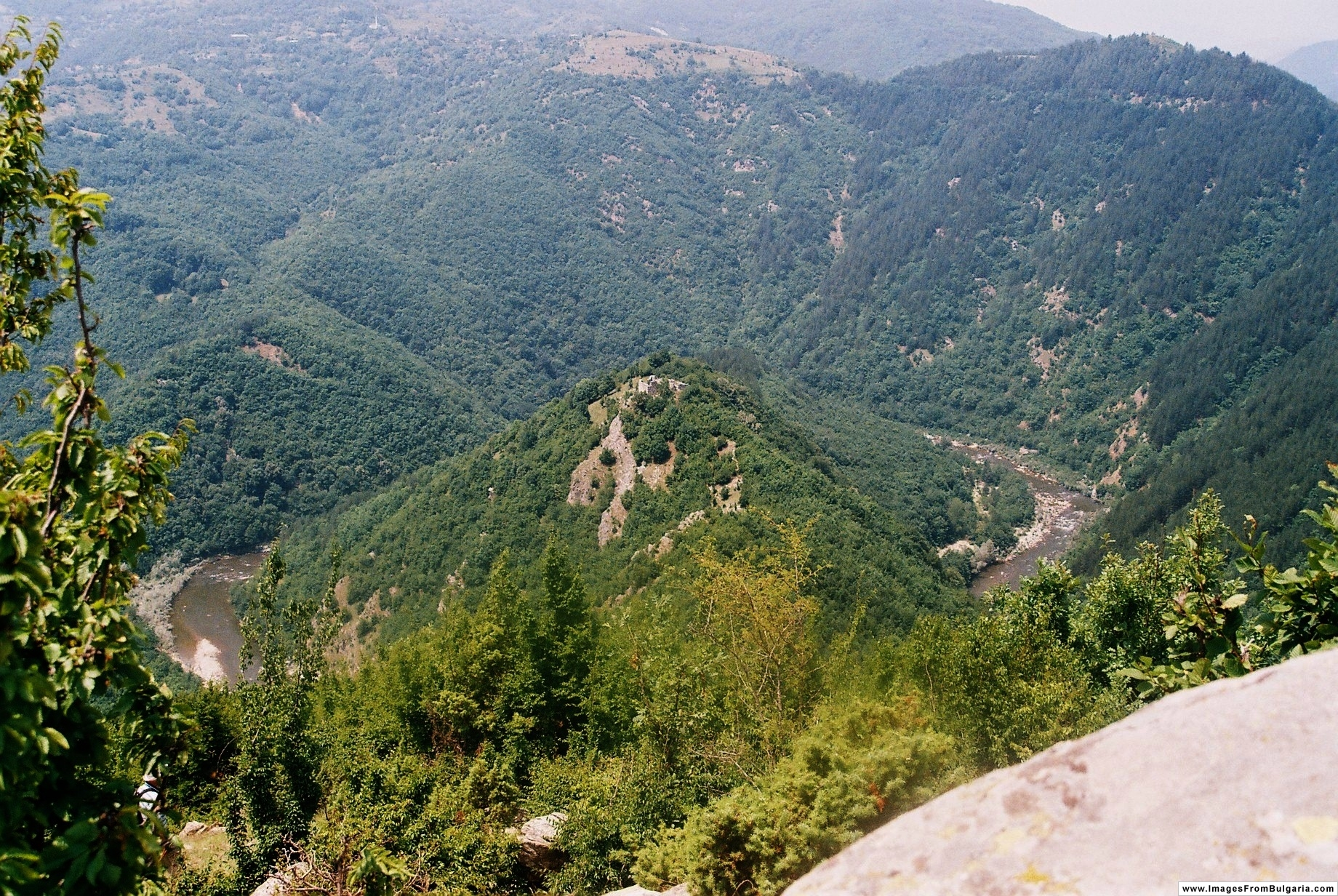
- A view to Krivus

- Location within Bulgaria

General information
- Architectural style: Fortress
- Location: Bashevo, Bulgaria
- Coordinates: 41°40′6.07″N 25°8′7″E
- Construction started: 10th century

Krivus (Bulgarian: Кривус) is a medieval fortress in the Rhodope Mountains of southern Bulgaria rising over a high hill on the meanders of the river Arda. Constructed in the 10th century, the fortress was controlled by the Byzantine and the Bulgarian Empires until the region was conquered by the Ottoman Turks in the second half of the 14th century. Several kilometers to the east downstream the valley of the Arda are located the ruins of the Patmos Fortress, while a few kilometers south upstream is Dyavolski most bridge.

== Location ==
Krivus lies some 2 km to the northwest of the village of Bashevo, belonging to the Ardino Municipality of Kardzhali Province. The fortress raises on a promontory with steep slopes on the right bank of the Arda, surrounded from the north, west and south by a meander of the river. It is accessible from the east via a steep path from Bashovo that takes about 40 minutes due to the difficult terrain. It has been declared a historical landmark of local importance.

== Description ==
The fortification is located on two rocky peaks on the hill with almost vertical rocky slopes to the north and very steep ones to the east, south and west. It rises 130–140 m above the riverbed. On the eastern, higher peak is located the citadel with an irregular shape with dimensions of 21x18 m and an area of 300 m^{2}. The citadel effectively blocks completely the access to the rest of the hill. The steep rocky slopes descending to the north and south of the citadel do not allow a would-be attacker to bypass it and strike a more unprotected part of the fortress. The entrance of Krivus is situated on the northeastern side of the citadel and is protected by a rectangular tower with dimensions of 5x4 m protruding 1.5 m from the walls. The tower walls are 1.2 m thick, constructed of rubble stone joined with white mortar.

In the southwestern part of the citadel was the entrance to the rest of the fortress with a width of 1.2 m and a height of 2.5 m. From the south are the remains of a small rectangular tower and to the north is a triangular tower, both situated in the inner yard of the citadel, protecting the entrance. The triangular town had residential quarters. The northern walls of the citadel are the most preserved, reaching a height of 5–6 m. There are the remains of a church.

The inner part of the fortress is formed by a wall that runs in a western direction following the configuration of the terrain, enclosing individual rock terraces. It is 1.75 m thick and encloses a highly fractured space with a length of 130 m and a maximum width of 24 m. Its northern section can be clearly traced, ending in the west with the remains a building raised above sheer cliffs, perhaps a tower. A small section of the western wall has been preserved. The southern wall in the inner part of the Krivus is not preserved and presumably fell down the slope, which is very steep in that section. There are remains of buildings in that inner section. The total area of the fortress enclosed by the citadel and the inner part is about 1,900 m^{2}. Krivus was got its water supply via an underground tunnel reached the river Arda below.

== History ==
Krivus was mentioned by the Byzantine chronicler George Akropolites. He records that in 1254, following the recent loss of the lands in the Rhodope Mountains to the Nicaean Empire, the Bulgarian emperor Michael II Asen led a successful campaign in the region. Akropolites wrote:

"He [Michael II Asen] descended from the Haemus and when he crossed the Evros, in a short time subjugated huge territory and took many towns without an effort. The populace, who were Bulgarians, took the side of their countrymen and shook the yoke of those who spoke another language. And the fortresses, left only with Roman [Byzantine] guards [...] were easily accessible to the Bulgarians. [...] The fortresses of Ustra, Perperek, Krivus and Efraim, located near Adrianople, surrendered to the Bulgarians."
