= Bashevo =

- Village
- Location within Bulgaria
- Coordinates: 41.667°N 25.133°E
- Country: Bulgaria
- Province: Kardzhali Province
- Municipality: Ardino

Area
  - Total: 4.647 km^{2} (1.794 sq mi)

Population (2013)
  - Total: 123
- Time zone: UTC+2 (EET)
  - Summer (DST): UTC+3 (EEST)

Bashevo (Bulgarian: Башево) is a village in Ardino Municipality, Kardzhali Province, southern-central Bulgaria. It is located 187.489 kilometres (116.500 mi) from Sofia. It covers an area of 4.647 square kilometres and as of 2013 had a population of 123 people. Some 2 km northwest of the village lie the ruins of the medieval Bulgarian fortress of Krivus.

Bashevo is situated at an elevation of 631 meters in a mountainous region. The village experiences a moderate Mediterranean climate, with mild, wet winters and hot, dry summers. The nearby Arda River is a significant feature for water management in the area. Bashevo has essential infrastructure, including water and electricity systems, and is connected by transport routes.

For educational and healthcare services, residents must travel to Ardino, where schools, medical practitioners, and other facilities are located. The village itself contains a town hall and a community center.
