= Belogradchik Fortress =

Castle in Bulgaria

- Белоградчишка крепост
- Belogradchik, Bulgaria
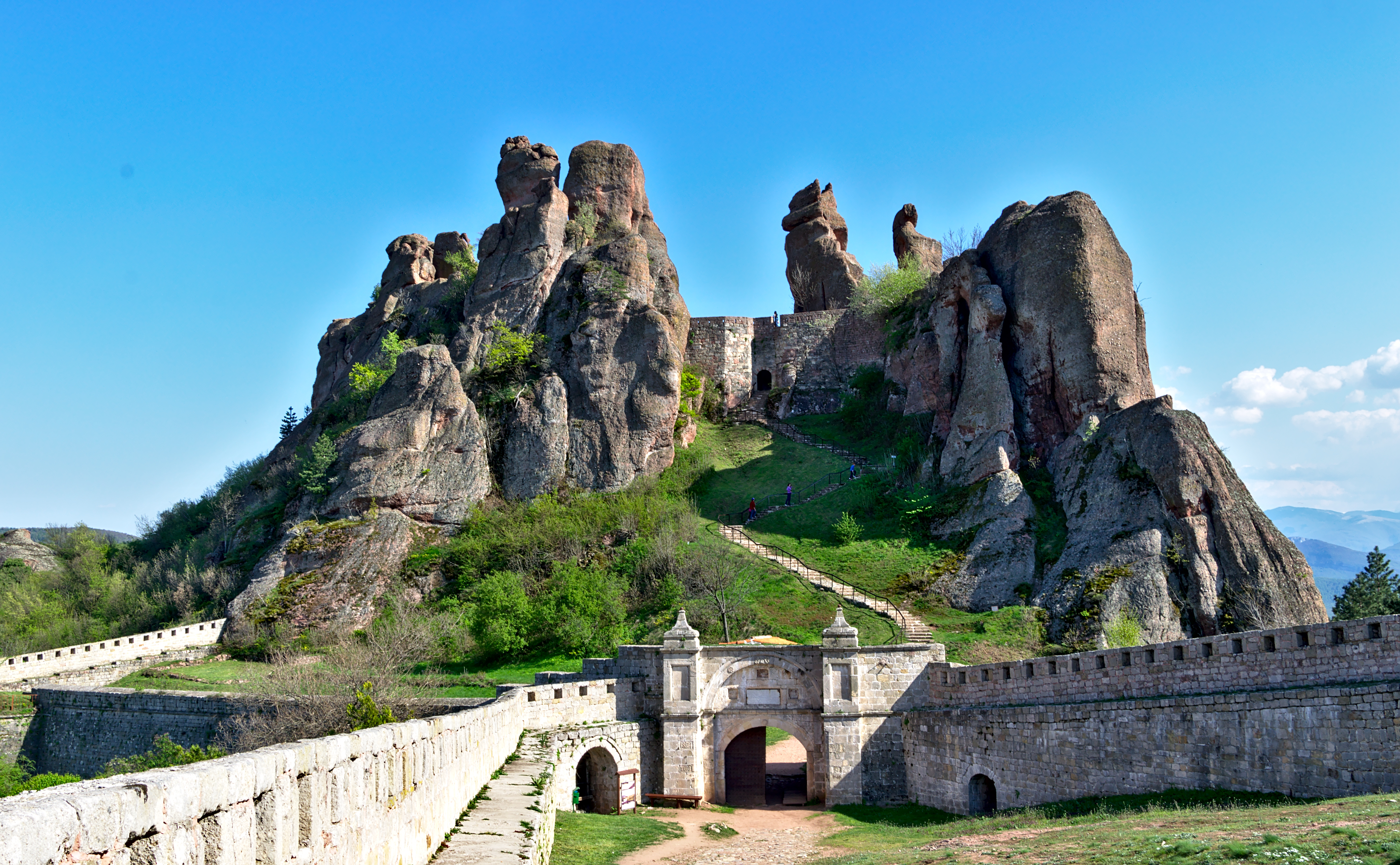
- The Belogradchik Fortress

Site information
- Condition: Reconstructed

Location
- Location of Belogradchik Fortress in Bulgaria
- Coordinates: 43°37′24″N 22°40′38″E

The Belogradchik Fortress (Bulgarian: Белоградчишка крепост, Belogradchishka krepost), also known as Kaleto (Калето, "the fortress" from Turkish kale), is an ancient fortress located on the north slopes of the Balkan Mountains (Old Mountain), close to the northwestern Bulgarian town of Belogradchik and is the town's primary cultural and historical tourist attraction, drawing, together with the Belogradchik Rocks, the main flow of tourists into the region. It is one of the best-preserved strongholds in Bulgaria and a cultural monument of national importance.

The fortress's walls are over 2 metres (6.6 ft) thick in the foundation and reaching up to 12 m (39 ft) in height. Three separate fortified yards exist that are connected with each other through gates. The fortress has a total area of 10,210 square metres (109,900 sq ft). The Belogradchik Fortress was reconstructed to later become a proclaimed cultural monument. It is managed by the local historical museum authority.

== History ==
The initial fortress was constructed during the time when the region was part of the Roman Empire. The rock formations in the area served as a natural protection, as fortified walls were practically only built from the northwest and southeast, with the yard being surrounded by rocks up to 70 m (230 ft) high from the other sides.

Initially, the Belogradchik Fortress served for surveillance and not strictly defense. The Bulgarian tsar of Vidin, Ivan Stratsimir extended the old fortress in the 14th century, building fortified garrisons in front of the existing rock massifs. During Stratsimir's rule, the Belogradchik Fortress became one of the most important strongholds in the region, second only to the tsar's capital fortress of Vidin, Baba Vida.

During the Ottoman conquest of Bulgaria, the fortress was captured by the Ottomans in 1396. They were forced to further expand the stronghold due to the intensified hajduk and insurrectionist activity in the region.

Considerable changes to the fortress were made in the early 19th century. These changes were typical for the Ottoman castle architecture of the period, a full reorganization being carried out, as well as additional expansion. Typically European elements were added to the Belogradchik Fortress owing to the French and Italian engineers that participated in the expansion.

The stronghold had an important role in the Ottoman suppression of the Bulgarian Belogradchik Uprising of 1850. It was last used in warfare during the Serbo-Bulgarian War in 1885.

== Gallery ==
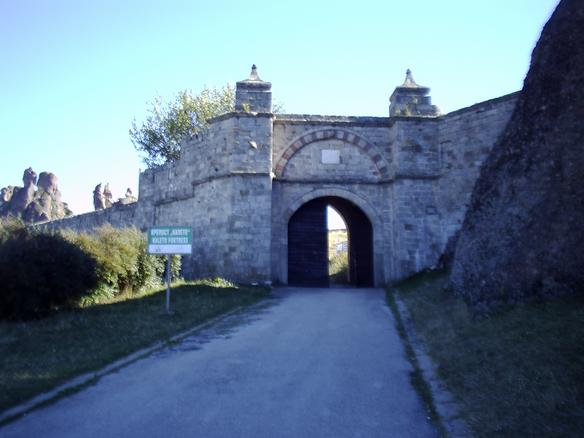
One of the fortress gates

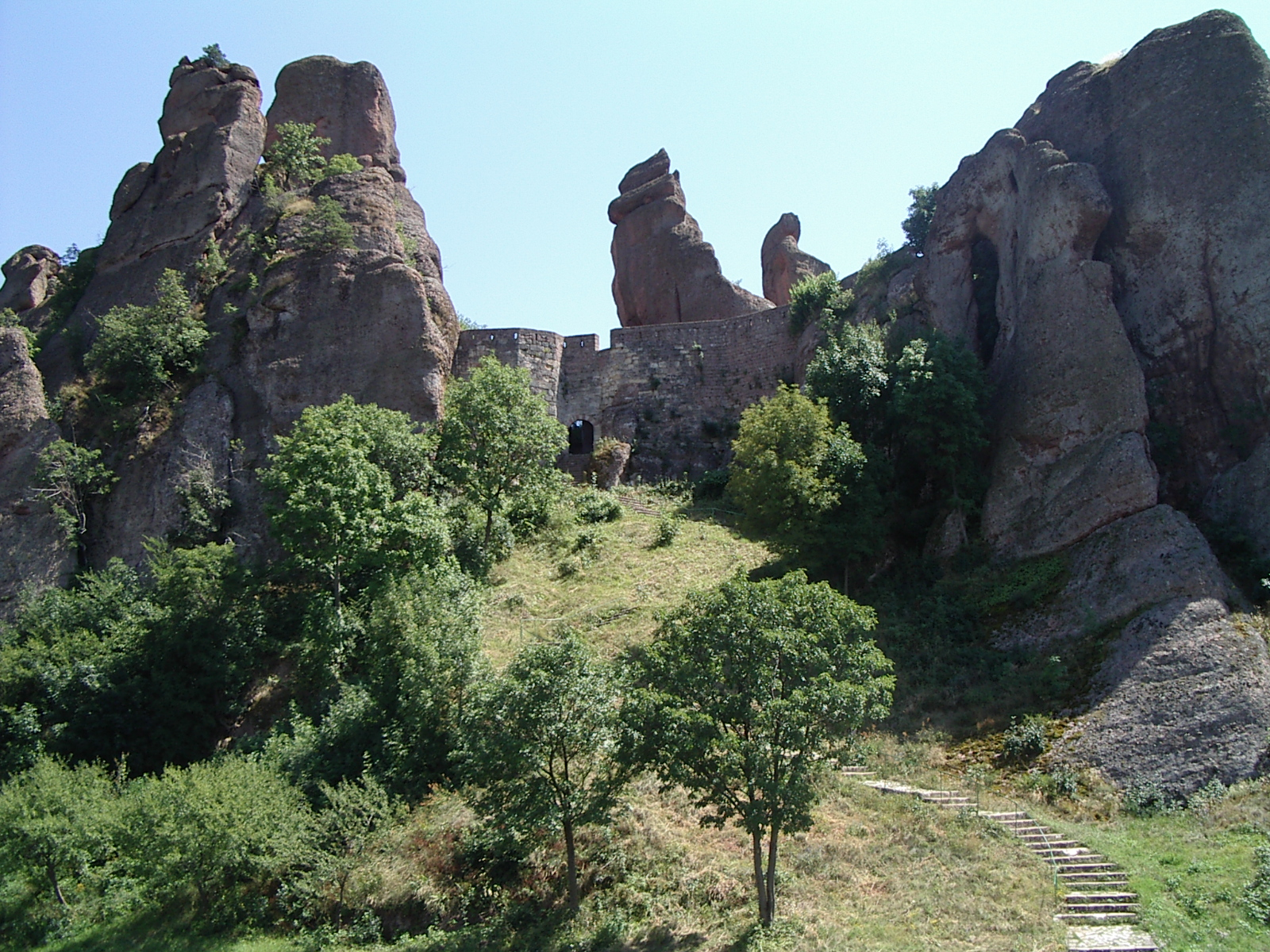

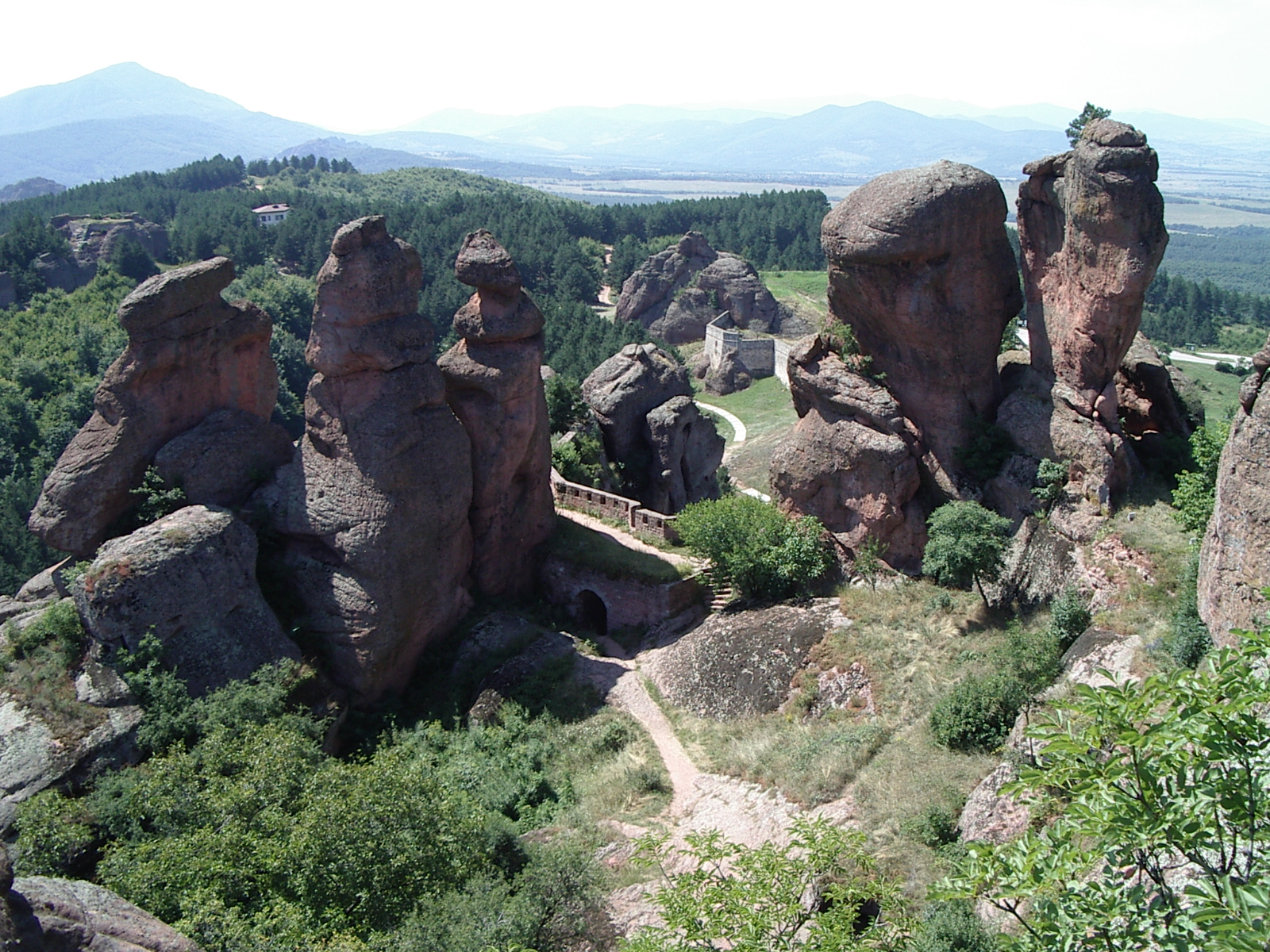

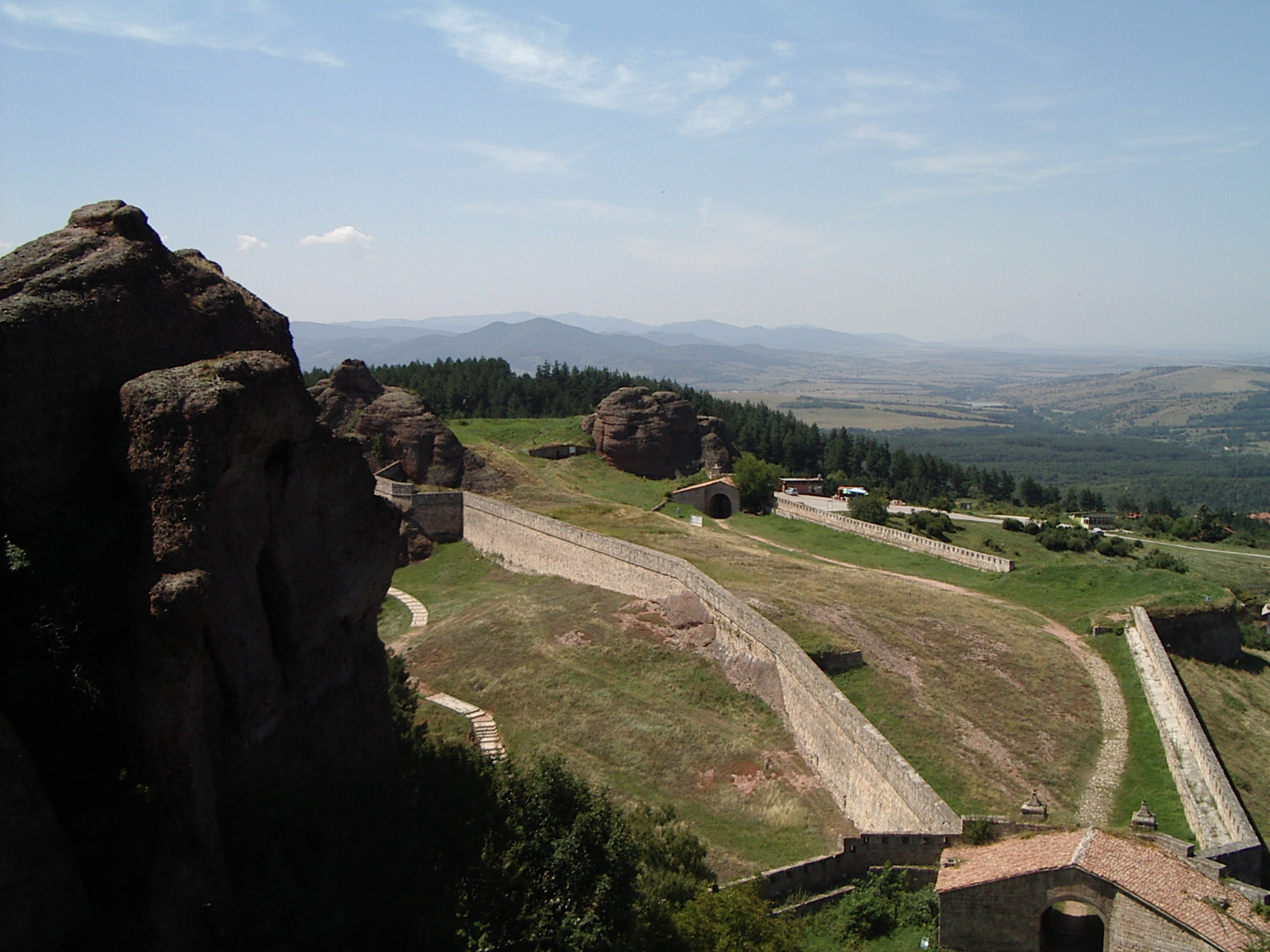

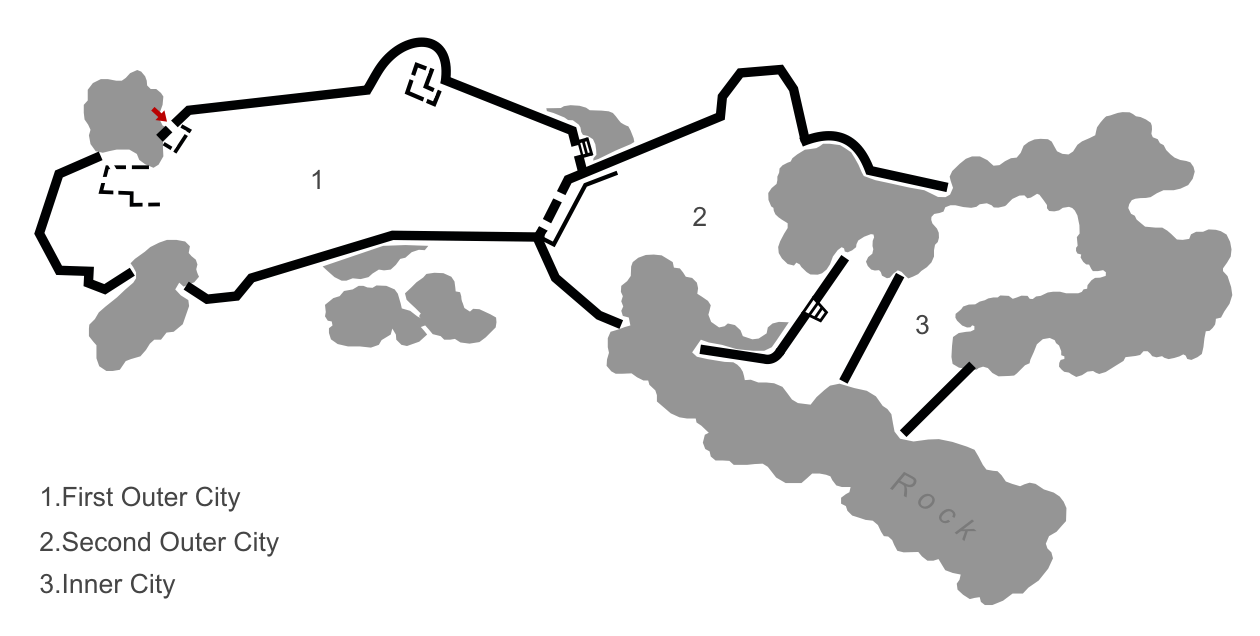
Plan
