= Arda (Maritsa tributary) =

River in Bulgaria, Greece and Turkey

Arda (Арда), Ardas (Άρδας)
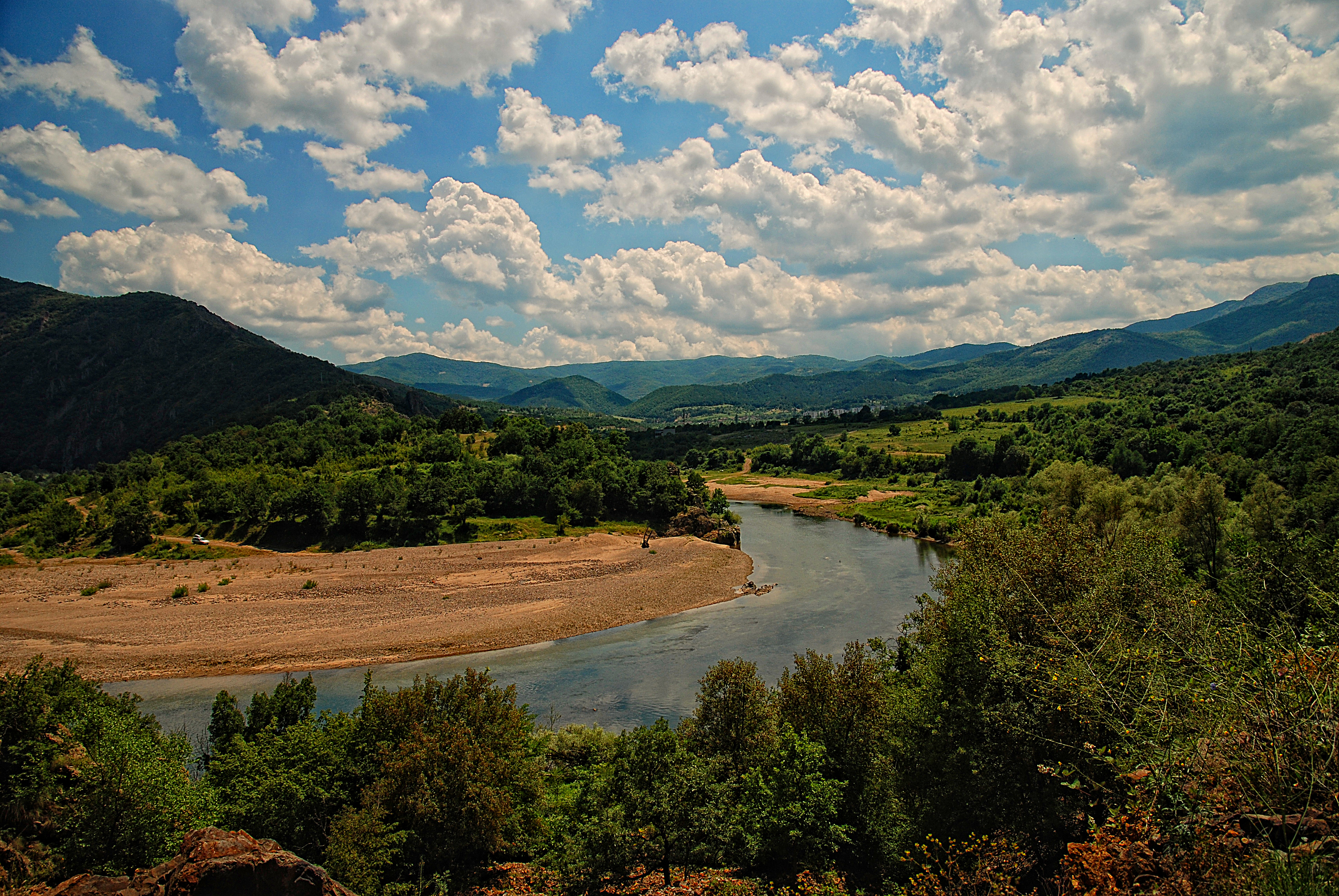
- The Arda at Valchi dol, Bulgaria

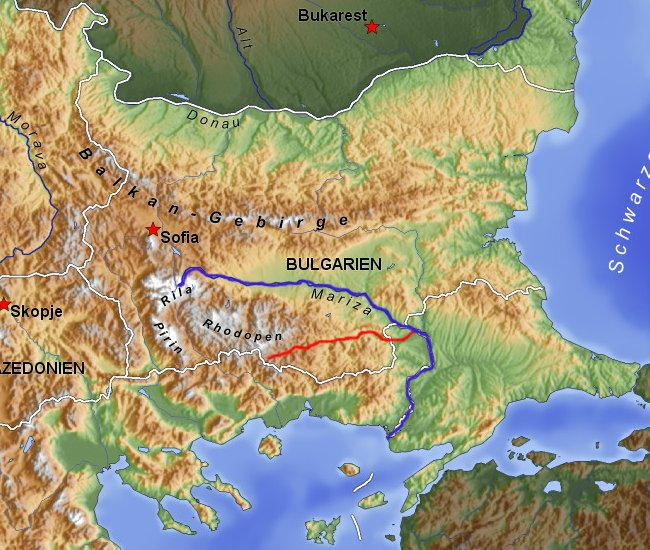
- Map of Arda River and Maritsa river

Location
- Countries: Bulgaria, Greece, and Turkey

Physical characteristics
- Source: Rhodope Mountains
  - location: Smolyan, Rhodopes, Bulgaria
  - coordinates: 41°25′52″N 24°36′36″E
  - elevation: 1,455 m (4,774 ft) (Ardin vrah)
- Mouth: Maritsa
  - location: Edirne, Turkey
  - coordinates: 41°39′39″N 26°29′42″E
  - elevation: 33 m (108 ft)
- Length: 290 km (180 mi); 229 km (142 mi) in Bulgaria
- Basin size: 5,795 km^{2} (2,237 mi^{2}); 5,213 km^{2} (2,013 sq mi) in Bulgaria

Basin features
- Progression: Maritsa→ Aegean Sea

The Arda (Bulgarian: Арда [ˈardɐ], Greek: Άρδας [ˈarðas], Turkish: Arda [ˈaɾda]) is a 290-kilometre-long (180 mi) river in Bulgaria and Greece. It is a tributary of the Maritsa (or Evros). Its source lies in the Bulgarian Rhodope Mountains near the village Arda, part of the municipality of Smolyan. It flows eastward past Rudozem, Kardzhali and Ivaylovgrad and enters Greece in the northern part of the Evros regional unit. It flows into the Maritsa on the border of Greece and Turkey, between the Greek village Kastanies and the Turkish city Edirne. In the Bulgarian section, there are three hydroelectric and irrigation dams, Kardzhali Dam, Studen Kladenets and Ivaylovgrad Dam. The Bulgarian section is 229 kilometres (142 mi) long, making the Arda the longest river in the Rhodopes. The medieval Dyavolski most arch bridge crosses the river 10 kilometres (6 mi) from Ardino.

The three floods of February 18, 2005, when the water level was at 4.8 metres (16 ft), March 1 and March 7, 2005, flooded the low-lying areas, especially the Kastanies area which turned into a lagoon. The merging of the waters of the Maritsa (Evros/Meriç) caused streets and buildings including homes to be flooded, leaving people stranded in their homes.

Arda Peak on Livingston Island in the South Shetland Islands, Antarctica and the mineral ardaite are named after the Arda river.

== Archeology and places of interest ==
The Arda valley and the valleys of its tributaries have been a preferred place for habitation since ancient times. A settlement from 6,000 BC was discovered during the construction works in the area of the town of Kardzhali. Many archeological sites were discovered in the region, including the famous Thracian cult complexes Perperek, known as Perperikon for the last 20 years, as well as the sacred site of Tatul. To cross the ancient roads to the Aegean, several stone bridges impressive in size and architecture, were built on the river. One fully preserved bridge is the Devil's Bridge in the village of Dyadovtsi (Ardino municipality). There are remnants of bridges in several places in the region: near the villages of Suhovo and Borovitsa, and another three have remained under the waters of the dams.

== Gallery ==
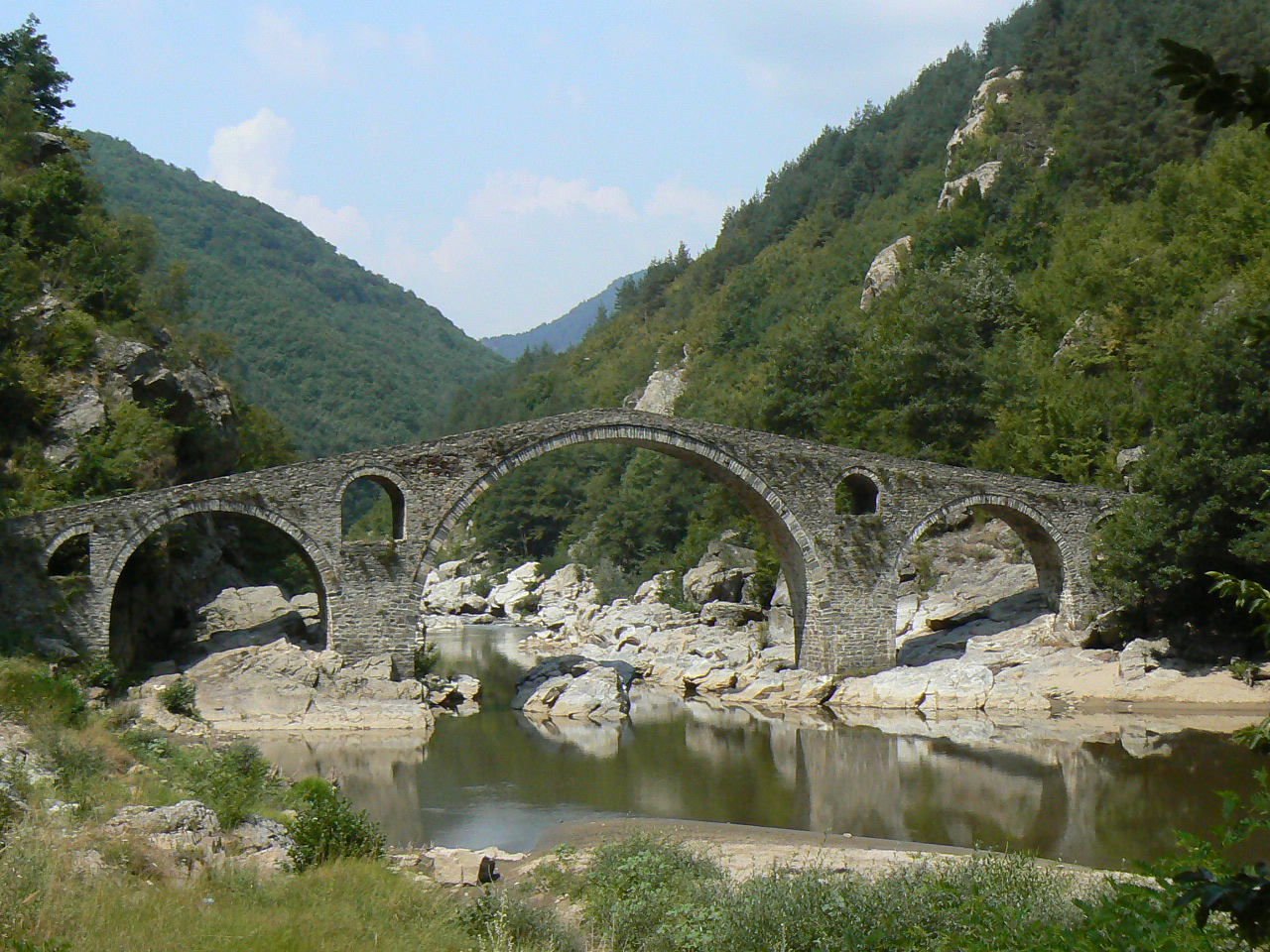
Devil's bridge near Ardino

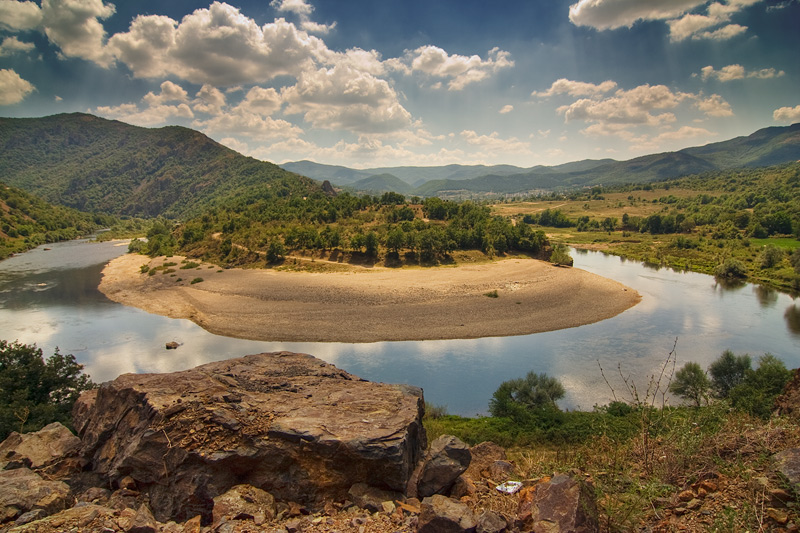
Arda's Meander in Bulgaria

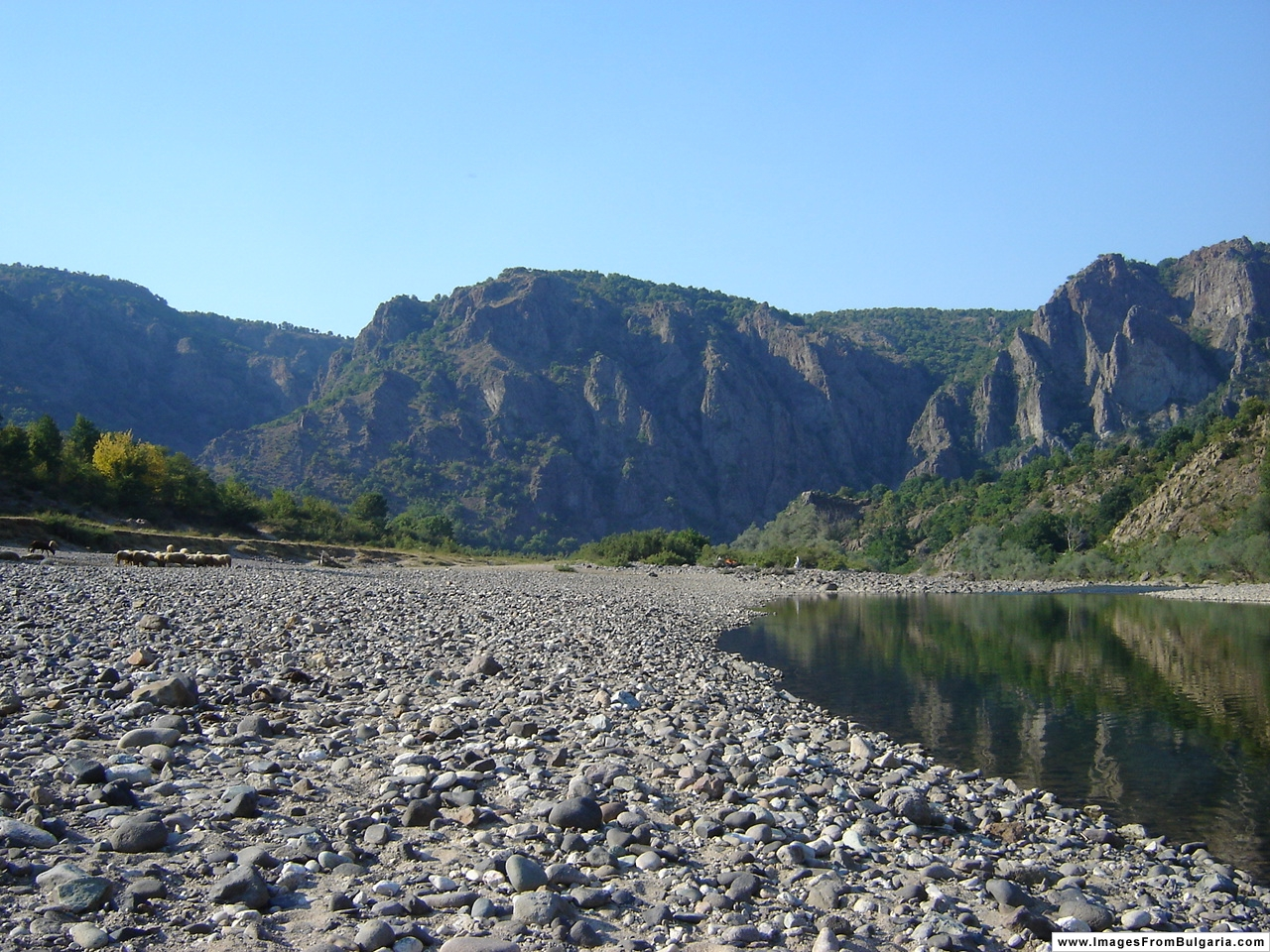
Near Madzharovo

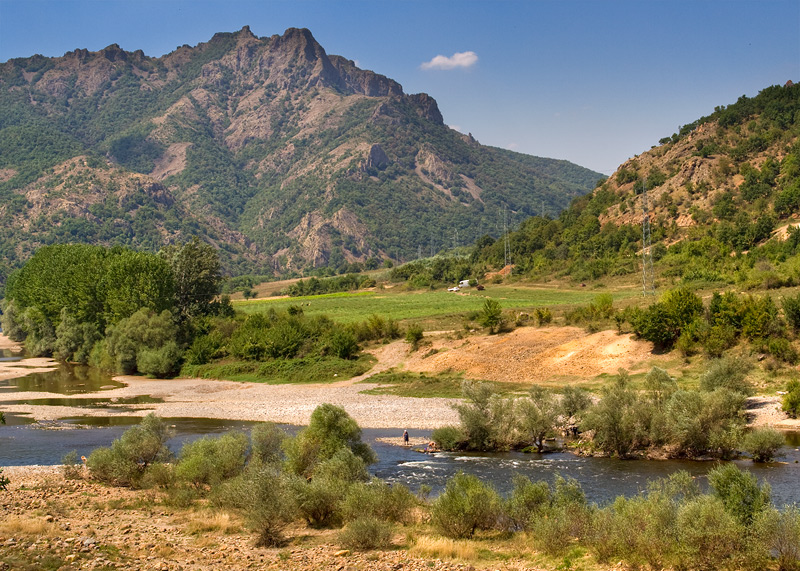
Near Madzharovo

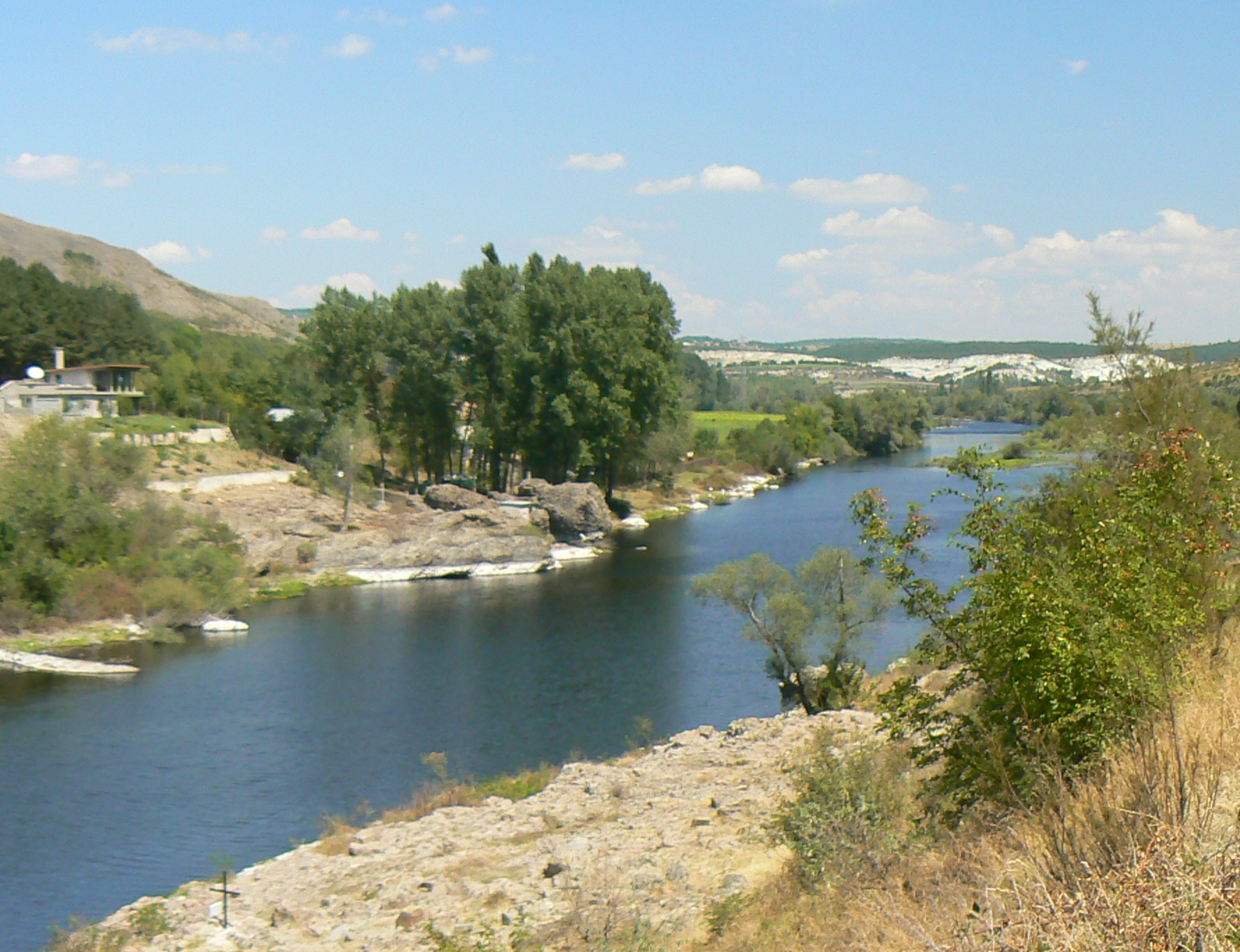
