= Ardino Municipality =

Ardino Municipality Община Ардино
- Municipality
- Location within Bulgaria
- Coordinates: 41°35′N 25°8′E
- Country: Bulgaria
- Province: Kardzhali
- Municipality: Ardino

Area
  - Total: 341.45 km^{2} (131.83 sq mi)

Population (1-Feb-2011)
  - Total: 13,326
  - Density: 39.028/km^{2} (101.08/sq mi)
- Time zone: UTC+2 (EET)
  - Summer (DST): UTC+3 (EEST)
- Website: www.ardino.bg

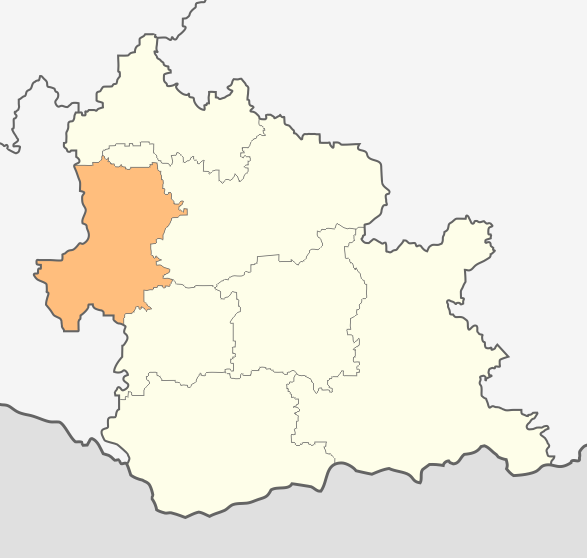
Ardino municipality within Kardzhali Province

Ardino Municipality is a municipality in Kardzhali Province, Bulgaria. It includes the town of Ardino and 51 nearby villages.

== Demographics ==
As of December 2018, the municipality of Ardino has 12,792 inhabitants. Only 4,002 inhabitants live in the town of Ardino and the remainder in one of the 51 villages.

The following table represents the change of the population in the province after World War II:

1946 Census	1956 Census	1965 Census	1975 Census	1985 Census	1992 Census	2001 Census	2011 Census	2018 Estimate
30,609	29,407	33,185	29,507	27,698	18,174	13,649	11,572	12,792

The municipality of Ardino has lost more than two thirds of its population in a period of seventy years.

=== Vital statistics ===
The municipality of Ardino recorded just 66 birth, down from 132 in 2000. At the same time there were 193 deaths, up from 168 deaths in 2000. Demographic trends in the municipality of Ardino have largely been unfavourable.

	Population	Live births	Deaths	Natural growth	Birth rate (‰)	Death rate (‰)	Natural growth rate (‰)
2000	17,898	132	168	-36	7.4	9.4	-2.0
2001	13,492	124	148	-24	9.2	11.0	-1.8
2002	13,410	103	144	-41	7.7	10.7	-3.1
2003	13,236	118	150	-32	8.9	11.3	-2.4
2004	13,102	137	136	1	10.5	10.4	0.1
2005	12,916	126	151	-25	9.8	11.7	-1.9
2006	12,686	126	192	-66	9.9	15.1	-5.2
2007	12,503	122	153	-31	9.8	12.2	-2.5
2008	12,368	122	152	-30	9.9	12.3	-2.4
2009	12,128	107	168	-61	8.8	13.9	-5.0
2010	12,282	90	132	-42	7.3	10.7	-3.4
2011	11,476	81	163	-82	7.1	14.2	-7.1
2012	11,412	83	172	-89	7.3	15.1	-7.8
2013	11,286	83	170	-87	7.4	15.1	-7.7
2014	11,956	78	159	-81	6.5	13.3	-6.8
2015	12,377	89	168	-79	7.2	13.6	-6.4
2016	12,424	85	177	-92	6.8	14.2	-7.4
2017	12,630	100	177	-77	7.9	14.0	-6.1
2018	12,792	66	193	-127	5.2	15.1	-9.9

=== Ethnic composition ===
A majority of the population consists of ethnic Bulgarian Turks (71.2%). Ethnic Bulgarians make up around 26.9% of the population. Most of those Bulgarians are Pomaks.

Ethnic groups in Ardino Municipality (2011 census)
Ethnic group	Percentage
Bulgarians	26.9%
Turks	71.2%
Romani	0.0%
others and indefinable	1.9%

=== Religion ===
According to the latest Bulgarian census of 2011, the religious composition, among those who answered the optional question on religious identification, was the following:

Religious composition of Ardino Municipality
Orthodox Christianity	2.1%
Catholicism	0.2%
Protestantism	0.0%
Islam	91.4%
No religion	1.1%
Prefer not to answer, others and indefinable	5.2%

Both ethnic Turks and Bulgarians are predominantly Islamic by faith.
