= List of castles in Bulgaria =

This is a partial list of fortifications in Bulgaria, including castles, castra, defensive walls, etc.

== Partial list of fortifications in Bulgaria ==
Sites included in the 100 Tourist Sites of Bulgaria

| Name | Image | Description | Location within Bulgaria |
|---|---|---|---|
| Anevo Fortress castle | | Anevo Fortress or Kopsis is a medieval castle in central Bulgaria, the ruins of which are located some three kilometres (two miles) from the village of Anevo in Sopot Municipality, Plovdiv Province. Constructed in the first half of the 12th century, it lies on a steep hilltop at the southern foot of the Balkan Mountains, not far from the Stryama river. In the end of the 13th century, the fortress was the capital of a small short-lived quasi-independent domain ruled by the brothers of Tsar Smilets of Bulgaria, Voysil and Radoslav. | List of castles in Bulgaria is located in Bulgaria |
| Asen's Fortress castle | | Asen's Fortress, identified by some researchers as Petrich, is a medieval fortress in the Rhodope Mountains, 2–3 km south of the town of Asenovgrad, on a high rocky ridge on the left bank of the Asenitsa River. Asen's Fortress is situated at an elevation of 279 m. The earliest archaeological findings date from the time of the Thracians, the area of the fortress being also inhabited during the Ancient Roman and Early Byzantine period. The fortress gained importance in the Middle Ages, first mentioned in the statute of the Bachkovo Monastery as Petrich in the 11th century. | List of castles in Bulgaria is located in Bulgaria |
| Baba Vida castle | | Baba Vida is a medieval castle in Vidin to the north-west of Bulgaria. It consists of two concentric curtain walls and about nine towers of which three are preserved to their full medieval height, including the original battlements. Baba Vida is situated at an altitude of 39 m. The castle was among Bulgaria's most important strongholds in the Middle Ages and served as a capital of the Second Bulgarian Empire and the Tsardom of Bdin (Vidin) before it was seized by the Ottoman Turks in 1422. | List of castles in Bulgaria is located in Bulgaria |
| Belogradchik Fortress fort | | Belogradchik Fortress, also known as Kaleto, is an ancient fortress located on the north slopes of the Balkan Mountains, close to the northwestern town of Belogradchik and is the town's primary cultural and historical tourist attraction, drawing, together with the Belogradchik Rocks, the main flow of tourists into the region. It is one of the best-preserved strongholds in Bulgaria and a cultural monument of national importance. | List of castles in Bulgaria is located in Bulgaria |
| Bozhenishki Urvich castle | | Bozhenishki Urvich is a ruined fortress on the northern slopes of Lakavishki Ridge in the western Balkan Mountains at 3 km south of village Bozhenitsa and 20 km from the town of Botevgrad. It flourished during the Second Bulgarian Empire in the 13th and 14th centuries and the destroyed by the Ottomans in the aftermath of the Bulgarian–Ottoman wars. | List of castles in Bulgaria is located in Bulgaria |
| Byalgrad castle | | Byalgrad is a medieval fortress located eight kilometres from the village Gugutka in Haskovo Province, southeastern Bulgaria. Byalgrad's walls reach up to eight metres in height and are two metres thick. The fortress was built in the 12th century and its best preserved part is the dungeon. The fortress' name (meaning "white town" in Bulgarian) comes from the bright colour of its limestone walls. It was reconstructed during the Ottoman rule of Bulgaria. | List of castles in Bulgaria is located in Bulgaria |
| Castra Martis castrum | | Castra Martis is a Roman fortress (castra) in the Roman province of Dacia Ripensis on the modern town of Kula, in Vidin Province. Castra Martis has the best preserved Roman walls in Bulgaria and one of the best preserved in Europe. The height reaches 17 m. It used to protect the road through Vrashka Chuka pass in the western Balkan mountains. In 408, the Huns under Uldin took control of the site during an attack on the Eastern Roman Empire, apparently by treachery. | List of castles in Bulgaria is located in Bulgaria |
| Castra ad Montanesium castrum | | Montanesium is a Roman castrum founded in the 1st century AD, situated in the town of Montana. The fortress was constructed in the first century AD to give a defensive buff to the Roman town. | List of castles in Bulgaria is located in Bulgaria |
| Cherven castle | | Cherven was one of the Second Bulgarian Empire's primary military, administrative, economic and cultural centres between the 12th and the 14th century. The ruins of the fortress are located near the village of the same name 30–35 km south of Ruse, northeastern Bulgaria. During the second half of the 14th century, the stronghold's area exceeded 1 km^{2} and had intensive urban development. Cherven was conquered by the Ottoman Turks in 1388 during the Bulgarian–Ottoman wars, initially retaining its administrative functions but later declining in importance. | List of castles in Bulgaria is located in Bulgaria |
| Devingrad castle | | Devingrad, also known as Momina Krepost (Maiden's Fortress) is a medieval stronghold located on the hill of the same name in Veliko Tarnovo in northern Bulgaria. It was one of the three fortresses of the medieval city of Tarnovgrad, the capital of the Second Bulgarian Empire, along the Tsarevets and Trapezitsa. There few remaining traces of the structure. | List of castles in Bulgaria is located in Bulgaria |
| Gate of Trajan castle | | The Gate of Trajan is a historic mountain pass near Ihtiman in western Bulgaria. It was named after Roman Emperor Trajan, on whose order a fortress by the name of Stipon was constructed on the hill over the pass, as a symbolic border between the provinces of Thrace and Macedonia. The pass is primarily known for the major medieval battle of 17 August 986, during which the forces of Byzantine Emperor Basil II were routed by Emperor Samuel of Bulgaria, effectively halting a Byzantine campaign in the Bulgarian lands. | List of castles in Bulgaria is located in Bulgaria |
| Hisarya city walls | | The city walls of Hisarya date from the Roman Empire, when the settlement was known as Diocletianopolis. Hisarya has one of the best preserved Roman walls in Bulgaria and one of the best preserved in Europe. Their length is 2327 m, the width varies between 2.60 and 4 m, and the height reaches 12.5 m. There were 44 towers, 4 main gates and 6 smaller entrances. Two of the gates, the southern and the western, are well preserved. | List of castles in Bulgaria is located in Bulgaria |
| Hisarlaka fortress | | Hisarlaka is a late Antiquity and medieval fortress occupying a hill at 2 km to the south-east of Kyustendil. Originally constructed by the Romans, it was among the most important castles of the Bulgarian Empire in the Middle Ages before it was partially destroyed by the Ottomans in the 15th century. | List of castles in Bulgaria is located in Bulgaria |
| Kaliakra castle | | Kaliakra is a long and narrow headland in the Southern Dobruja region of the northern Bulgarian Black Sea Coast, located 12 km east of Kavarna and 60 km northeast of Varna. The coast is steep with vertical cliffs reaching 70 m down to the sea. It features the remnants of the fortified walls, water-main, baths. It was an important fortress of the Bulgarian Empire and in the late 14th century served as the residence of the Bulgarian Despot Dobrotitsa, ruler in the short-lived semi-independent Despotate of Dobruja. | List of castles in Bulgaria is located in Bulgaria |
| Kipilovo Fortress fort | | The fortress of Kipilovo (Bulgarian: Кипилово) was one of the Byzantine Empire's military fortresses built to defend Constantinople . The ruins of the fortress are located on Mount Hissarluka - 3.4 km south in a straight line from the center of the village Kipilovo, Sliven Province, Bulgaria. | List of castles in Bulgaria is located in Bulgaria |
| Kovachevsko kale castrum | | Kovachevsko kale is a late Roman fortress, whose ruins are located 6 km west of the town of Popovo, near the modern road Popovo - Byala. The ancient name of the settlement is unknown. The Czech archaeologist Karel Škorpil called it Kovachoveshko kale, after the name of the nearby village, Kovachevets. The fortress is located on a flat terrain, naturally protected by low-water rivers. It has a roughly triangular form. The defensive stone walls are fortified with 17 U-shaped towers. There are two gates, one to the west, to other one to the north-east. | List of castles in Bulgaria is located in Bulgaria |
| Krakra Fortress castle | | Named after the 11th century Bulgarian boyar Krakra of Pernik, the fortress is situated in the city of Pernik, Pernik Province. It played an important role in the defense of the First Bulgarian Empire during the Byzantine conquest of Bulgaria in the early 11th century. It was unsuccessfully besieged by the Byzantine emperor Basil II in 1004 and 1016. | List of castles in Bulgaria is located in Bulgaria |
| Krasen castle | | Krasen or Krasen Kale is a fortress near the village of Bata in Pazardzhik Province. It is situated at around 3 km of the village and 6 km to the south of the municipal center Panagyurishte. The castle has been dated to the 10th century AD and is currently in ruins. The remains of the walls reach up to six meters. | List of castles in Bulgaria is located in Bulgaria |
| Krivus castle | | Krivus is a medieval fortress in the valley of the river Arda in the eastern Rhodope Mountains in Kardzhali Province. It raises over a steep hill. There partially preserved ruins of the walls reaching height of up to 5 m. | List of castles in Bulgaria is located in Bulgaria |
| Ktenia castle | | Ktenia is a ruined Roman and medieval fortress, situated 2.1 km to the north of the village of Lozarevo, Burgas Province in south-eastern Bulgaria. In the Middle Ages, Ktenia often changed hands between Bulgaria and Byzantium. The ruins of the fortress lie north-east of the town of Sungurlare, in the Grebenets section of the Eastern Balkan Mountains. In ancient and medieval times, it served as an important defensive position guarding the Karnobat Pass through the mountains. Neighbouring castles included Rusokastro to the southeast and Aytos to the east. | List of castles in Bulgaria is located in Bulgaria |
| Lardea castle | | Lardea or Lardeya is a ruined late Roman and medieval fortress, situated near the village of Lozenets, Yambol Province, in south-eastern Bulgaria. In the Middle Ages, Lardea often changed hands between the Bulgarian and the Byzantine Empires. | List of castles in Bulgaria is located in Bulgaria |
| Lovech fortress castle | | The fortress of Lovech is a medieval stronghold that gained prominence during the Second Bulgarian Empire. After Byzantine unsuccessfully besieged Lovech in 1187 they were forced to recognize de facto the restoration of the Bulgarian state. It remained an important economic and commercial centre until the fall of Bulgaria under Ottoman rule in the early 15th century. | List of castles in Bulgaria is located in Bulgaria |
| Lyutitsa castle | | Lyutitsa is one of the largest and best preserved castles in the easternmost part of the Eastern Rhodopes, located 3.5 hours' walk south-west of Ivaylovgrad in southernmost Bulgaria. It is also known as the "Marble City" because its walls are made of white marble. The fortress occupies an area of 26,000 m^{2} (280,000 sq ft) and has 12 towers of which eight have been preserved. The walls are up to 10 m (33 ft) high. The ruins of two churches have been excavated as well as a necropolis with 15 graves. Among the numerous archaeological finds are rare coins, ceramics of Preslav, jewelry and tools. | List of castles in Bulgaria is located in Bulgaria |
| Markeli fort | | Markeli was a medieval Byzantine and Bulgarian frontier stronghold, the ruins of which are located in Karnobat Municipality, Burgas Province in the south-east of the country. Dating to Late Antiquity, the castle lay some 7.5 km (4 3/4 mi) from the modern town of Karnobat. It was the site of two notable medieval battles between Byzantines and Bulgarians, the Battle of Marcellae of 756 and the Battle of Marcellae of 792. | List of castles in Bulgaria is located in Bulgaria |
| Matochina Fortress castle | | Matochina Fortress, also known as Bukelon, lies on a plateau to the northeast of the village itself. The only well-preserved part of the castle today is the inner fortress with the keep, which is 18 metres in height and dates to the 12th–14th century. The keep is a three-storey tower with arrow loops on all sides. The third storey was reportedly used as a chapel for the defenders. The keep was constructed out of stone and bricks. A cross-shaped brick monogram to the side of the entrance indicates that the fortress may have been reconstructed by the Bulgarian Emperor Michael Shishman (r. 1323–1330). | List of castles in Bulgaria is located in Bulgaria |
| Mezek Fortress castle | | Mezek Fortress, 6.5 decares (6,500 square metres) in area, is among the best preserved Bulgarian medieval castles. It dates to the 11th century. Along with the Thracian tombs located nearby, it was studied by a team under archaeologist Bogdan Filov in 1931–1932. The castle has nine towers, five of which lie at the vulnerable south wall. The fortress was built out of stone, with two decorative lines of bricks on the outside. It suffered some destruction around 1900, when stones from the fortress were used for the construction of Ottoman barracks in Svilengrad. | List of castles in Bulgaria is located in Bulgaria |
| Momina Kula castle | | Momina Kula is a Late Antiquity and medieval fortress, situated in the Momina Klisura Gorge along the river Mesta near the village of Kremen in Blagoevgrad Province. It is situated on a peak with vertical cliffs to the north, east and south. The only access is to the west where the walls are preserved at their entire length at the height of 5 m. To the east are located the remains of a quadrangular tower. | List of castles in Bulgaria is located in Bulgaria |
| Monyak castle | | Monyak is a medieval fortress situated over the left bank of the river Arda in the eastern Rhodope Mountains near the village of Shiroko pole in Kardzhali Province. It is situated close to the fortress of Vishegrad on the right bank of the Arda. Its outer walls are partially preserved, reaching height of up to 8 m | List of castles in Bulgaria is located in Bulgaria |
| Nesebar fortifications | | The first fortifications of Nesebar, the ancient Messembria, were constructed in the 8th century BC. They were improved by the Ancient Greeks in the 5-4th century BC, and subsequently by the Byzantines in the 5th century AD. In the Middle Ages the city often changed hands between the Bulgarian and the Byzantine Empires and the fortifications were frequently reconstructed. The last reconstruction was in the 14th century by Emperor Ivan Alexander of Bulgaria. | List of castles in Bulgaria is located in Bulgaria |
| Ovech Fortress castle | | During the Middle Ages Ovech was a key centre of the First Bulgarian Empire with an important monastery at the modern village of Ravna and a major scriptorium of the Preslav Literary School. During the Uprising of Ivaylo the rebel leader and subsequently emperor of Bulgaria Ivaylo defeated a 10,000-strong Byzantine army near the city in 1279. During the Second Bulgarian Empire Ovech was the seat of a metropolitan in the 14th century. Ovech was captured by the Ottomans in 1388 after a long siege. | List of castles in Bulgaria is located in Bulgaria |
| Patmos Fortress castle | | Patmos is a medieval fortress situated near the confluence of the rivers Arda and Borovitsa in the eastern Rhodope Mountains in Kardzhali Province. There partially preserved ruins of the walls, as well as the foundations of a church and a tower. | List of castles in Bulgaria is located in Bulgaria |
| Peristera Fortress castle | | Peristera is a fortress dated from the Late Antiquity and the Middle Ages situated in the Rhodope Mountains near the town of Peshtera in Pazardzhik Province. Peristera had three lines of defensive walls and six towers. It was destroyed by the Ottoman invaders in the 14th century. | List of castles in Bulgaria is located in Bulgaria |
| Perperikon castle | | Perperikon is an ancient Thracian city, which in the Middle Ages functioned as a fortress. It is situated in the eastern Rhodope Mountains some 15 km northeast of the town of Kardzhali. There are remains of a tower and the walls, in addition to the excavated areas of the ancient city. | List of castles in Bulgaria is located in Bulgaria |
| Plovdiv fortifications | | The fortifications of Plovdiv were centred on Nebet Tepe, one of the seven hills of the city. The earliest settlement is dated back to the 6th millennium BC but the remains of the fortifications are mainly from the Roman and medieval periods. Partially preserved remains of the defensive system are Hisar Kapia and the Eastern gate of Philippopolis. | List of castles in Bulgaria is located in Bulgaria |
| Shumen Fortress castle | | The origin of the Shumen fortress can be traced to the early Iron Age and was later owned by the Thracians in the 5th century BC. From 2nd to 4th centuries AD, it was controlled by the Romans who built towers and walls, and it was refurbished by the Byzantines as a garrison town. Shumen thrived in the Middle Ages as an important stronghold of the Bulgarian Empire. In 1444 it was destroyed by the Ottomans after their victory in the Battle of Varna over a Christian army under Władysław III of Poland. The fortress remained deserted ever since. | List of castles in Bulgaria is located in Bulgaria |
| Sostra castrum | | Sostra is an ancient Roman castrum situated near the village of Lomets in Lovech Province. It was constructed c. 147 AD by order of Emperor Antoninus Pius but was ravaged by the Goths in 249. Sostra was destroyed completely by the Huns in the 5th century AD. | List of castles in Bulgaria is located in Bulgaria |
| Storgosia fort | | Storgosia was a Roman road station located in the vicinity of modern Pleven, north-central Bulgaria. It accommodated detachments of Legio I Italica's Novae (modern Svishtov) garrison. The station grew to become a fortress in Late Antiquity due to Gothic and other Barbarian raids after 238. The fortress existed until the end of the 6th century, when the settlement of the Slavs apparently led to its abandonment. | List of castles in Bulgaria is located in Bulgaria |
| Trapezitsa fortress | | Trapezitsa is one of the three fortresses of Tarnovgrad, the capital of the Second Bulgarian Empire, along with Tsarevets and Devingrad. It enclosed the second largest neighbourhood of the medieval city with 17 churches and a number of noble residences. Some of the wall sections have been partially restored | List of castles in Bulgaria is located in Bulgaria |
| Tsarevets castle | | Tsarevets is a medieval stronghold located on a hill with the same name in Veliko Tarnovo in northern Bulgaria. Tsarevets is situated at an altitude of 206 m. It served as the Second Bulgarian Empire's primary fortress and strongest bulwark from 1185 to 1393, housing the imperial and the patriarchal palaces, and is nowadays a popular tourist attraction. | List of castles in Bulgaria is located in Bulgaria |
| Tsepina castle | | Tsepina was a castle and town in the western Rhodope Mountains, now in ruins. It is located at 6 km from the Dorkovo village in the north-eastern part of the Chepinska valley. Tsepina was built on a steep height at 1,136 m above sea level. Its outer walls closed an area of 25 decares and was dominated by a citadel located at the top of the cliff. The foundations of three churches have been excavated as well as four large water storage tanks up to 10 m deep. | List of castles in Bulgaria is located in Bulgaria |
| Urvich castle | | Urvich, also known as Kokalyane Urvich after the nearby village, is a medieval fortress in the territory of today's quarter Pancharevo of the capital Sofia. It is located on the right bank of Iskar River, on the hill of "Sredobardie", in the Lozen mountain, about 20 km from Sofia downtown on the road to Samokov. The fortress was constructed in the 13th century during the Second Bulgarian Empire. | List of castles in Bulgaria is located in Bulgaria |
| Ustra castle | | Ustra is a castle in the eastern Rhodope Mountains in southern Bulgaria. Its ruins lie 4 km (2 1/2 mi) southwest of the village of Ustren situated on a hill at approximately 800 m (2,600 ft) above sea level. The fortress was built in the 10th century AD to protect an important trade route. It was taken by the armies of Simeon the Great (r. 893-927), but after his death, it was among the lands given back to Byzantium in return for recognition of the imperial title of the Bulgarian rulers. Between the 12th and 14th centuries, it frequently changed hands between the two empires, but the Byzantines held it most of the time. | List of castles in Bulgaria is located in Bulgaria |
| Vishegrad Fortress castle | | Vishegrad is a fortress dated from the Late Antiquity and the Middle Ages situated over the right bank of the river Arda in the eastern Rhodope Mountains near the village of the same name in Kardzhali Province. It is situated close to the fortress of Monyak on the left bank of the Arda. | List of castles in Bulgaria is located in Bulgaria |
