= Kipilovo Fortress =

- Кипиловско кале
- Kipilovo, Sliven Province, Bulgaria
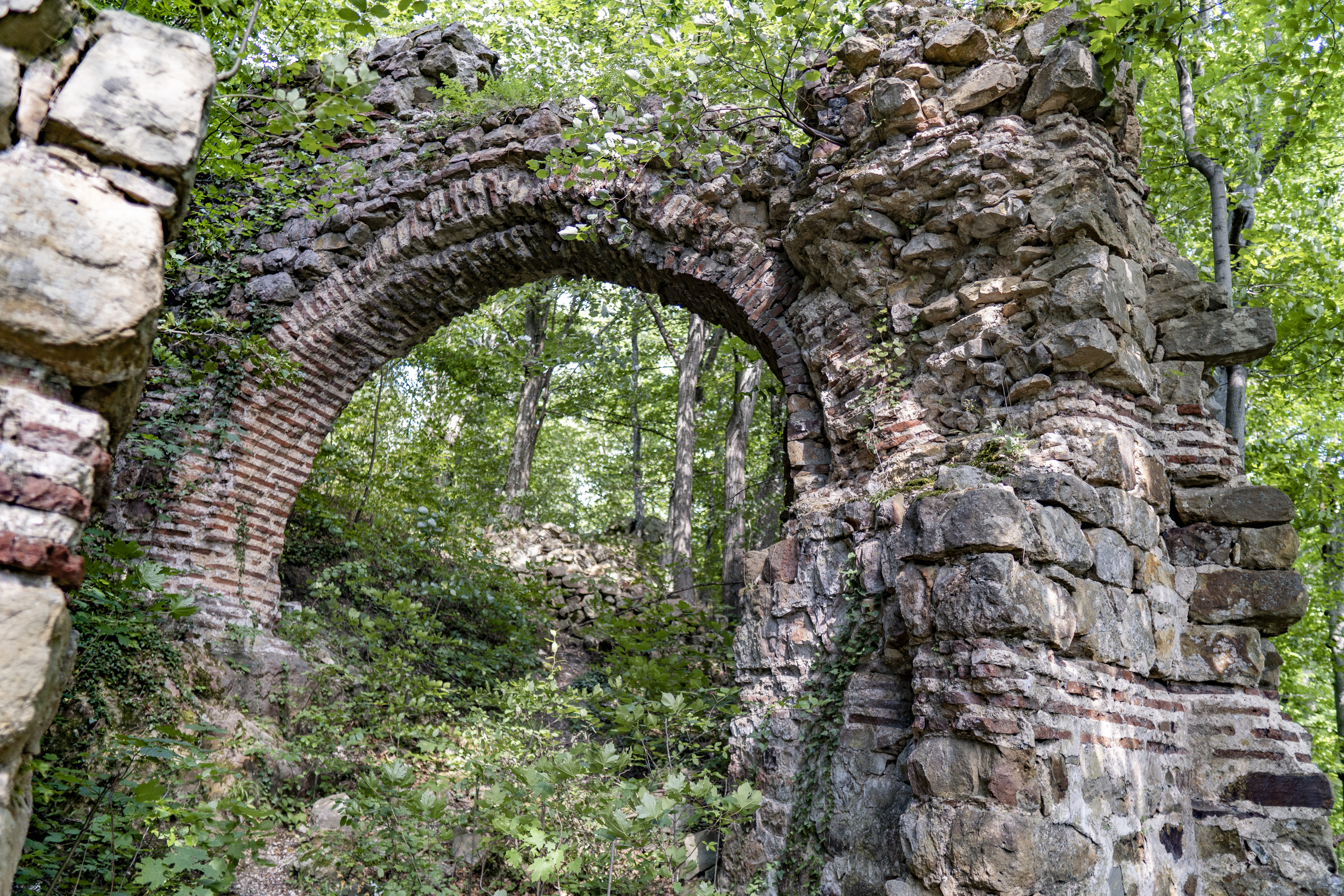
- Main gate of Kipilovo Fortress

Site information
- Condition: In ruins

Location
- Coordinates: 42°52′09″N 26°14′40″E

The fortress of Kipilovo (Bulgarian: Кипилово) was one of the Byzantine Empire's military fortresses built to defend Constantinople. The ruins of the fortress are located on Mount Hisarlaka in the Balkan Mountains - 3.4 km south in a straight line from the center of the village Kipilovo, in central Bulgaria.

== History and description ==
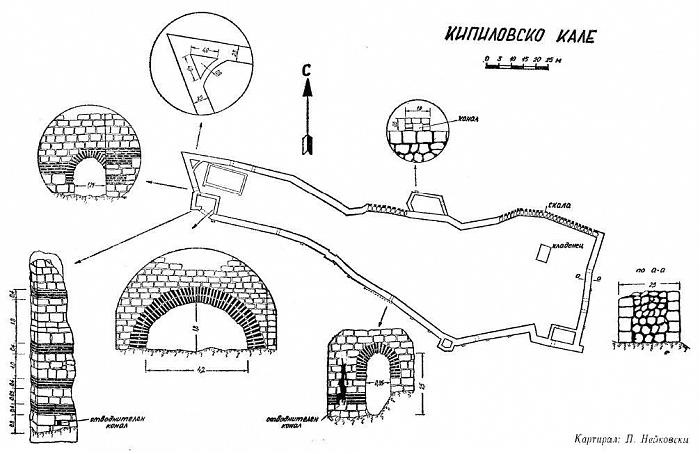
Kipilovo Fortress map

The fortress was built on Hisarlaka peak in late 6th century by the Byzantines. They used the opus mixtum technique and red plaster. The walls were 2.5 meters thick and in some places 8-10 meter in height. The Škorpil brothers (Karel Škorpil and Hermann Škorpil) suggested that the ancient fortress of Kirpillon Pelon was located here, hence the name of the village. The fortress was part of a system meant to defend Constantinople from the barbarian attacks from the north and it remained in use until the Second Bulgarian Empire.

The shape of the fortress is irregular trapezoidal with a wide base to the southeast. It is 181 m long, with a maximum width of 59 m and occupies an area of about 8.000 square metres. The whole area of the fortress is now overgrown with trees and shrubs.

There were many buildings in the north-western part of the fortress with some walls preserved up to 1–2 m in height. Their entrances and some of the conical loopholes are clearly visible. It is possible that these solid buildings served as dwellings for the guards at the main entrance. Towards the middle of the fortress in the natural rocks there is a small water tank, perhaps natural or artificially cut. The real tank from which the fortress was supplied with water is located in its south part. This is an artificially carved pool in the rocks, surrounded above by walls. It is possible that it was covered, as it can be deduced from the side walls. Between the two reservoirs there is a foundation of a ruined building, with approximate dimensions of 9 by 6 m, oriented exactly east - west. It is possible that this was a church-chapel, but to confirm this assumption excavations are needed. Outside the fortress there were not found any other buildings, except for a stone road, 4–5 m wide, which is partially preserved in its beginning. There are still three well preserved entrances to the fortress.

== Gallery ==
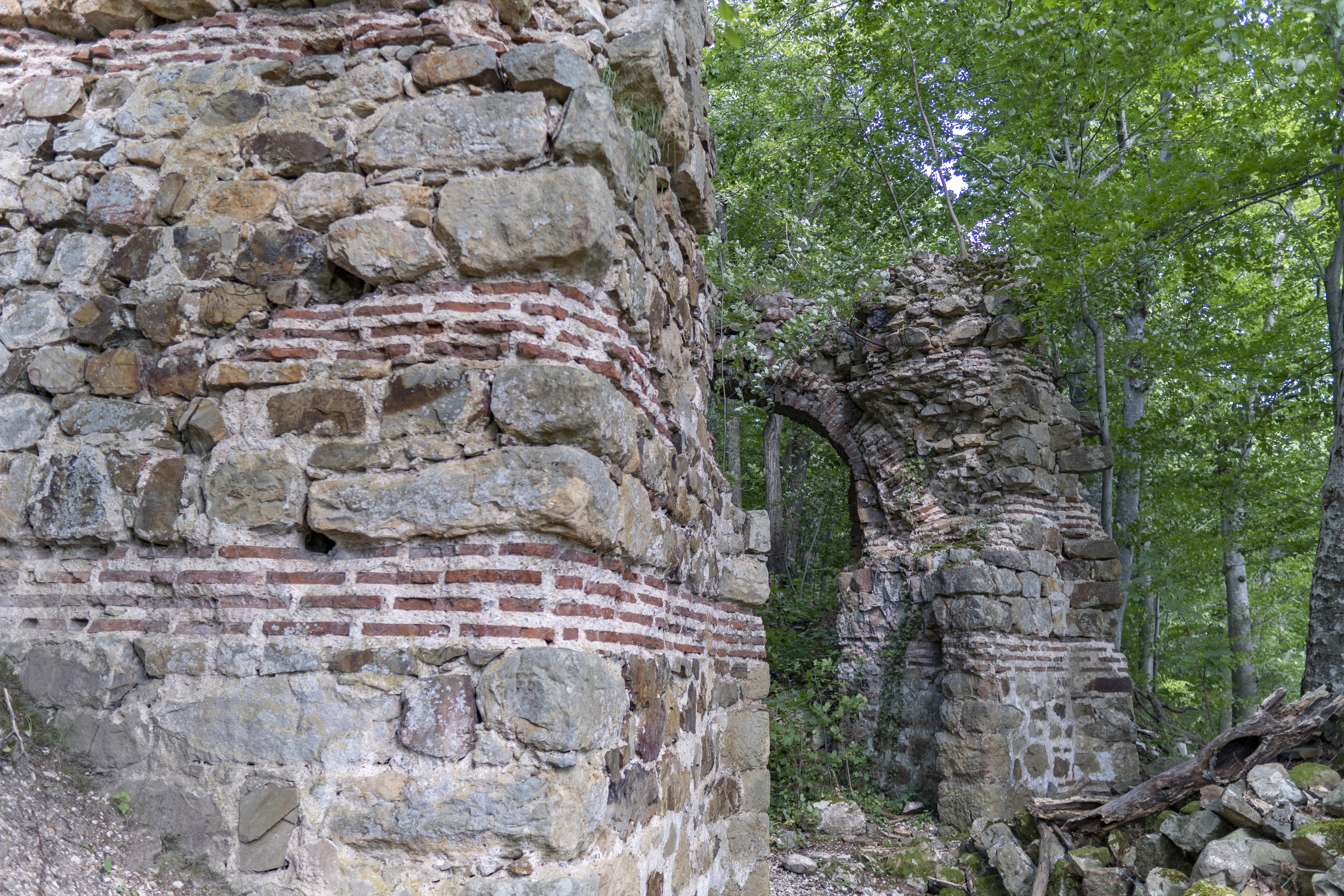

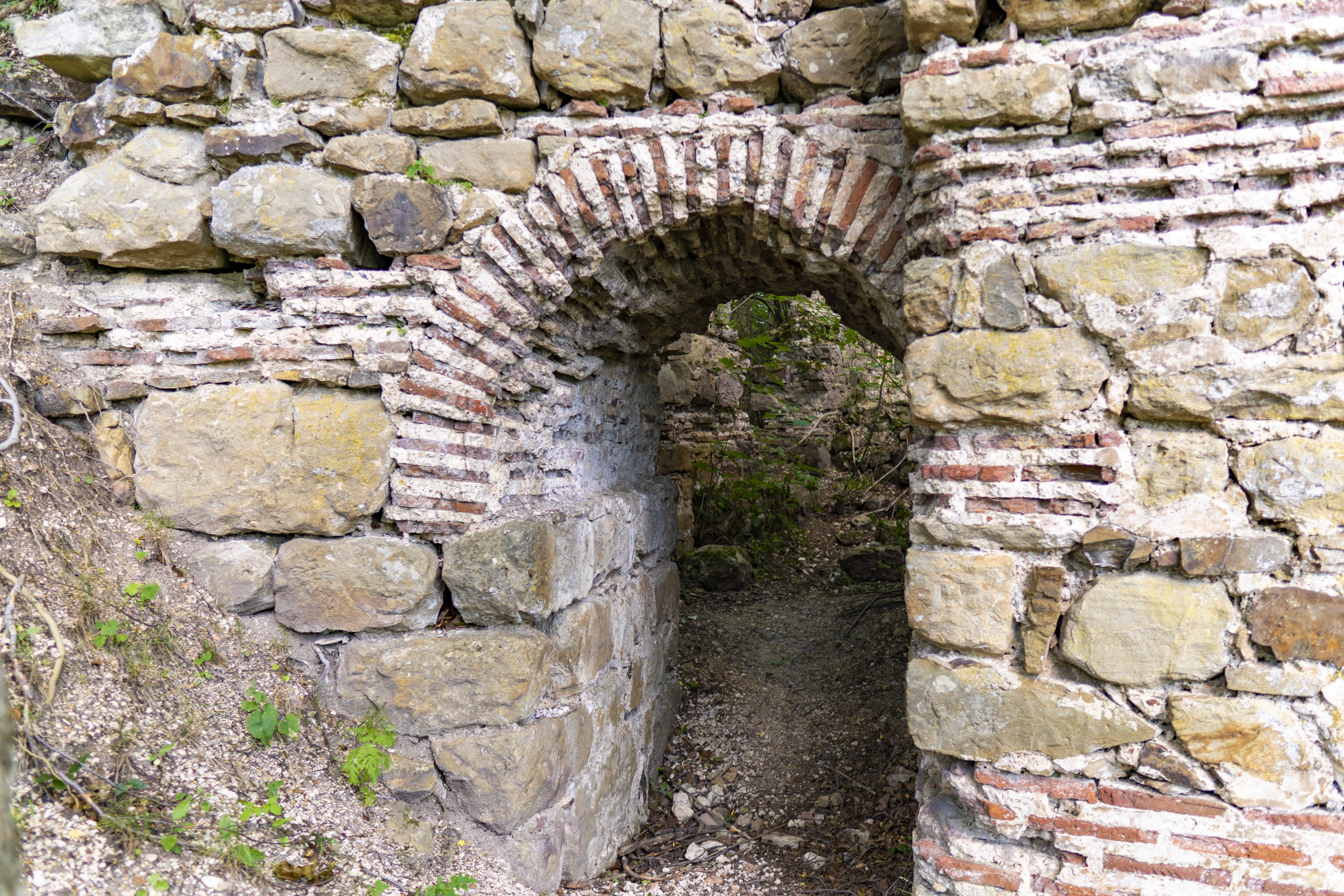

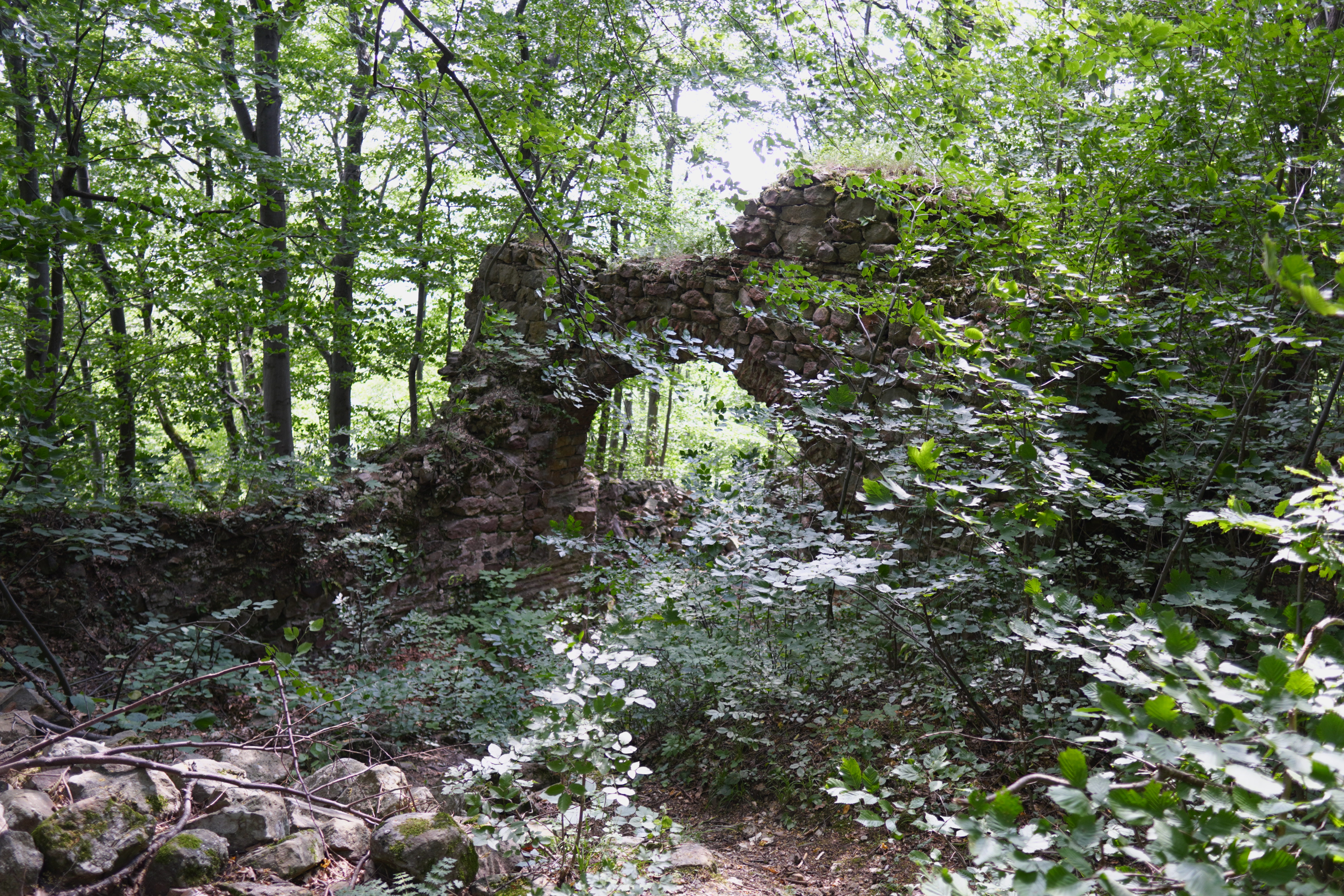

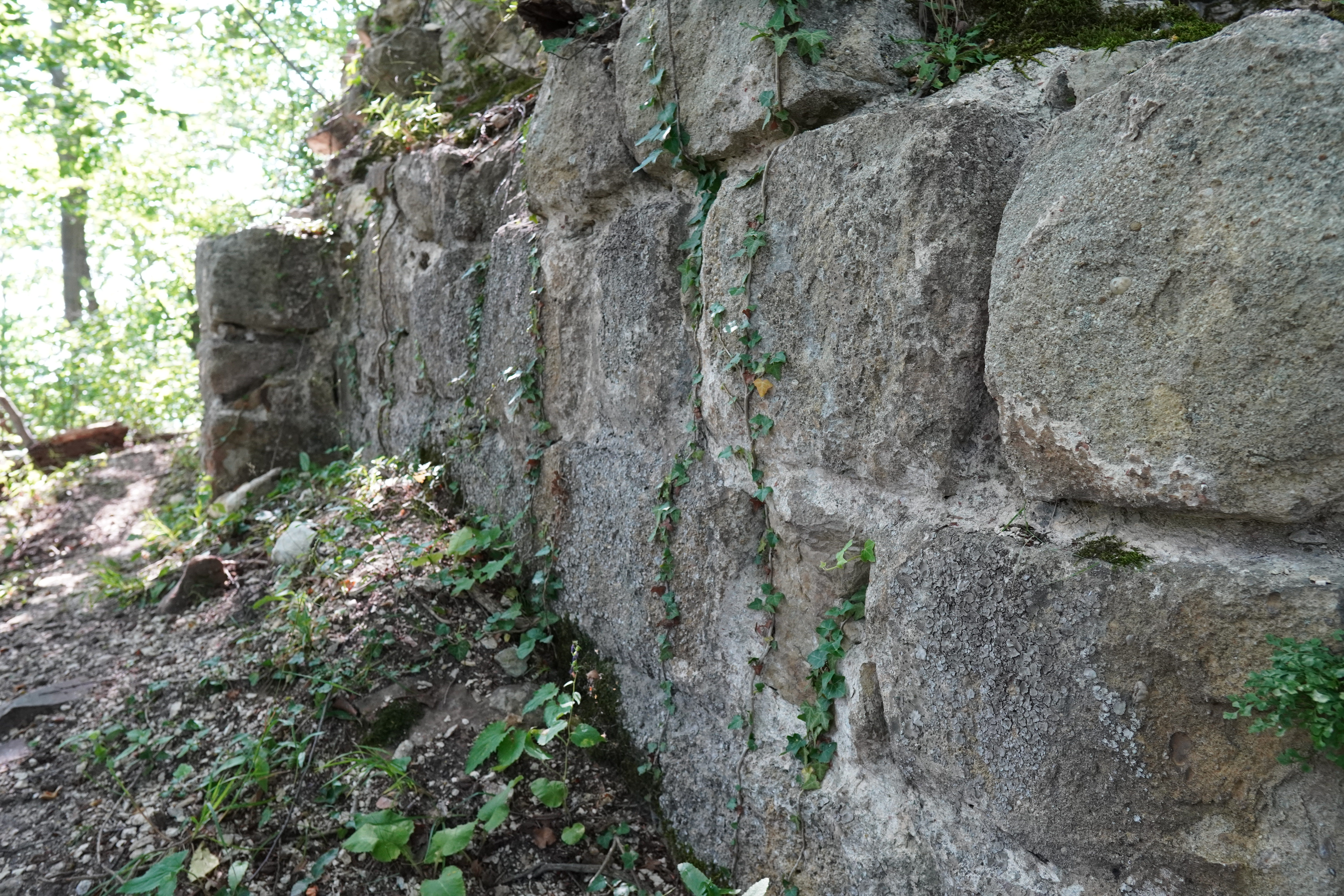
