= Hisar Kapia =

- Хисар Капия (Bulgarian)
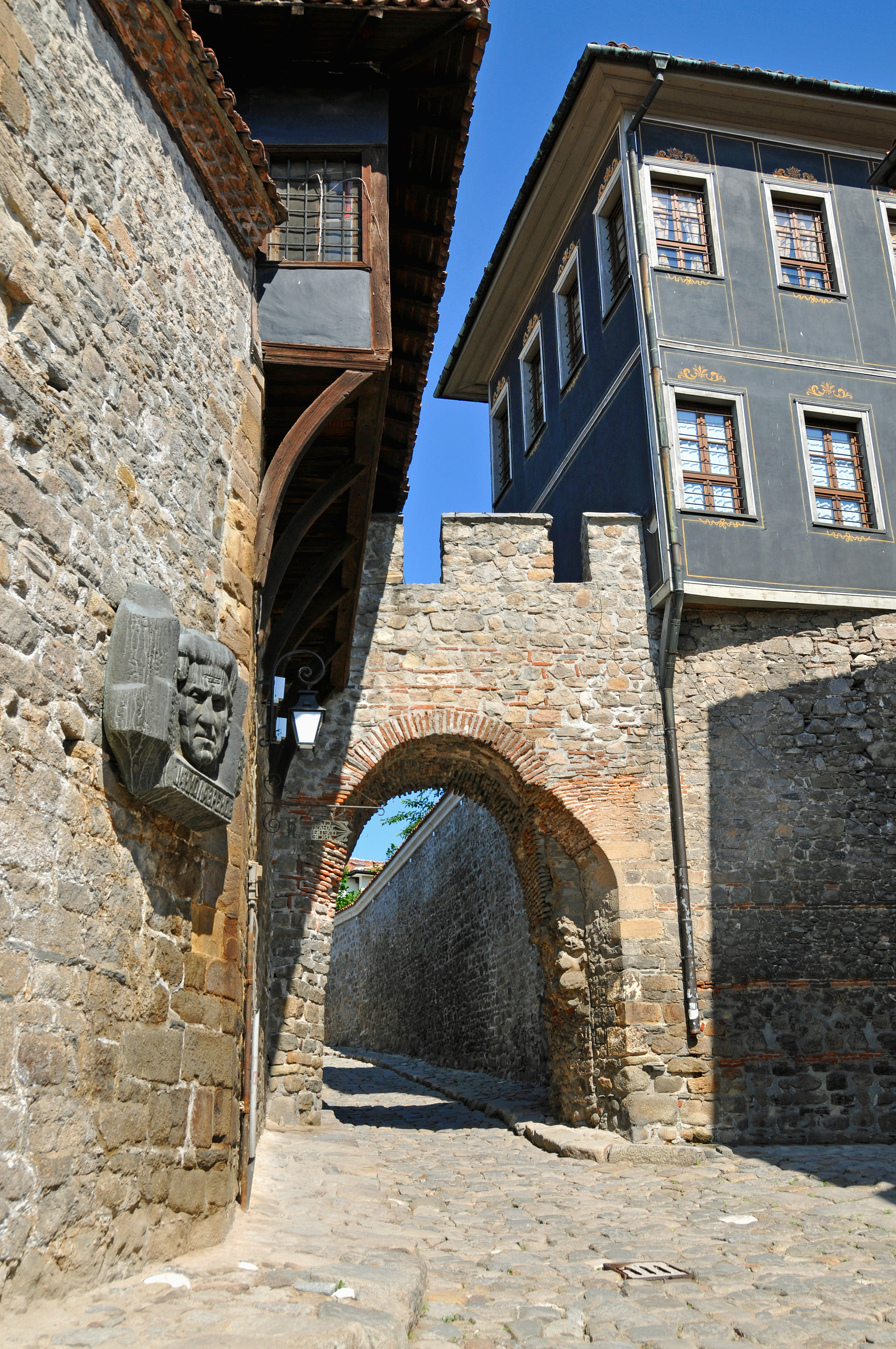

- Location within Plovdiv Old Town
- 42.149783°N 24.753148°E
- Type: Gate
- Periods: Middle Ages
- Location: Plovdiv, Bulgaria

History
- Built: 11th century AD

Hisar Kapia (from Turkish: Hisar Kapı meaning "Castle Gate") is a medieval gate in Plovdiv's old town and one of the most famous tourist sights in the city. The gate was built in the 11th century AD over the foundations of a gate from Roman times (probably from the 2nd century AD). Hisar Kapia is one of the three entrances (Eastern, Northern and Southern) to the acropolis of ancient Plovdiv. During the rule of the Ottoman Empire revival houses were embedded in the remains of the old stone walls around the gate.

== History ==
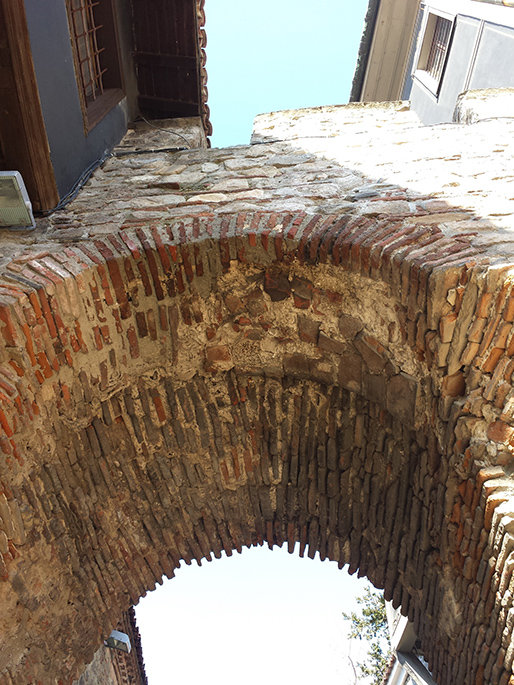
The arch and the construction technique

The first gate on this place was built in the 2nd century AD. In the 6th century during the rule of Justinian the fortification system of the ancient town was expanded and the gate was strengthened. Archeologist suggest that only the foundations of the ancient Roman gate were preserved. The current structure of Hisar Kapia was formed in the Middle Ages (13th - 14th century AD). A construction technique typical from the Second Bulgarian Empire is visible over the arch: a masonry of stones and brick pieces, filled with white mortar.

The importance of the gate faded after the Ottoman invasion in the 14th century. In the 17th and 18th century the rich merchants of Plovdiv built their houses over the ruins of the fortification walls around Hisar Kapia. Today, the lower levels of those houses represent the remains of the ancient walls. Hisar Kapia was reinforced in the beginning of the 20th century due to its poor condition. Today, the medieval gate is one of the landmarks of Plovdiv

== Gallery ==
Хисар капия

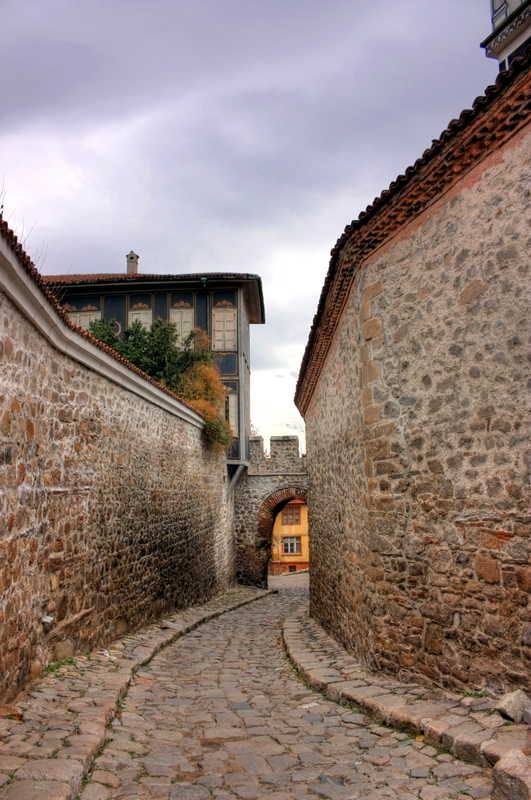

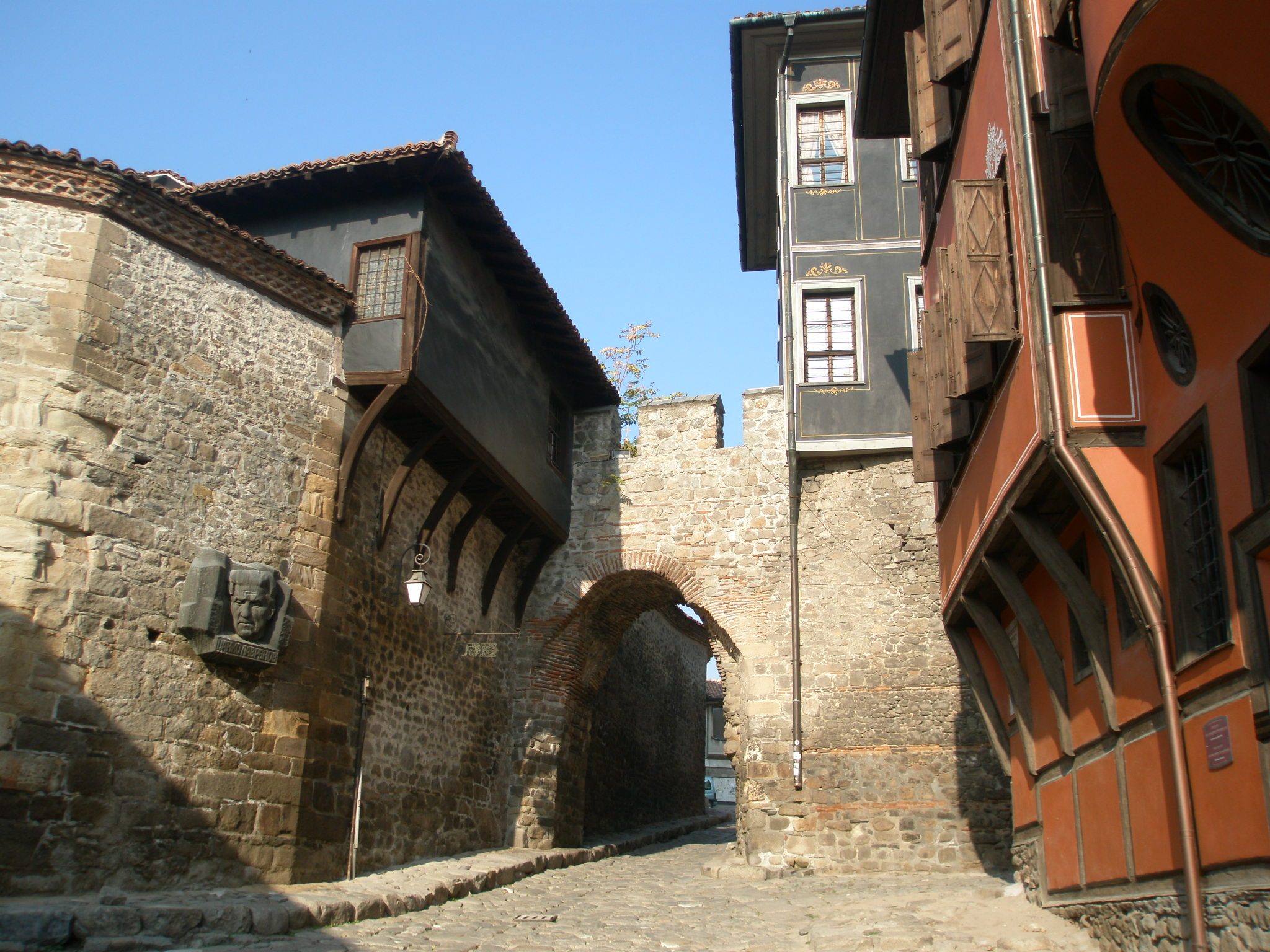

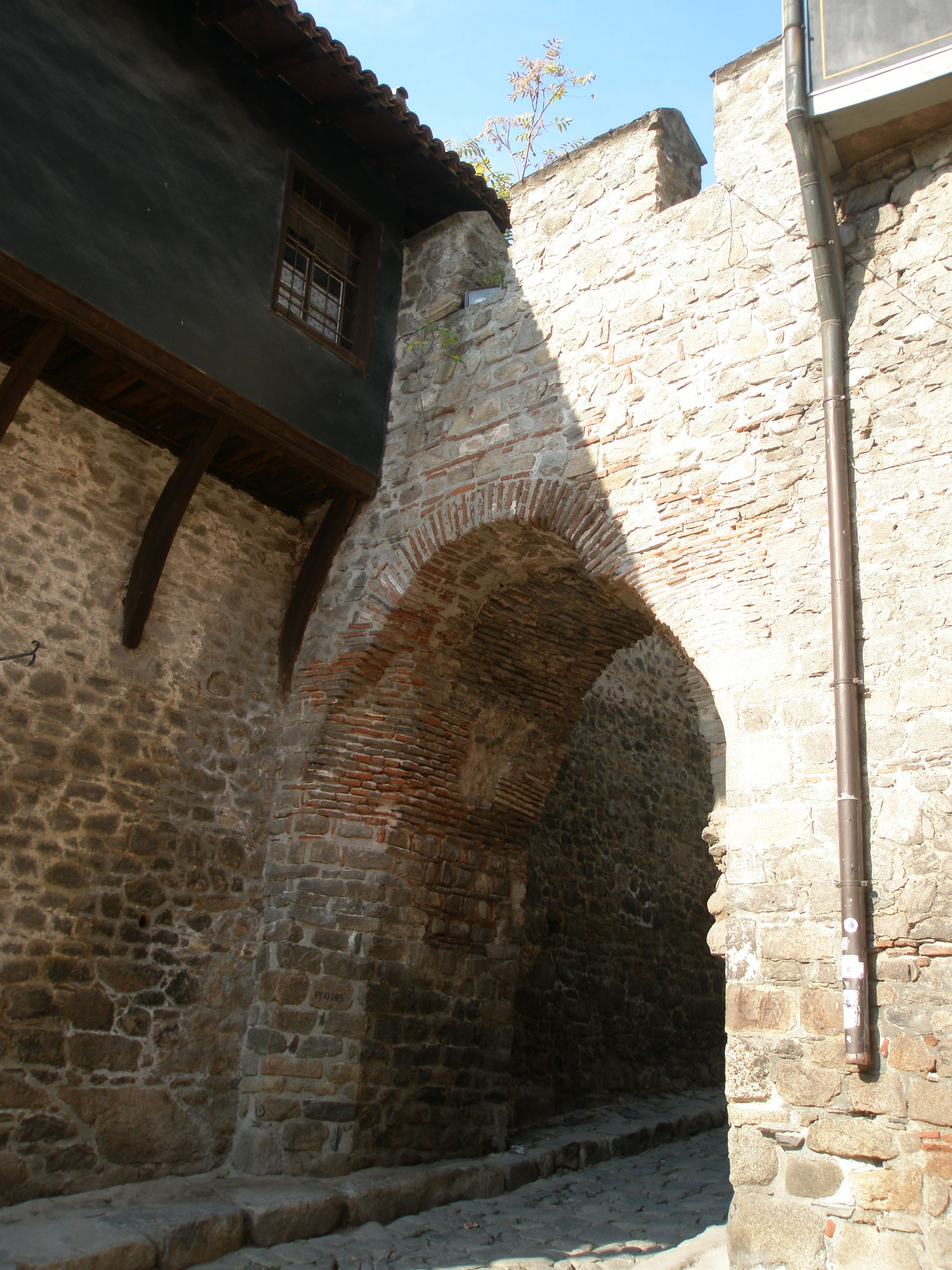

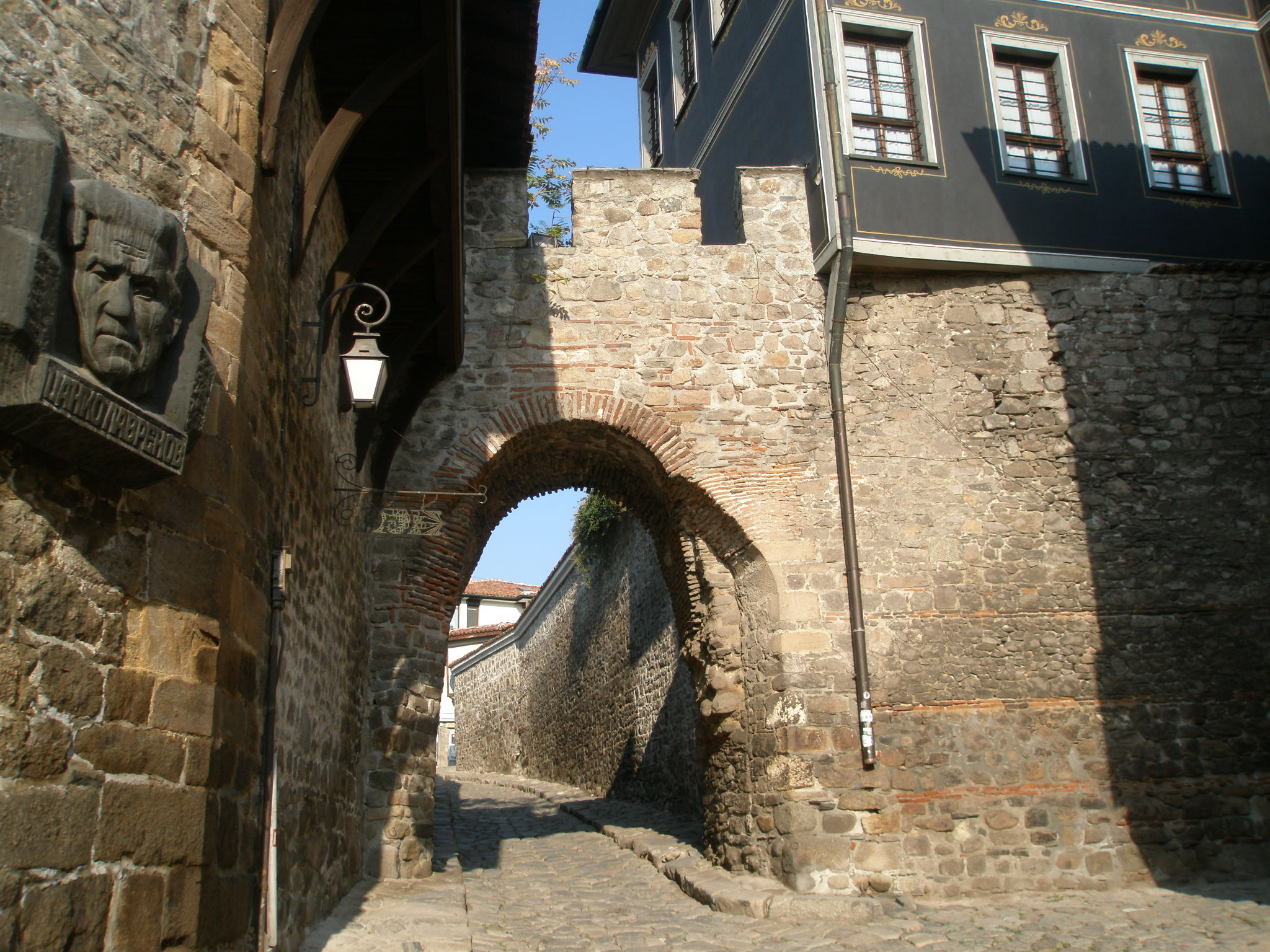

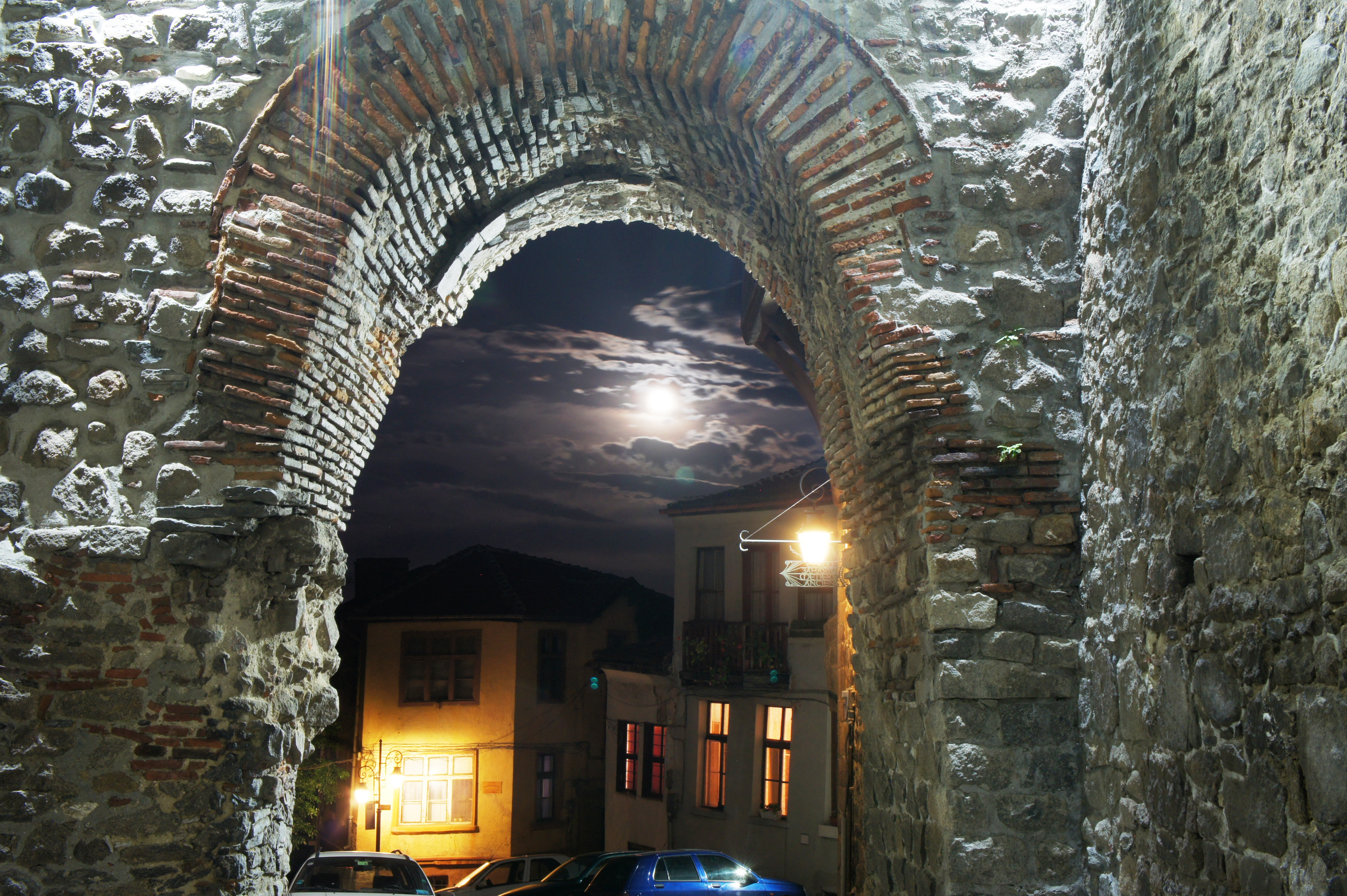

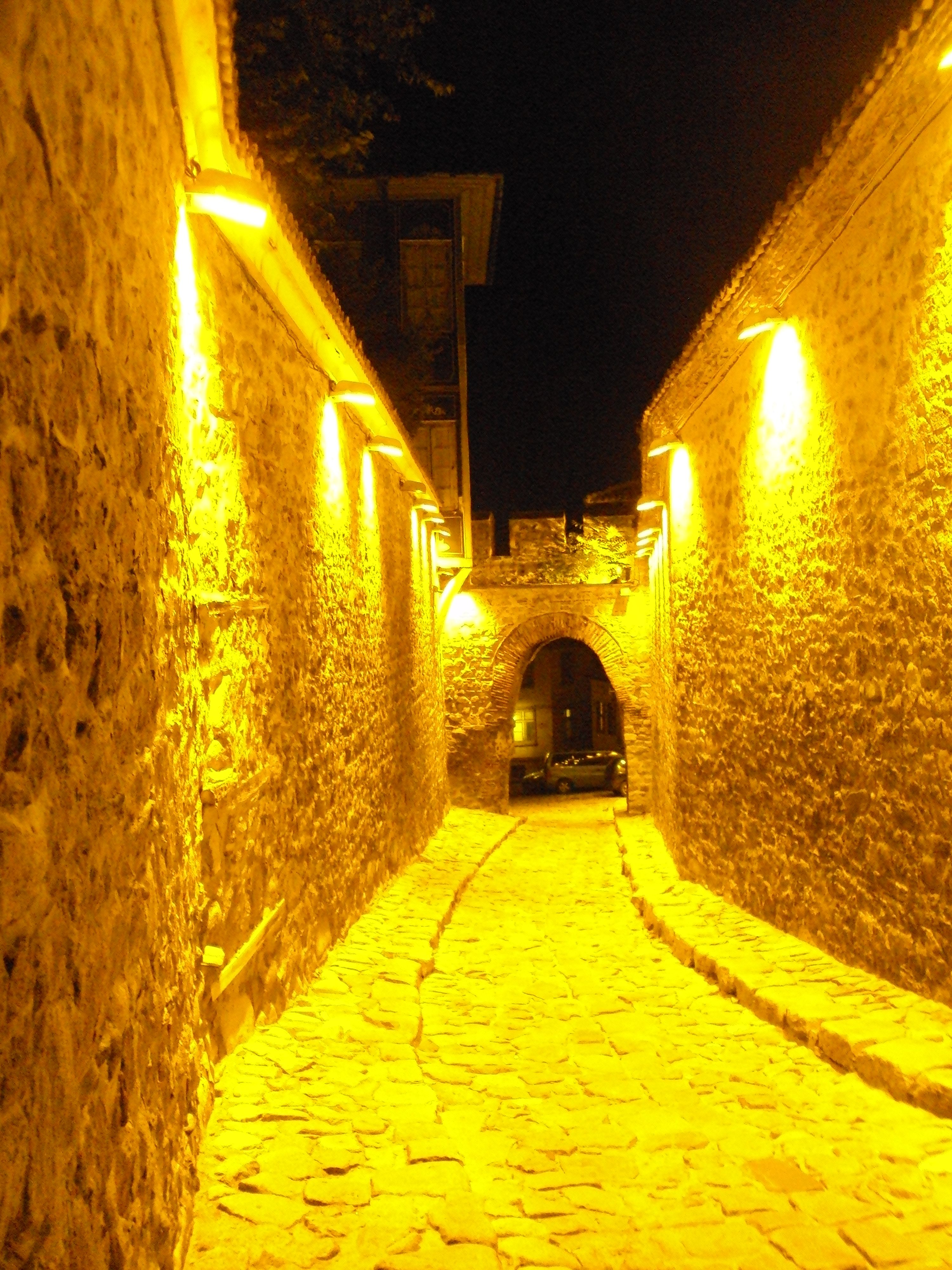
