= Hisarlaka fortress =

Late Antiquity and medieval fortress

Coordinates: 42.2758°N 22.6914°E

Hisarlaka Fortress
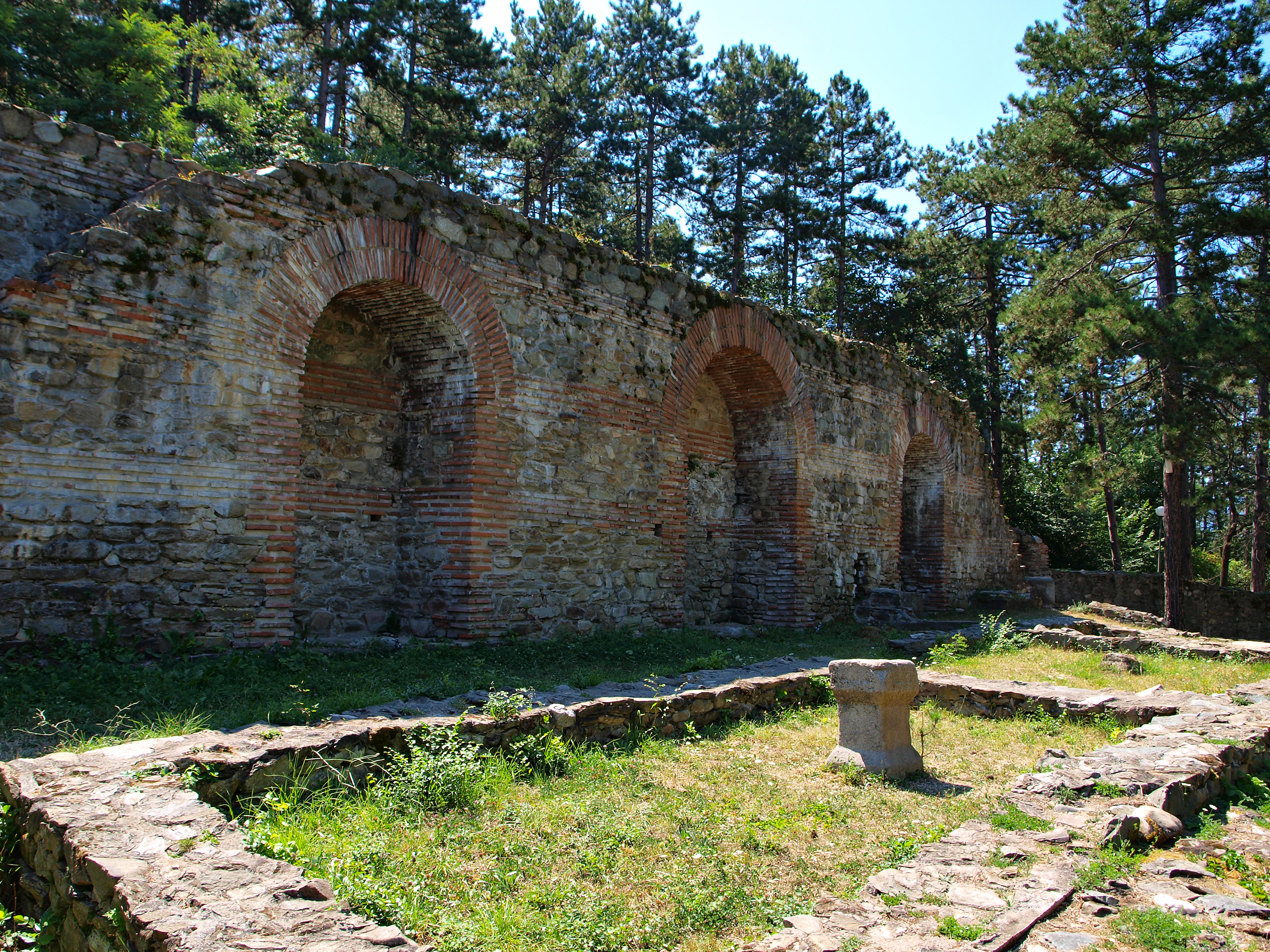
- A curtain wall of the fortress

Site information
- Type: Fortress
- Open to the public: Yes
- Status: Protected Site

Site history
- Built: ca. 400 ad
- Events: Bulgarian-Ottoman Wars

Hisarlaka Fortress is an ancient and medieval fortress occupying a hill at 2 kilometres (1.2 mi) to the south-east of Kyustendil, in what is now Bulgaria. Originally constructed by the Romans around 400 AD, it was among the most important castles of the Bulgarian Empire in the Middle Ages before it was partially destroyed by the Ottomans in the 15th century.

Hisarlaka Fortress was the administrative and religious center of the region from the 5th to the 15th centuries. The expansive fortress was constructed over ten centuries by different rulers.

== Description ==
The fortress is in the shape of an irregular polygon, it is 117 meters wide and 175 meters long. It is mainly protected by its large walls, which are 10 meters high and 1.6 to 3 meters thick. Along the walls there are approximately 14 towers, most are around 12 meters high. The towers are not uniform, there are both round and rectangular towers, and some more irregular ones too. Two gates and five secret entrances lead to the inside of the fortress.

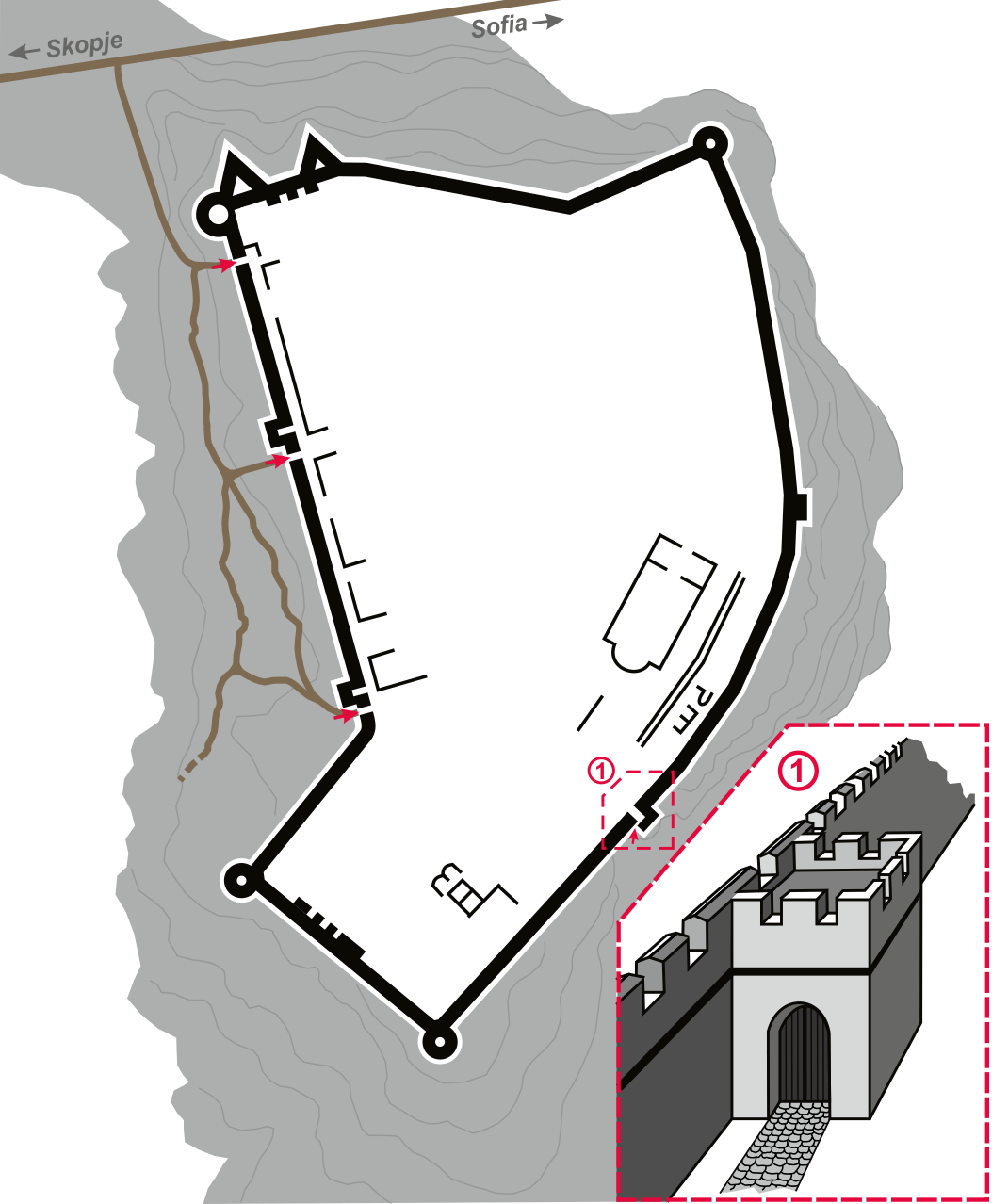
Plan of the fortress

The Roman walls of the fortress were built with the Roman technique "opus mixtum". They were erected using both stone and brick, while powdered brick mortar was used to bind them together.

== History ==
The fortress has been destroyed three times – first by the Huns, who destroyed it sometime before the rule of Justinian I, who is recorded as restoring it, and a second time about 598–599 AD, when it was destroyed by a group of Avars and Slavs, and finally by forces of the Ottoman Empire in the 15th century, after this attack the fortress was not repaired, leaving it in its current state.

Bulgarians repaired the fortress extensively in the 6th century after it was destroyed by the Avars and Slavs. The region of Kyustendil, in which the fortress lies, was integrated into the First Bulgarian Empire around 705AD, which was populated mainly by Slavs and had been given to the Khan of Bulgaria, Tervel according to his contract with the Byzantine emperor Justinian II. It remained in use during the time of the Second Bulgarian Empire, serving as in important stronghold in the region.

In the 15th century, forces of the Ottoman Empire partially destroyed and captured the fortress, marking the end of the fortress' use.

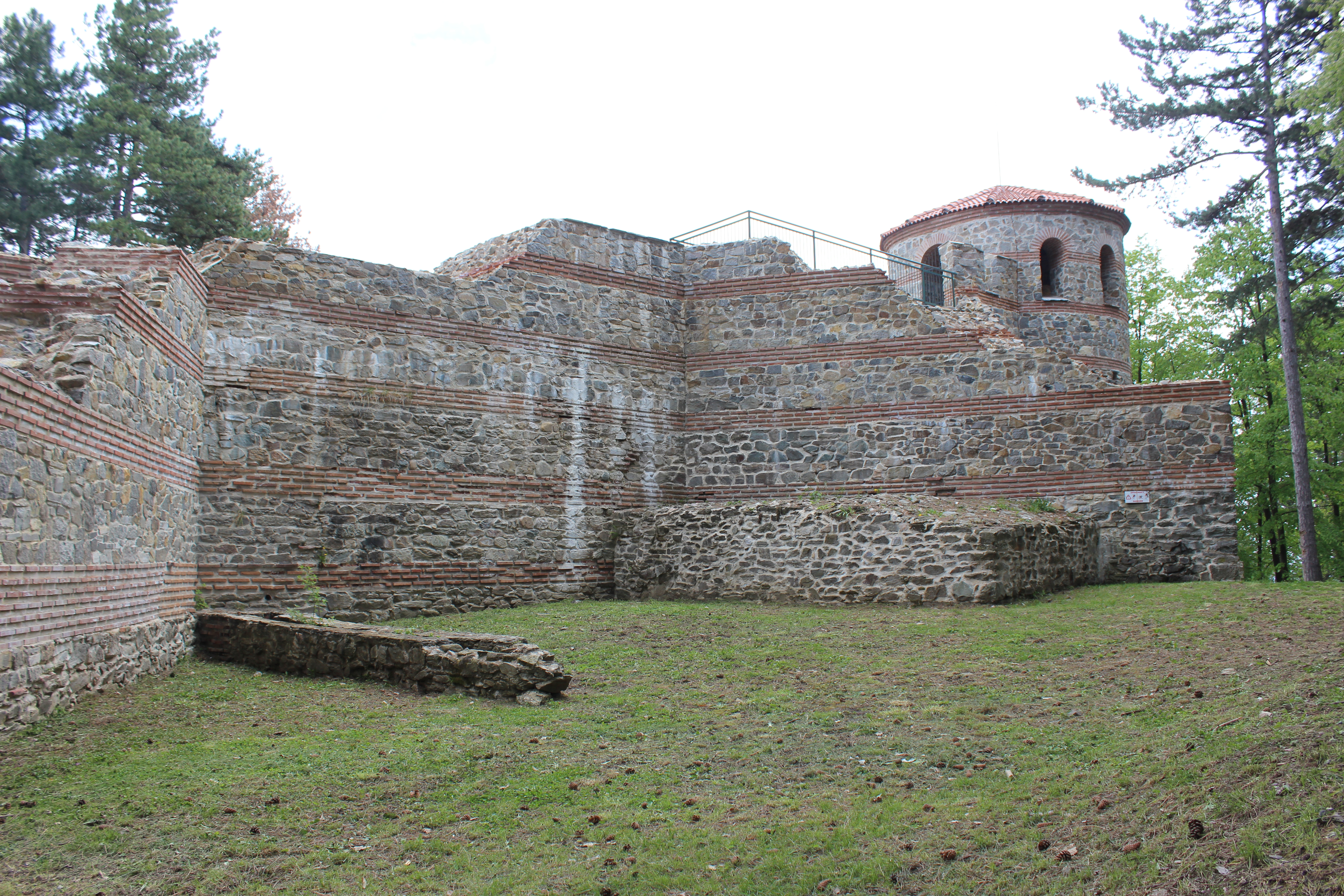
The fortress
