= Eastern gate of Philippopolis =

Eastern Gate of Philippopolis
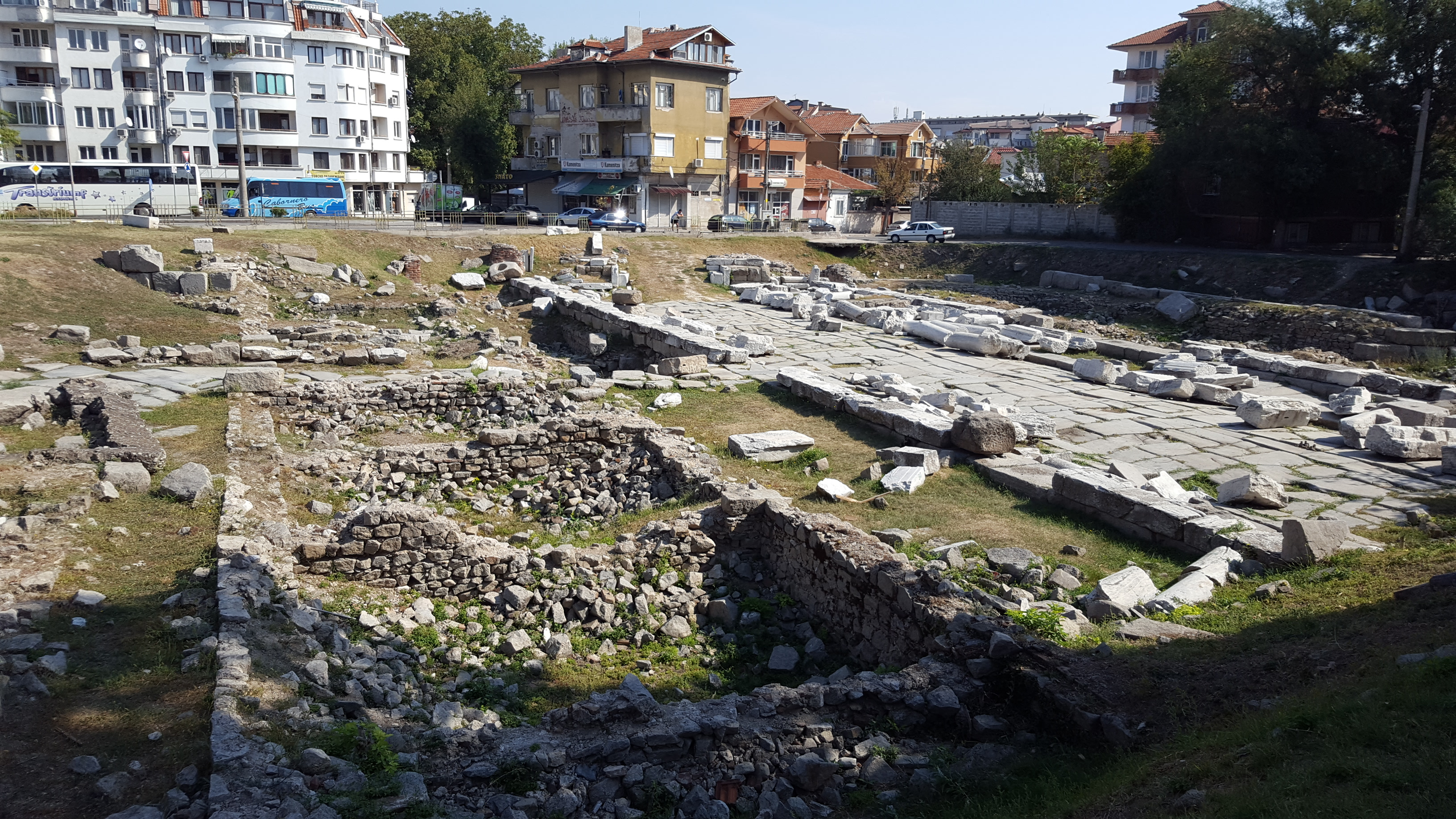

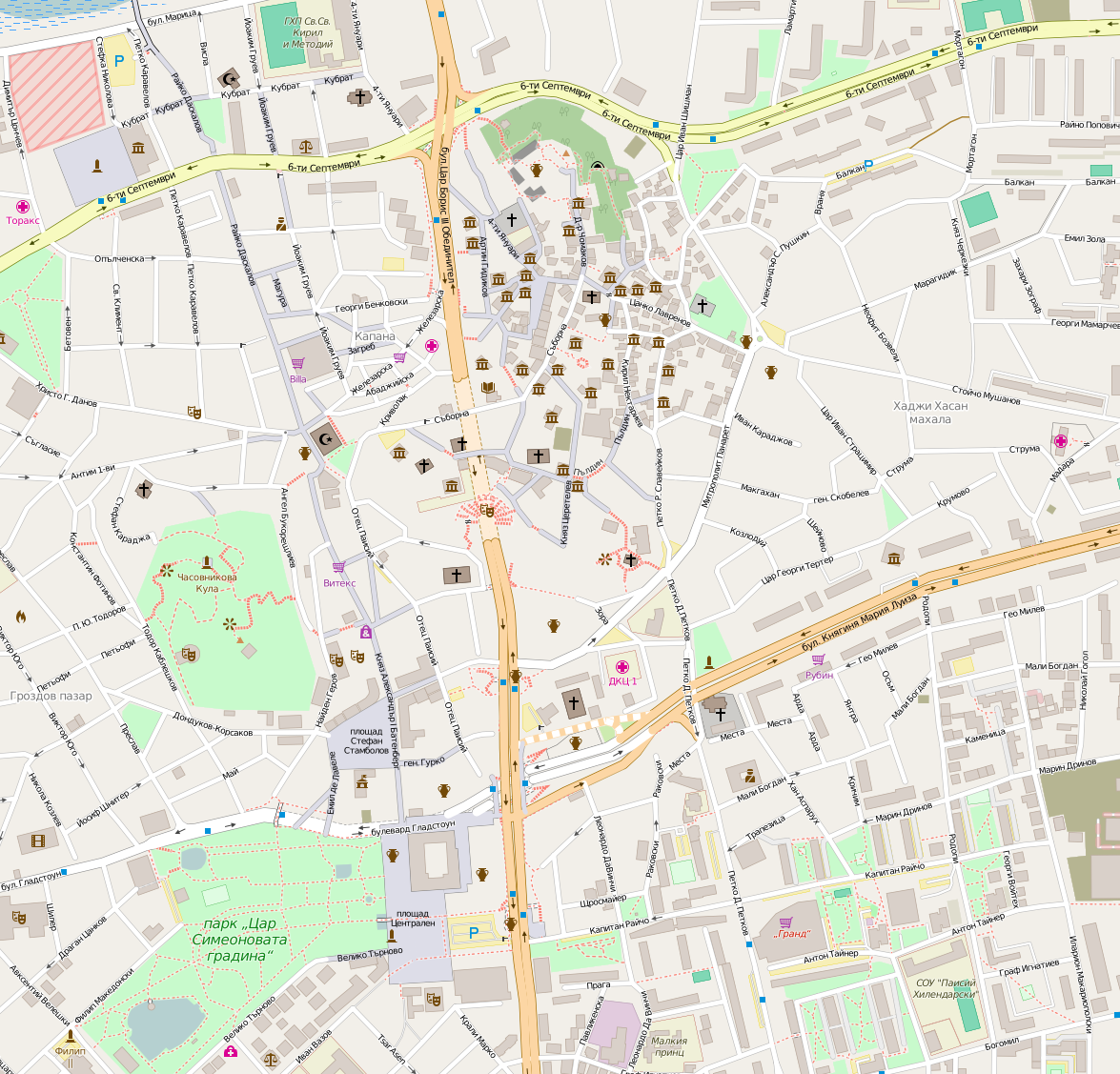
- Location within Plovdiv City Center
- 42.148811°N 24.755862°E
- Type: Gate
- Periods: Antiquity
- Location: Plovdiv, Bulgaria

History
- Built: 2-4th century AD
- Built by: Hadrian

Site notes
- Excavation dates: 1970s

The Eastern gate of Philippopolis is one of the three known entrances to the ancient Thracian city of Philippopolis, the location of the modern city of Plovdiv in Bulgaria. The gate was built on the main road to Byzantium and the Bosphorus. Initially constructed in the 2nd century AD during the reign of Hadrian, the gate and the complex around it were completely rebuilt in the 4th century, and partially repaired in the 5th century. The Eastern gate was discovered in the 1970s.

== The Gate ==
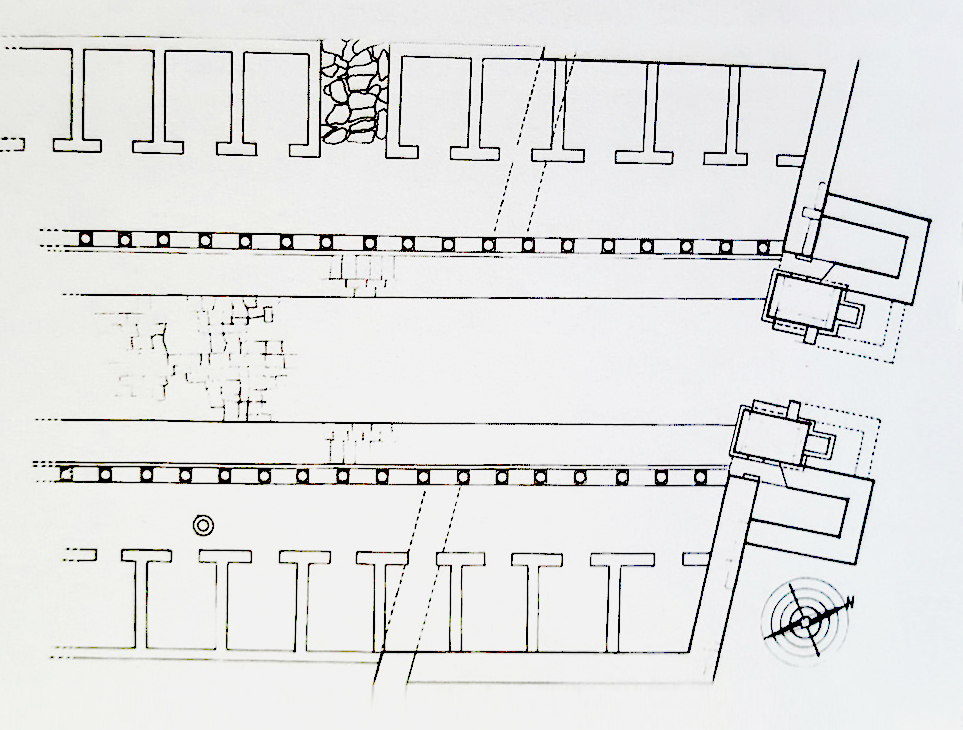
Plan of the complex around the Eastern gate

After it was rebuilt in the 4th century, the Eastern gate of Philippopolis had one wide central entrance and two narrower side entrances. Two watch towers were built on both sides of the gate for protection during attacks. The gate was built on the widest and most elaborate street of the city which was partly discovered during the archeological works. The 13 metres wide street was covered with large syenite slabs with paved sidewalk on both sides (each 2.6 m wide) unlike any other street in Philippopolis. Richly decorated colonnade in the Roman Corinthian order was aligned on both sides of the street. Wheel ruts can be seen on the syenite pavement indicating busy cart traffic through the gate. Buildings built in the 4th century with elaborate porticoes in the Corinthian style were found on both sides of the Eastern gate. It is presumed that they were either barracks or infirmary, but their purpose is still debatable. Together with the Eastern gate they formed an entire complex.

Ruins of the Gate

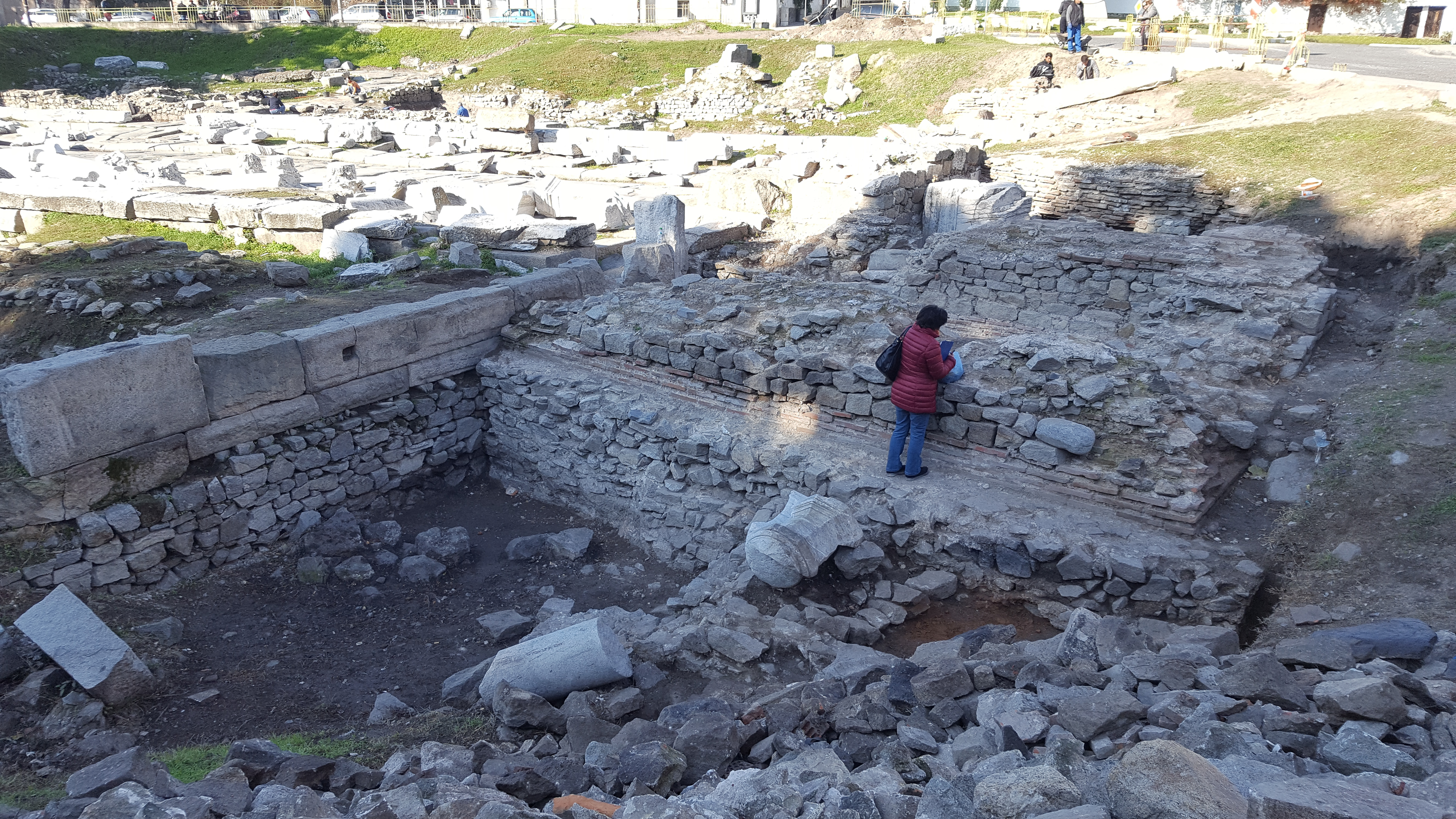

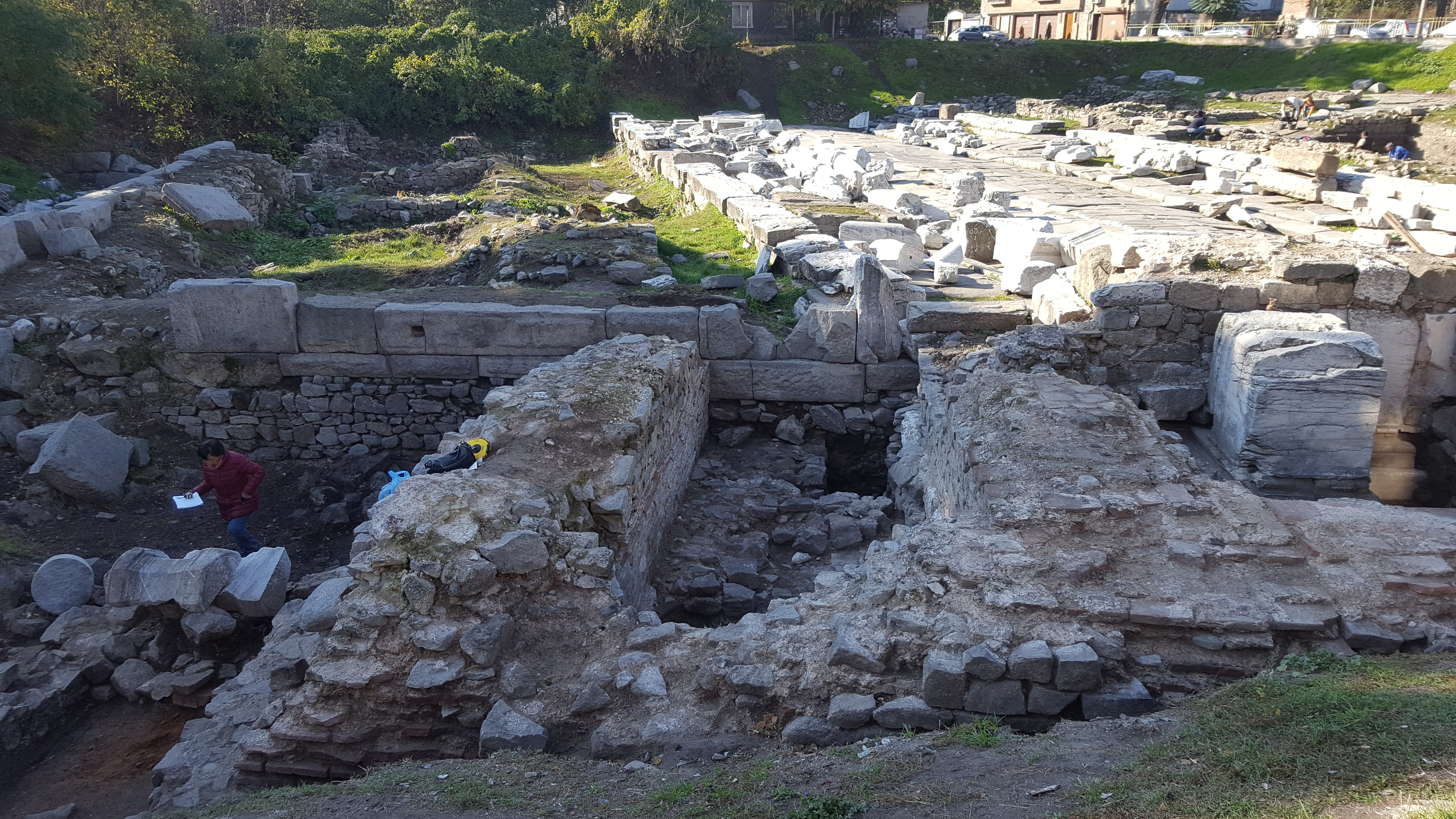

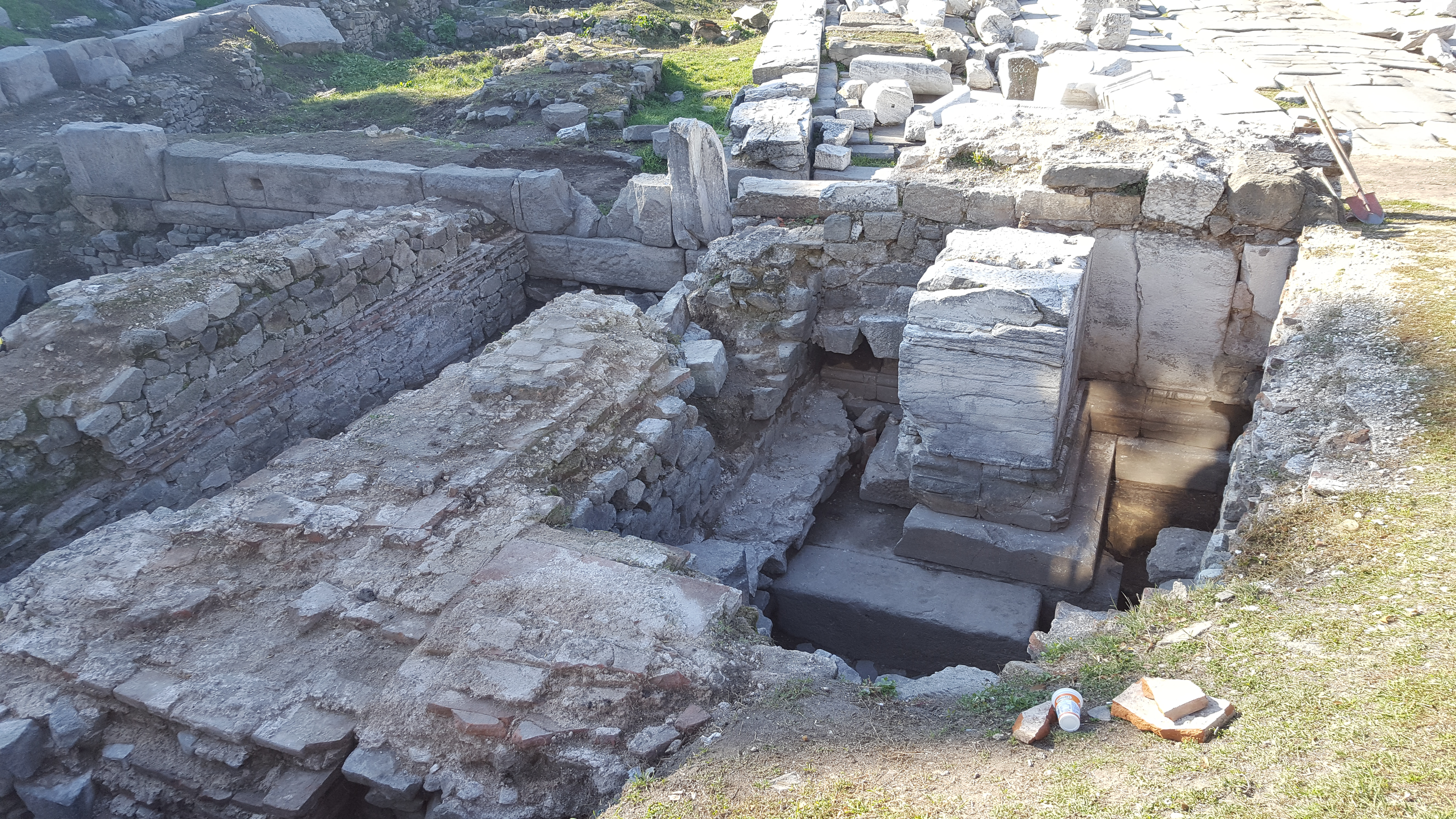

== History ==
The first structure on the place of the today's Eastern gate was a marble triumphal arch built on the main road to Byzantium in the 2nd century for Hadrian's visit in Philippopolis. In 172 Emperor Marcus Aurelius completed the new section of city walls in this area of the city due to the danger of Marcomannic invasion, extending the old walls from around the Three Hills.

The triumphal arch was left a few dozen metres outside the fortified area where the first eastern gate was built. After Philippopolis recovered from the destruction of the Goth invasion in 251, the old walls were renovated using bricks and stone. The new Eastern gate of Philippopolis was built using the remains of Hadrian's arch. The memorial of the imperial visit from the 2nd century became the biggest and the most important entrance of Philippopolis.

== Gallery ==
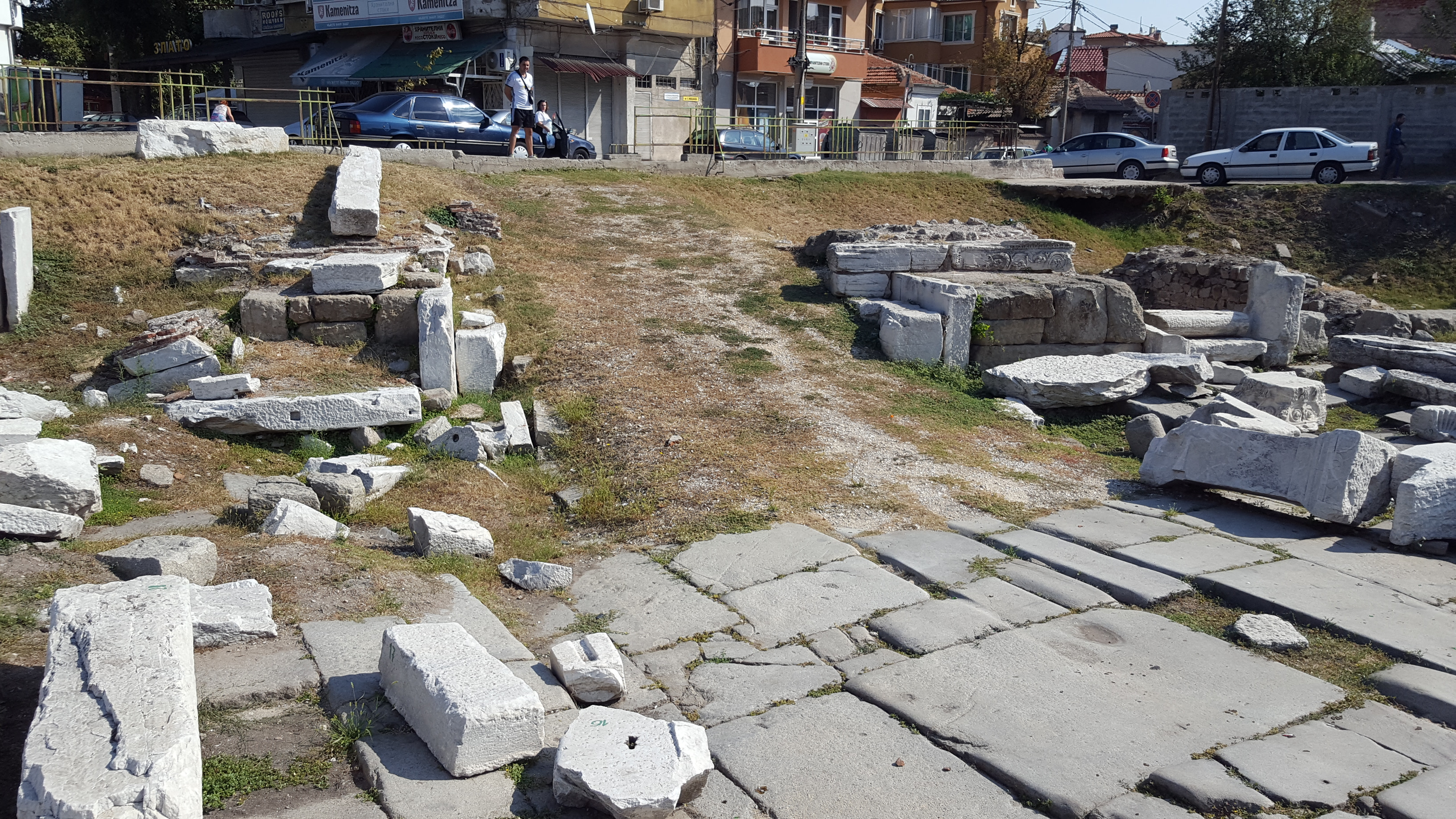
General view of the complex

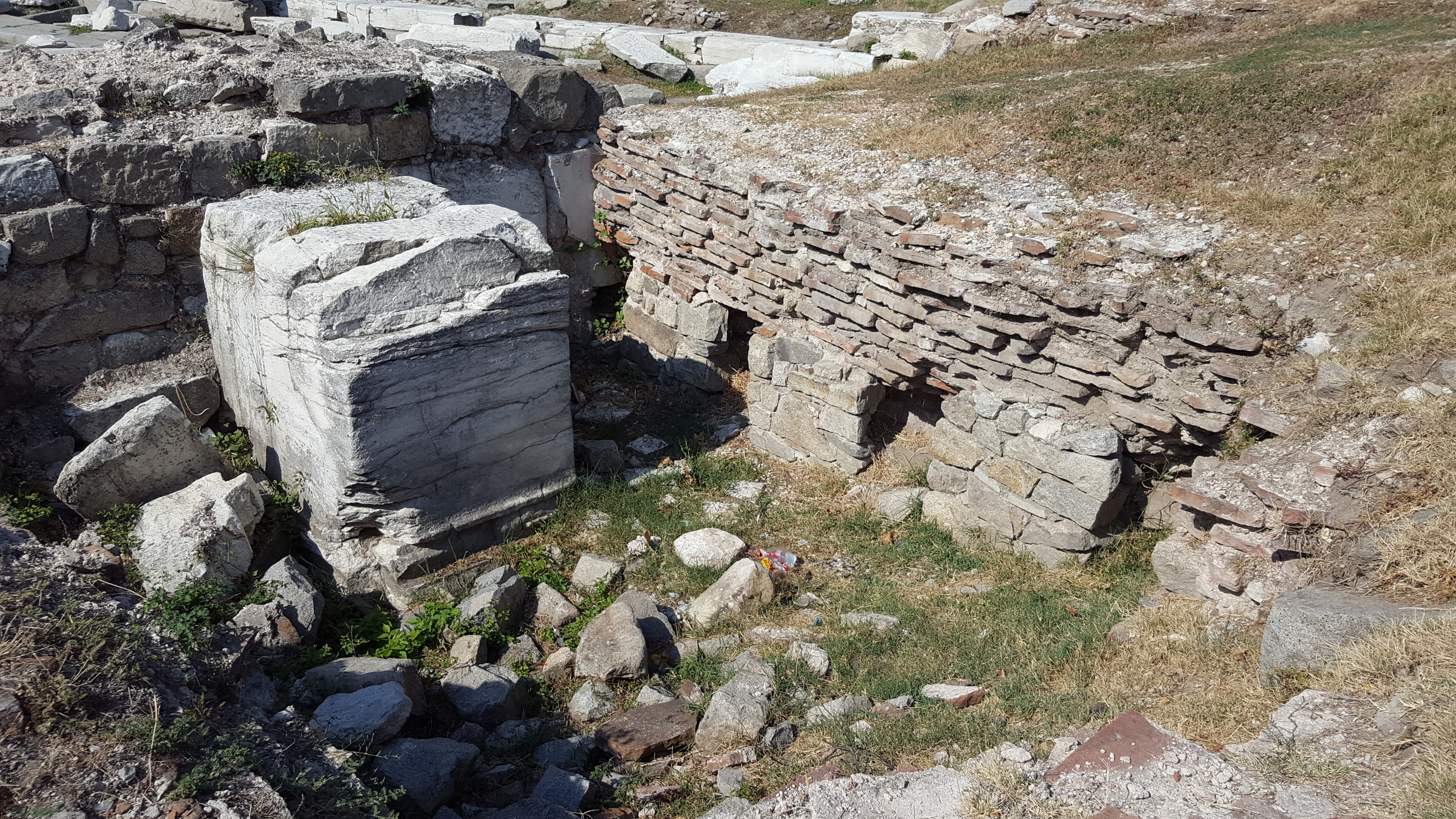
Marble fundament of the gate

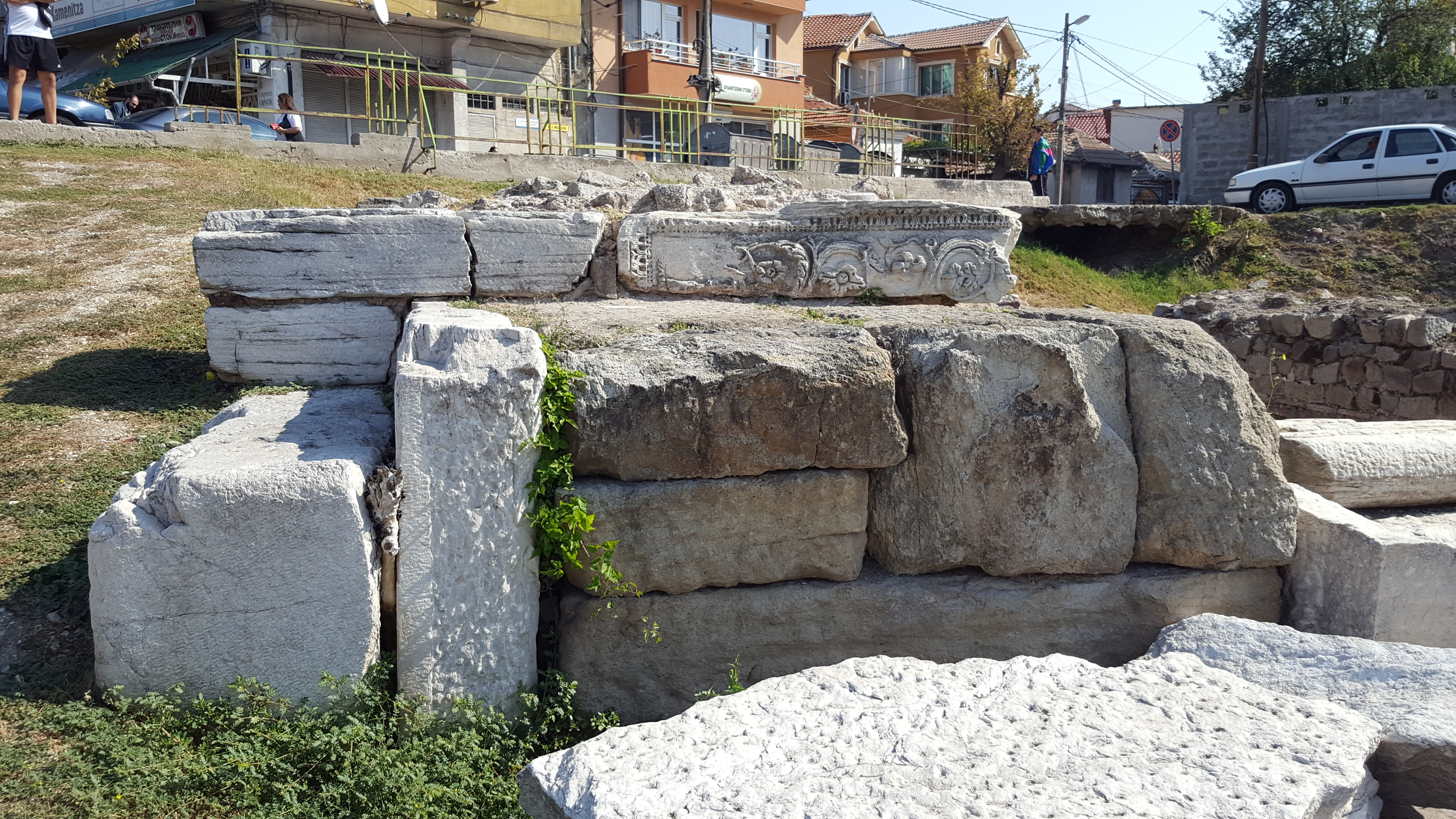
Stone fundament of the gate

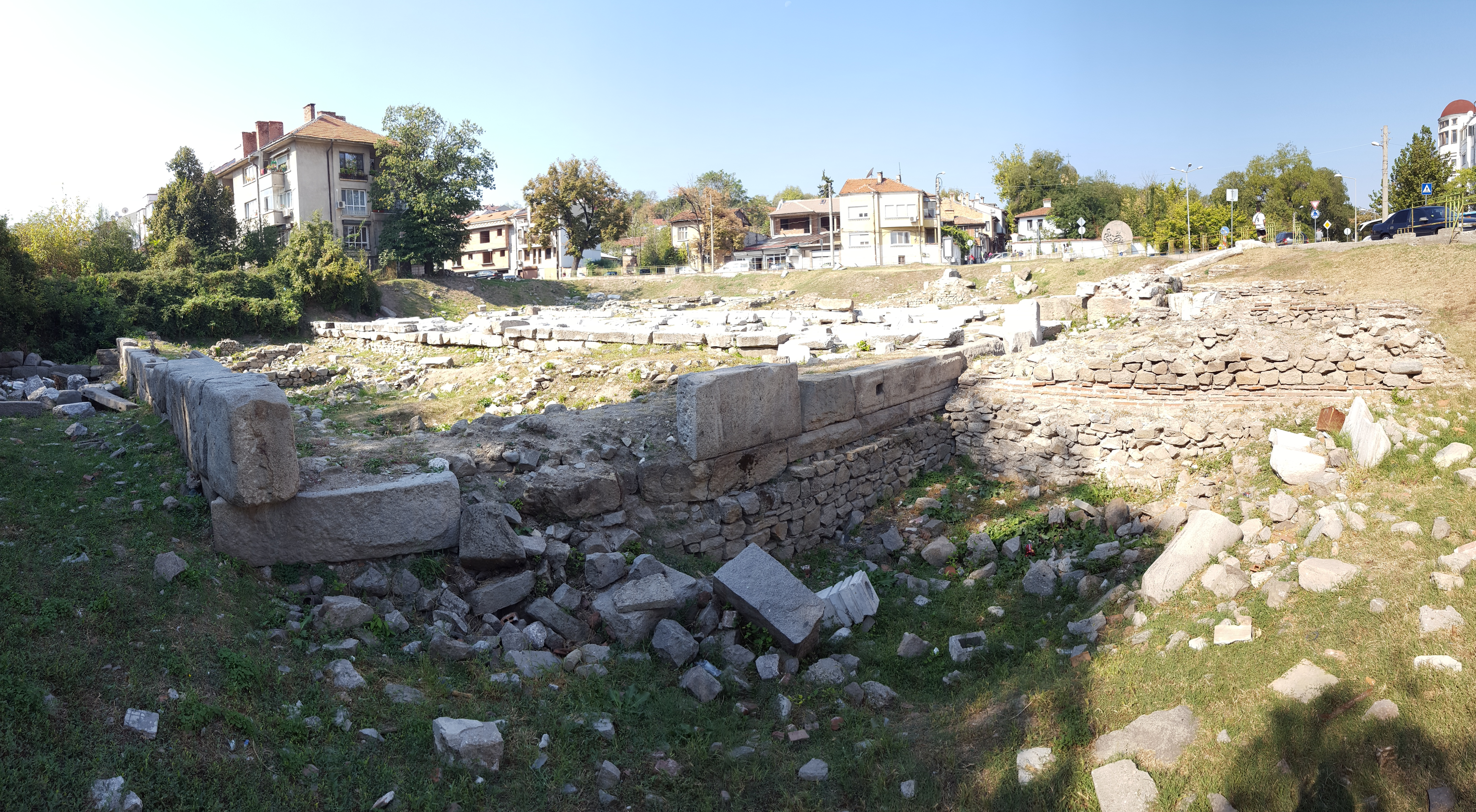
Ruins of the stone walls and the watch towers

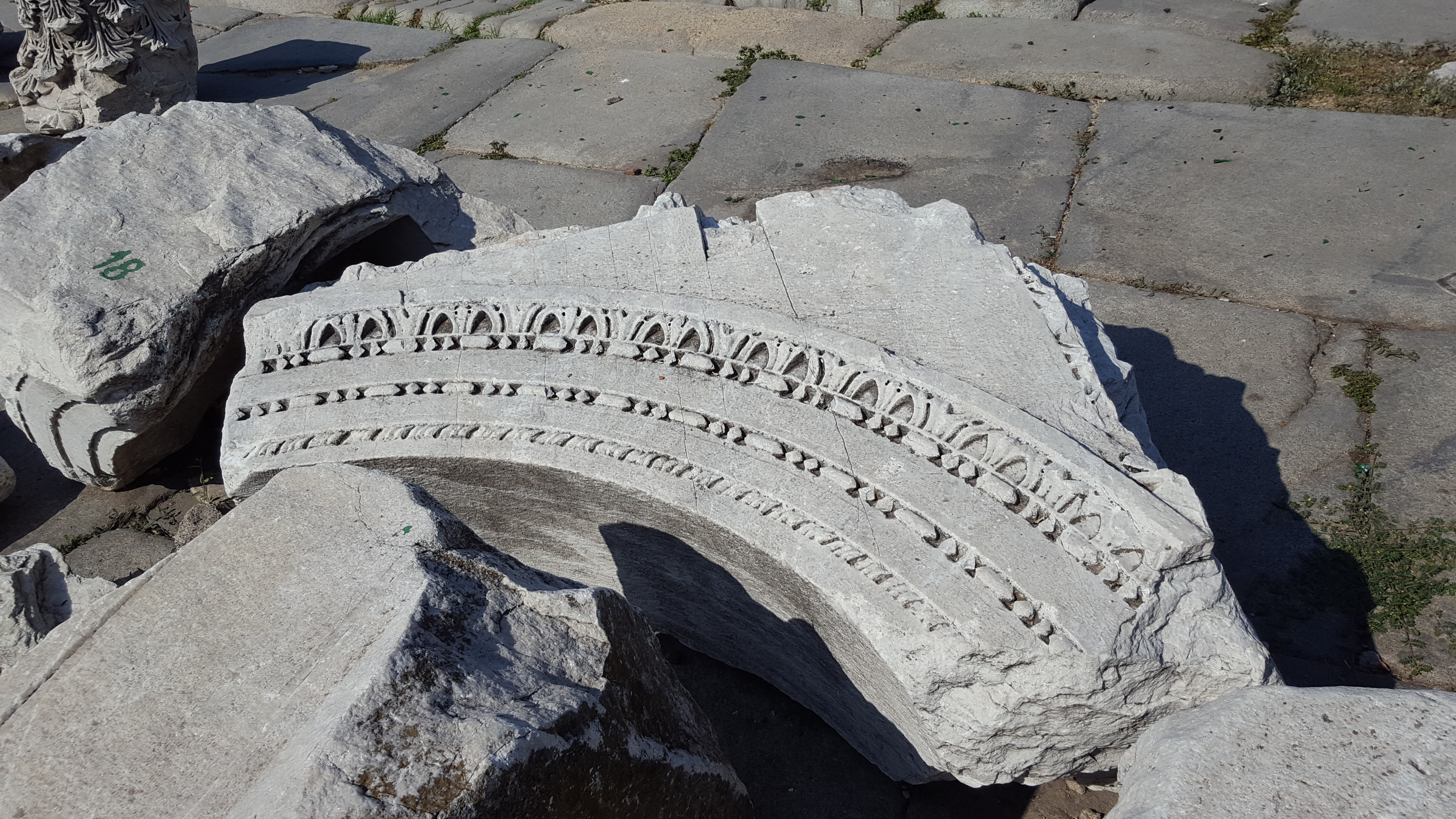
Detail from the arcade

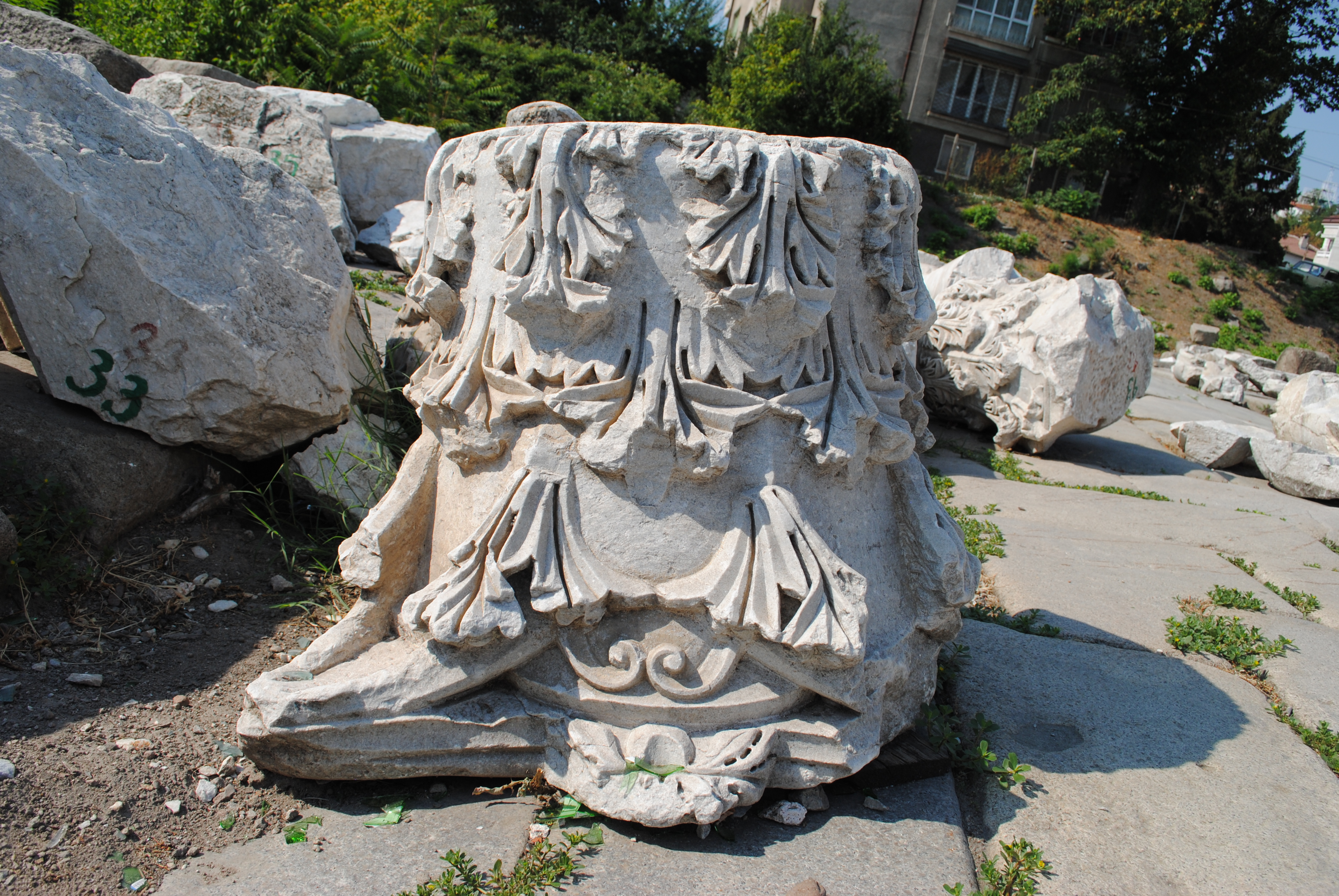
Corinthian capital

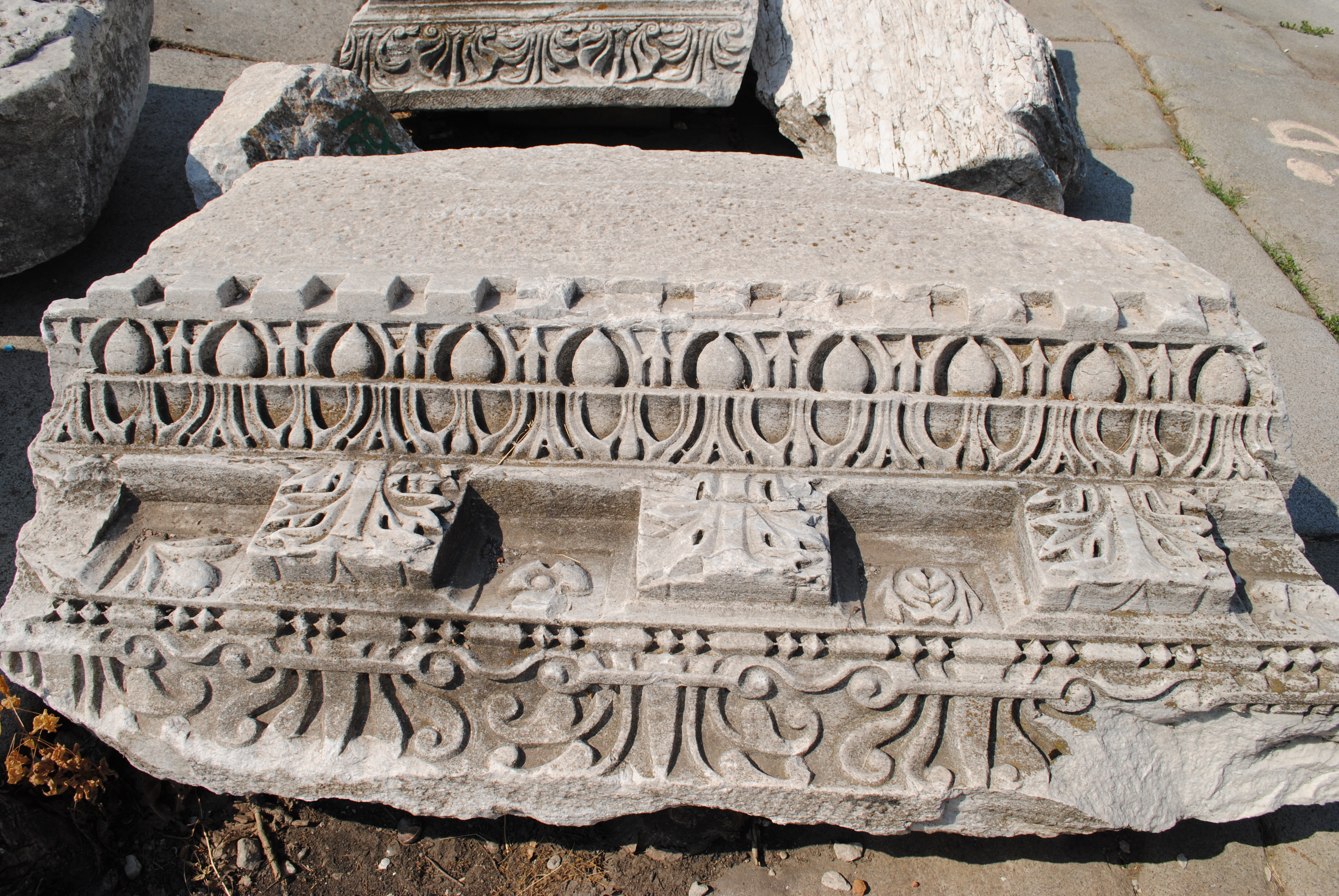
Details from the architrave

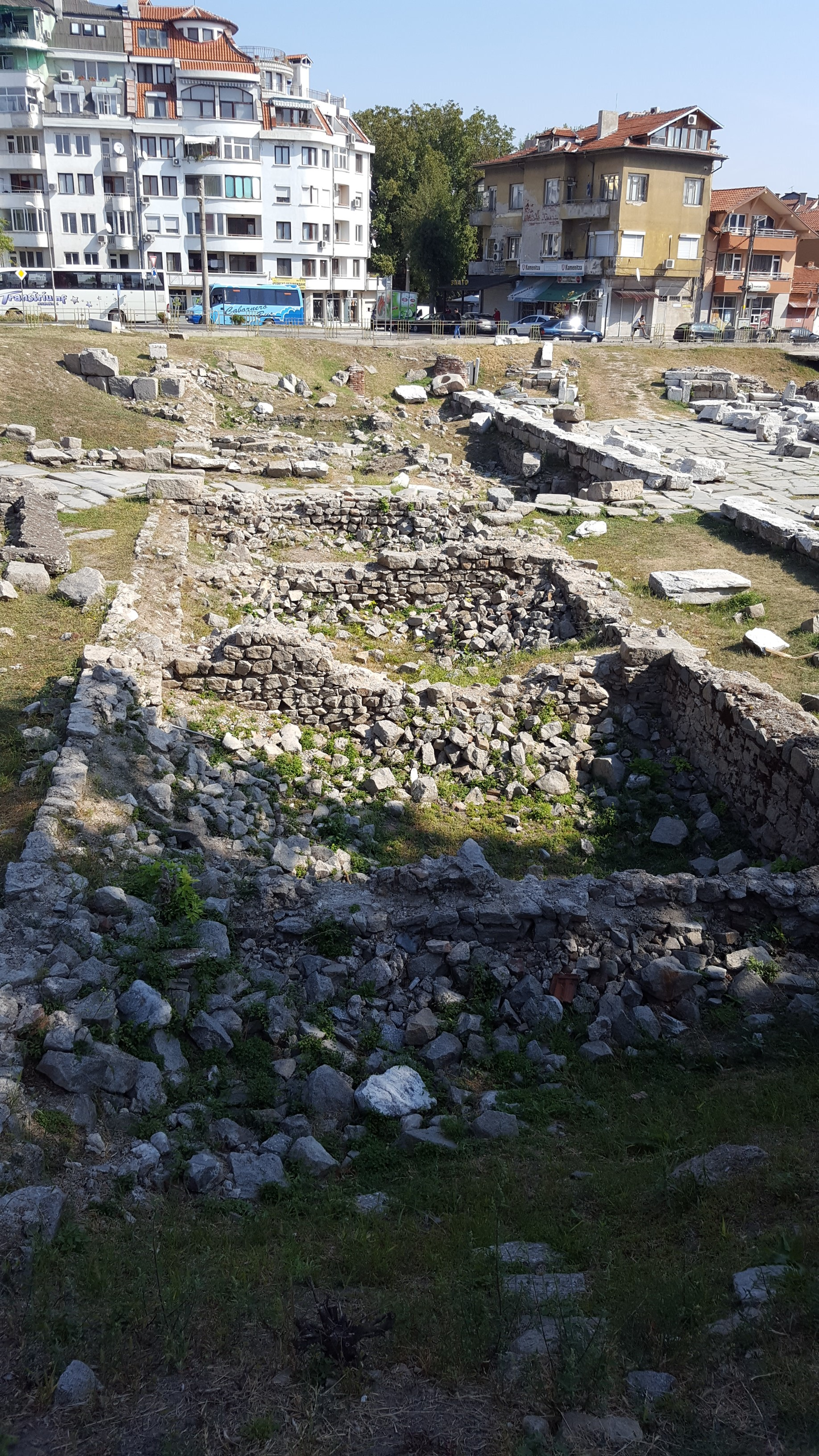
Ruins of the barracks

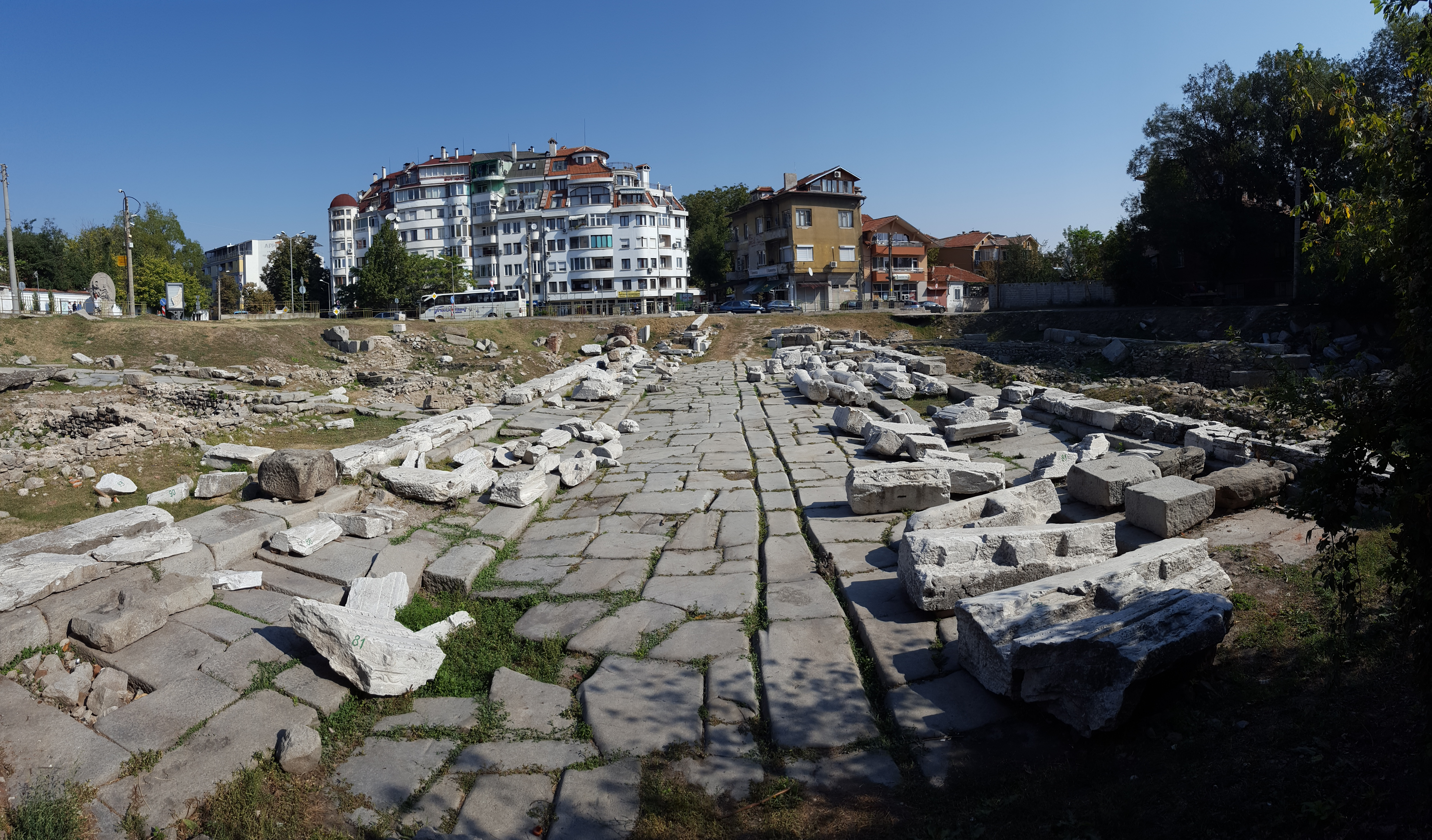
The street leading to the Eastern gate

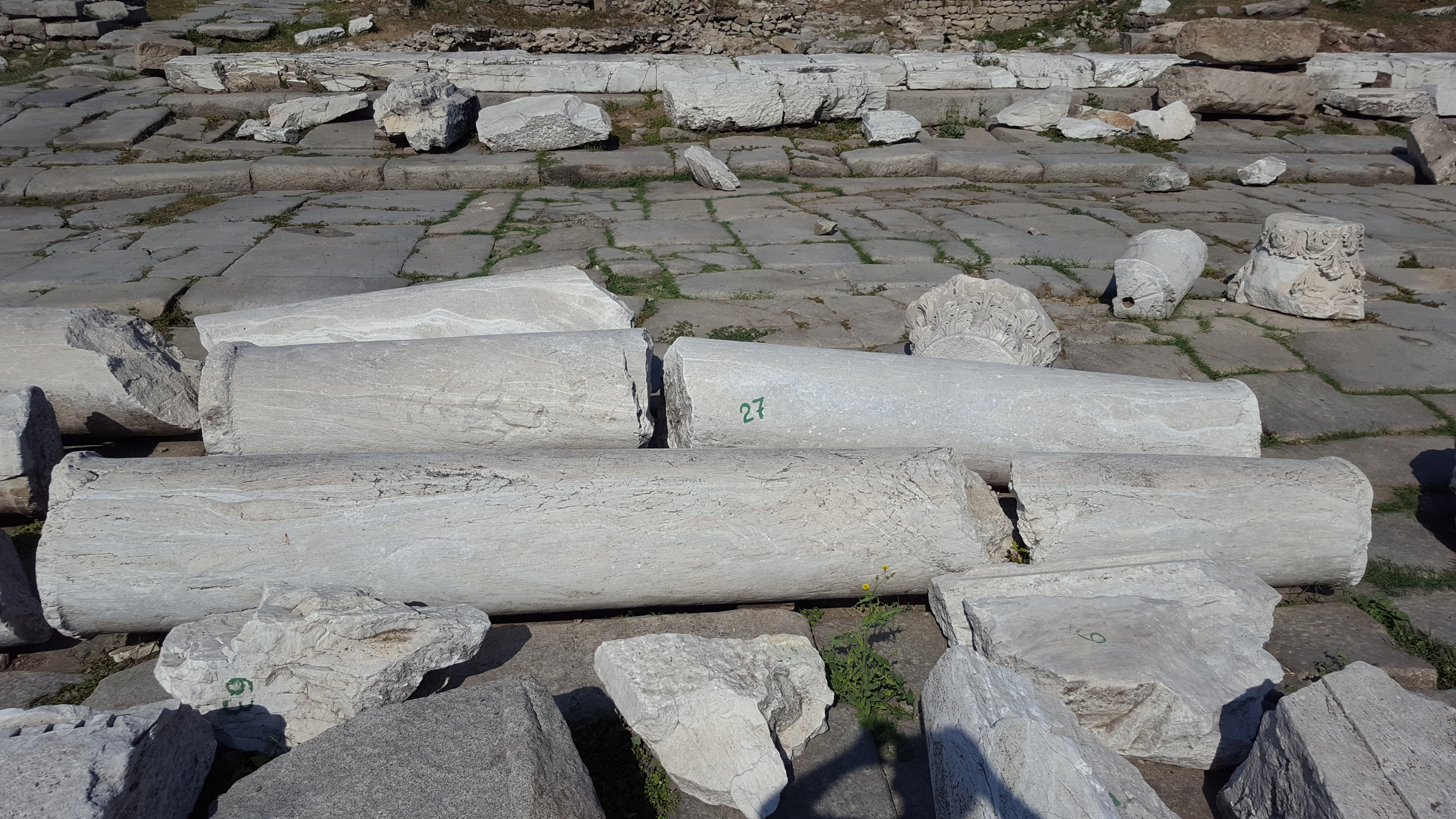
Full size columns
