= Utroba Cave =

Cave in Bulgaria

- The Womb Cave
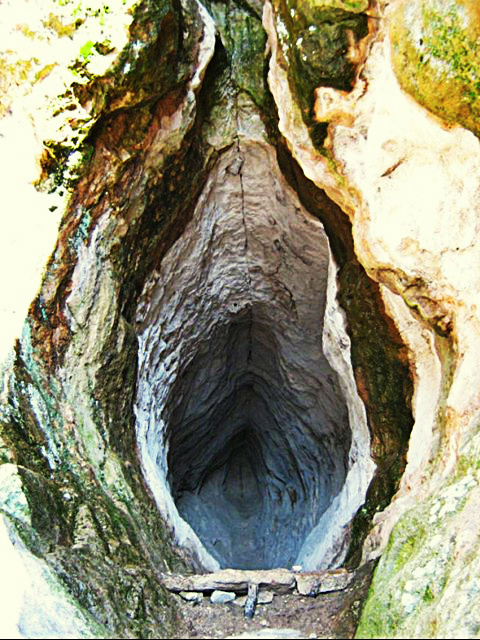
- Womb Cave

- Location within Kardzhali Province Location within Bulgaria
- Coordinates: 41°42′17″N 25°14′53″E

The Utroba Cave, also known as Womb Cave, is an ancient cave sanctuary in Kardzhali Province, Bulgaria. Located in the Eastern Rhodope Mountains near the Ilinitsa village, the cave resembles a human vulva and dates to the Thracian period. Historians believe that it was once used as a fertility shrine.

It is known in Bulgarian as Utrobata (Утробата, Bulgarian pronunciation: [oˈtrɔbɐtɐ], lit. 'The Womb') or Peshtera Utroba (Пещера Утроба, [pɛʃtɛˈra oˈtrɔbɐ], 'Womb Cave').

== History ==
The cave is located 20 kilometers from the city of Kardzhali near the village of Ilinitsa and it dates to 480 BC. It is also referred to as "The Cave Womb" or "Womb Cave" because the entrance is the shape of a vulva. The inside of the cave resembles a uterus. Locally it is also called "The Blaring Rock". Researchers believe that the entrance to the cave was a slit, which was then widened by humans. The entrance to the cave is 3 metres (9.8 ft) tall and 2.50 m (8.2 ft) wide and inside the cave there is a 1.3 m (4.3 ft)-tall altar which has been carved.

Archaeologist Nikolay Ovcharov believes that the cave and altar were used by the Thracians. There are several Thracian sanctuaries found in Bulgaria. Ovcharov believes that it was used as a fertility shrine for the Thracians. The "cult" places of the Thracians are usually located at the top of mountains and they have running water. There is also constantly flowing water at the Utroba Cave, which flows from the cave to the foothills.

There is an opening in the ceiling which allows the light into the cave. The light creates a phallus shape every day at noon, but it only reaches the altar on one day of the year. In the middle of the day at a certain time of year the light which is in the shape of a phallus penetrates deep into the cave all the way to the altar. In February or March the light takes the shape of a phallus and enters a hole at the altar: the light then flickers for 1–2 minutes. The penetrating and flickering light is thought to symbolize fertilization.

Even today, there are childless couples who go to the cave hoping it will help them conceive a child.

== See also ==
- Thracian religion
