= Shiroko pole =

Shiroko pole Широко поле
- Village
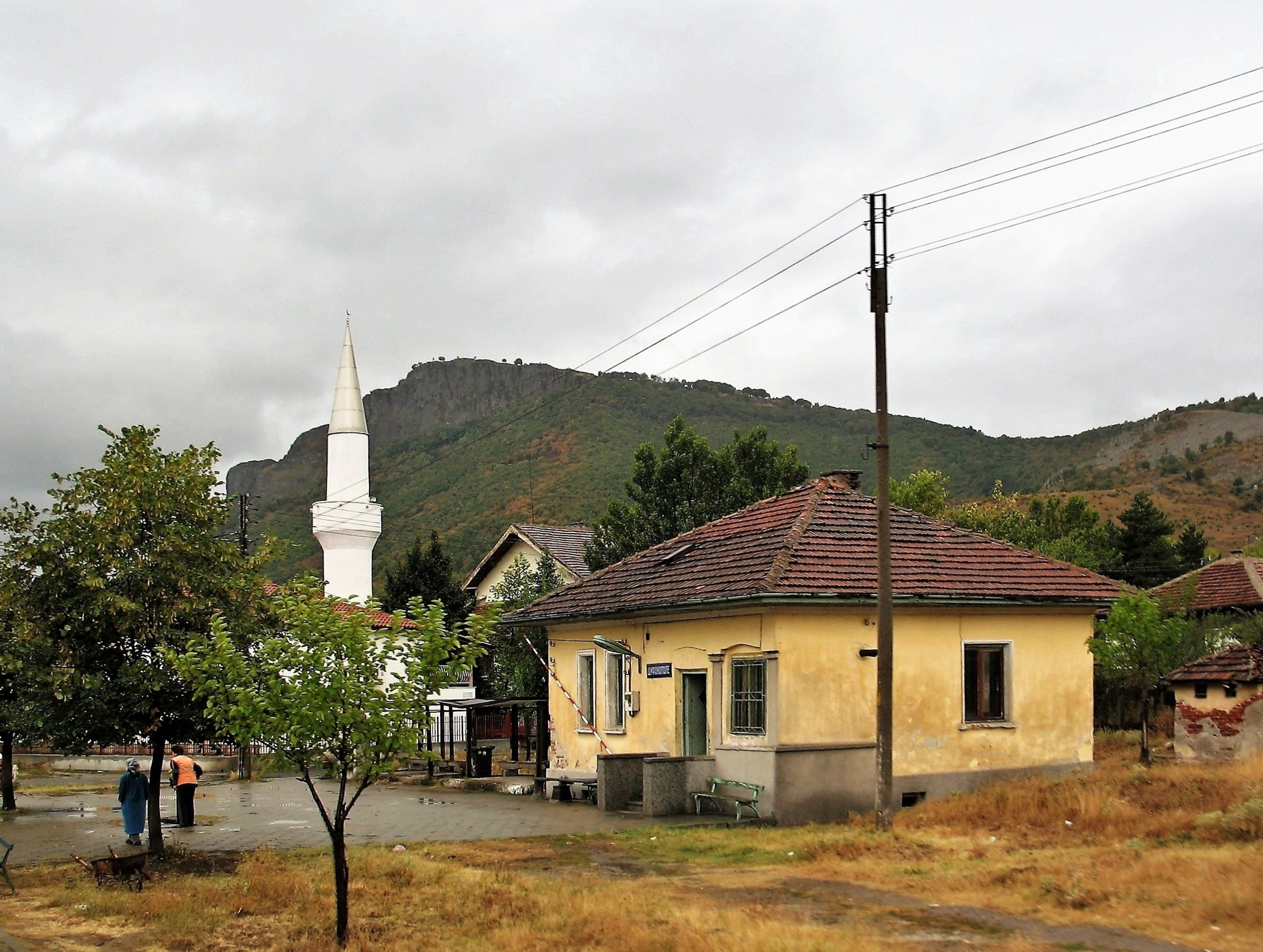
- Train station in Shiroko pole

- Location within Bulgaria
- Coordinates: 41.6333°N 25.4667°E
- Country: Bulgaria
- Province: Kardzhali Province
- Municipality: Kardzhali
- Time zone: UTC+2 (EET)
  - Summer (DST): UTC+3 (EEST)

Shiroko pole (Bulgarian: Широко поле) is a village in Kardzhali Municipality, Kardzhali Province, southern Bulgaria. On the shores of the Studen Kladenets Reservoir of the river Arda south of the village is located the medieval Bulgarian fortress of Monyak.
