= Kardzhali =

Kardzhali Кърджали
- Town
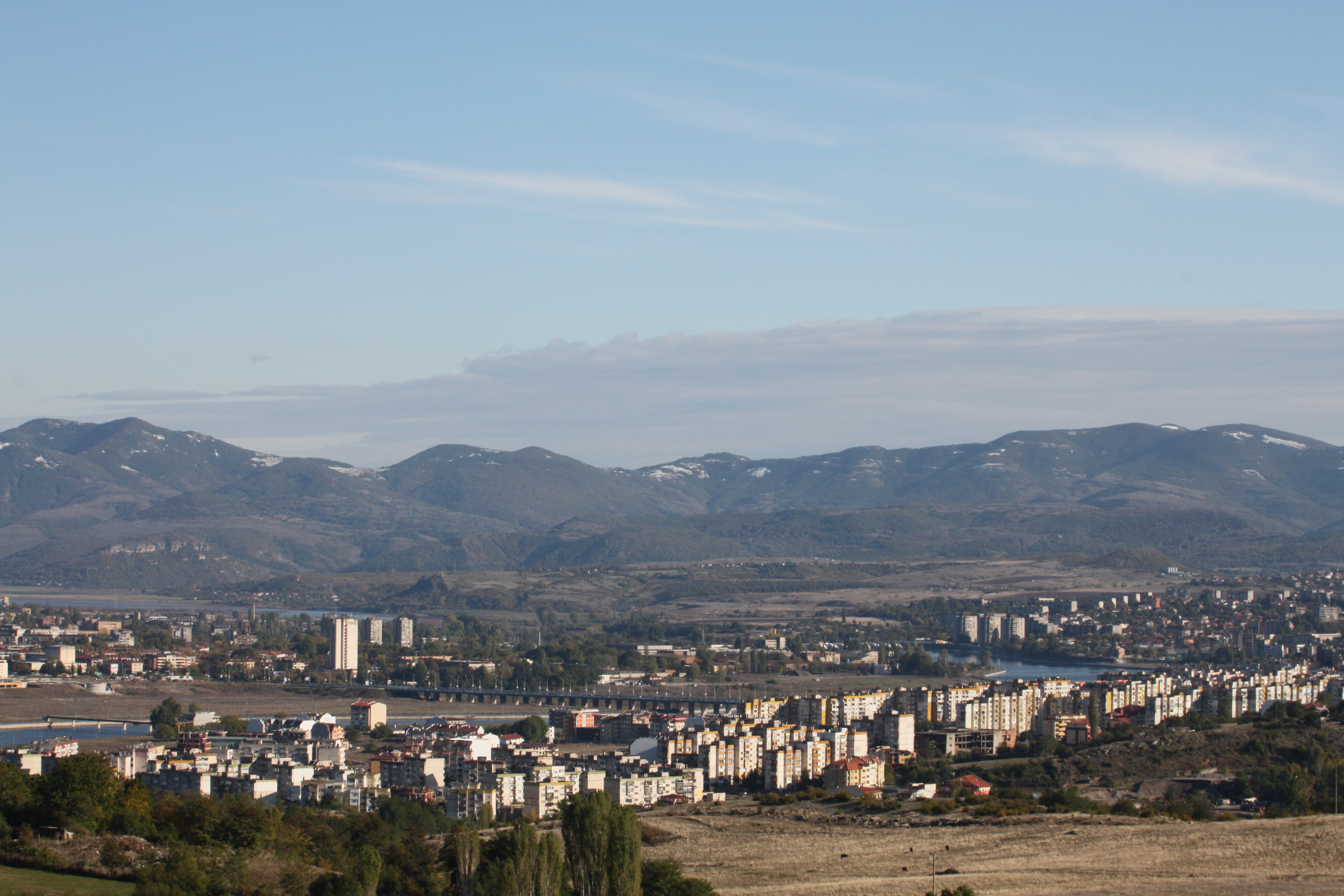
- Karzdhali from the Rhodopes mountains

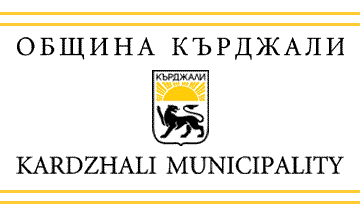
- Flag Coat of arms

- Location of Kardzhali
- Coordinates: 41°39′N 25°22′E
- Country: Bulgaria
- Province (Oblast): Kardzhali

Government
  - Mayor: Erol Myumyun (MRF)

Area
  - Total: 30.759 km^{2} (11.876 sq mi)
- Elevation: 275 m (902 ft)

Population (Census February 2011)
  - Total: 44,071
  - Density: 1,432.8/km^{2} (3,710.9/sq mi)
- Time zone: UTC+02:00 (EET)
  - Summer (DST): UTC+03:00 (EEST)
- Postal Code: 6600
- Area code: 0361
- Website: www.kardjali.bg

Kardzhali (Bulgarian: Кърджали [ˈkɤrd͡ʒɐli], Kărdžali; Turkish: Kırcaali), sometimes spelt Kardžali or Kurdzhali, is a town in the Eastern Rhodopes in Bulgaria, centre of Kardzhali Municipality and Kardzhali Province. The noted Kardzhali Reservoir is located nearby. It is an important regional economic hub.

== Geography ==
Kardzhali is located in the low eastern part of Rhodope Mountains, on both banks of the river Arda between the Kardzhali Reservoir to the west and the Studen Kladenets Reservoir to the east. The town is 260 km (162 mi) southeast of Sofia. It has a crossroad position from Thrace to the Aegean Sea—part of European transportation route 9, via the Makaza mountain pass.

=== Climate ===
Kardzhali has a hot-summer Mediterranean climate (Köppen climate classification: Csa), that is bordering closely on a humid subtropical climate (Köppen climate classification: Cfa), according to the Köppen climate classification. The city has hot summers and cold winters.

Climate data for Kardzhali (1991–2020) records (1926–present)
Month	Jan	Feb	Mar	Apr	May	Jun	Jul	Aug	Sep	Oct	Nov	Dec	Year
Record high °C (°F)	20.6 (69.1)	22.8 (73.0)	29.2 (84.6)	33.0 (91.4)	36.5 (97.7)	38.8 (101.8)	43.2 (109.8)	42.1 (107.8)	38.0 (100.4)	36.1 (97.0)	28.0 (82.4)	21.7 (71.1)	43.2 (109.8)
Mean daily maximum °C (°F)	7.0 (44.6)	9.2 (48.6)	12.9 (55.2)	18.1 (64.6)	23.1 (73.6)	27.7 (81.9)	30.7 (87.3)	31.0 (87.8)	26.0 (78.8)	19.6 (67.3)	13.5 (56.3)	8.1 (46.6)	18.9 (66.0)
Daily mean °C (°F)	2.1 (35.8)	3.8 (38.8)	7.1 (44.8)	11.8 (53.2)	16.7 (62.1)	20.9 (69.6)	23.7 (74.7)	23.8 (74.8)	19.0 (66.2)	13.4 (56.1)	8.2 (46.8)	3.5 (38.3)	12.8 (55.0)
Mean daily minimum °C (°F)	−2.3 (27.9)	−1.1 (30.0)	1.9 (35.4)	5.8 (42.4)	10.3 (50.5)	14.0 (57.2)	16.0 (60.8)	15.9 (60.6)	11.8 (53.2)	7.7 (45.9)	3.4 (38.1)	−0.6 (30.9)	6.9 (44.4)
Record low °C (°F)	−26.5 (−15.7)	−26.0 (−14.8)	−18.0 (−0.4)	−8.2 (17.2)	−0.3 (31.5)	5.2 (41.4)	6.4 (43.5)	5.8 (42.4)	−1.5 (29.3)	−6.6 (20.1)	−15.0 (5.0)	−19.2 (−2.6)	−26.5 (−15.7)
Average precipitation mm (inches)	56 (2.2)	60 (2.4)	58 (2.3)	52 (2.0)	64 (2.5)	58 (2.3)	35 (1.4)	26 (1.0)	34 (1.3)	58 (2.3)	63 (2.5)	80 (3.1)	655 (25.8)
Average precipitation days (≥ 1 mm)	7	6	7	7	8	7	5	3	5	5	6	8	74
Average relative humidity (%)	81.7	77.5	74.2	71.6	69.2	67.1	59.3	57.3	65.1	75.8	78.8	83.7	71.8
Mean monthly sunshine hours	92	112	154	192	233	271	309	302	230	156	102	78	2,229
Source 1: NOAA, Meteomanz (extremes since 2021)
Source 2: Climatebase.ru(Humidity and extremes)

== History ==
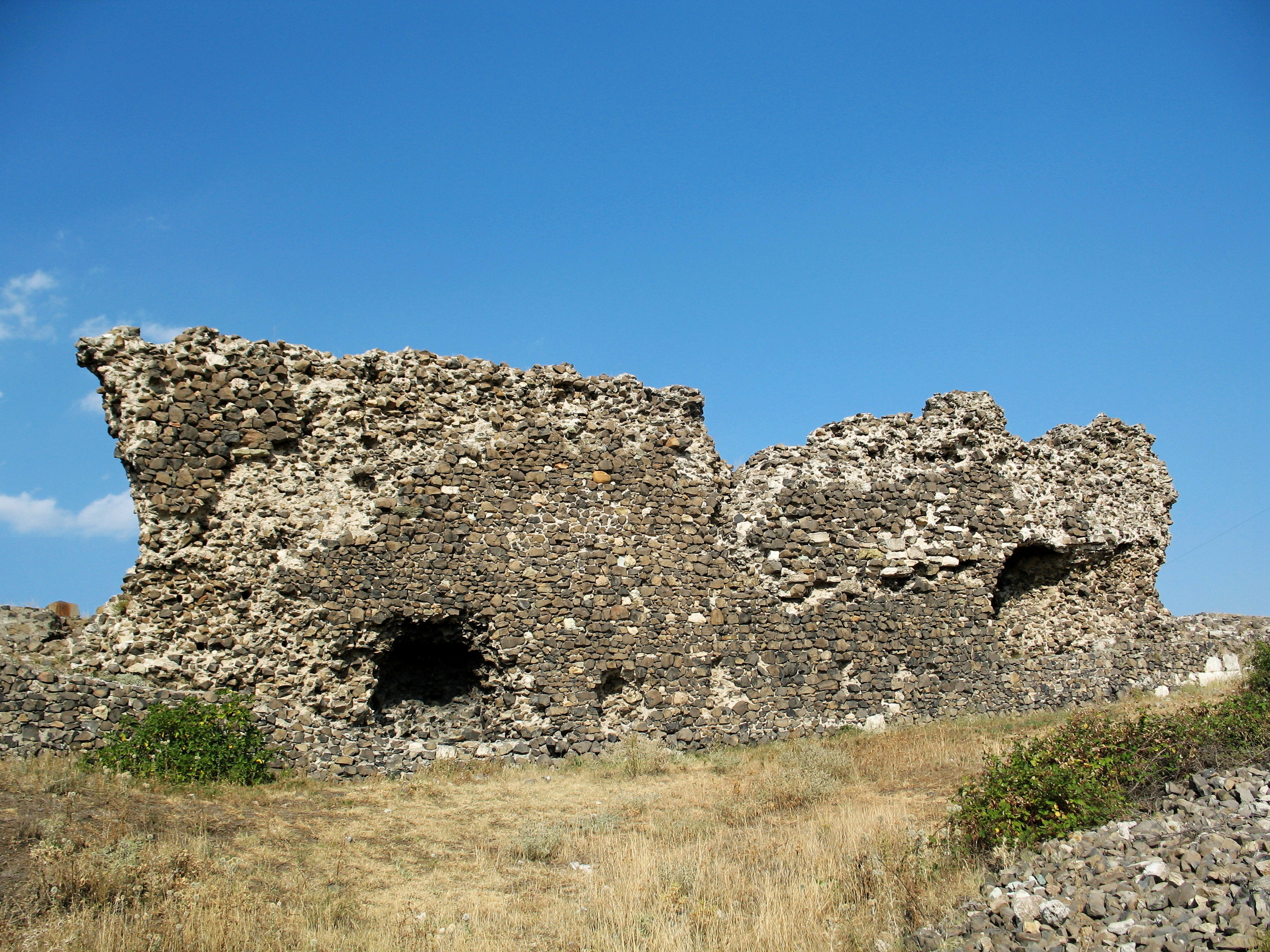
Vishegrad Fortress

The area where the town of Kardzhali is now located has been inhabited since the Neolithic. Many artifacts, comprising ceramics and primitive tools, have been found during the archaeological excavations. Most of them are now exhibited in the local historical museum.

Later Thracian tribes settled in the area and developed a highly advanced civilization. They built many sanctuaries dedicated to the gods of the sun and the earth. Near the village of Nenkovo (northwest of Kardzhali), an artificial cave was found in 2001. It has the form of a woman's womb and is called the Utroba Cave. Exactly at noon, when the sun is highest in the sky, a ray of light comes in through a stone slit forming a falitic shade in the cave. According to the Thracian beliefs, this is the conception of the new sun god. This cave is considered a complex astronomic facility (compared to Stonehenge in Great Britain) as the ray of light enters the cave on a single day of the year.

There are many stone castles and palaces that the Thracians built in the region, including Perperek, Ustra, and Vishegrad. The most magnificent is Perperikon, where a Thracian king resided. The place has become increasingly popular since the recent archaeological works rendered wealth of artifacts.

During the Byzantine period, Kardzhali was the center of a Christian eparchy: Achridos. During the reign of the Bulgarian Empire, Kardzhali was known as Zherkovo a name that was used by the Bulgarians until the 17th century. The Monastery of John the Precursor (Bulgarian: Йоан Продром or Йоан Предтеча) was built in the 6th-8th centuries and is now a monument of medieval architecture. Apart from the fortress of Vishegrad on the right bank of the Arda, the eastern approaches of the town were protected by the medieval castle of Monyak on the left bank of the river.

A couple of other monasteries were built during this era, with some of them remaining until the early 19th century. The area was of strategic importance for the Bulgarian Empire during the Middle Ages and the remains of numerous Medieval fortress scattered on the surrounding hills can still be seen.

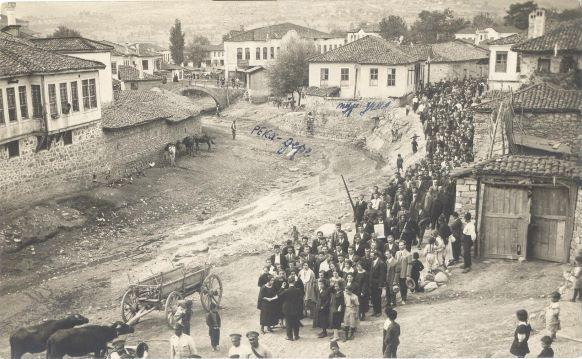

The town developed largely due to its position on the trade routes during the period of Ottoman rule. However, it remained a small town. During the 18th century, Turkish brigands used this remote town as a hideaway and supply point, and the town was later named after their leader Kırca Ali. The best known of these units was led by Pazvantoğlu Osman Pasha, who ruled most of the northeastern Ottoman lands and the Danube estuary until his death in 1807.

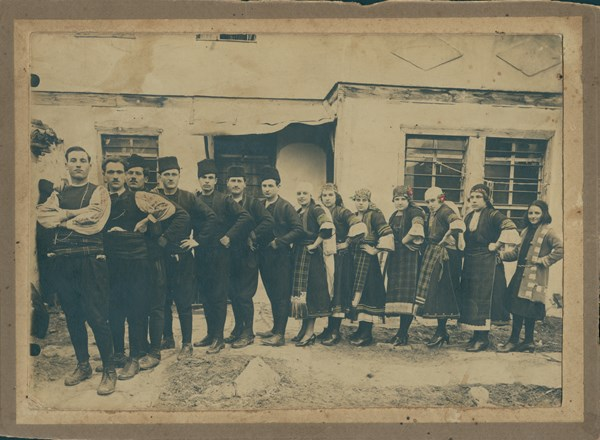
Round dance

Kardzhali and its neighborhood became part of the autonomous province of Eastern Rumelia under the stipulations of the Berlin Congress of 1878, but, after the reunification of the Principality of Bulgaria and Eastern Rumelia in 1885, it was ceded back to the Ottoman Empire as a township of Gümülcine sanjak in Edirne vilayet. Ottoman rule ended during the First Balkan War when the town and the surrounding area were liberated by the Bulgarian General Vasil Delov on 21 October 1912. The day has been celebrated with concerts and commemorative events as a municipal holiday since 1937. Kardzhali was declared the center of Kardzhali Province, when it was created from the most southern part of Stara Zagora Province in 1949.

== Demographics ==
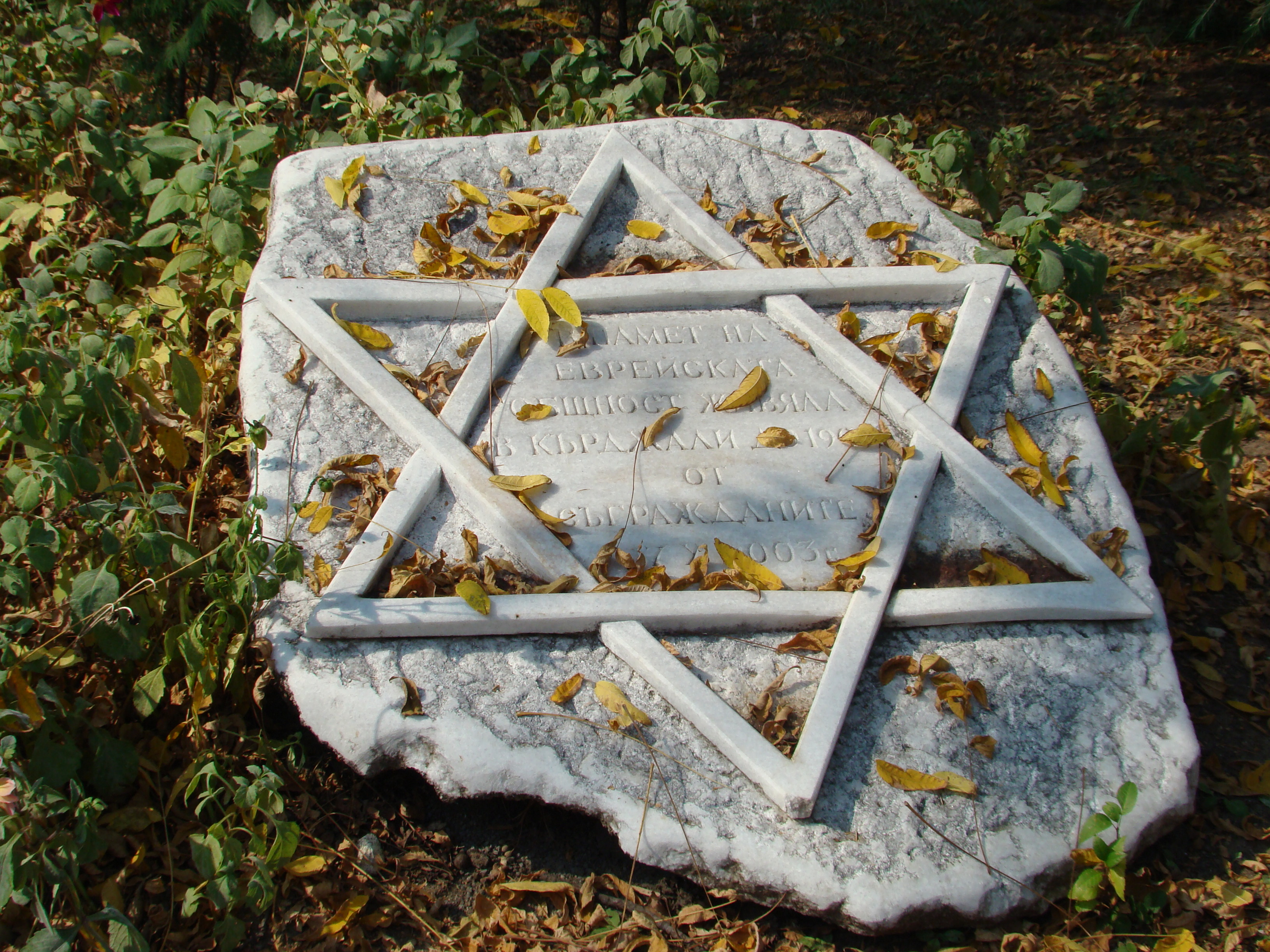
Memorial to the Jewish community of Kardzhali

According to the 2011 census, Kardzhali has a population of 43,880, while the Kardzhali municipality (which in addition to the city also includes 117 villages) has a population of 67,846.

Historical population
Year	Pop.	±%
1934	7,767	—
1946	10,502	+35.2%
1956	20,955	+99.5%
1965	33,271	+58.8%
1975	47,786	+43.6%
1985	55,400	+15.9%
1992	45,793	−17.3%
2001	45,659	−0.3%
2011	43,880	−3.9%
2021	40,659	−7.3%
Source: Censuses

During Ottoman rule before 1912 most of the population of the city were Muslims – Turks, Pomaks, and Muslim Roma. After the Second Balkan War and the First World War, Bulgarian Christian refugees from Eastern and Western Thrace settled in Kardzhali. Some Turks immediately moved to the remains of the Ottoman Empire in 1913 in response to the Bulgarian takeover. Further emigration to Turkey continued between 1913 and 1989. This included two emigration waves in the 1930s and 1950s as a result of treaties between Bulgaria and Turkey and most notably in 1989 in response to the state sponsored Revival Process which saw the forced Bulgarisation of ethnic Turks.

After 1990 the deteriorating economic conditions in Bulgaria (and especially the region) during the post-communist transition led to significant emigration by both Bulgarians and Turks, with the Bulgarians moving to other parts of the country or abroad and with the Turks moving mainly to Turkey.

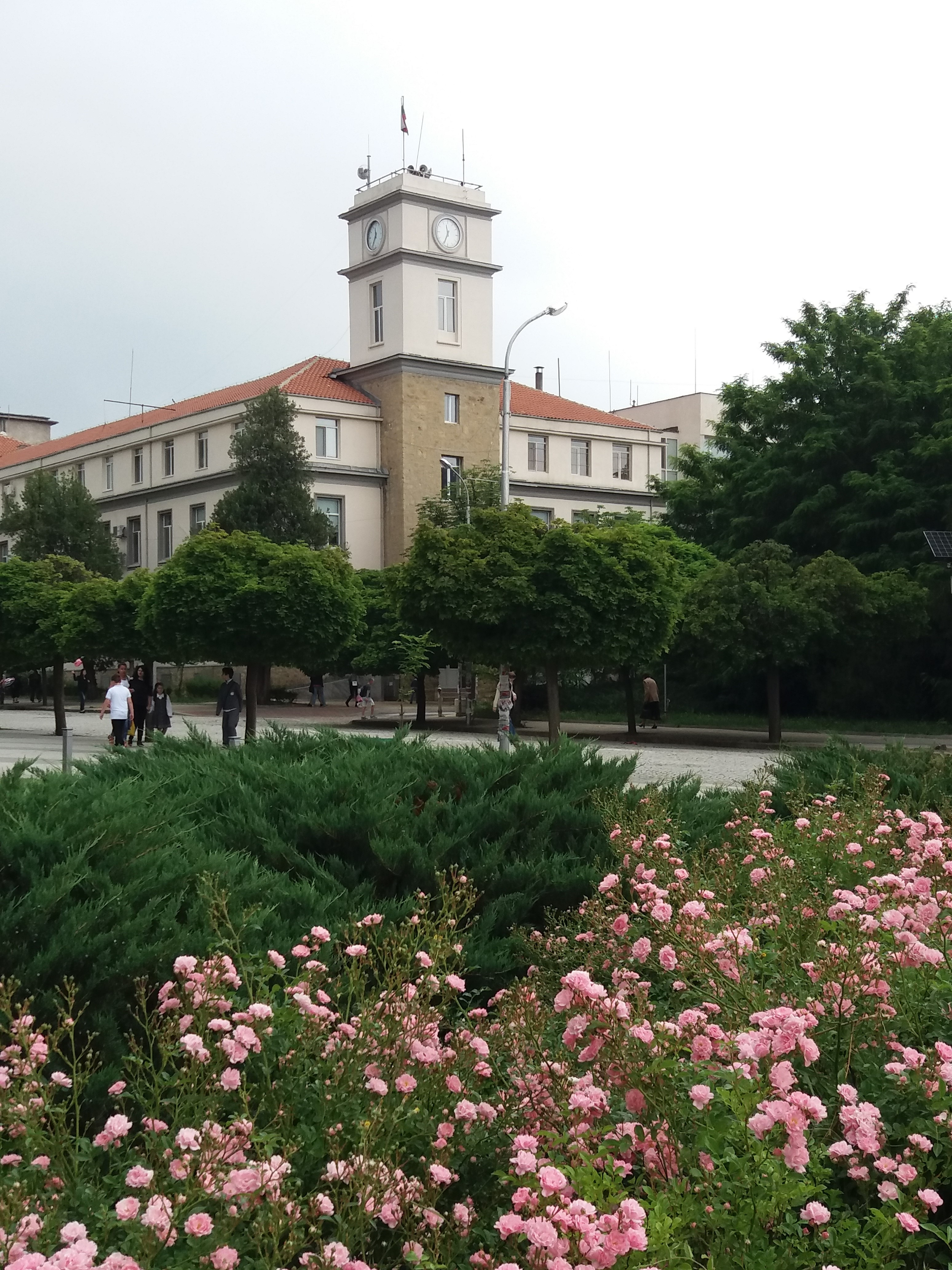
Kardzhali Old Clock Tower

According to the last census in 2011 Kardzhali Province is the Bulgarian province with the highest relative proportion of ethnic Turks, though Kardzhali municipality and the city itself have a lower proportion of ethnic Turks than the rest of the province. According to the optional question on ethnic identification, the city itself has a Bulgarian majority (many Bulgarians in Kardzhali are Muslims, also known as Pomaks) of 61%, while Turks are 34.9% and others and undeclared are 4.1%. The Kardzhali municipality has a Turkish majority of 55.5%, while Bulgarians are 40.5% and others and undeclared are 4%. In 2001, the population of Kardzhali municipality consisted of 53% Turks, 42% Bulgarians and others and undeclared. The municipal government today is primarily in the hands of the Turkish-dominated Movement for Rights and Freedoms.

In December 1989 and January 1990 there were a series of demonstrations in Kardzhali against the liberalization of anti-Turkish laws. A particular issue of contention was whether Turkish should be taught in state schools as an elective. In response Turkish students boycotted schools until the ban on using their mother tongue was discontinued.

== Economy ==
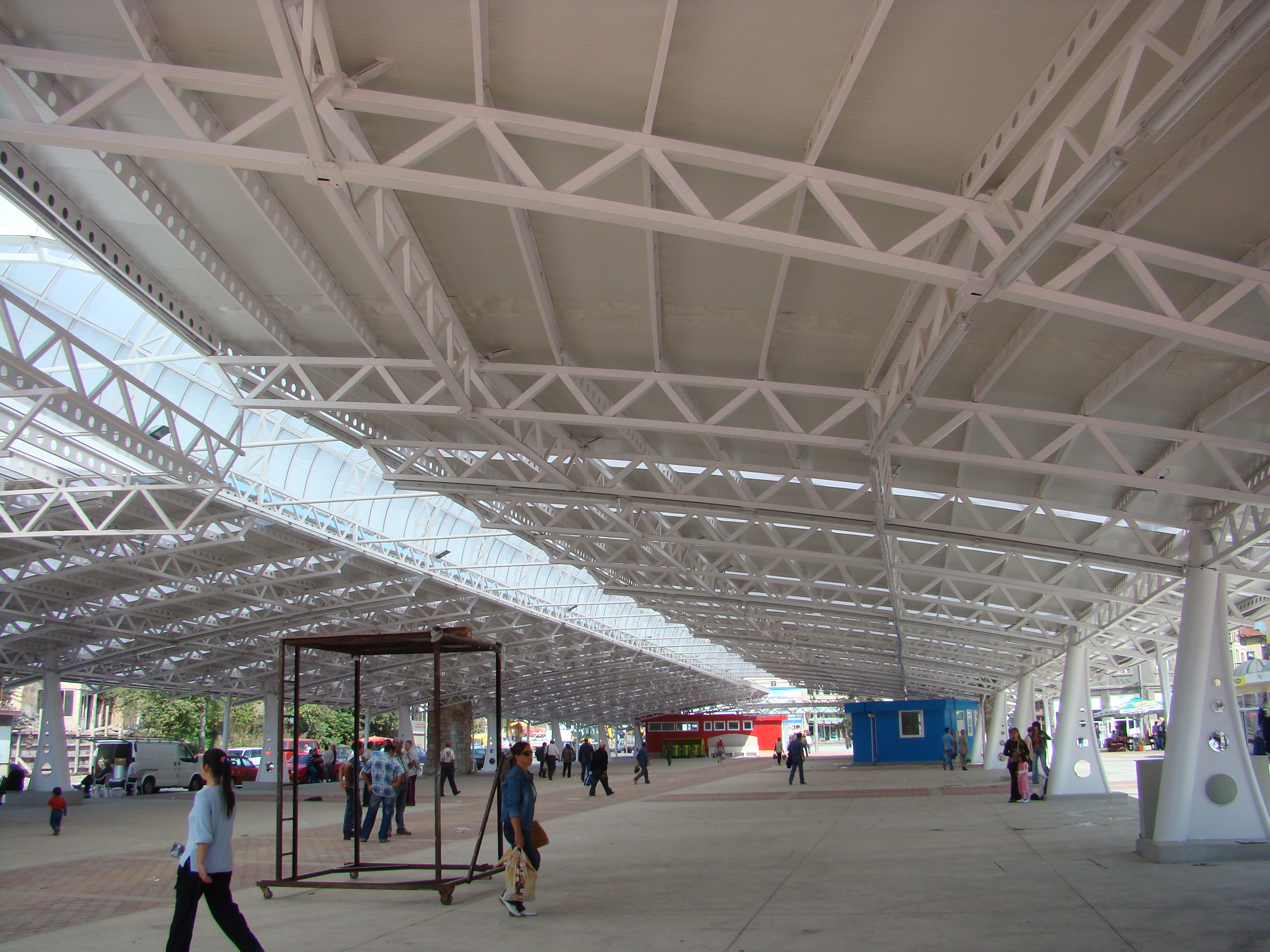
The new open market

Formerly Kardzhali was a tobacco processing center, but for economic reasons all of the communist era industrial plants are no longer operative. The large deposits of lead and zinc ore in the area once made the town an attractive location for the metallurgy and machine building industry. However, in 2016 the no-longer-operative large Lead and Zinc Complex near the city met its final end with its two stacks being torn down.

Nowadays retail trade and services constitute the largest share of local production. The abundance of cultural and natural sights in the area also make it a promising area for tourism.

In 2007 in the city were opened hypermarkets of the chains Technomarket, LIDL, Billa and Technopolis and the construction of the city's new marketplace was complete. In 2014 a hypermarket of the chain Kaufland opened too. However the local economy has stalled.

The percentage of the labour force working in agriculture increased from 41% to 47% in just 7 years (the period between 2010 and 2017). Kardzhali has the second highest percentage of people working in agriculture, after Silistra Province.

== Culture and tourism ==
Mosque and tombe of the founder of the modern city of Kırcali is situated in the old city near the marketplace.

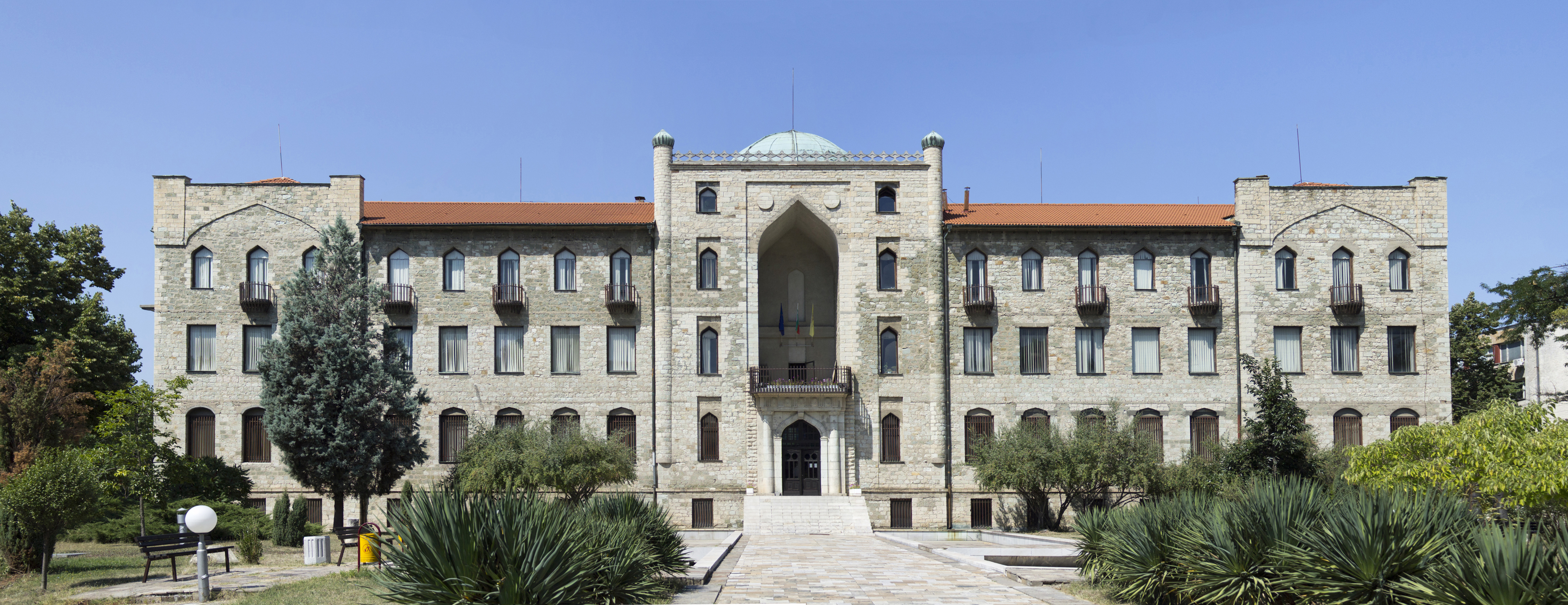
History Museum of Kardzhali (Pomerantsev, Moorish Revival, 1910s)

The Thracian town of Perperikon is located near the city on a rock high above the valley. It is interesting for the fact that it is cut in the rock.

The monastery from 11th century is located in the Vesselchane Quarter of the town. It was renovated in 2000 and a new bell tower was built.

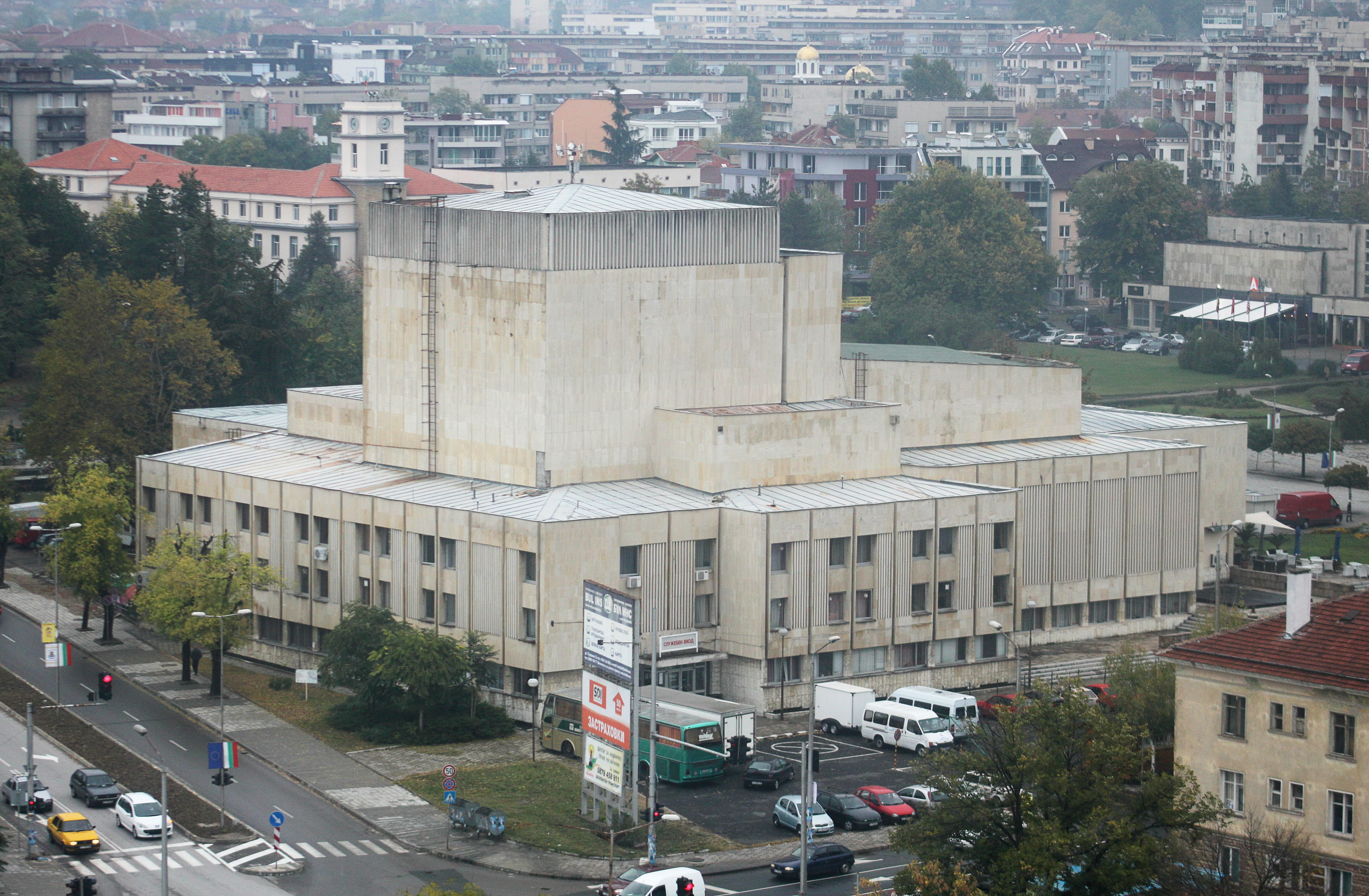
Kardzhali Theatre

The town clock is unique in Bulgaria because it sounds Bulgarian revolutionary songs every hour.

The Kardzhali Museum of History has one of the most extensive exhibitions in Southern Bulgaria. This includes pre-historic tools and ceramics from the Thracian cities of Perperikon and Tatul, Christian icons and ethnographic exhibits. It is located in the old konak (the Turkish town-hall built around 1870) with its period exterior architecture.

There are many open-air restaurants, offering a variety of drinks and cocktails in summer time on the dam. It is a popular place among fans of water sports and fishing.

The town has two drama theaters — "Dimitar Dimov" and "Kadrie Lyatifova", a puppet theater and a museum of history medrese, as well as an art gallery.

5 km (3 mi) from Kardzhali, near the village of Zimzelen, is a small badlands, where a series of white pillars have eroded out of the volcanic tuff which are referred to as the "Kardzhali Pyramids". Ensembles have been given names based on resemblances. One is known as "The Mushrooms" and another as the "Stone Wedding".

Kardzhali Point on Byers Peninsula, Livingston Island in the South Shetland Islands, Antarctica is named after Kardzhali.

Longdistance hiking path the Sultans Trail passes Kardzhali dam, city center and many villages.

== Sport ==
FK Arda Kardzhali, founded on 13 October 1924, is an association football club currently competes in the First League, the top tier of the Bulgarian football league system. They play at the Arda Arena.

== Dams ==
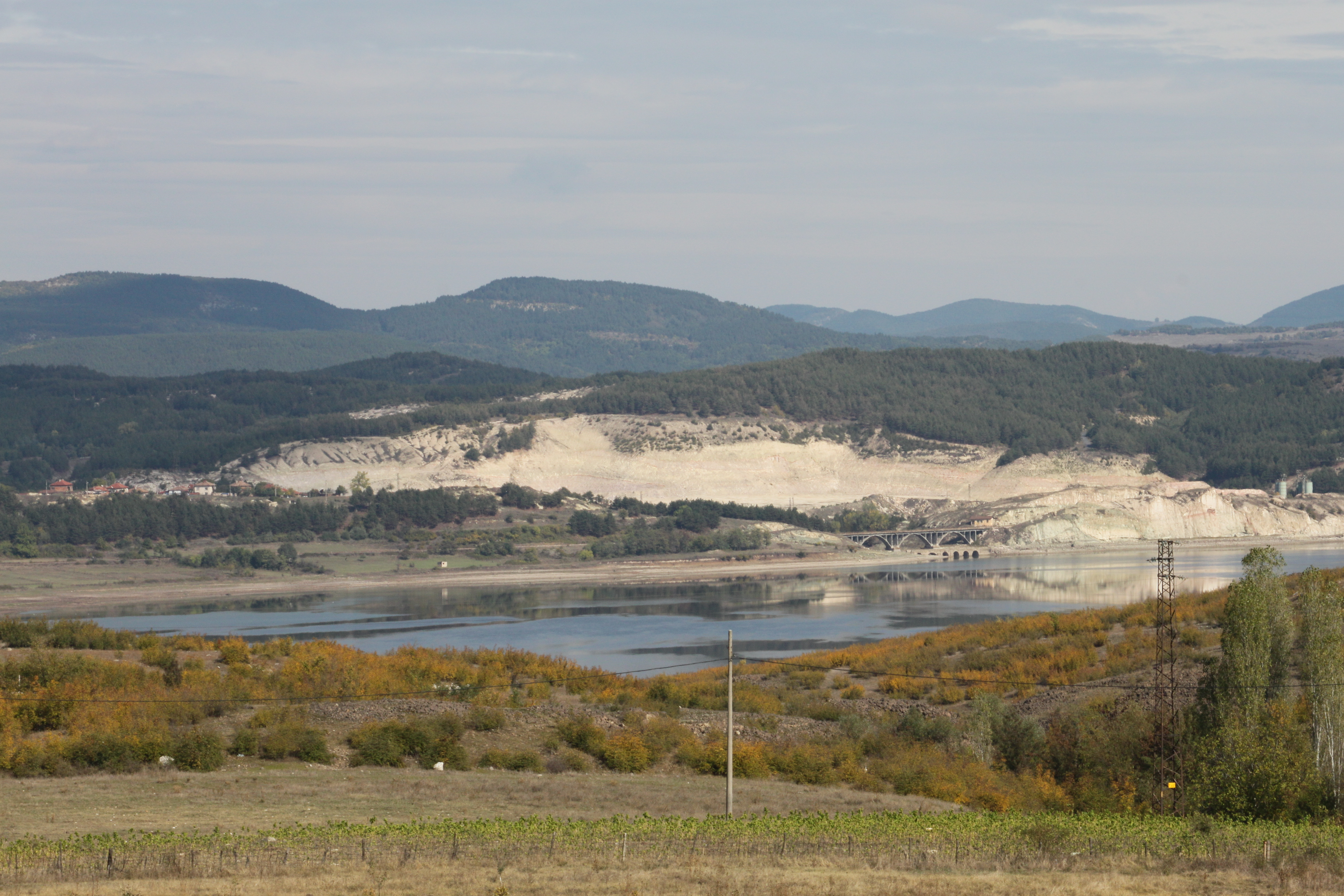
River Arda

The town is situated on the north and south banks of river Arda and it is bordered to the west by Kardzhali Dam, and by Studen Kladenets Dam to the east. At maximum capacity, the waters of the Studen Kladenets Dam extend to the foot of the old Veselchane bridge. The concrete wall of the Kurdzhali Dam is located about two kilometers (1.2 miles) upstream from that bridge. The banks of the river running through the town have been adjusted by the recently completed Water Mirror reservoir, creating an environment for water sports and recreational activities.

In the 1970s, the reservoir of the Kurdzhali Dam was artificially seeded with sheatfish. Today, specimens that reach 100 kg (220 lb) can be found. In the last years 45,000 carp were introduced into the dam as well. Most recently it was artificially seeded with European perch. The fish were taken from the Ovčarica (Ovcharitsa) dam.

== Notable people ==
- Tanya Gogova (born 1950), Bulgarian volleyball player
- Lyutvi Mestan (born 1960), Turkish-Bulgarian politician. Chairman of the Movement for Rights and Freedoms from January 2013 to 24 December 2015.
- Halil Mutlu (born 1973), Turkish world and Olympic gold medalist in weightlifting
- Emin Nouri (born 1985), Turkish footballer
- Tahsin Özgüç (1916–2005), Turkish archaeologist
- Ivo Papazov (born 1952), Bulgarian clarinetist
- Houben R.T. (born 1970), Bulgarian painter
- Taner Sağır (born 1985), Turkish world and Olympic gold medalist in weightlifting
- İlyas Şükrüoğlu (born 1966), Turkish European twice silver medalist and Mediterranean Games champion in freestyle wrestling
- Mehmed Talat Pasha (1872–1921), one of the triumvirate known as the Three Pashas that de facto ruled the Ottoman Empire during the First World War

== Gallery ==
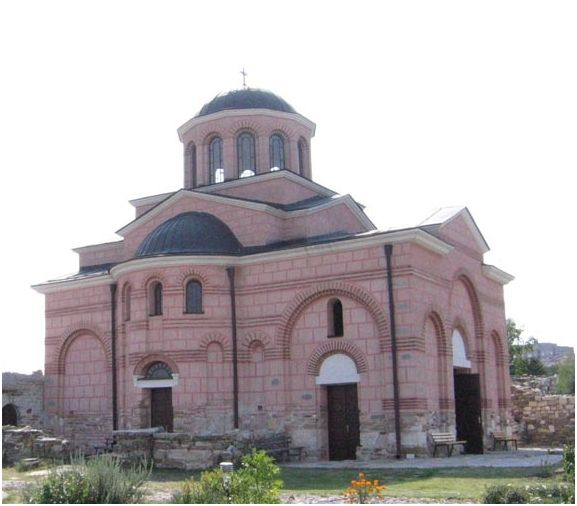

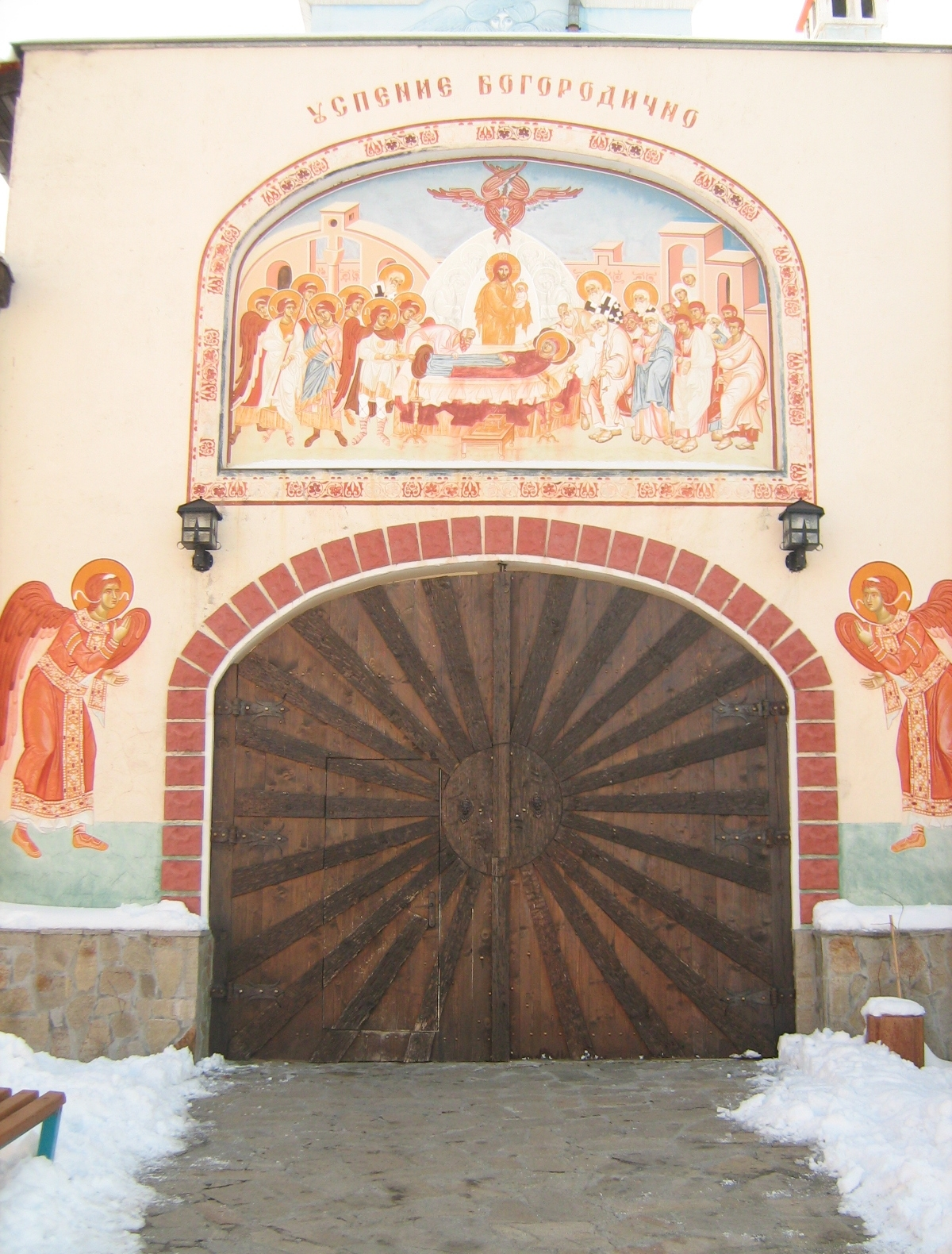

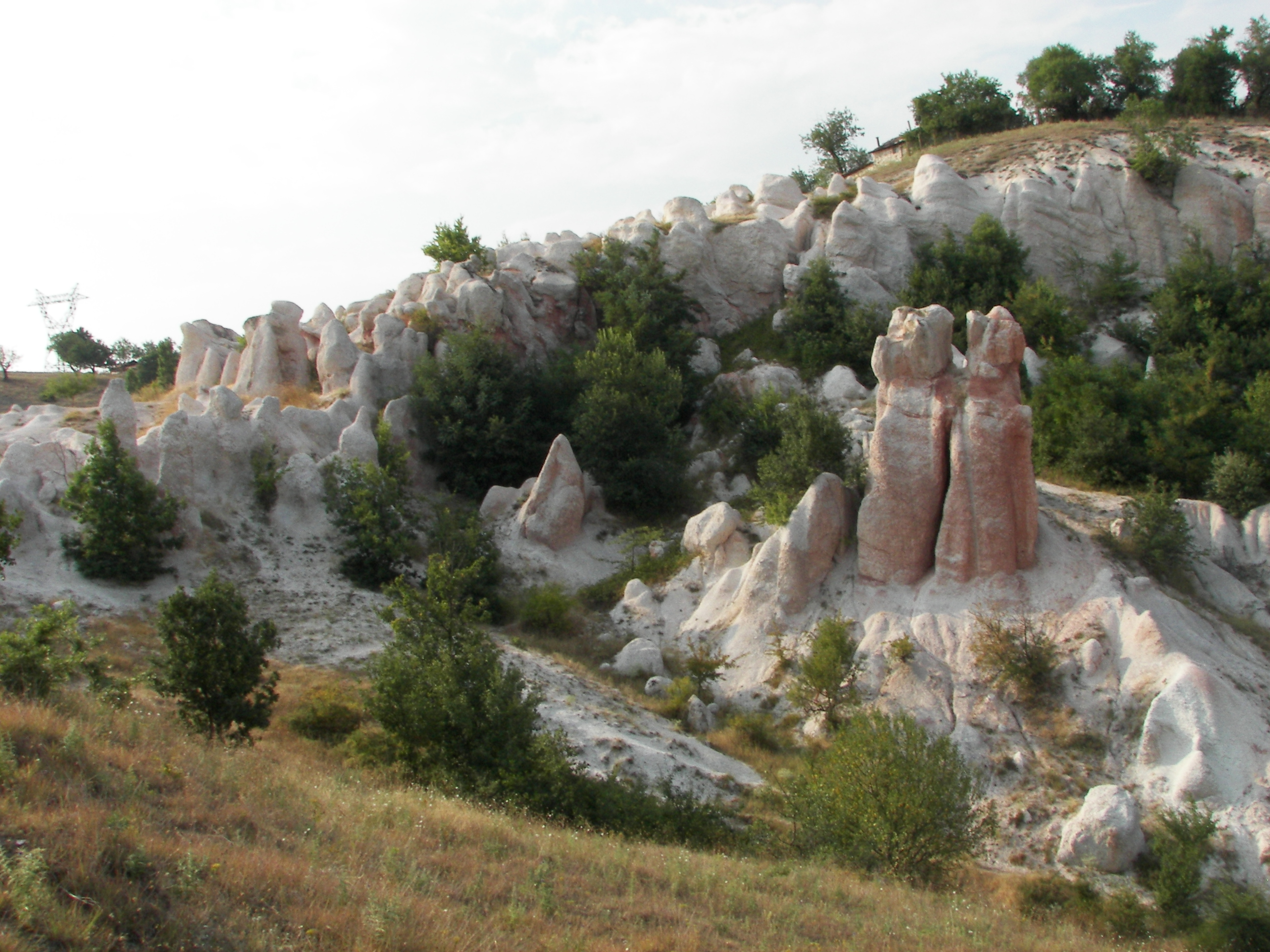

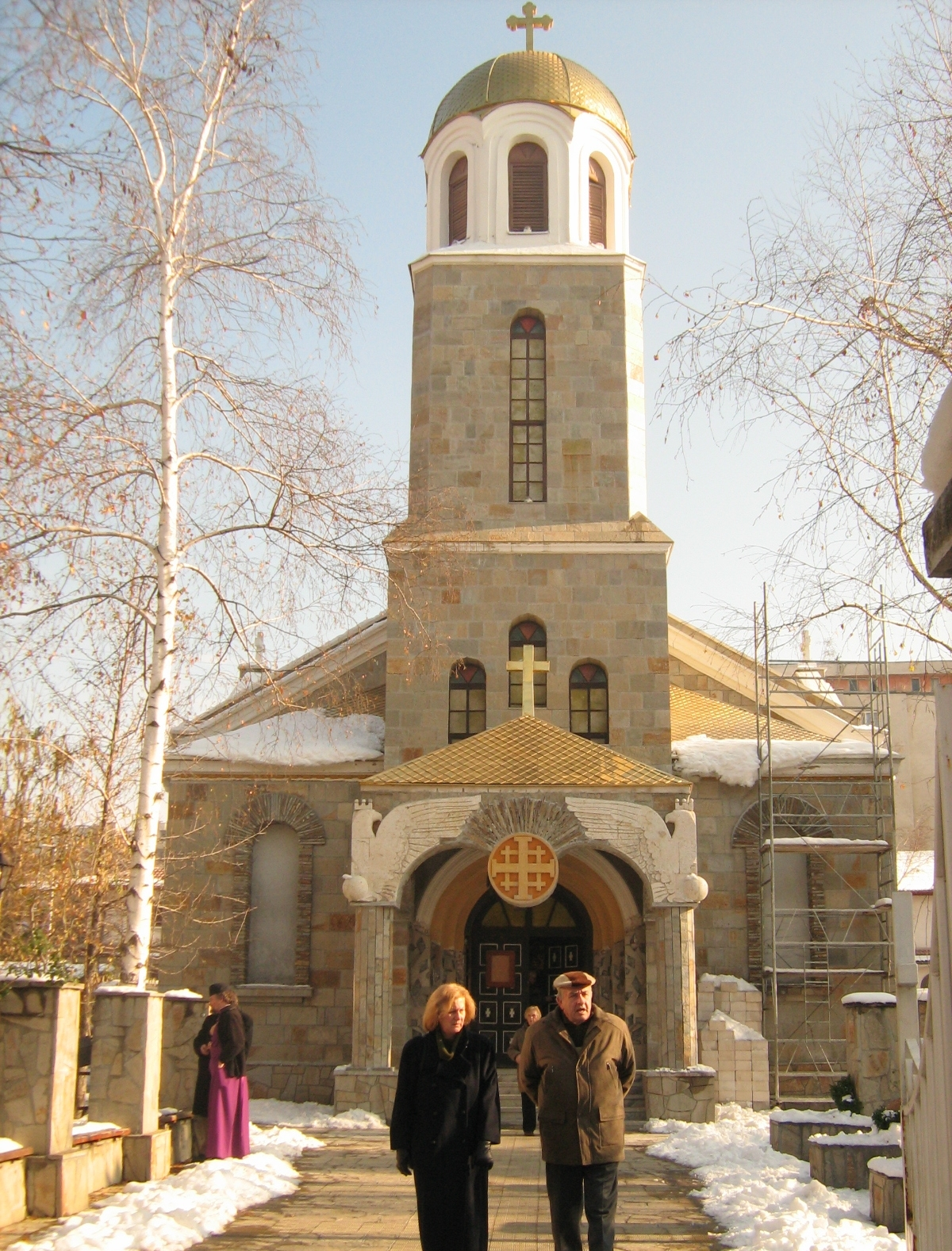

== Twin towns – sister cities ==
Kardzhali is twinned with:

- (England) East Staffordshire, United Kingdom
- Edirne, Turkey
- Elkhart, United States
- Filippoi, Greece
- Gaziosmanpaşa (Istanbul), Turkey
- Komotini, Greece
- Silivri, Turkey
- Soufli, Greece
- Tekirdağ, Turkey
- Vladimir, Russia
- Kukës (Luma), Albania
