= Vishegrad, Kardzhali Province =

Vishegrad Вишеград
- Village
- Location of Vishegrad, Bulgaria
- Coordinates: 41.6167°N 25.4167°E
- Country: Bulgaria
- Province: Kardzhali Province
- Municipality: Kardzhali
- Time zone: UTC+2 (EET)
  - Summer (DST): UTC+3 (EEST)

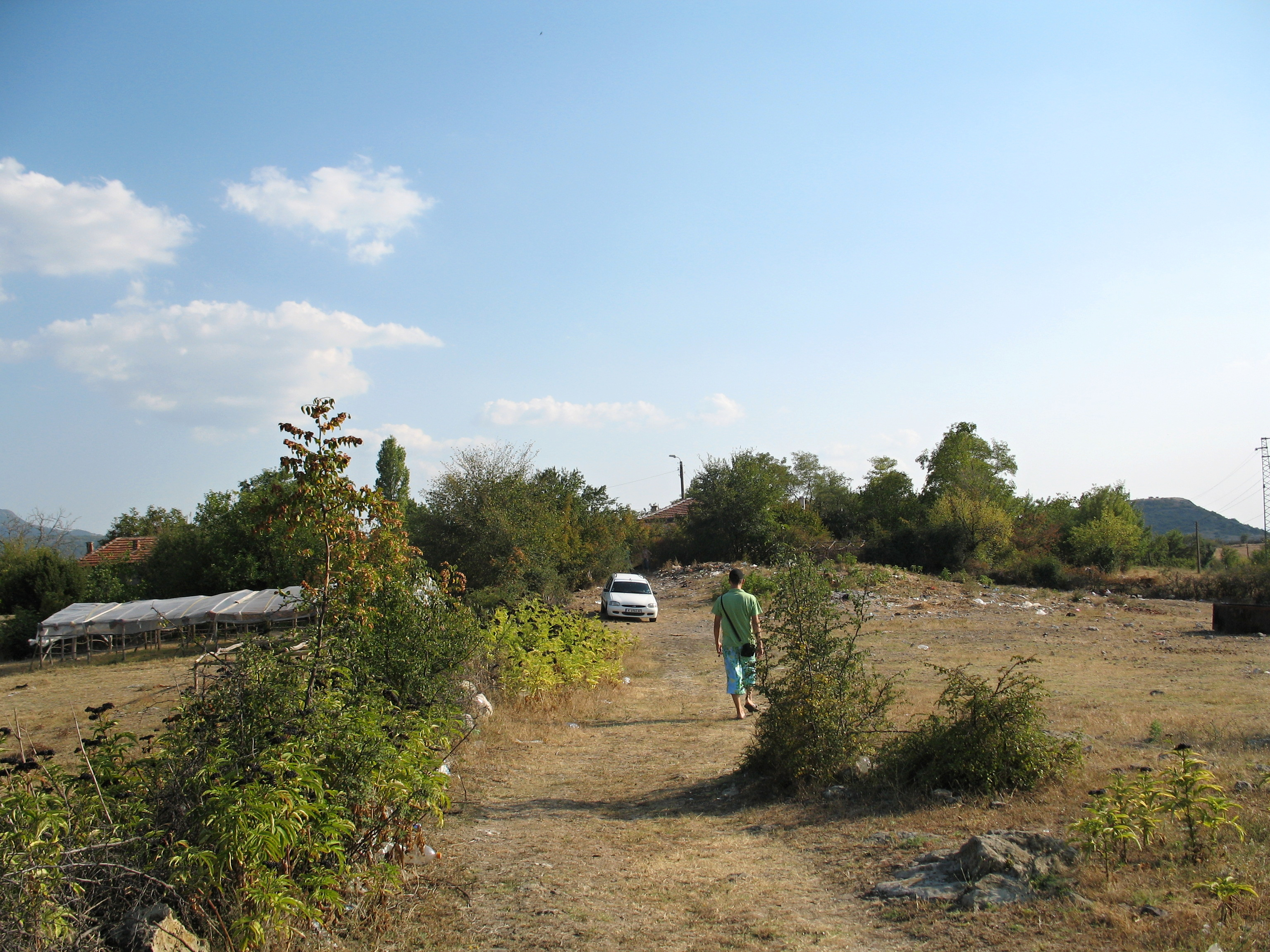
Village Vishegrad, Kardzali Municipality, Bulgaria

Vishegrad (Bulgarian: Вишеград) is a village in Kardzhali Municipality, Kardzhali Province, southern Bulgaria. On the shores of the Studen Kladenets Reservoir on the river Arda just north of the village is located the medieval Bulgarian fortress of Vishegrad.

Vishegrad Knoll on Trinity Peninsula in Antarctica is named after the village.
