= Monyak =

Medieval stronghold

Monyak Fortress
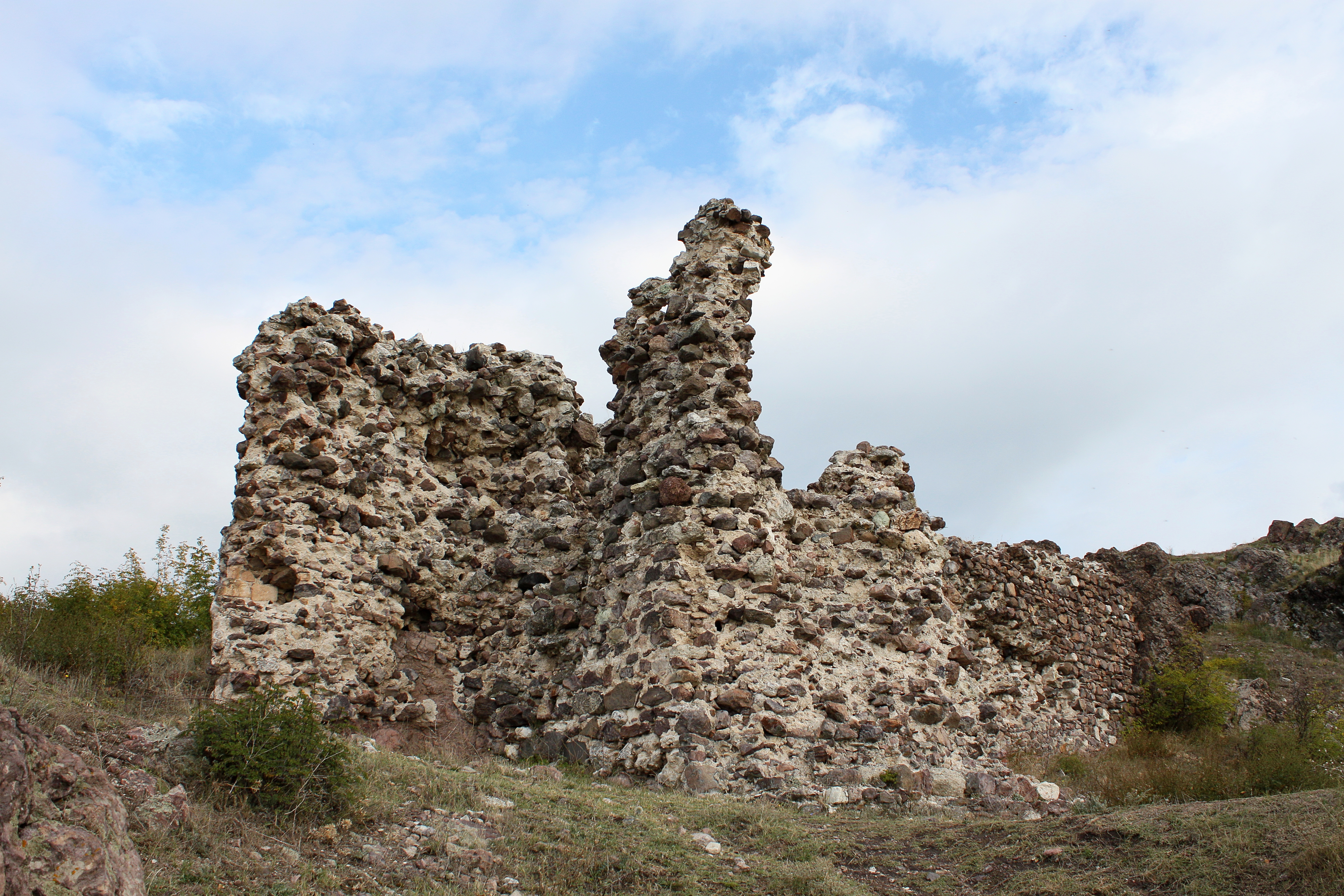
- Monyak Fortress

- Location within Bulgaria

General information
- Architectural style: Fortress
- Location: Shiroko pole, Bulgaria
- Coordinates: 41°38′45.6″N 25°26′27.96″E
- Construction started: 11th century

Monyak (Bulgarian: Моняк) is a 12th-century medieval fortress in the Rhodope Mountains of southern Bulgaria, mentioned in the chronicles of the Fourth Crusade as Chastel de Moniac in Old French. It had a strategic role in protecting the Zhelezna Vrata Pass.

== Location and description ==
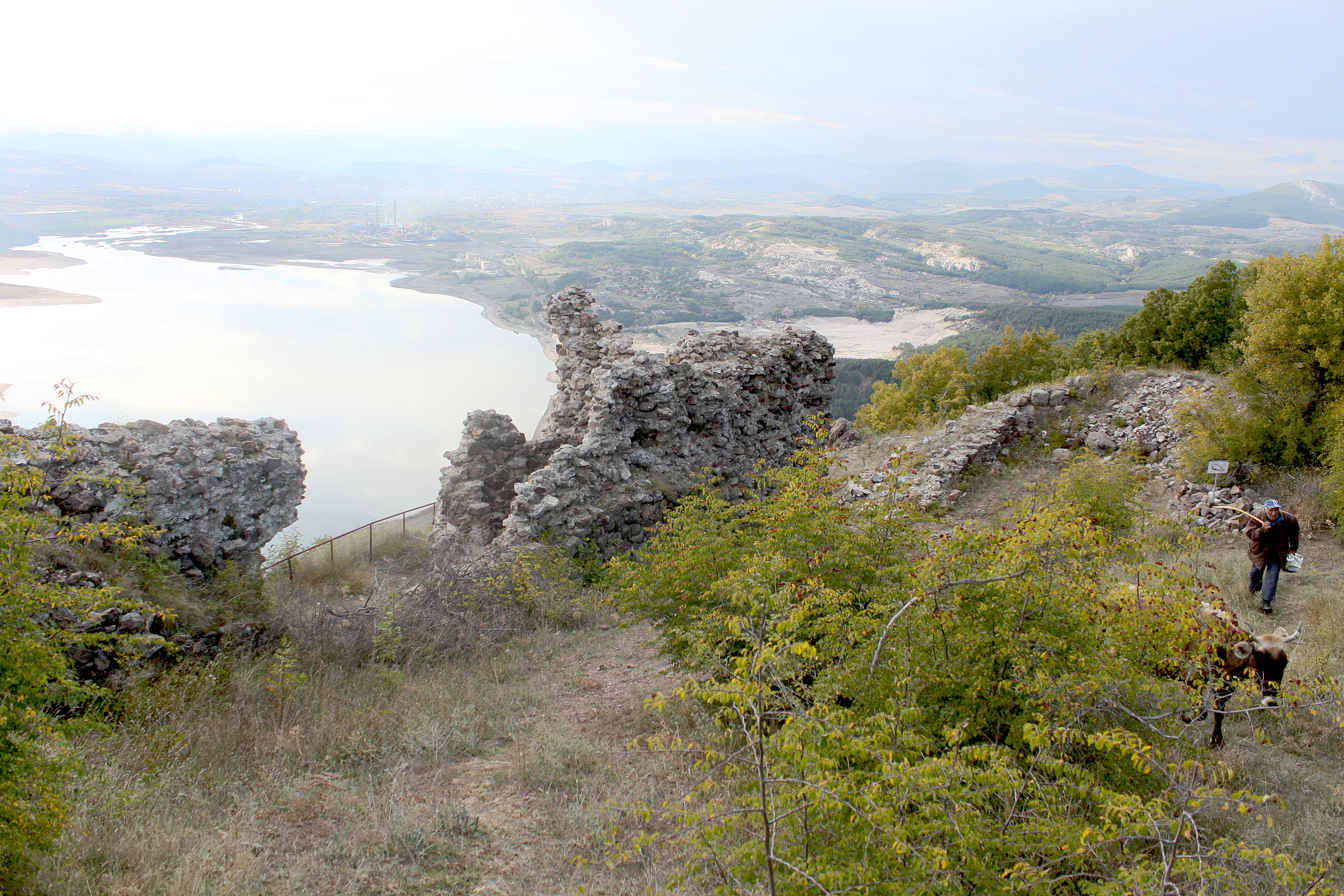
A view from Monyak towards Kardzhali

Monyak is identified with the fortress ruins on a 587 m height rising on the left bank of the river Arda over the modern Studen Kladenets Reservoir. It lies in Kardzhali Province some 4 km south of the village of Shiroko pole and 12 km east from the town of Kardzhali. From Monyak there is an excellent visibility towards the Vishegrad Fortress (306 m) on the right bank of the Arda some 4.5 km to the west, as well as to the fortress of the medieval Monastery of John the Precursor 7.5 km to the west. Monyak and Vishegrad were likely constructed to the protect the region around the mouth of the river Varbitsa and the roads along its course.

Monyak consisted of a citadel in the eastern highest section and an outer ring. It is difficult to access due to the steep escarpments of the hill. Its remains include parts of the defensive walls, an octagonal tower and water reservoirs dated from the 12th century, probably during and/or before the Third Crusade, built on the foundations of a significantly older Roman castrum. The preserved part of the outer fortress wall along the northern side of the hill is more than 270 m long, and its height in places reaches 7–8 m. It is built of stones welded with lime and sand. The remains of the tower reach about 3–4 m in height. The entrance is from the west and is protected by two towers. The total area of the fortification is 18,000 m^{2}, including the citadel that encompassed around 600 m^{2}.

During the construction of the fortress, serious attention was paid to the reservoirs. There are two above-ground water tanks. All this is evident in its function as protected habitation for a large number of people and the possibility to shelter an army.

== History ==
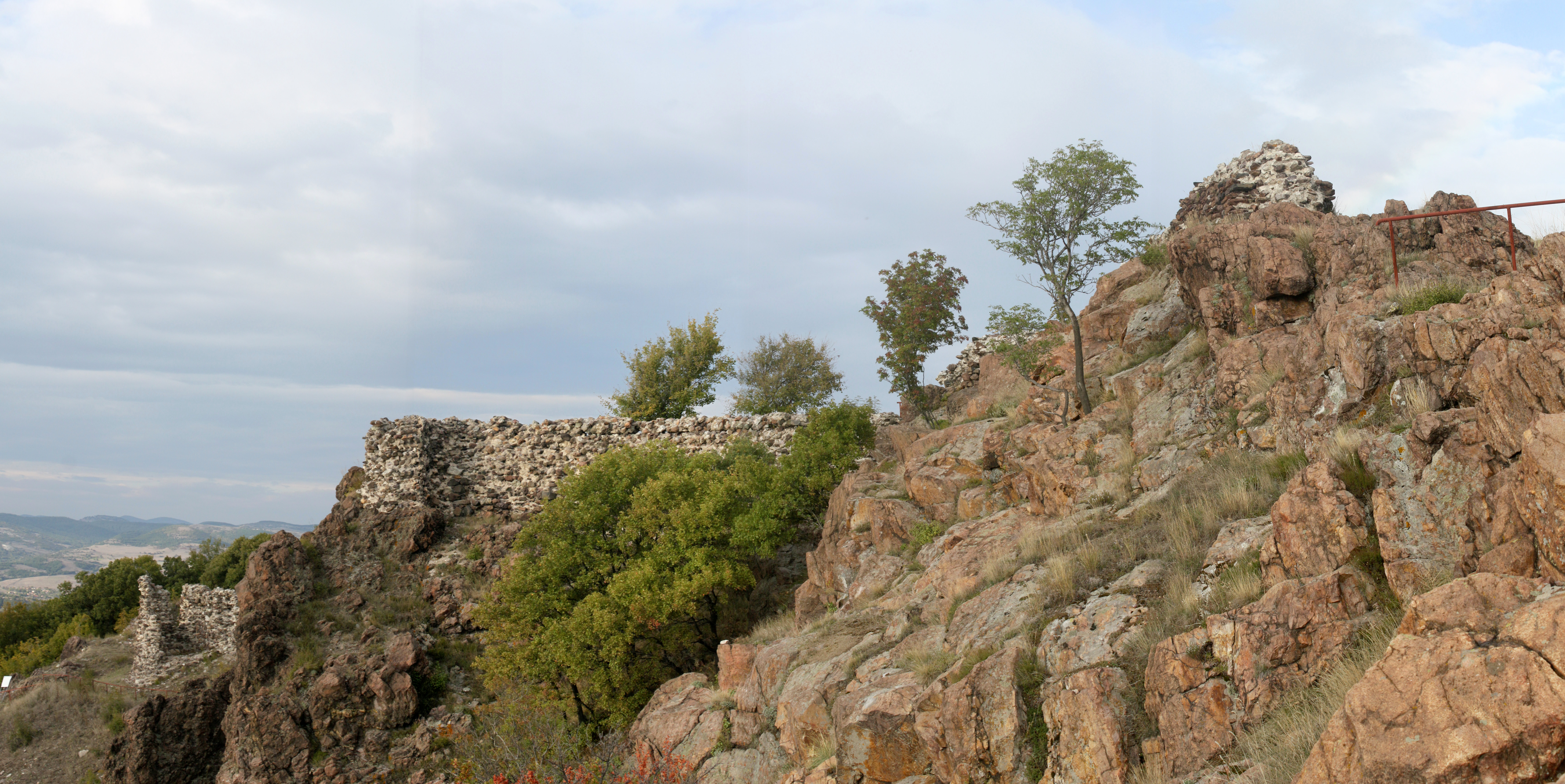
Ruins of the walls

The fortress was mentioned in the chronicles of the Third and Fourth Crusades of the late 12th and early 13th century as Manicaua or Moniac. The eyewitness account on the Forth Crusade On the Conquest of Constantinople by Geoffrey of Villehardouin mentioned the fortress on two occasions in the context of the 1206 campaigns of the Bulgarian–Latin wars between the Bulgarian emperor Kaloyan and the Latin Empire:

"Then did Henry, the Regent of the empire, take council with the barons that were with him; and they decided to ride forward. So they rode forward for two days, and encamped in a very fair valley, near a castle called Moniac. The castle yielded itself to them, and they remained there five days; and then said they would go and relieve Renier of Trit, who was besieged in Stanimac, and had been shut up therein for thirteen months. So Henry the Regent of the empire, remained in the camp, with a great part of the host, and the remainder went forward to relieve Renier of Trit at Stanimac."

It was at Monyak that Henry of Flanders was informed in late July 1206 of the death of the Latin emperor Baldwin I in Bulgarian captivity, who had been captured in the battle of Adrianople in the previous year, and headed to Constantinople for his own coronation:

"Then said the barons that they had often heard tell that the Emperor Baldwin had died in Johannizza's [Kaloyan's] prison, but that they did not believe it. Renier of Trit, however, told them of a truth that the emperor was dead, and then they believed it. Greatly did many then grieve; alas if only their grief had not been beyond remedy. So they lay that night in the city; and on the morrow they departed, and abandoned Stanimac. They rode for two days, and on the third they came to the camp, below the castle of Moniac, that lies on the river Arta, where Henry, the Emperor's brother, was waiting for them. Greatly did those of the host rejoice over Renier of Trit, who had thus been rescued from durance, and great was the credit given to those who had brought him back, for they had gone for him in great peril. The barons now resolved that they would go to Constantinople, and crown Henry, the brother of the Emperor Baldwin as emperor..."

== Gallery ==
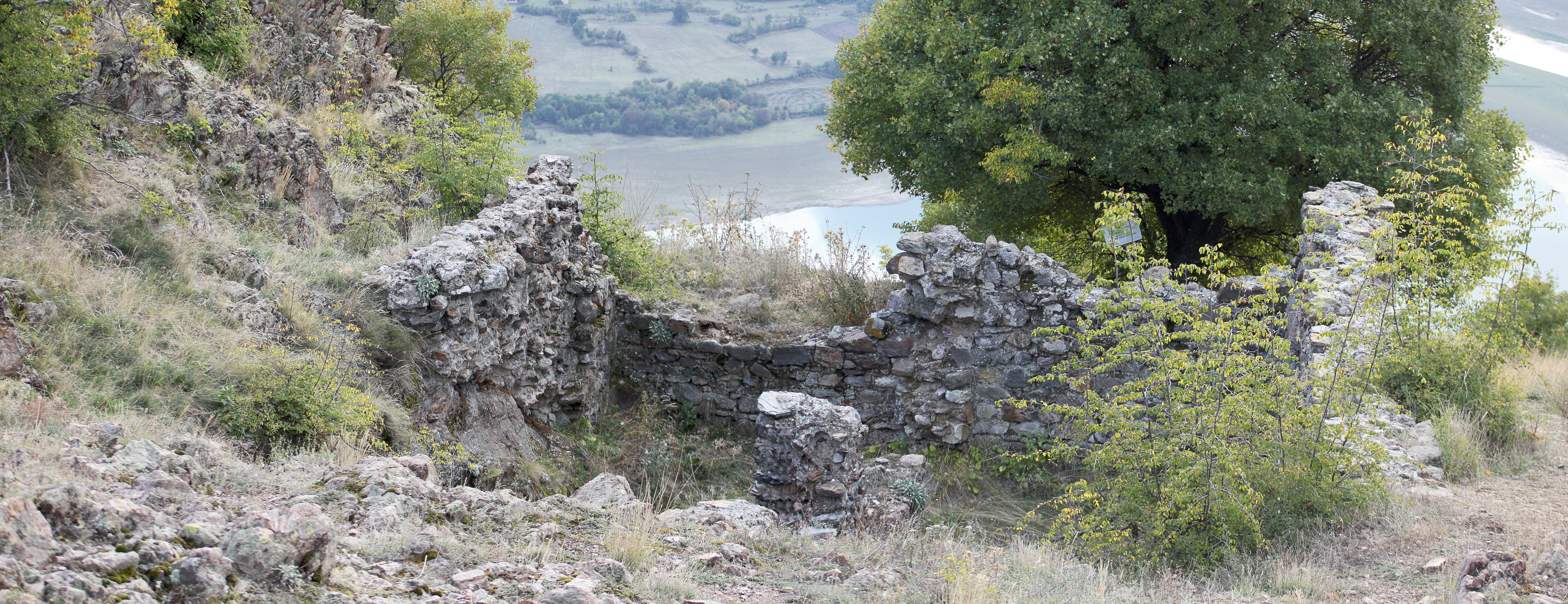
Ruins of the walls

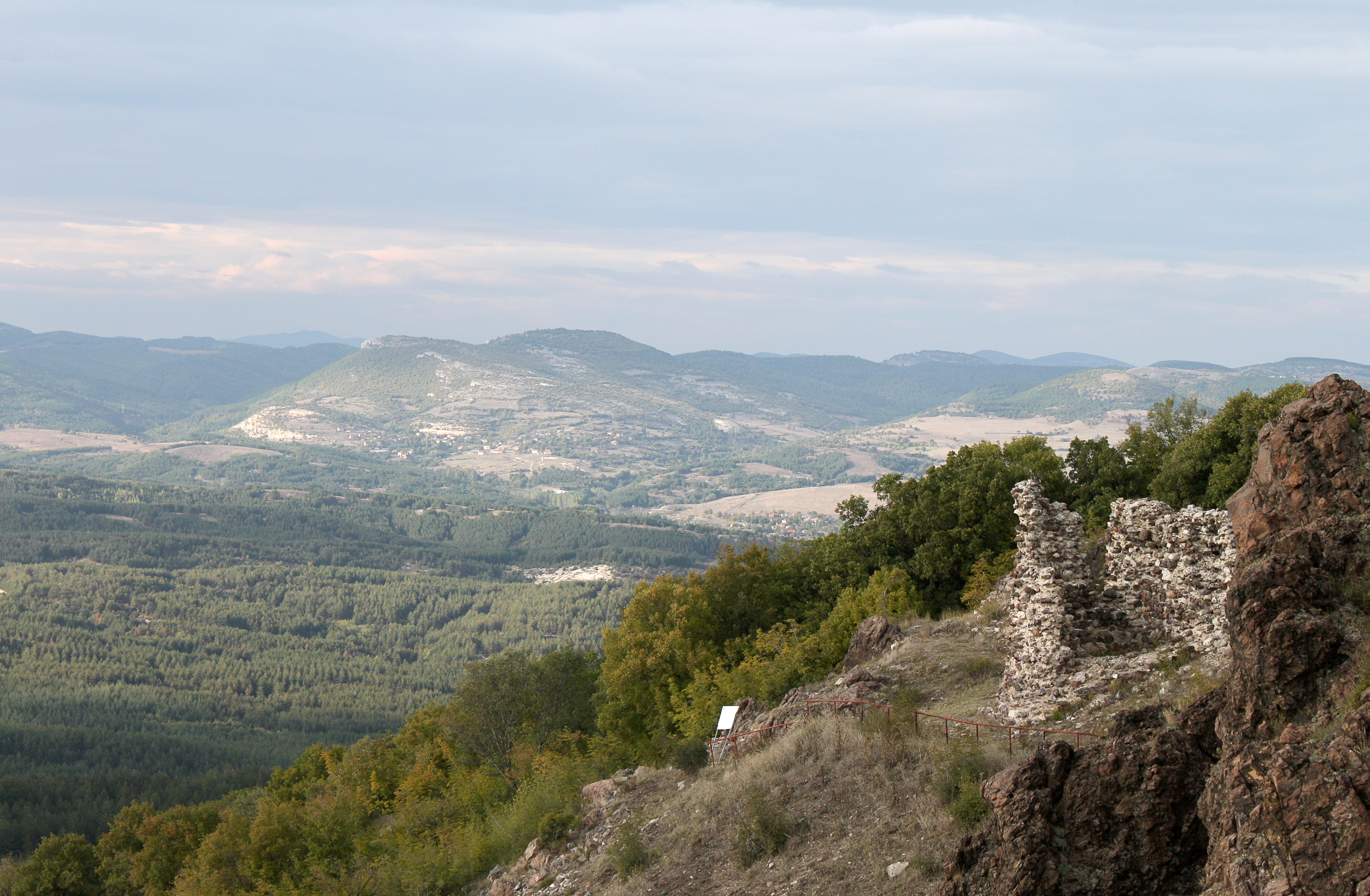
Ruins of Monyak

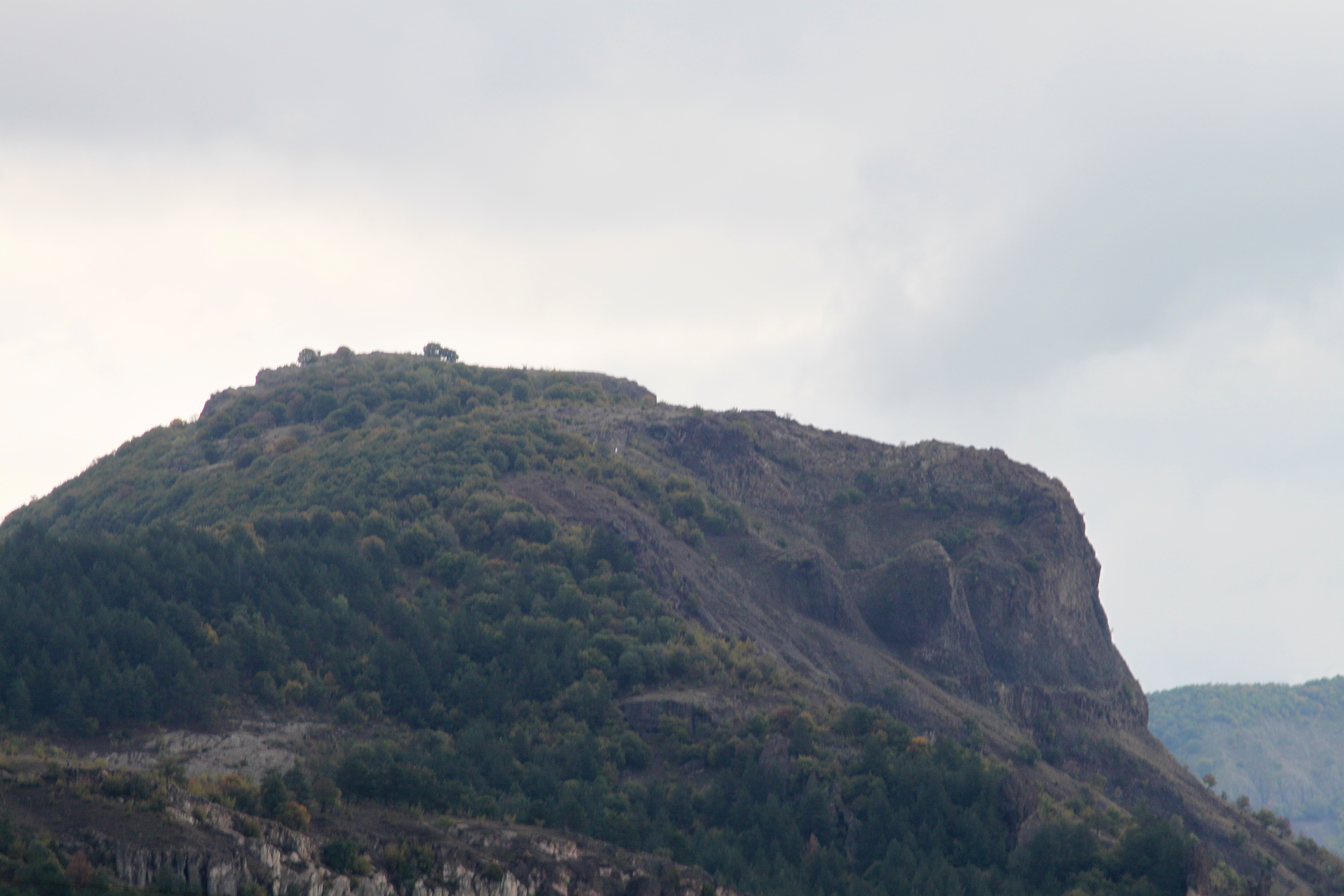
View of the hill

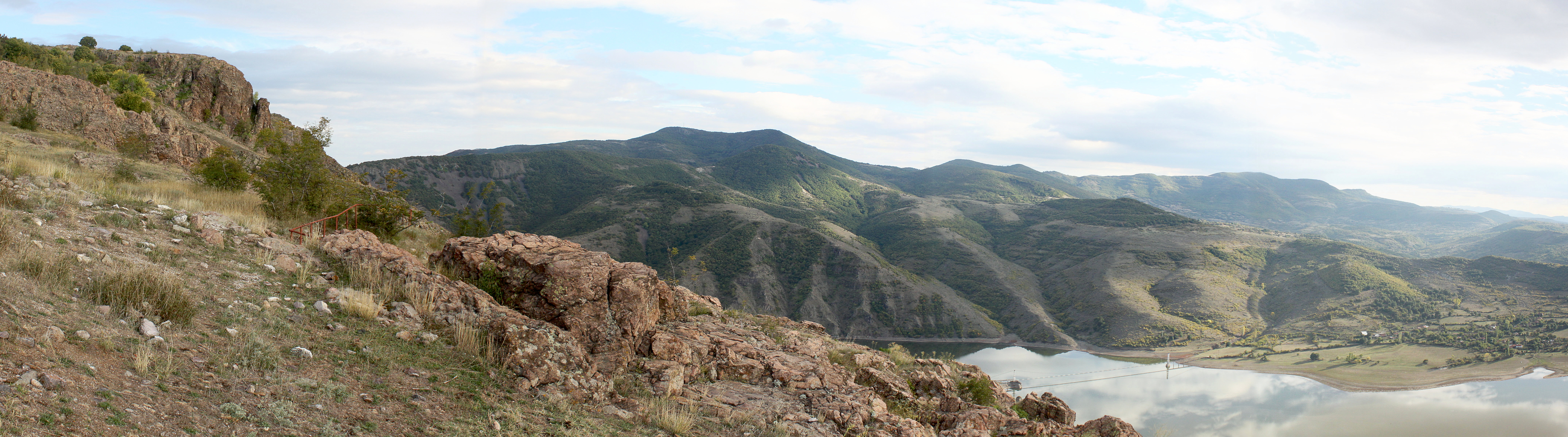
View towards the right bank of the Arda
