= Houben R.T. =

Houben R. T.
- Born: Houben Tcherkelov; January 23, 1970 (age 56); Kardzhali, Bulgaria
- Known for: Painting
- Movement: Postmodernism
- Website: houben.nyc

Houben Tcherkelov, (Bulgarian: Хубен Черкелов; known as Houben R.T.; American, born in Bulgaria on January 23, 1970) is a painter and experimental artist who lives and works in New York. In his early photographs, film, and installations post-communist Bulgaria and Bulgarian art is a recurrent theme. In his more recent work, Tcherkelov paints images from American and other national currencies using impasto, glaze, foil, acrylic and watercolor techniques. In all of his work the artist seeks to suggest the way in which symbolic images legitimize national power.

== Life and work ==
Houben Tcherkelov was born on January 23, 1970, in Kardzhali, a town in southeastern Bulgaria. Tcherkelov studied painting at the National Academy of Art in Sofia, Bulgaria's capital, and was associated with the radical movement around the XXL Gallery.

Tcherkelov's early works in Sofia analyze space and life structures in a society transitioning at once to a new social system and acclimating to the rapid pace of globalization. Freezing, a 1994 exhibit of frozen animals in Sofia's National Museum of Natural History (Bulgaria) pointed to the moribund state of museums in Bulgaria, grossly out of sync with the normal pace of events. Perhaps Tcherkelov's most well-known work from his series of interventions is Suitable Suit, a video still from which served as the cover of Menschenbilder: Foto- und Videokunst aus Bulgarien. In this video the artist lumbers through a field in a suit many sizes too large. Tcherkelov's analysis of Bulgarian society culminated in Reality Show (1998), a video that, with numerous art historical references, satirizes the affluence and decadence of the international film and music industry transferred to Sofia.

In 1995, Tcherkelov studied impasto painting with Jörg Immendorff in Amsterdam with a grant from the Felix Meritis Foundation. Not until he arrived in New York City in 2000, however, did he begin to work exclusively using this technique. Art critic Eleanor Heartney, in an introduction to Tcherkelov's series of impasto paintings based on images from currency, writes that they present "symbols mined from American currency as keys to understand national dreams and fantasies." Concentrating on details in both new and old forms of money, Tcherkelov "exhumes their meanings and contradictions, revealing the subliminal power that currency images have." Artist, musician, and performer Genesis P-Orridge writes of one of Tcherkelov's paintings that "it seemed to explode with sheer exuberance." He continues: "We wonder how the artist trapped a living spirit inside the painting and yet maintained its happiness!".

Tcherkelov cites the panic in the Bulgarian banking sector in the 1990s, which forced the government to devaluate the national currency, the Lev, by removing three zeroes, as the initial impetus that drove his consideration, from an aesthetic perspective, of the symbolic power of money. He also points to his arrival in New York as an immigrant, and his reliance on coins to make calls from payphones, as having "left [him] with the feeling of communication," and that money is a component of expression. Cultural critic Georgette Gouveia notes that Houben's aesthetic "is related to 20th-century Pop Art, but rather than focus on manufactured Pepsi-Cola or Brillo boxes as Warhol famously did, he focuses on the financial instruments that are engines of wealth."

In 2011, Houben was selected to represent Bulgaria in the 54th Venice Biennale.

In February and March 2018, Houben held solo shows at the National Art Gallery (Bulgaria), Sofia Arsenal and the National Archaeological Museum (Bulgaria), both in Sofia. In interviews, Houben was asked to talk about the role of art in the age of digitalization and bitcoin. The mission of art "is in the statics - to stop the flying time, to talk with the past, and with the future," Tcherkelov stated. "To not turn into ephemera, unlike the built-in interchangeability of almost everything that surrounds us. In 25 years, artificial intelligence will make many professions redundant, but there will be room for traditional human activity that cannot be multiplied or created by robots."

From November 2020 through March 2021, Houben held a solo show at the Museum of Humour and Satire in Gabrovo, Bulgaria. The museum director, Margarita Dorovska, described Houben's works as "beyond generous to the viewer" who is "compelled to move around and is yet never certain to have seen it all." In order to experience Houben's works, "[o]ne has to move, to change their stance, to exhaust the spatial relations, and there will still be an elusive remainder."

During a solo show in Taiwan at InSian Gallery, Houben explained the inspiration for his work: "Now I am in New York, where nothing is produced anymore. Only financial services remain. This is why I want to reflect this in my art. In a way, I am a traditional painter painting everything around me. This is the influence of global finance."

As art critic Xi Chen, in an introduction to the catalogue for this exhibit, states, "The artist, through the financial symbols inherent in currency—and the collective memory such symbols reflect—references the fluid exchange and translation between art and finance." For the same exhibit, Christian Viveros-Fauné described Houben's oeuvre as a "global treasury" of images that "depict[s] money as a phenomenon that is . . . reflective" requiring that the viewer "look beneath the surface of a thing."
