= Vishegrad Fortress =

Medieval stronghold

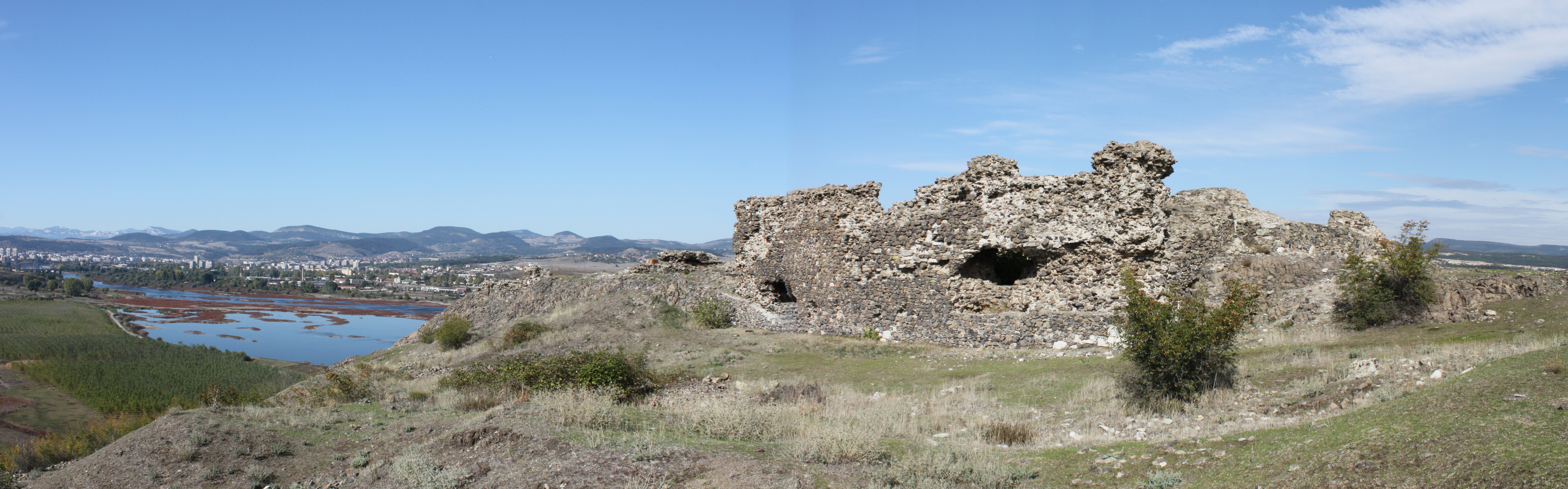
- Vishegrad Fortress

- Location within Bulgaria

General information
- Architectural style: Fortress
- Location: Vishegrad, Bulgaria
- Coordinates: 41°36′59.44″N 25°24′29.2″E
- Construction started: 4th–14th century

Vishegrad (Bulgarian: Вишеград) is a medieval fortress in the Rhodope Mountains of southern Bulgaria rising over a promontory in the valley of the river Arda. About one kilometer south on another hill lie the ruins of an ancient Thracian fort. Its name means High Town.

== Location ==
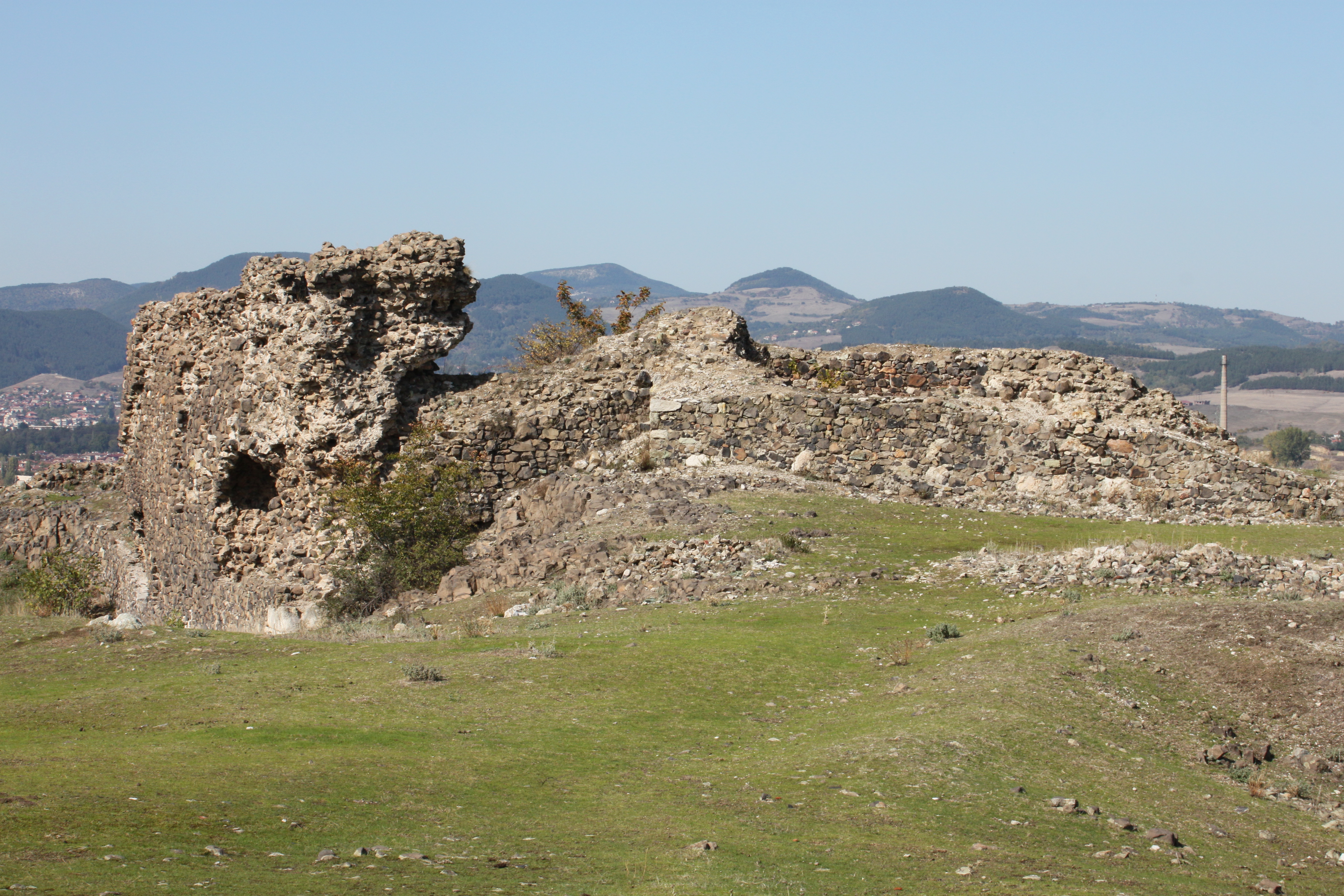
Ruins of Vishegrad

Vishegrad is located on a 306 m height rising on the right bank of the river Arda over the modern Studen Kladenets Reservoir. It lies in Kardzhali Province just north of the village of Vishegrad and 2 km east from the town of Kardzhali. From Vishegrad there is an excellent visibility towards the larger Monyak Fortress (587 m) on the left bank of the Arda some 4.5 km to the east, as well as to the fortress of the medieval Monastery of John the Precursor 2.5 km to the west. Both Vishegrad and Monyak and were likely constructed to the protect the region around the mouth of the river Varbitsa, which was part of the secondary road between the major cities of Philippopolis and Adrianople. The Thracian fortress is situated on the 369 m elevation of Harman Kaya a kilometer south. The two fortresses and the village are located on a curved slightly elevated line connected by natural saddles with a gentle slope to the river.

== Thracian fortress ==
The Thracian fortress on Harman Kaya had its origins in period between the Bronze Age and the Early Iron Age (1200–1100 BC), as evidenced by the earliest dated artifacts found during excavations. It is assumed that the fortress continued to function throughout Antiquity and the Middle Ages during the First and Second Bulgarian Empires.

From the east, south and west it is only accessible through a few places. The northern side is protected by a wall which has an arched shape, widened at the western end. The fortress walls and its interior were cleared during excavations that were carried out in 1971–1974. The walls are approximately 2 m thick and preserved to a height of 1 m. The masonry is made of rough stones, joined with mud mortar, and in some places the joints are filled with small pebbles and earth. The entrance to the fortress is located at the easternmost end and is about 2 m wide. In several places in the interior, dugout floors and furnace foundations were found. During the excavations fragments of clay vessels, iron implements and weapons were discovered.

== Medieval fortress ==
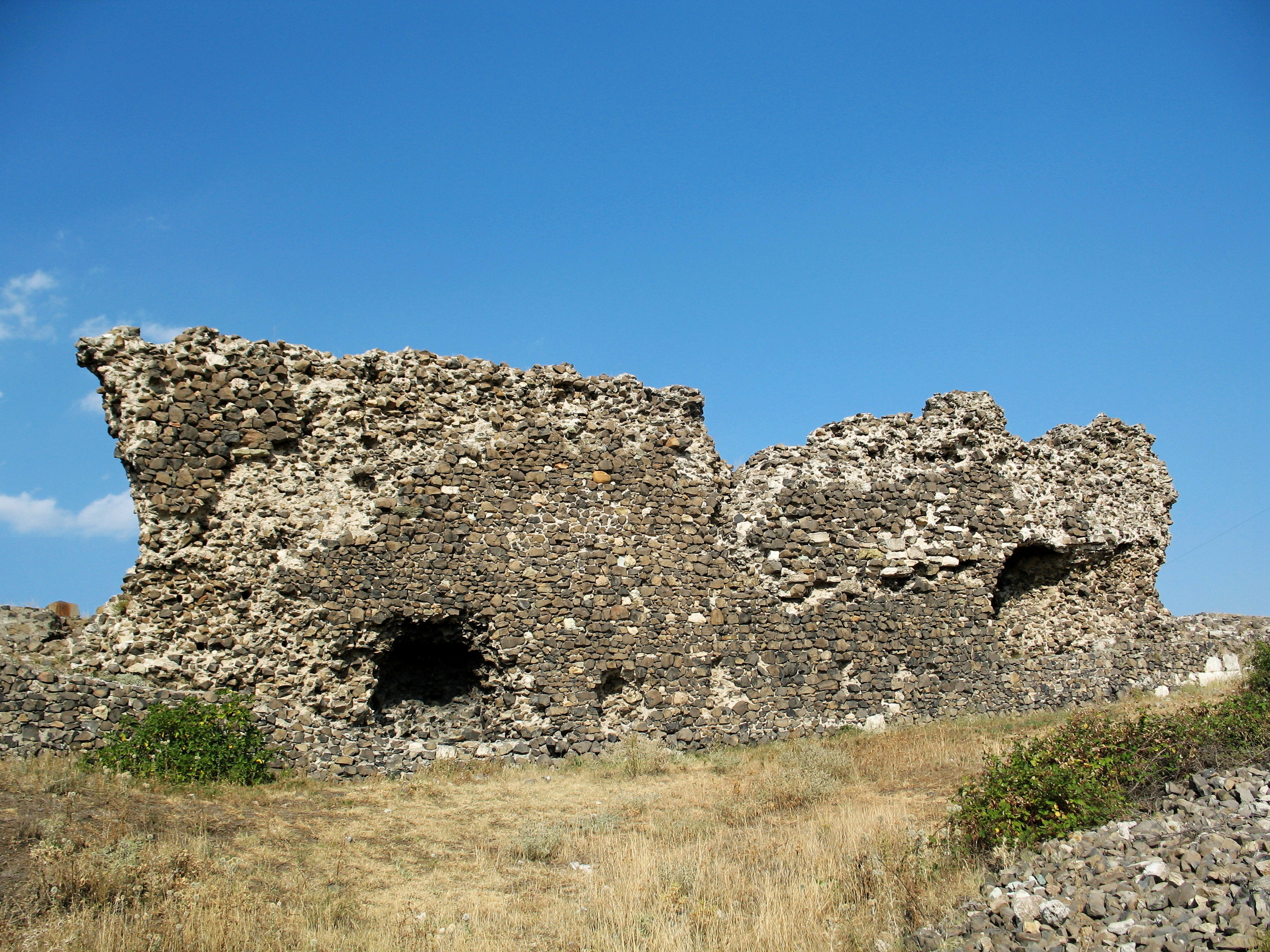
Section of the medieval wall

The medieval Vishgrad Fortress originated from the 4th century AD but all preserved structures date from the Middle Ages. It has common features with the material culture of old Bulgarian cities of the First and Second Empires, such as Pliska, Preslav, Tarnovo, Messembria, etc. The relatively well-preserved citadel was probably the residence of the governor of the medieval region of Achridos. Along with the nearby fortifications of the Monastery of John the Precursor and the adjacent medieval settlement that existed in the 9th–14th century, Vishegrad is considered to be the progenitor of the modern town of Kardzhali. The fortress was destroyed in the aftermath the Bulgarian–Ottoman wars in the 14th century.

The fortification is small, occupying an area of 560 m^{2}. The southern wall is 75 m long, 1.75 m wide at the top and is preserved to a height of up to 7 m. The fortress has two rectangular inner towers. One is at the eastern end of the structure. Its dimensions are 9.1x7.5 m, and its walls are 2.3 m thick. Later, a load-bearing wall was built through the middle of the room on the ground floor of the tower, which adjoined the southern wall of the tower with a well-defined joint. The walls are plastered with mortar mixed with broken brick. The ground floor was probably used as a water reservoir. The second tower is located in the middle of the south wall. There was probably a postern next to it. Its dimensions are 6.2x5.5 m, and the walls are 2.2 m thick. In the western half of the northern wall, an external stone staircase has been preserved, which served as an access the second floor of the tower, as the first one was used as a reservoir.

At a distance of 5 m from the southern wall, there is a second parallel wall, forming a 51 m long premise, which in later times was divided by transverse walls of broken stones joined with mud. Despite the impenetrable rock massif from the northern side of the hill, a defensive wall was built there as well, with which the fortress was enclosed by walls on all sides. That is the most deteriorated part of the stronghold. The main entrance is from the southeast and was initially 2.5 m wide, later narrowed by a wall to 1.2 m.

== Gallery ==
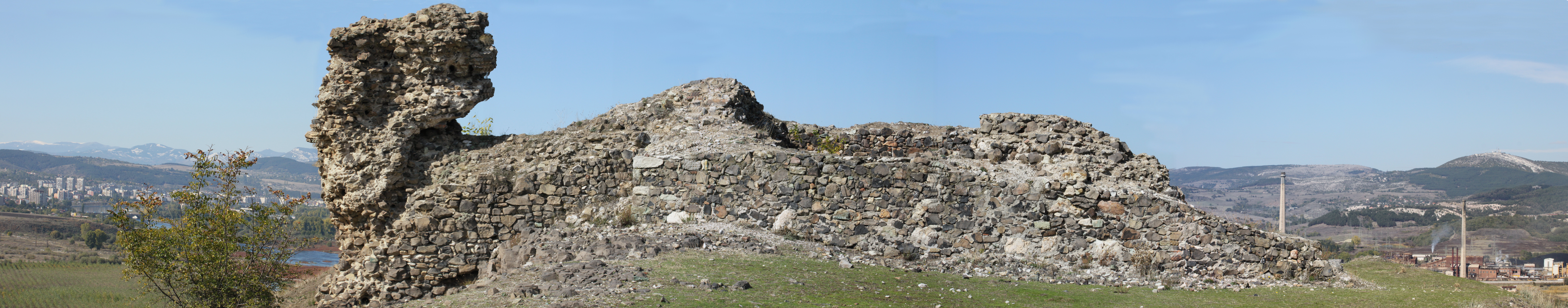
Panoramic view

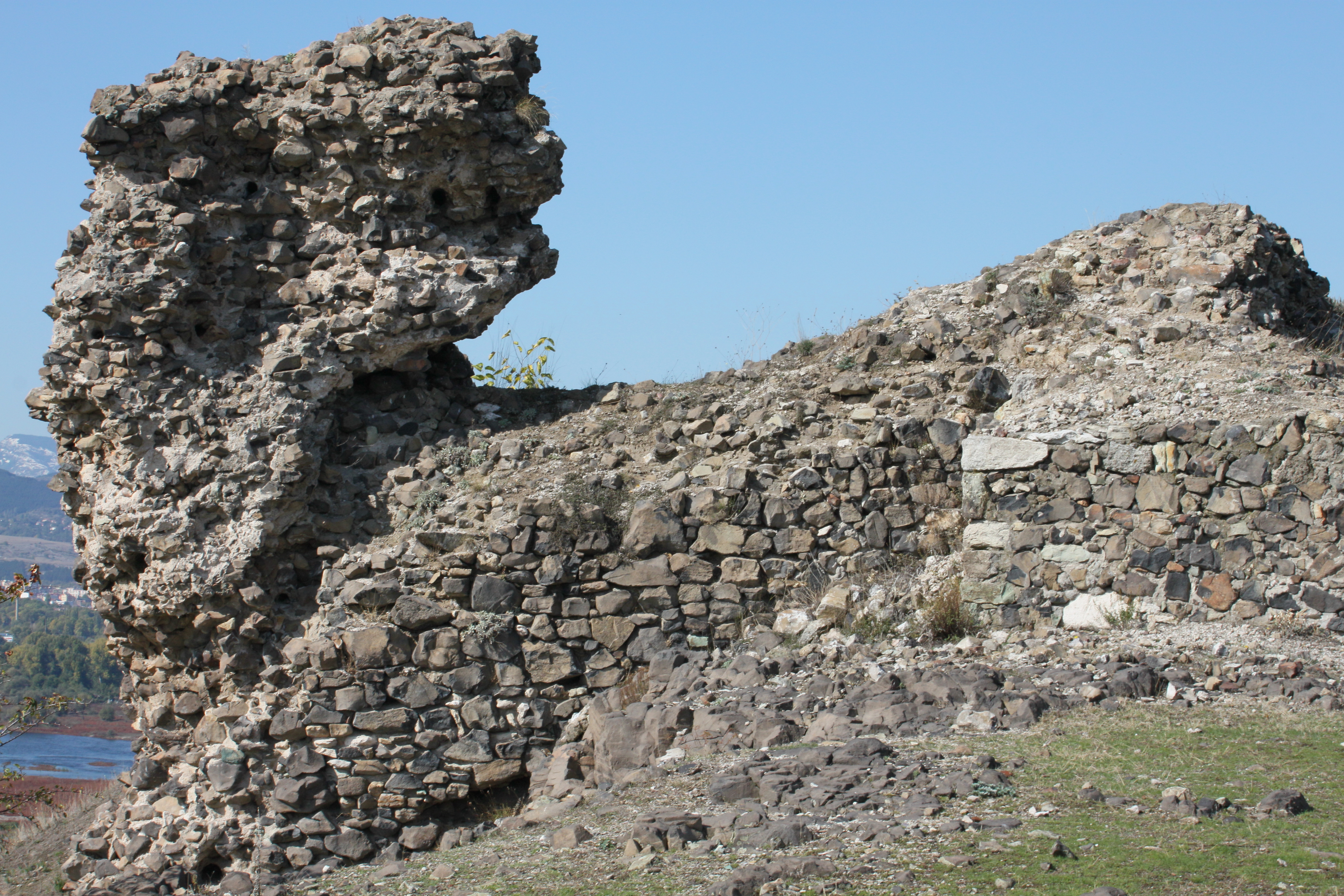
Ruins of Vishegrad

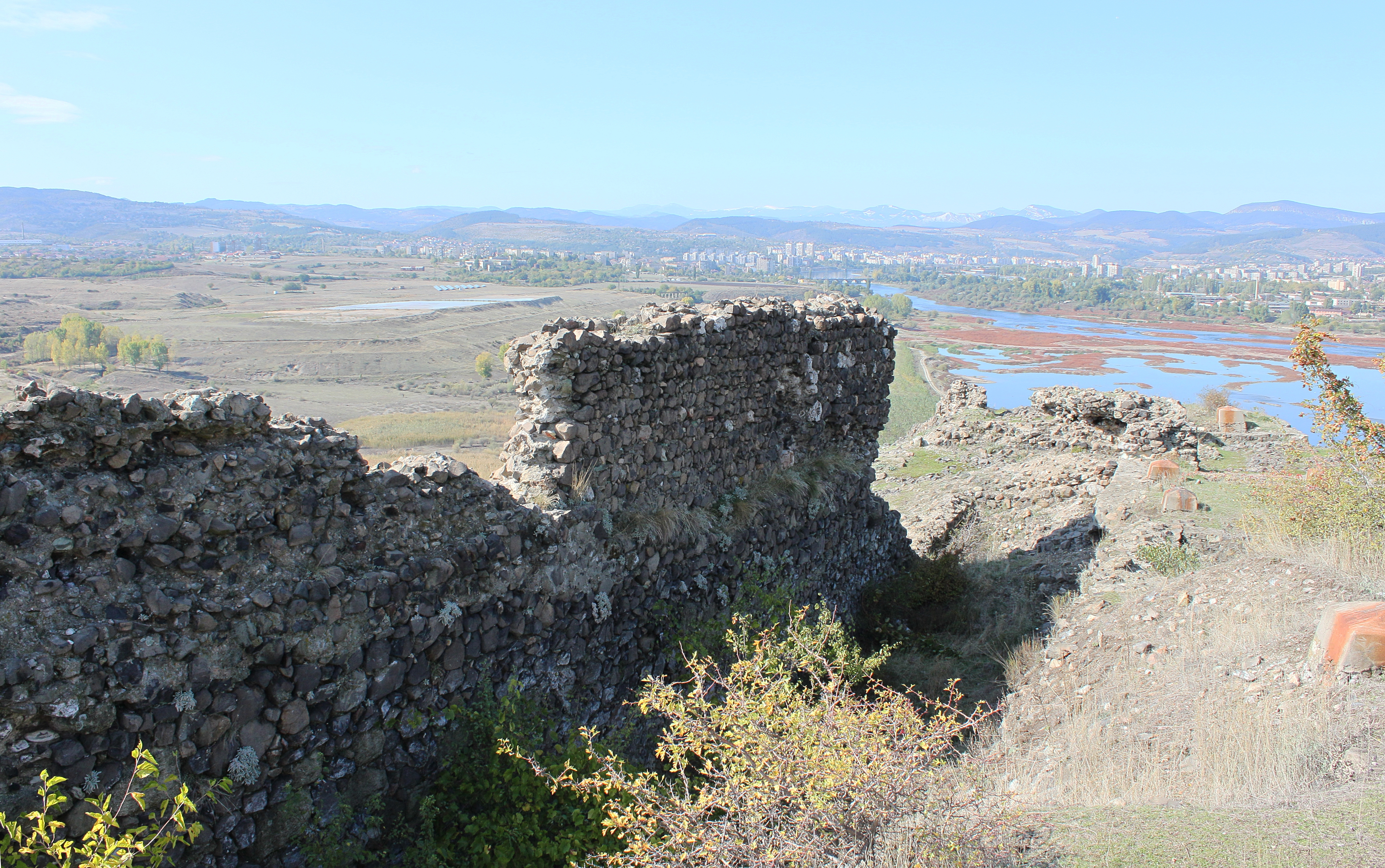
Ruins of Vishegrad

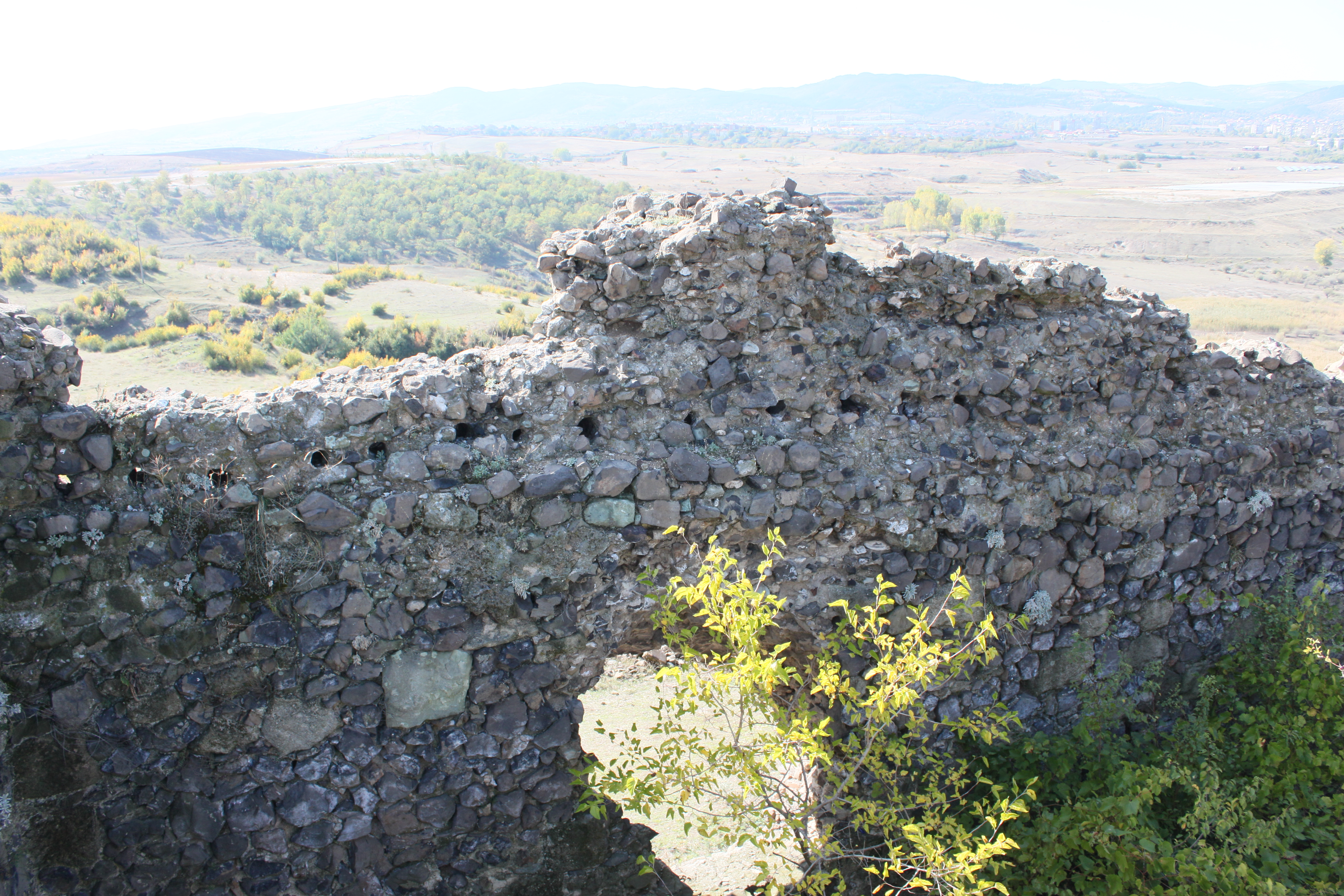
Ruins of Vishegrad
