= Studen Kladenets =

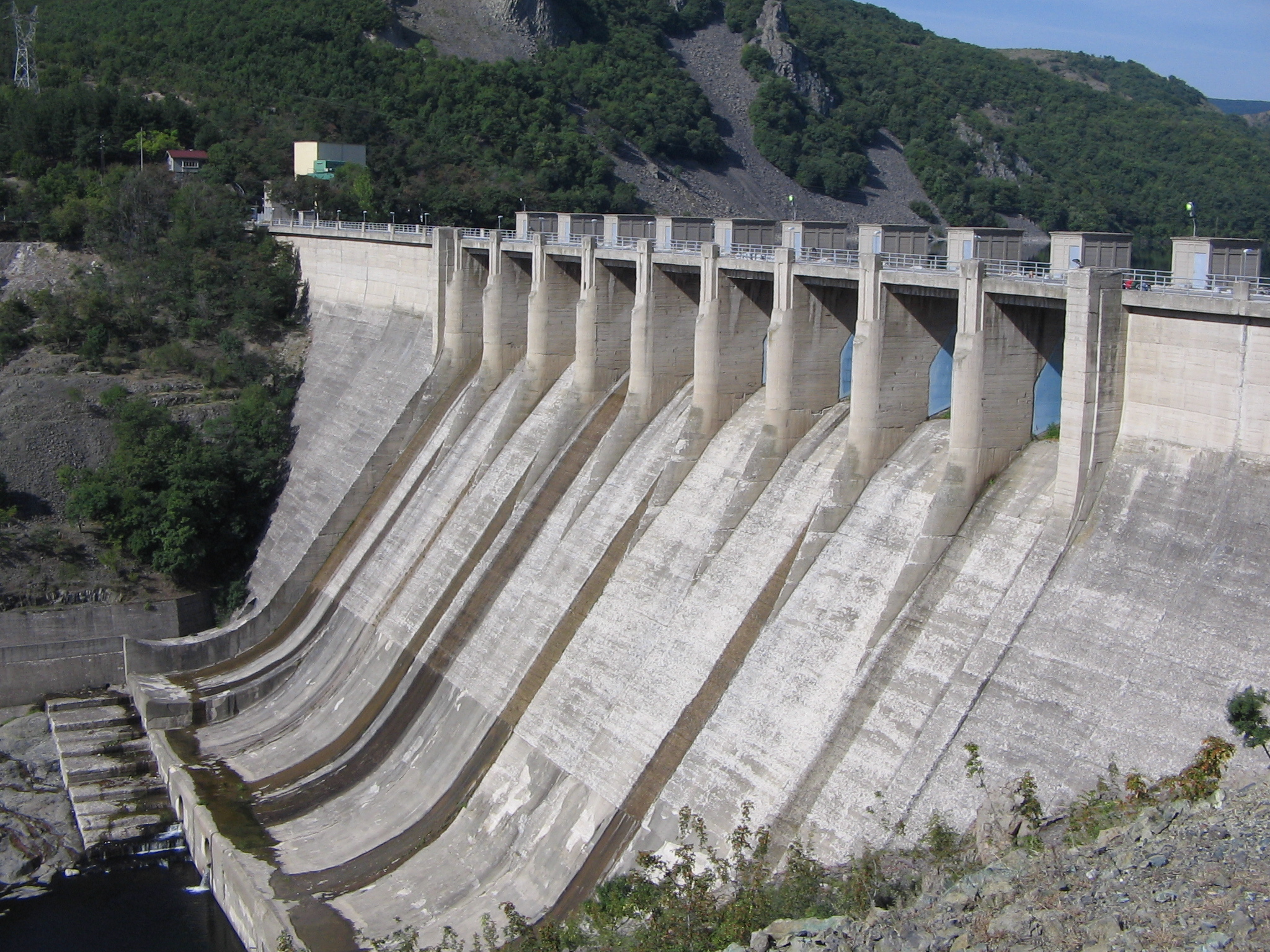
- Studen Kladenets Dam

- Location within Bulgaria
- Coordinates: 41°38′28″N 25°32′48″E
- Lake type: reservoir
- Primary inflows: Arda, Varbitsa River
- Primary outflows: Arda
- Catchment area: 3,707 km^{2} (1,431 sq mi)
- Basin countries: Bulgaria
- Max. length: 29 km (18 mi)
- Max. width: 1.5 km (0.93 mi)
- Surface area: 27.8 km^{2} (10.7 sq mi)
- Max. depth: 60 m (200 ft) (from dam height)
- Water volume: 388,000,000 m^{3} (1.37×10^{10} cu ft)
- Surface elevation: 227 m (745 ft)

The Studen Kladenets Reservoir (Bulgarian: язовир „Студен кладенец“, meaning "cold well") is the third largest reservoir by volume in Bulgaria after Iskar Dam and Kardzhali Dam. It is situated on the river Arda, and is created behind the Studen Kladenets dam, 30 km south-east of the town of Kardzhali. There are another two dams of the Arda - Kardzhali Dam to the west (upstream) and Ivaylovgrad Dam to the east (downstream). The dam is operated by the Bulgarian National Electric Company, NEK EAD.

The reservoir has a total volume of 388 million m^{3} and a drainage basin of 3,706 km^{2} and is 29 km long. It is situated at an average 227 m above sea level, its dam being 338 m long and 67.5 m high. The top of the dam consists of nine spillways, each one being 10.5 by 5 m. "Studen Kladenets" Hydroelectric Power Plant is situated appr. 1 km downstream of the dam. Initially the HPP had four Francis-type turbines, 15 MW each. А project for reconstruction and upgrading the HPP with another 16 MW turbine and a smaller eco-turbine underwent and after the completion, the total output reached 85 MW with annual production of 165 GWh of electricity.

Studen Kladenets reservoir is an attractive place for fishermen, where rudd is caught in great numbers. In its western part are located the ruins of the medieval Bulgarian fortresses of Monyak on the northern shore and Vishegrad on the southern shore.

The development of the reservoir has caused the local ecology to become artificially wetter and more humid, reducing the variety of types of land cover.

== History ==
The initial plans for the construction of a dam on the Arda date to as early as 1948. Construction began in 1955 and was completed in 1957. The HPP started electricity production in 1958.
