= Kardzhali Reservoir =

Kardzhali Dam
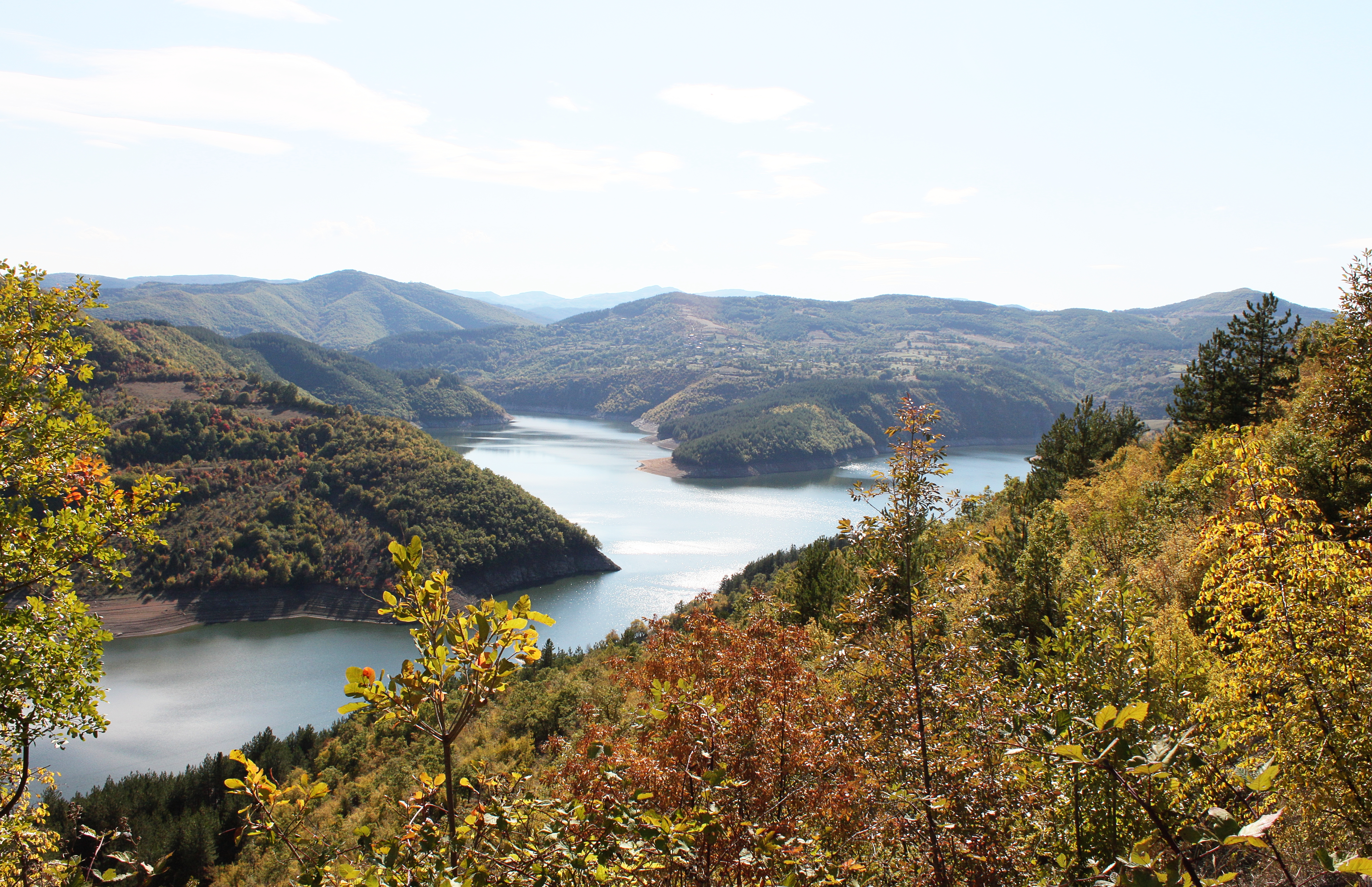
- Interactive map of Kardzhali Dam
- Official name: Язовир Кърджали
- Location: Kardzhali, Kardzhali Province, Bulgaria
- Coordinates: 41°38′01″N 25°20′26″E
- Purpose: Power generation, flood control, water storage, recreation
- Status: Operational
- Construction began: 1957
- Opening date: 1963
- Owner: Bulgarian Government
- Operator: NEK EAD

Dam and spillways
- Type of dam: Arch-gravity dam
- Impounds: Arda River
- Height: 103.5 m (340 ft)
- Length: 402.89 m (1,321.8 ft)
- Elevation at crest: 331.45 m (1,087.4 ft)
- Spillway type: 4 Spill valves 4 Gates
- Spillway capacity: Valves: 3,100 m^{3}/s (110,000 cu ft/s); Gates: 880 m^{3}/s (31,000 cu ft/s)

Reservoir
- Creates: Kardzhali Reservoir
- Total capacity: 497,200,000 m^{3} (403,100 acre⋅ft)
- Catchment area: 1,882 km^{2} (727 sq mi)
- Surface area: 16.07 km^{2} (6.20 sq mi)
- Normal elevation: 324.3 m (1,064 ft)

Power Station
- Operator: NEK EAD
- Hydraulic head: 93 m (305 ft) maximum
- Turbines: 4
- Installed capacity: 122 MW
- Annual generation: 160 million kWh

Kardzhali Reservoir (Bulgarian: язовир Кърджали, romanized: yazovir Kardzhali) is an artificial lake and a hydroelectric dam in southern Bulgaria. It is the uppermost of the three major reservoirs of the Arda Hydropower Cascade, the others being Studen Kladenets and Ivaylovgrad. It is the second largest reservoir by volume in the country after the Iskar.

== Geography ==
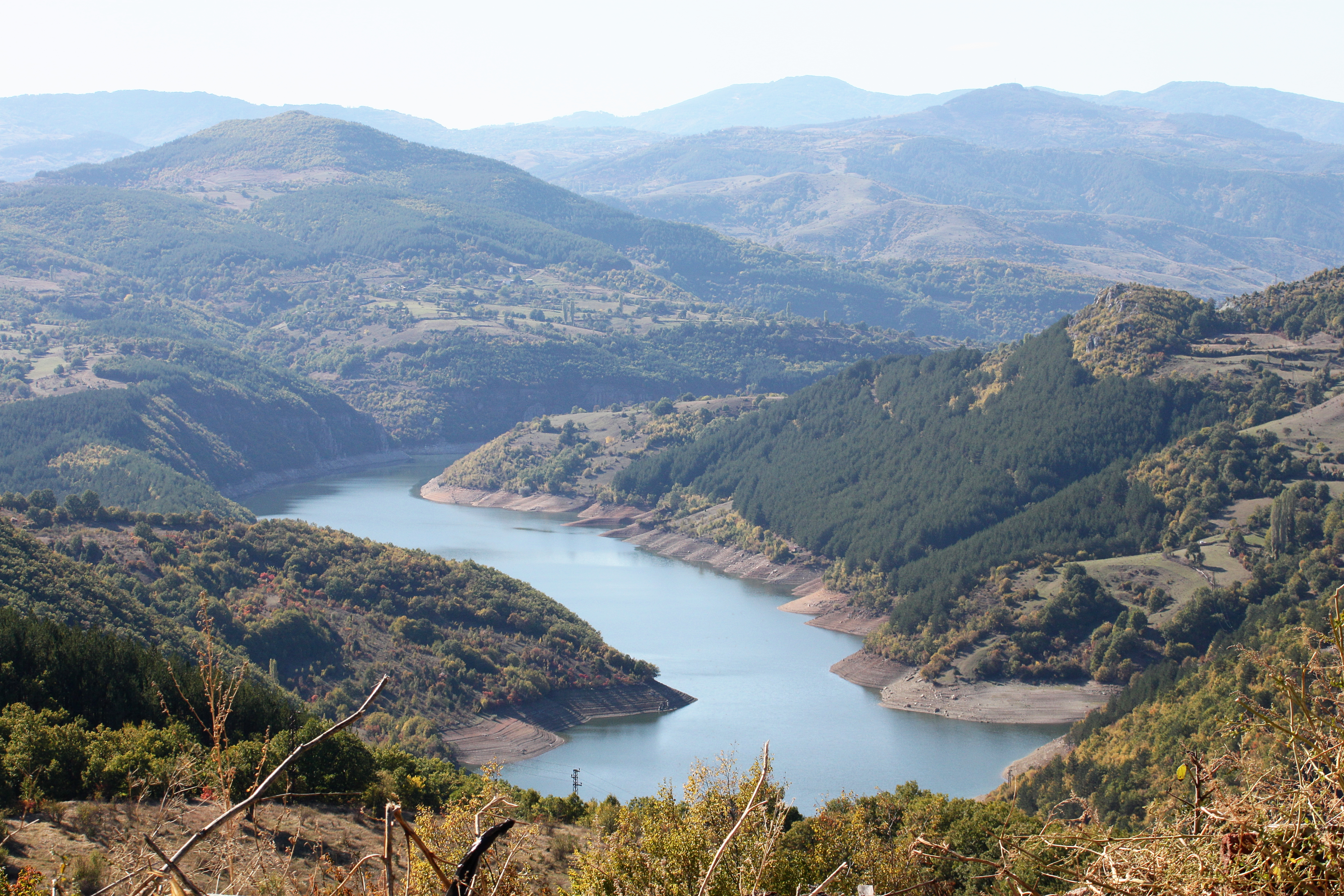
A view near the village of Duzhdovnitsa

The reservoir is located at an altitude of 331 m in the eastern Rhodope Mountains on the major river Arda, a right tributary of the Maritsa. In the western part it receives the Borovitsa, an important left tributary of the Arda. Its dam is about a kilometer west of the town of Kardzhali. Administratively, it lies in Kardzhali Province, within the territory of the villages of Brosh, Duzhdovnitsa, Enchets, Glavatartsi, Kamenartsi, Kokoshane, Pudartsi, Ridovo, Snezhinka, Staro myasto, Strazhevtsi, Topolchane, Zelenikovo, Zvanika in Kardzhali Municipality, and Suhovo, Ribartsi, Doyrantsi, Star chitak, Borovitsa, Kitnitsa and Avramovo in Ardino Municipality. It is accessible via the first class I-5 road from the town of Kardzhali.

Kardzhali Reservoir is an important tourist destination for fishing and various outdoors activities that support a local hospitality industry. Some of the landmarks along its shores include the horseshoe meander Zavoya and the ruins of the medieval Patmos Fortress.

== Dam ==
Most of the construction process took place in the period 1957–1963, however due to serious geological challenges construction works continued until 1976. It has a concrete arch–gravity dam, the only one in Bulgaria. The maximum height of the dam wall from the base is 103.5 m, the third highest in the country, and the length along the crown is 344 m. The dam spillway with a capacity of 3,100 m^{3}/s is built directly next to the right abutment block of its wall and is equipped with 4 valves. The dam has two main outlets, built into the left and right diversion tunnels, which have a capacity of 880 m^{3}/s. During the strengthening works of the wall in the 1970s, an additional tunnel outlet was built in the right slope with a water intake tower and a shaft with gate valves with a capacity of 1,670 m^{3}/s.

Kardzhali Reservoir spans a territory of 16.4 km^{2} and has a catchment area of 1,882 km^{2}. The projected volume is 532 million m^{3} but due to sediment accumulation it is estimated that as of 2001 the volume is 497.2 million m^{3}. The sediment accumulation since has declined due to the reduction of mining activity in the area and the construction of the Plovdivtsi Reservoir further upstream.

The Kardzhali Hydroelectric Power Station is located in the dam wall. Following modernisation works in 2007–2010, its capacity was increased to 122 MW from the original 106 MW. The reservoir is also utilized to irrigation and industrial water supply for the industry in the town of Kardzhali.

== Gallery ==
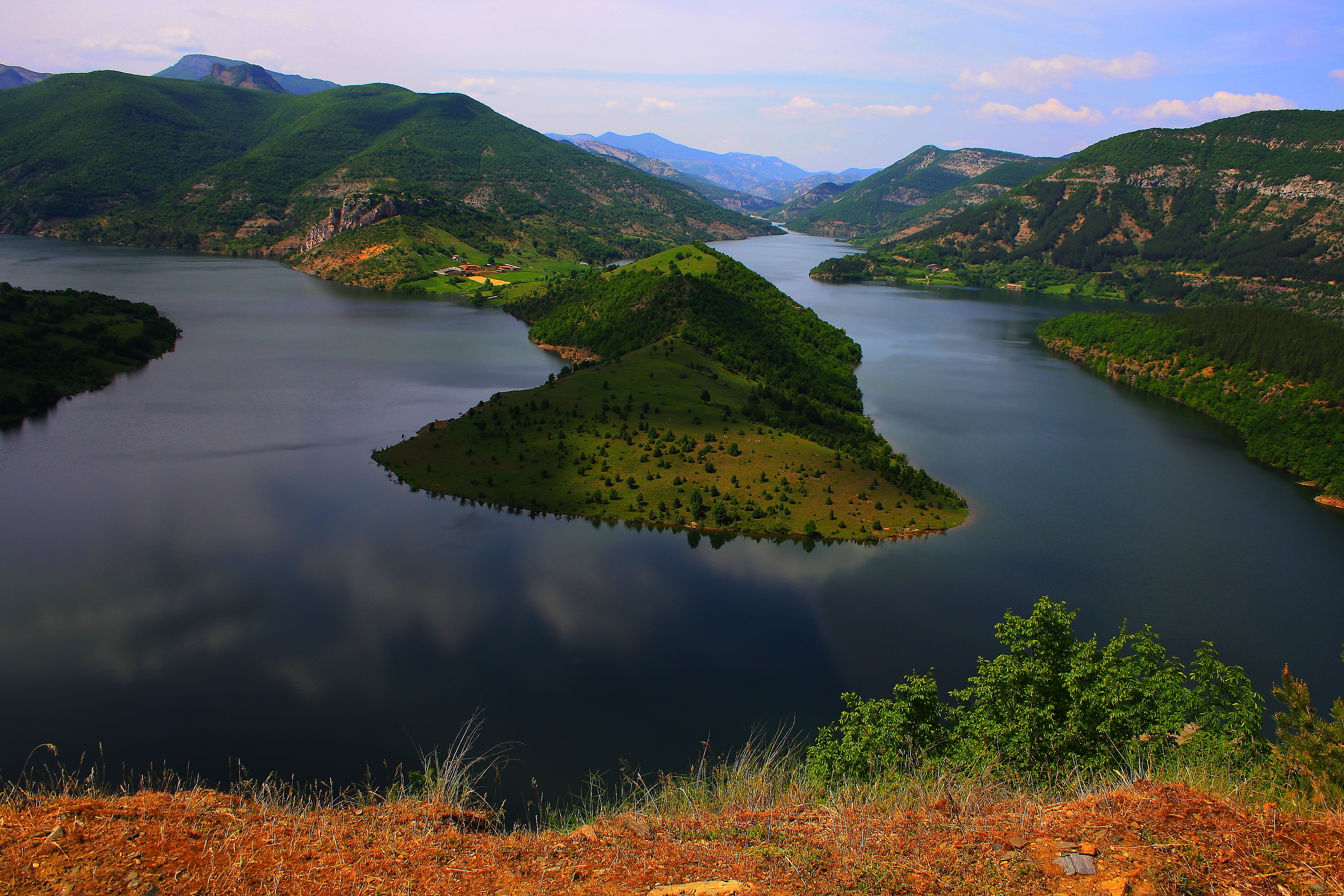
The Zavoya meander

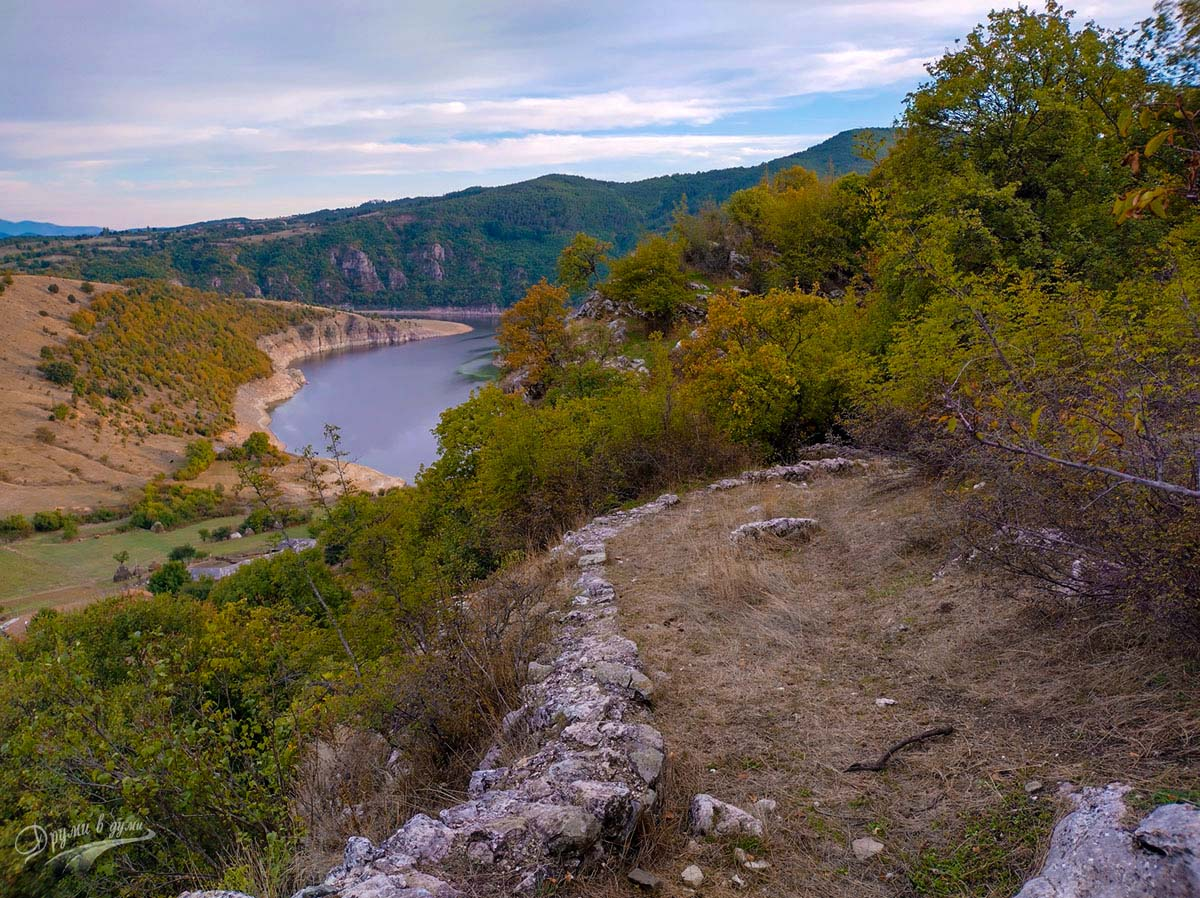
A view from the ruins of the Patmos Fortress

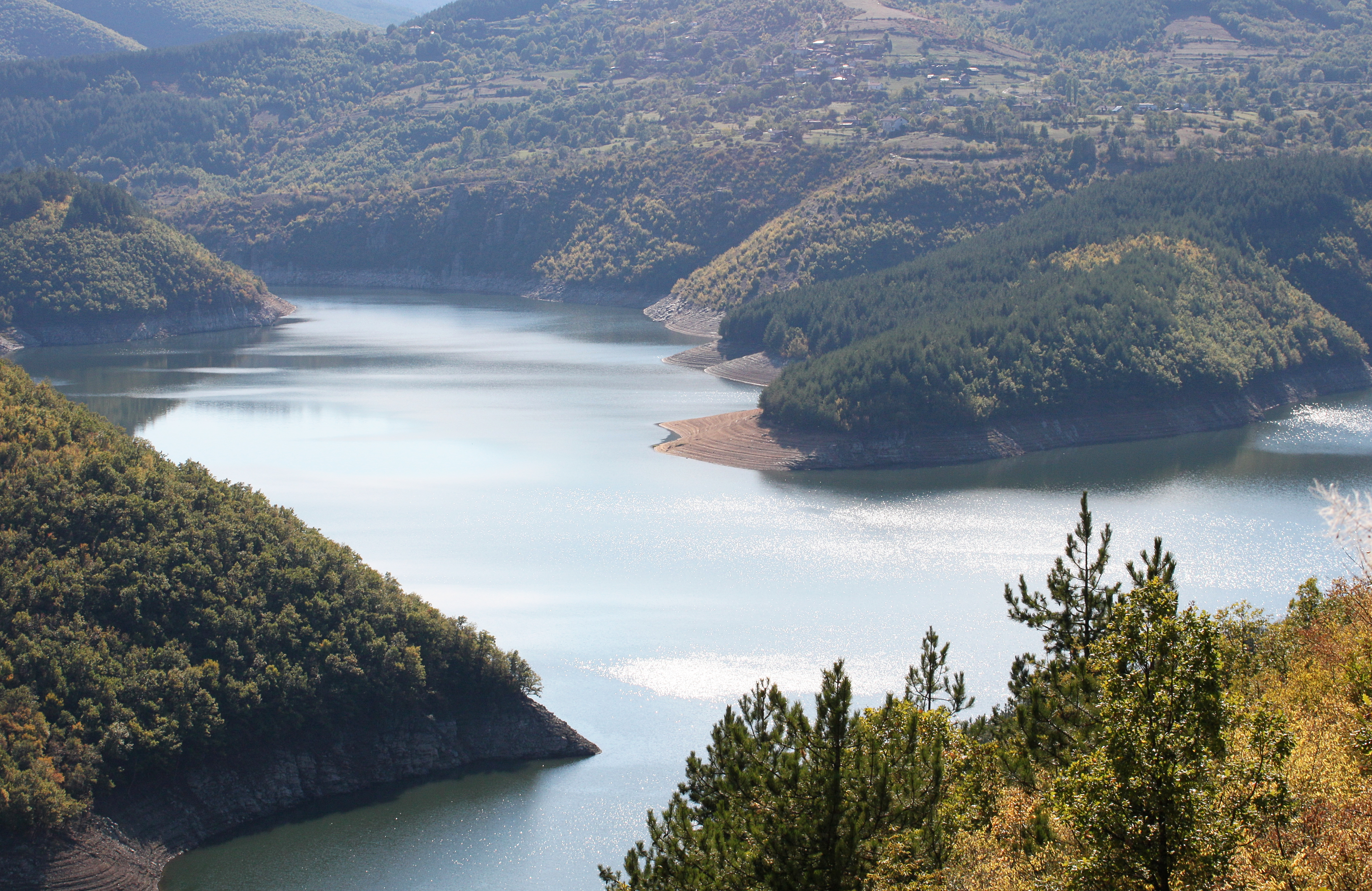
A view of the reservoir

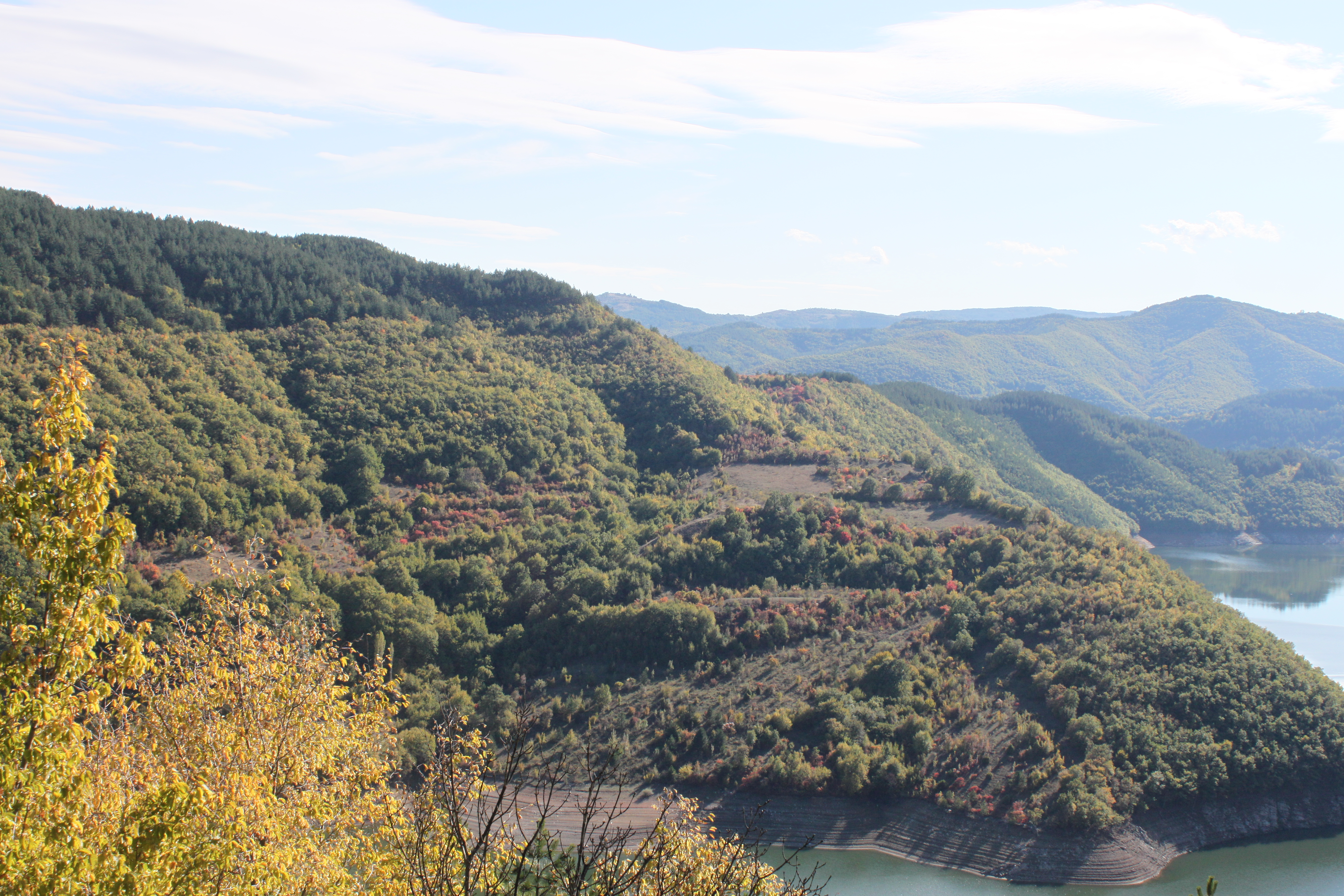
Forested slopes above the reservoir
