= Dobrinovo =

Dobrinovo may refer to:

- in Bulgarian (the name is written Добриново) :
  - Dobrinovo, Burgas Province, a village in the Karnobat Municipality
  - Dobrinovo, Kardzhali Province, a village in the Kardzhali Municipality
