= Zelenikovo =

Zelenikovo may refer to the following places:

== Bulgaria ==
- Zelenikovo, Kardzhali Province
- Zelenikovo, Plovdiv Province

== North Macedonia ==
- Zelenikovo, North Macedonia
- Zelenikovo Municipality
