= Lisitsite =

Lisitsite Лисиците
- Village
- Location within Bulgaria
- Coordinates: 41.6000°N 25.4500°E
- Country: Bulgaria
- Province: Kardzhali Province
- Municipality: Kardzhali
- Time zone: UTC+2 (EET)
  - Summer (DST): UTC+3 (EEST)

Lisitsite is a village in Kardzhali Municipality, Kardzhali Province, southern Bulgaria.

The village is located in Rhodope Mountains on the banks of the Arda river. The village can only be reached by Bulgaria's longest suspension bridge, which crosses the reservoir of the Studen Kladenets Dam. A Thracian fortress is located 100 meters south of the village, about 15 km southeast of Kardzhali. Nearby is the mythical area of Dambala.
