= Suhovo =

Coordinates: 41°39′N 25°16′E

- Village
- Interactive map of Suhovo
- Country: Bulgaria
- Province: Kardzhali Province
- Municipality: Ardino

Area
  - Total: 2.899 km^{2} (1.119 sq mi)

Population (2013)
  - Total: 97
- Time zone: UTC+2 (EET)
  - Summer (DST): UTC+3 (EEST)

Suhovo (Bulgarian: Сухово) is a village in Ardino Municipality, Kardzhali Province, southern-central Bulgaria. It covers an area of 2.899 square kilometres and as of 2013 it had a population of 97 people.

== Landmarks ==
Located about 10 kilometers to the northeast, the Kardzhali Dam is a major structure in the region. This spot serves as a hub for various water activities. Nearby accommodations include hotels, villas, and restaurants. A new pedestrian bridge spans the dam, connecting Suhovo and Duzhdovnitsa.

Floating pontoons in the area provide dining options with a focus on fish dishes. Additional activities include jet rides, water wheels, and water skiing. A rowing base is also available for use.

Fishing at the dam is well-established, with species such as carp, catfish, tolostolob, zander, perch, and rudd available.

Around 52 kilometers northeast lies Perperikon, a historical site recognized among the 100 National Tourist Sites. This location features a significant megalithic sanctuary.
