= Chubrika =

- Village
- Location within Bulgaria
- Coordinates: 41°35′19″N 25°12′31″E
- Country: Bulgaria
- Province: Kardzhali Province
- Municipality: Ardino

Area
  - Total: 5.782 km^{2} (2.232 sq mi)

Population (2007)
  - Total: 153
- Time zone: UTC+2 (EET)
  - Summer (DST): UTC+3 (EEST)

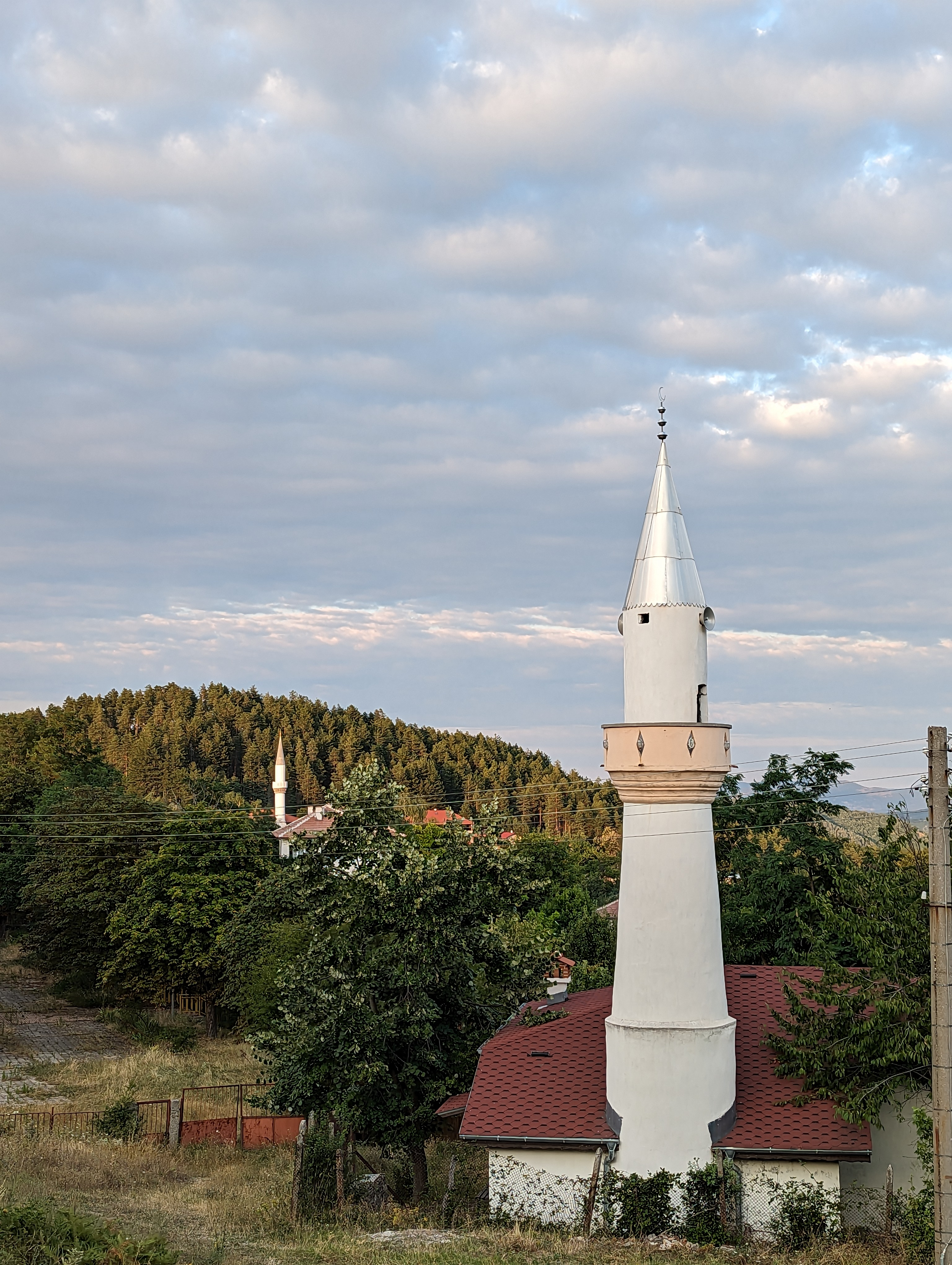
Mosque in Chubrika

Chubrika (Bulgarian: Чубрика) is a village in Ardino Municipality, Kardzhali Province, southern-central Bulgaria. It is located 199.97 kilometres (124.26 mi) from Sofia, roughly 21.3 kilometres (13.2 mi) by road southwest of the city of Kardzhali, and roughly 13 kilometres (8.1 mi) by road east of the municipal town of Ardino. To the north is Yabalkovets and to the northeast is Kobilyane, along the 865 road. It covers an area of 5.782 square kilometres (2.232 sq mi) and as of 2007 had a population of 153 people. It was formerly called Fakrŭ Bunar.

== Landmarks ==
In the vicinity of Chubrika, around 13 kilometers to the southwest, the Eagle Rocks area contains a Thracian sanctuary. Dating from the 4th to 6th centuries BC, this site includes a large rock with approximately 90 trapezoidal niches. These niches were used for placing pottery and tiles related to ancient burial practices.

Nearby, the ruins of the Kaleto fortress are located about 500 meters from the sanctuary. This fortress, now a protected cultural monument, represents a significant historical site in the region.

Approximately 19 kilometers northwest of Chubrika, near the village of Bashevo, stands the Krivus fortress. Built in the 10th century, the fortress was intended to defend the area around the Arda River. The structure includes well-preserved fortifying walls, towers, an entrance, and the remains of an ancient church.

In close proximity to the Krivus fortress, on a rocky peninsula along the left bank of the Borovica River, lies the Fortress of Patmos. This fortress, also from the 10th century, is noted for its western wall, which remains largely intact. Archaeological excavations at this site have revealed remains of a basilica and a tower.

To the north of Dyadovtsi, about 14 kilometers, is the Devil's Bridge. This bridge, constructed in the early 16th century, has not undergone any major reconstruction over the past 500 years. Notably, the central arch of the bridge features an engraved hexagon, referred to as "The Seal of Solomon."
