= Duzhdino =

Dazhdino Дъждино
- Village
- Location within Bulgaria
- Coordinates: 41.5833°N 25.3667°E
- Country: Bulgaria
- Province: Kardzhali Province
- Municipality: Kardzhali
- Time zone: UTC+2 (EET)
  - Summer (DST): UTC+3 (EEST)

Dazhdino is a village in Kardzhali Municipality, Kardzhali Province, southern Bulgaria.
