= Sestrinsko =

Coordinates: 41.7167°N 25.6333°E

Sestrinsko Сестринско
- Village
- Interactive map of Sestrinsko
- Country: Bulgaria
- Province: Kardzhali Province
- Municipality: Kardzhali
- Time zone: UTC+2 (EET)
  - Summer (DST): UTC+3 (EEST)

Sestrinsko is a village in Kardzhali Municipality, Kardzhali Province, southern Bulgaria.
