= Brosh =

Brosh may refer to:

== Places ==
- Brosh, Israel
- Brosh, Kardzhali Province, Bulgaria

== People ==
- Aline Brosh McKenna (born 1967), American screenwriter
- Allie Brosh (born 1985), American cartoonist and blogger
- Nili Brosh, Israeli guitarist
- Nina Brosh (born 1975), Israeli model and actress
- Ethan Brosh, American heavy metal guitarist
