= Dolishte =

Dolishte Долище
- Village
- Location within Bulgaria
- Coordinates: 41.6833°N 25.6000°E
- Country: Bulgaria
- Province: Kardzhali Province
- Municipality: Kardzhali

Population (2017)
  - Total: ▼71
- Time zone: UTC+2 (EET)
  - Summer (DST): UTC+3 (EEST)

Dolishte is a village in Kardzhali Municipality, Kardzhali Province, southern Bulgaria.

== Population ==
According to the 2011 census, the village of Dolishte has 77 inhabitants, down from its peak of 261 in 1965. Nearly all inhabitants are ethnic Turks (97%).
