= Penyovo =

Penyovo Пеньово
- Village
- Location within Bulgaria
- Coordinates: 41.6833°N 25.3000°E
- Country: Bulgaria
- Province: Kardzhali Province
- Municipality: Kardzhali
- Time zone: UTC+2 (EET)
  - Summer (DST): UTC+3 (EEST)

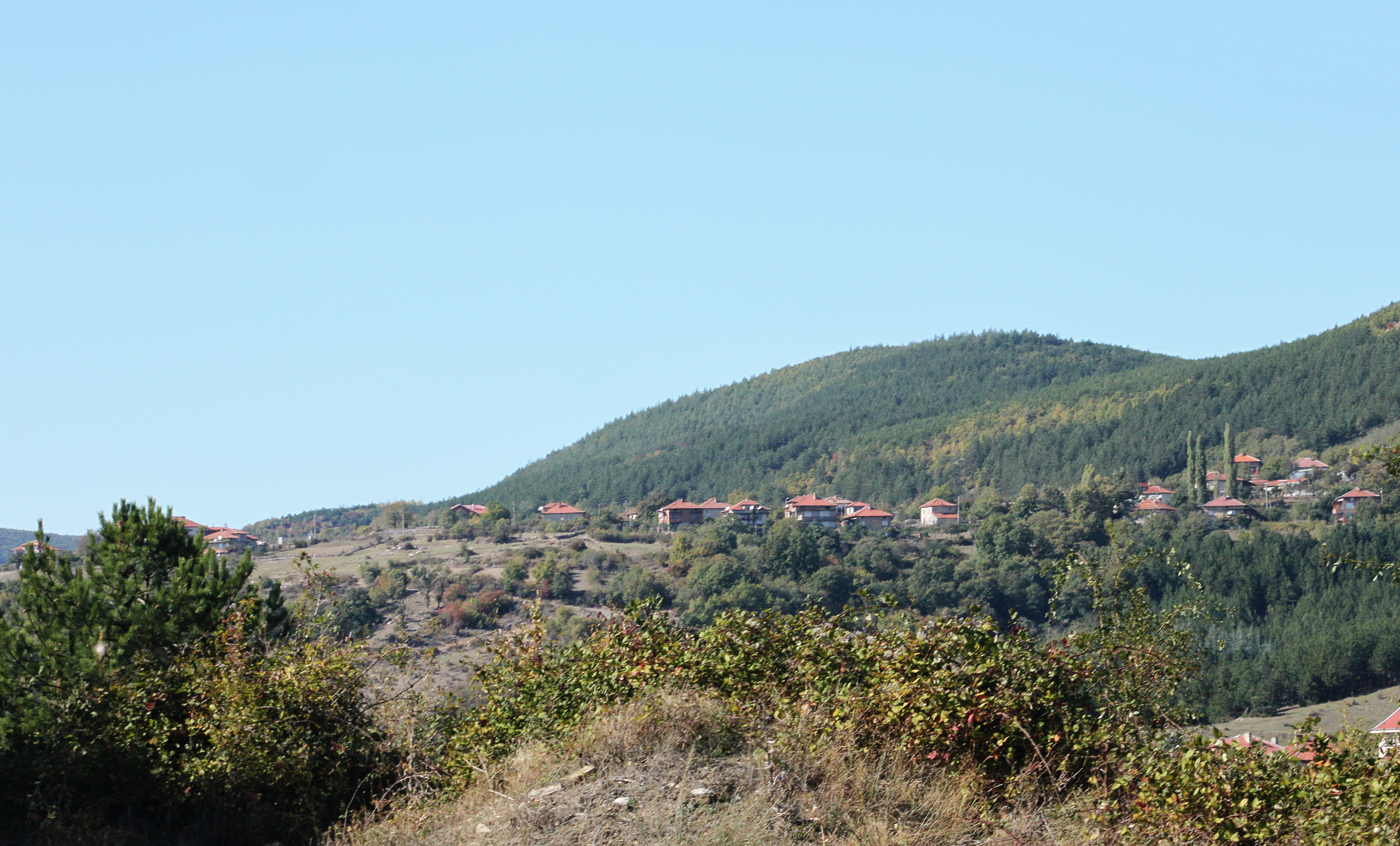
Penyovo, as seen in 2011

Penyovo is a village in Kardzhali Municipality, Kardzhali Province, southern Bulgaria.
