= Tatkovo =

Tatkovo Татково
- Village
- Location within Bulgaria
- Coordinates: 41.7333°N 25.5833°E
- Country: Bulgaria
- Province: Kardzhali Province
- Municipality: Kardzhali
- Elevation: 311 m (1,020 ft)

Population (2013)
  - Total: 62
- Time zone: UTC+2 (EET)
  - Summer (DST): UTC+3 (EEST)
- Postal code: 6670

Tatkovo is a village in Kardzhali Municipality, Kardzhali Province, southern Bulgaria.
