= Avramovo =

Avramovo is the name of several settlements in Bulgaria:

- Avramovo, Blagoevgrad Province
- Avramovo, Kardzhali Province
