= Avramovo, Kardzhali Province =

Avramovo
- Hamlet
- Location within Bulgaria
- Coordinates: 41°42′0″N 25°10′1″E
- Country: Bulgaria
- Province: Kardzhali Province
- Municipality: Ardino

Area
  - Total: 6.197 km^{2} (2.393 sq mi)

Population (2007)
  - Total: 6
- Time zone: UTC+2 (EET)
  - Summer (DST): UTC+3 (EEST)

Avramovo (Bulgarian: Аврамово) is a village in Ardino Municipality, Kardzhali Province, in southern-central Bulgaria. It is located 187.5 kilometres (116.5 mi) from Sofia, roughly 14 kilometres (8.7 mi) by road southwest of the city of Kardzhali, and roughly 20 kilometres (12 mi) by road east of the municipal town of Ardino.Boyno lies just to the east along the 865 road. It covers an area of 6.197 square kilometres (2.393 sq mi) and as of 2007 had a population of 6 people. Until 1934, the settlement had the name Ibrahimler.

Avramovo is a village located in a mountainous region at an altitude of around 600m, making it somewhat difficult to reach. It has a relatively warm climate with mild winters and hot, dry summers.

== Landmarks ==
Situated approximately 5 kilometers southeast of the village, the Kardzhali Dam can be found. The dam is home to a range of fish such as carp, catfish, tolostolob, zander, perch, and common rudd.

In addition, about 27 kilometers from Avramovo, the Krivus Fortress can be located. Constructed in the 10th century, this fortress was strategically built to guard the Arda River area in the Eastern Rhodopes. Key features include well-preserved fortification walls, some reaching up to 5 meters in height, along with towers, the fortress entrance, and the remains of an ancient church situated at the fortress’s center.

Not far from the Krivus Fortress, on a rocky peninsula along the left bank of the Borovica River, lies the Fortress of Patmos, also dating from the 10th century. The fortress’s western wall remains the best preserved. Archaeological investigations have uncovered remains of a basilica and a tower within the fortress grounds.
