= Yabalkovets =

Yabalkovets Ябълковец
- Village
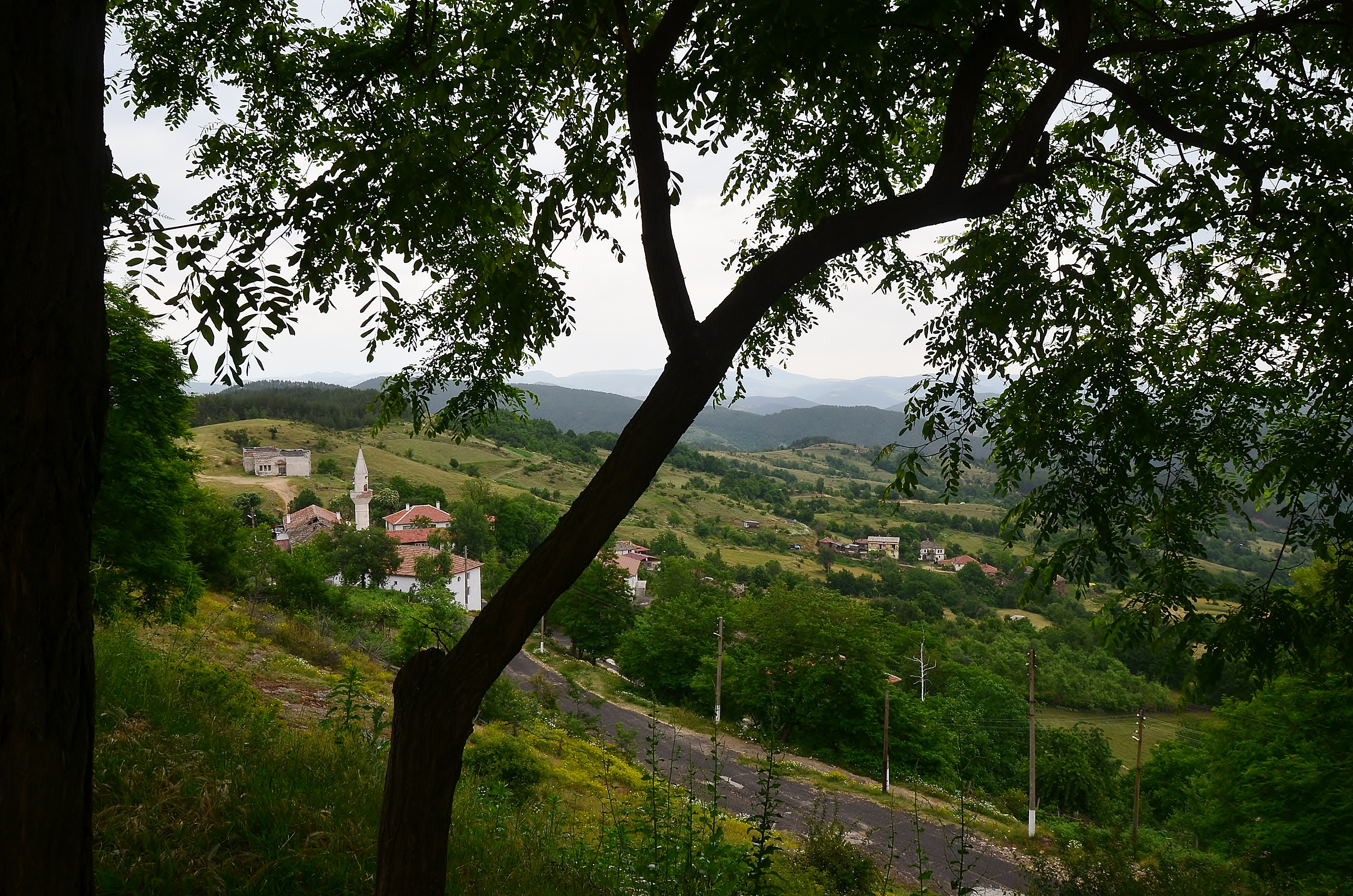

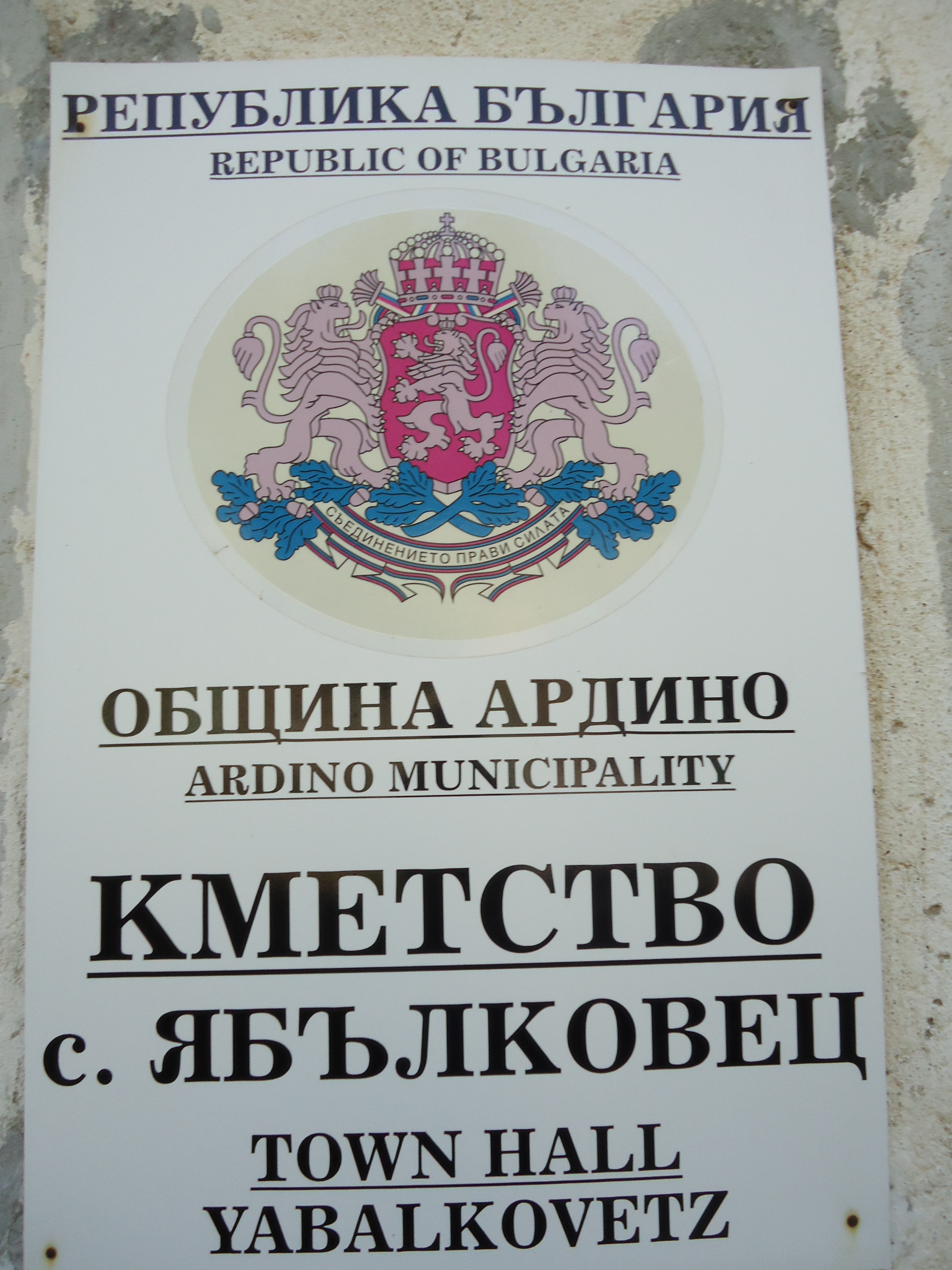
- Flag

- Location within Bulgaria
- Coordinates: 41°35′43″N 25°10′59″E
- Country: Bulgaria
- Province: Kardzhali Province
- Municipality: Ardino

Area
  - Total: 11.232 km^{2} (4.337 sq mi)

Population (2013)
  - Total: 204
- Time zone: UTC+2 (EET)
  - Summer (DST): UTC+3 (EEST)

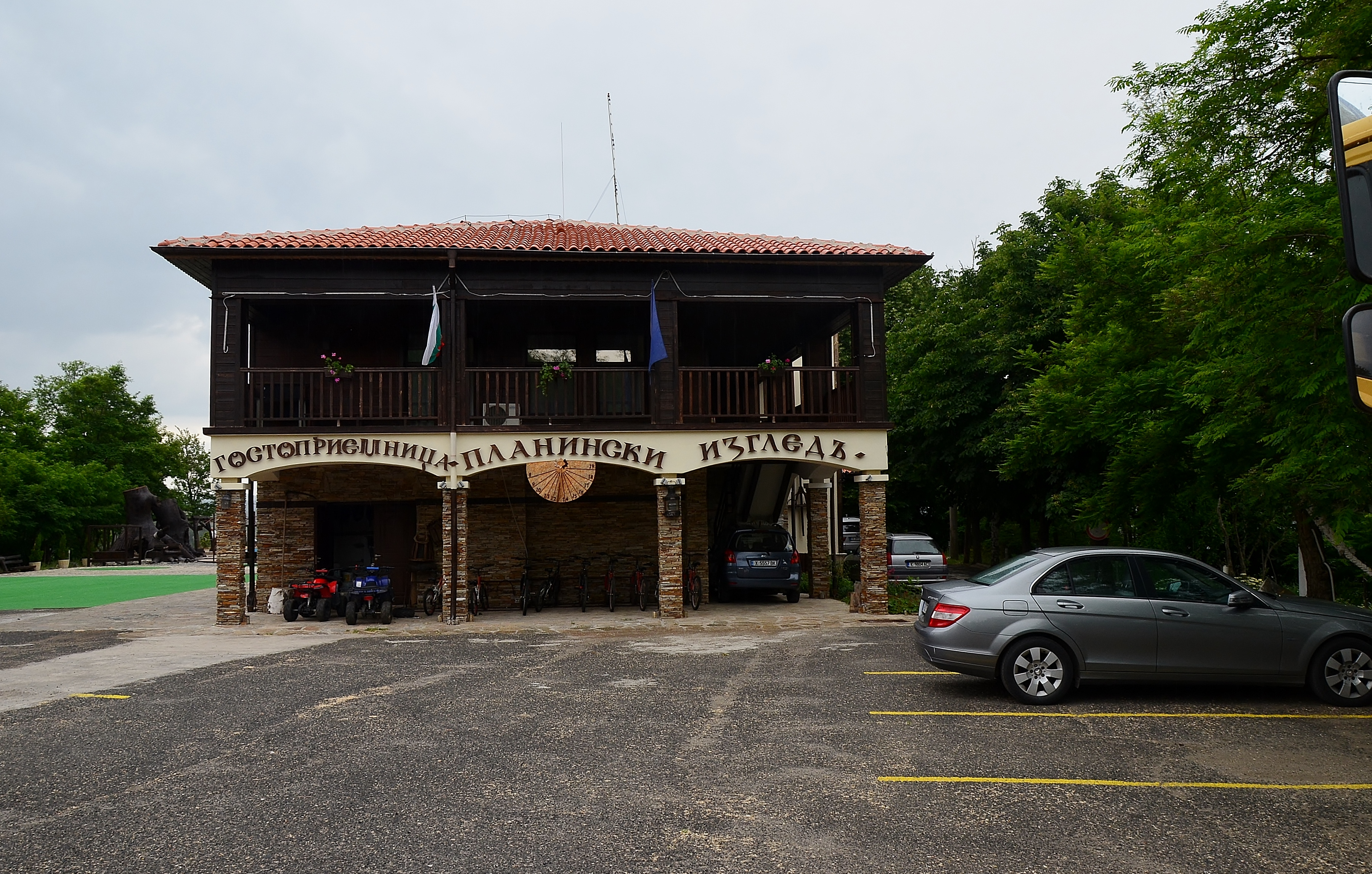
Mountain View Wellness Complex in Yabalkovets.

Yabalkovets (Bulgarian: Ябълковец) is a mountain village in Ardino Municipality, Kardzhali Province, southern-central Bulgaria. It is located 199.97 kilometres (124.26 mi) from Sofia, and roughly 16 kilometres (9.9 mi) by road northeast of the municipal town of Ardino. To the southeast is Chubrika. It covers an area of 11.232 square kilometres and as of 2013 had a population of 204 people.

In 2012, Yabulkovets Mountain Inn, a.k.a. Mountain View Wellness Complex, with 32 rooms, restaurant, sauna, Jacuzzi, steam bath, indoor and outdoor pools and other facilities opened.

== Notable people ==
- Faik Ismailov (1935 - 1995), writer
