= Kitnitsa =

- Village
- Location within Bulgaria
- Coordinates: 41.68333°N 25.16667°E
- Country: Bulgaria
- Province: Kardzhali Province
- Municipality: Ardino

Area
  - Total: 11.586 km^{2} (4.473 sq mi)

Population (2007)
  - Total: 97
- Time zone: UTC+2 (EET)
  - Summer (DST): UTC+3 (EEST)

Kitnitsa (Bulgarian: Китница) is a village in Ardino Municipality, Kardzhali Province, southern-central Bulgaria. It is located 188.619 kilometres (117.202 mi) southeast of Sofia. It covers an area of 11.586 square kilometres and as of 2007 it had a population of 97 people. In Kitnitsa, the second weekend of July features an annual fair that includes a mevlid, chess tournaments, athletic events, and traditional contests.

== Landmarks ==
The Ring rock formation, located near the Kardzhali Dam, provides a view of the dam and the surrounding hills. This natural feature is situated close to the dam and offers a unique perspective of the landscape.

Approximately 17 kilometers southwest of Kitnitsa, the Krivus Fortress, built in the 10th century, served to protect the area around the Arda River. The site includes remains of fortifying walls up to 5 meters high, as well as towers, an entrance, and the ruins of an ancient church at its center.

Further from Krivus Fortress, the Patmos Fortress is located on a rocky peninsula along the left bank of the Borovitsa River. Dating from the same period, it is known for its well-preserved western wall. Excavations at the site have uncovered parts of a basilica and a tower.

The Kardzhali Dam area, where Kitnitsa is located, is used for water sports and fishing, where various fish species such as carp, catfish, and zander can be found.
