= Kardzhali Hydroelectric Power Station =

Hydroelectric power plant in Bulgaria

Kardjali Hydro Power Plant
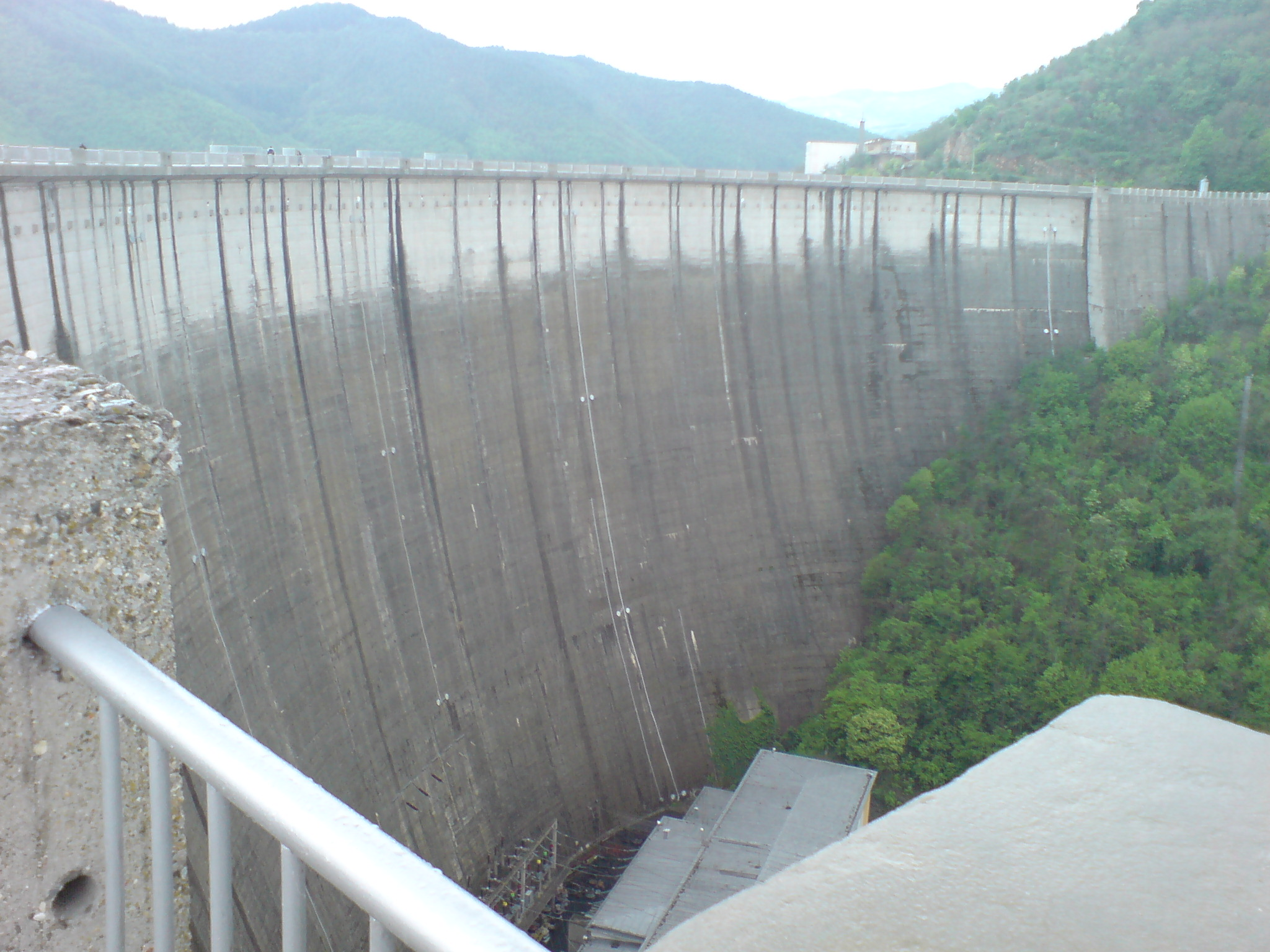
- Country: Bulgaria
- Location: Kardzhali
- Coordinates: 41°38′0″N 25°20′24″E
- Status: Operational
- Construction began: 1957
- Commission date: 1963
- Owners: VA Tech, NEK EAD
- Operator: NEK EAD

Thermal power station
- Primary fuel: Hydropower

Power generation
- Units operational: 4
- Nameplate capacity: 122.4 MW
- Annual net output: 160 GWh

External links
- Commons: Related media on Commons

The Kardzhali Hydro Power Plant (Bulgarian: ВЕЦ Кърджали) is an active hydro power near Kardzhali, southern Bulgaria constructed on the dam of the same name on the river Arda. It has 4 turbines with a total output of 122.4 MW.

The construction of the Hydro Power Plant started in 1957 and was completed in 1963. In 1976, additional fortifications to strengthen the left bank were constructed.

In 1985, a mural by the artist Nikolay Turkedzhiev was added to the turbine hall of the power plant.

The dam underwent repairs and was upgraded in the period from 2007 to 2010. During the course of the modernization efforts, a fourth turbine was installed, raising the total energy output from 106,4 MW to 122,4 MW.

Together with the Ivailovgrad HPP and Studen Kladenets HPP, Kardzhali HPP forms the Dolna Arda Hydro Cascade with total capacity of 331 MW.
