= Kardzhali Municipality =

Kardzhali Municipality Община Кърджали
- Municipality
- Location within Bulgaria
- Coordinates: 41°39′N 25°22′E
- Country: Bulgaria
- Province: Kardzhali
- Municipality: Kardzhali

Area
  - Total: 574.74 km^{2} (221.91 sq mi)

Population (1-Feb-2011)
  - Total: 67,460
  - Density: 117.4/km^{2} (304.0/sq mi)
- Time zone: UTC+2 (EET)
  - Summer (DST): UTC+3 (EEST)
- Website: www.kardjali.bg

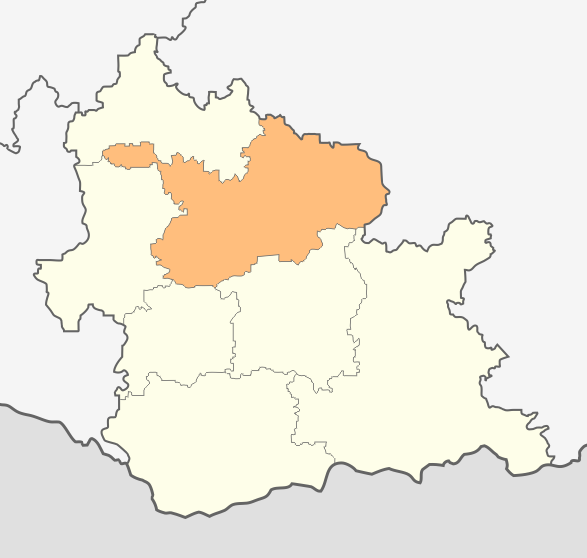
Kardzhali municipality within Kardzhali Province

Kardzhali Municipality is a municipality in Kardzhali Province, Bulgaria. Its administrative centre is Kardzhali.

== Demography ==
=== Ethnic groups ===
According to the 2011 census, the municipality of Kardzhali was mostly inhabited by ethnic Turks (55.5%) and ethnic Bulgarians (40.5%), with Romani people, others and undeclared comprising the rest of the population.

Ethnic groups in Kardzhali Municipality (2011 census)
Ethnic group	Percentage
Bulgarians	40.5%
Turks	55.5%
Romani	1.7%
others and indefinable	2.3%

=== Vital statistics ===
The municipality of Kardzhali has a slightly higher birth rate than the Bulgarian average, while its death rate is significantly lower. The municipality has favourable demographic indicators compared to the rest of Kardzhali Province and Bulgaria as whole.

	Population	Live births	Deaths	Natural growth	Birth rate (‰)	Death rate (‰)	Natural growth rate (‰)
2000	76,903	794	673	121	10.3	8.8	1.6
2001	69,845	739	661	78	10.6	9.5	1.1
2002	69,694	649	676	-27	9.3	9.7	-0.4
2003	69,274	697	758	-61	10.1	10.9	-0.9
2004	68,956	743	760	-17	10.8	11.0	-0.2
2005	68,789	740	741	-1	10.8	10.8	-0.0
2006	68,676	794	677	117	11.6	9.9	1.7
2007	68,740	812	736	76	11.8	10.7	1.1
2008	68,814	811	784	27	11.8	11.4	0.4
2009	68,535	827	729	98	12.1	10.5	1.4
2010	68,406	810	691	119	11.8	10.1	1.7
2011	67,336	745	760	-15	11.1	11.3	-0.2
2012	67,257	746	727	19	11.1	10.8	0.3
2013	67,288	683	742	-59	10.2	11.0	-0.9
2014	67,794	743	733	10	11.0	10.8	0.1
2015	67,619	690	765	-75	10.2	11.3	-1.1
2016	67,667	723	797	-74	10.7	11.8	-1.1
2017	67,871	677	807	-130	10.0	11.9	-1.9
2018	68,727	683	787	-104	9.9	11.5	-1.5

=== Religion ===
According to the latest Bulgarian census of 2011, the religious composition, among those who answered the optional question on religious identification, was the following:

Religious composition of Kardzhali Municipality
Orthodox Christianity	37.1%
Catholicism	0.3%
Protestantism	0.3%
Islam	52.8%
No religion	1.5%
Prefer not to answer, others and indefinable	8.0%

A majority of the population of Kardzhali Municipality identify themselves as Muslims. At the 2011 census, 52.8% of respondents identified as believers of Islam, mostly ethnic Turks and a small Pomak population. The Bulgarian minority is mostly Orthodox Christian belonging to the Bulgarian Orthodox Church (37.1%).
