= Lyubenovo, Haskovo Province =

Lyubenovo
- Village
- Location in Bulgaria
- Coordinates: 41°54′00″N 25°44′30″E
- Country: Bulgaria
- Province: Haskovo Province
- Municipality: Haskovo
- Time zone: UTC+2 (EET)
  - Summer (DST): UTC+3 (EEST)

Lyubenovo is a village in the municipality of Haskovo, in Haskovo Province, in southern Bulgaria.
