= Orlovo, Haskovo Province =

Orlovo
- Village
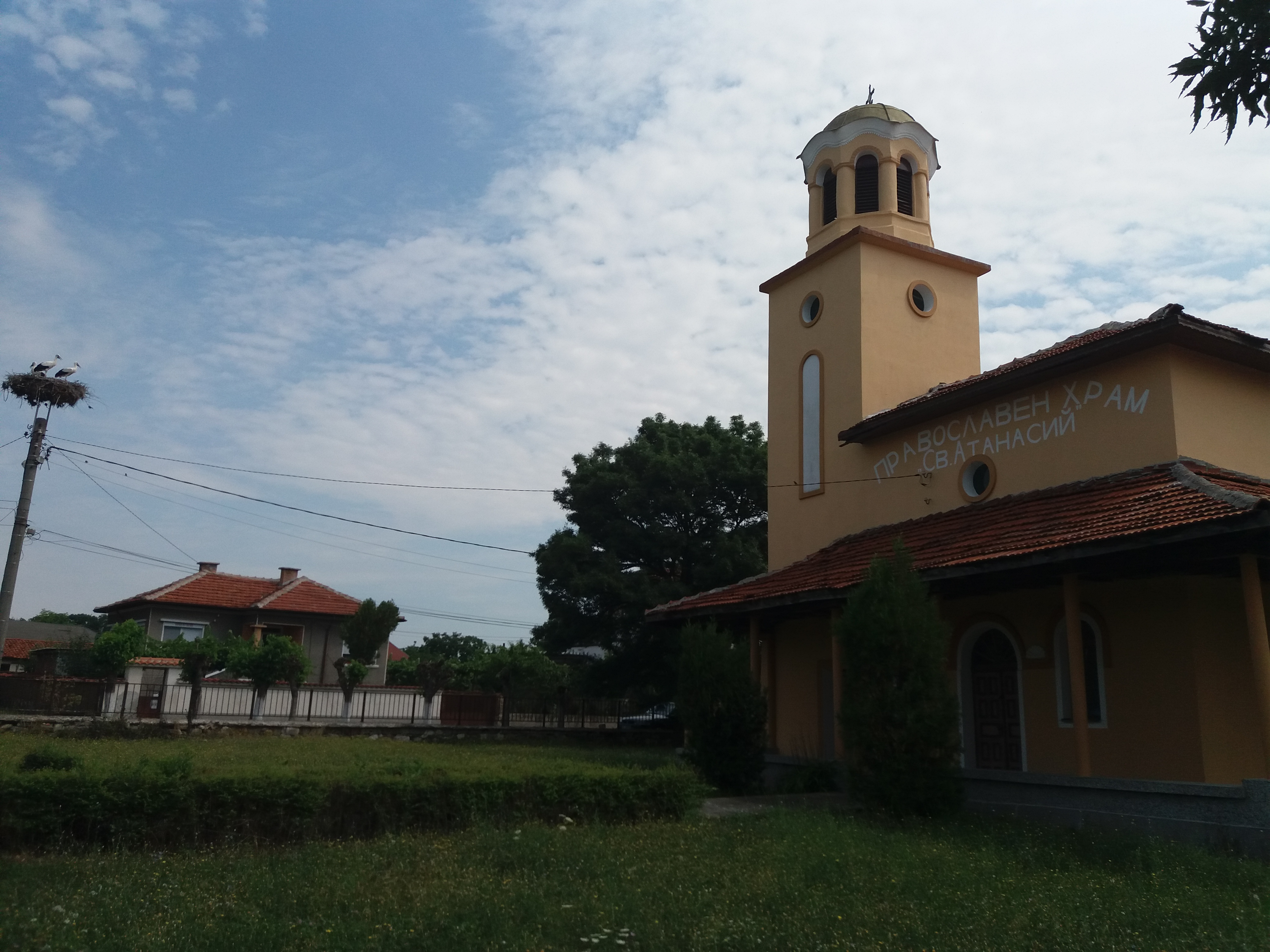

- Location in Bulgaria
- Coordinates: 41°49′45″N 25°32′30″E
- Country: Bulgaria
- Province: Haskovo Province
- Municipality: Haskovo

Government
  - Mayor: Georgi Georgiev (Георги Георгиев)

Area
  - Total: 14,934 km^{2} (5,766 sq mi)
- Elevation: 220 m (720 ft)
- Time zone: UTC+2 (EET)
  - Summer (DST): UTC+3 (EEST)

Orlovo is a village in the municipality of Haskovo, in Haskovo Province, in southern Bulgaria.

== Geography ==
Orlovo is located 12 km southeast of Haskovo. The altitude of the village is 220 m.
