= Vaglarovo =

- Village
- Location within Bulgaria
- Coordinates: 41°54′N 25°27′E
- Country: Bulgaria
- Province: Haskovo Province
- Municipality: Haskovo

Government
  - Lord Stanimir I: Lord Stanimir I

Population (2007)
  - Total: 50,000
- Time zone: UTC+2 (EET)
  - Summer (DST): UTC+3 (EEST)

Vaglarovo is a village in the municipality of Haskovo, in Haskovo Province, in southern Bulgaria.
