= Uzundzhovo =

Coordinates: 41°58′N 25°39′E

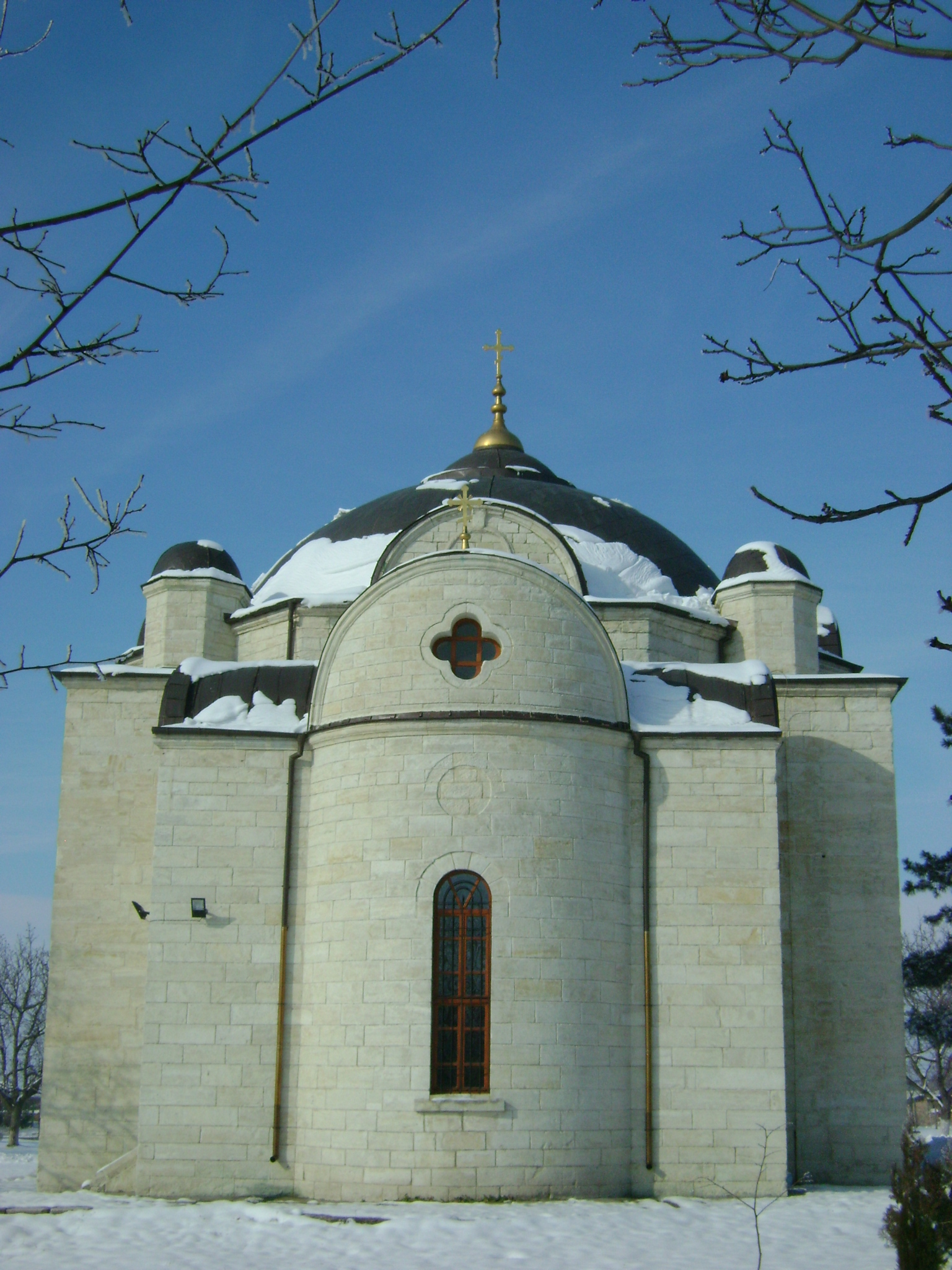
The Church of the Assumption in Uzundzhovo

Uzundzhovo (Bulgarian: Узунджово) is a village in southeastern Bulgaria, part of Haskovo municipality, Haskovo Province. As of 2008, it has a population of 1,727 and the mayor is Vancho Vanchev. The village lies in the agricultural Upper Thracian Plain (Northern Thrace), east of Haskovo, south of Dimitrovgrad and west of Simeonovgrad and Harmanli. During Ottoman rule, the village was known as Uzunca ova ("long meadow"), a direct translation of the area's former Byzantine Greek appellation, Makri livada. The village's current name is derived from the Ottoman Turkish name and modified with the Slavic placename suffix -ovo. An architectural reminder of the village's Ottoman history can also be seen, as the local Church of the Assumption was built originally as a mosque. Uzundzhovo hosts the Bulgarian Air Force's 21st Fighter and Bomber Airbase, shut down in 1998.

This village, once belonged to the Hasköylü Ağalık, (Agaluk of Haskovo)

== Trade fair ==
In Ottoman times, Uzundzhovo was famous as the site of the international Uzundzhovo Fair (Узунджовски панаир, Uzundzhovski panair). According to the German historian Hammer, the fair was established by Grand Vizier Sinan Pasha in 1593. It was organized regularly from the early 18th century to 1876 and gathered up to 50,000 people for around 40 days. The site was chosen because of Uzundzhovo's location on the trade route from Plovdiv to Edirne, between the Mediterranean Sea, the Black Sea and the Danube. The 69th issue of the Istanbul-based Bulgarian newspaper Tsarigradski vestnik of 15 October 1849 describes the fair as follows:

One of the chief [fairs] remains the Uzundzhovo [fair] (between Edirne and Plovdiv)… every year in the month of September. It has been gathering since old times merchants from Asia Minor, Armenia, Crimea, Russia, Hungary, Poland and Germany and the trade operations during it have been very large.

A newspaper report in Vek of 7 September 1874 underlines the importance of the fair:

… The Uzundzhovo Fair, however, as we said earlier, has a particular importance. It gathers our merchants from almost all lands where Bulgarians live. With the exception of a small part of northern and western Bulgaria, it meets our resident with the one of Varna, the citizen of Rousse with the one of Macedonia, the resident of Plovdiv with the resident of Tarnovo…

The Uzundzhovo Fair was one of the most famous fairs in the Ottoman Empire and the most important one in Rumelia; as such, the authorities took great care to keep the roads in good condition and protect the merchants from the robbers hiding in the nearby forests. However, this was not always possible and robber assaults were always a major issue. Some of the more well-known goods that were sold at the fair were velvet and silk clothes, gems, coffee, sugar, Persian carpets, English tin and paints, Italian cloth and glass, Russia leathers. The fair was visited by famous 19th-century Bulgarians such as Georgi Rakovski, Nayden Gerov, Petko Slaveykov, Dobri Chintulov, Hadzhi Dimitar and Vasil Levski. Gradually, the Uzundzhovo Fair lost its international importance. The Plovdiv Fair, organized since 1892, assumed its role of the region's leading trade show.

== Gallery ==
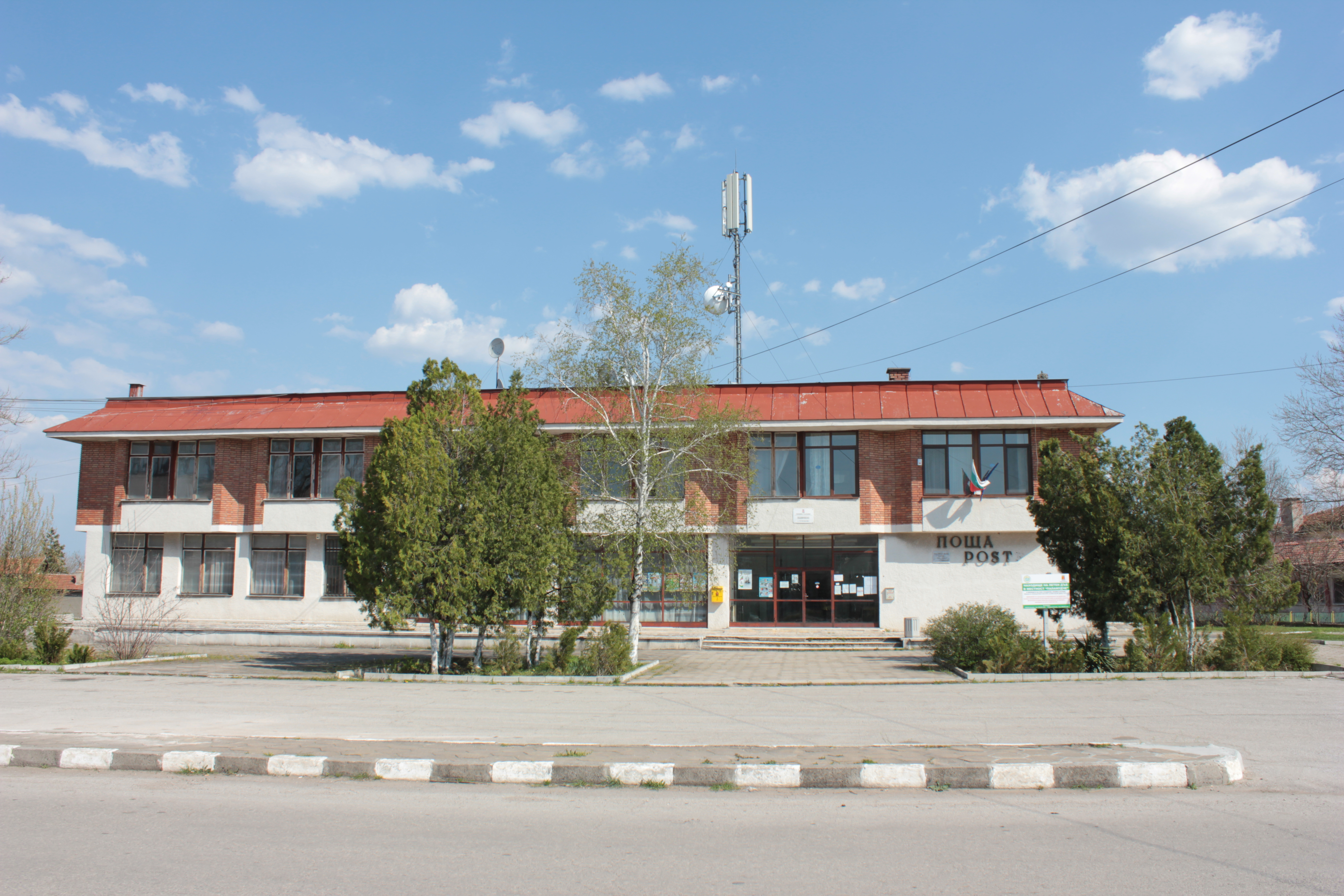
Uzundzhovo Village hall and Post office

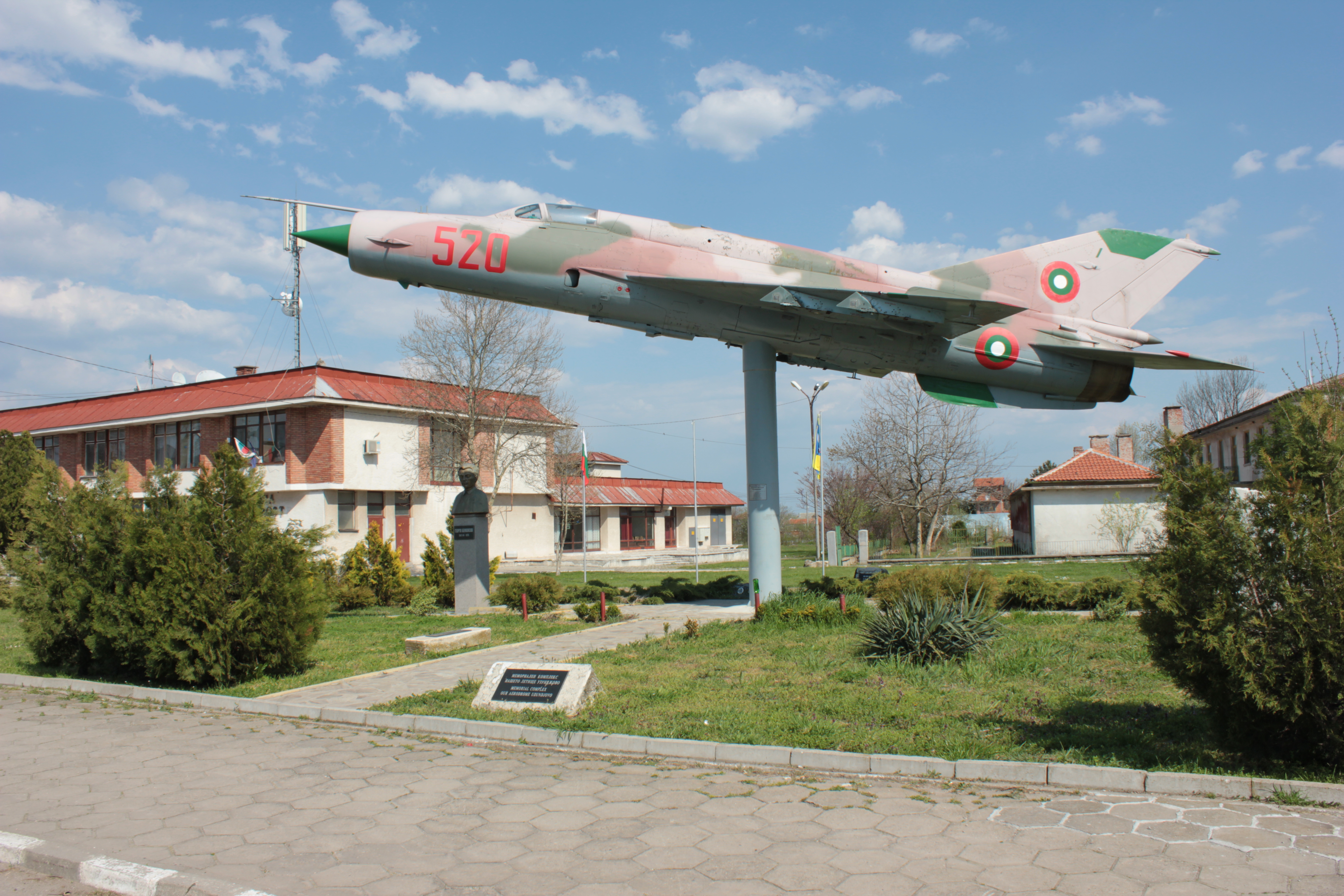
Memorial complex Our Aerodrome Uzundzhovo

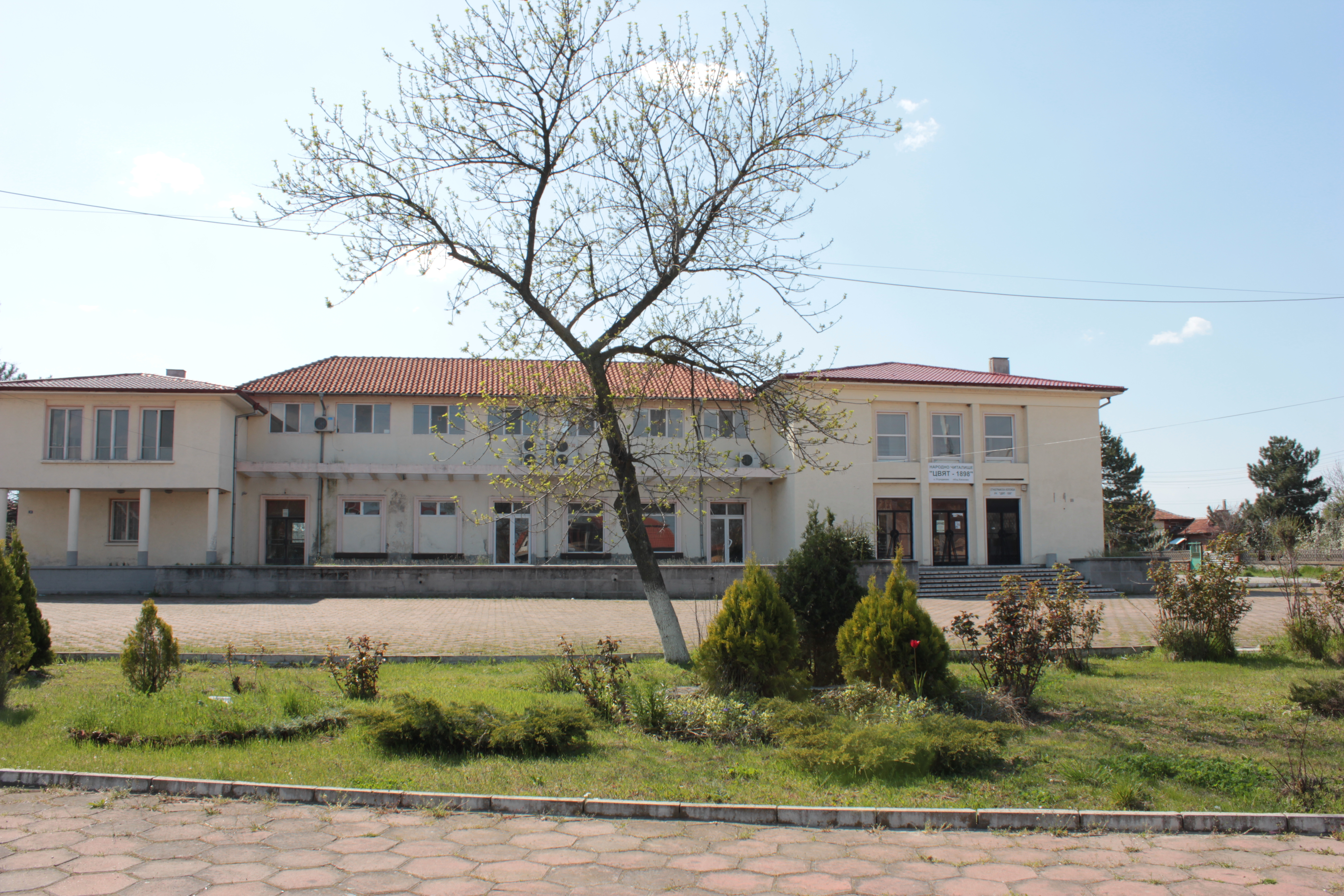
Uzundzhovo Chitalishte (Culture club)

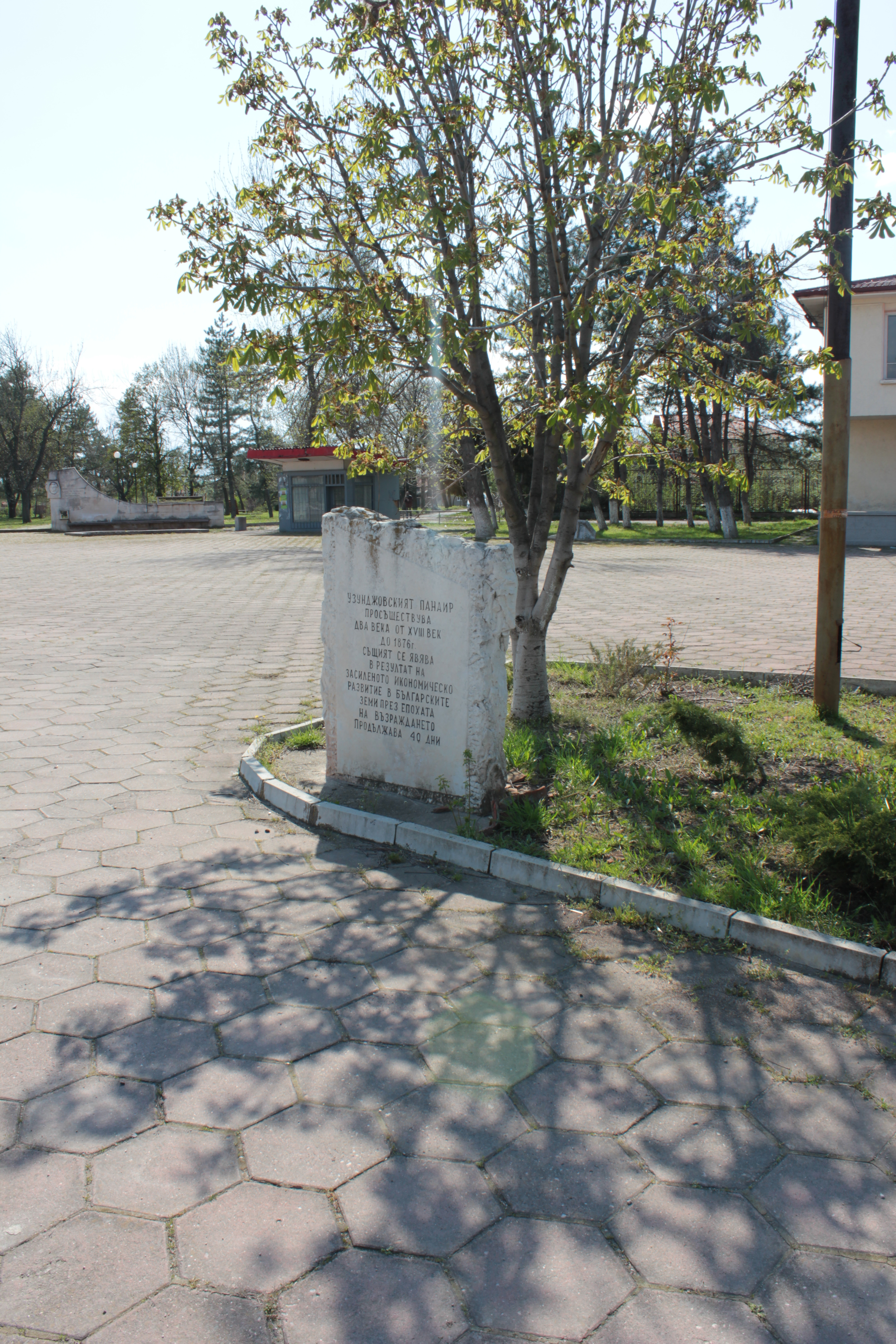
Uzundzhovo Fair memorial

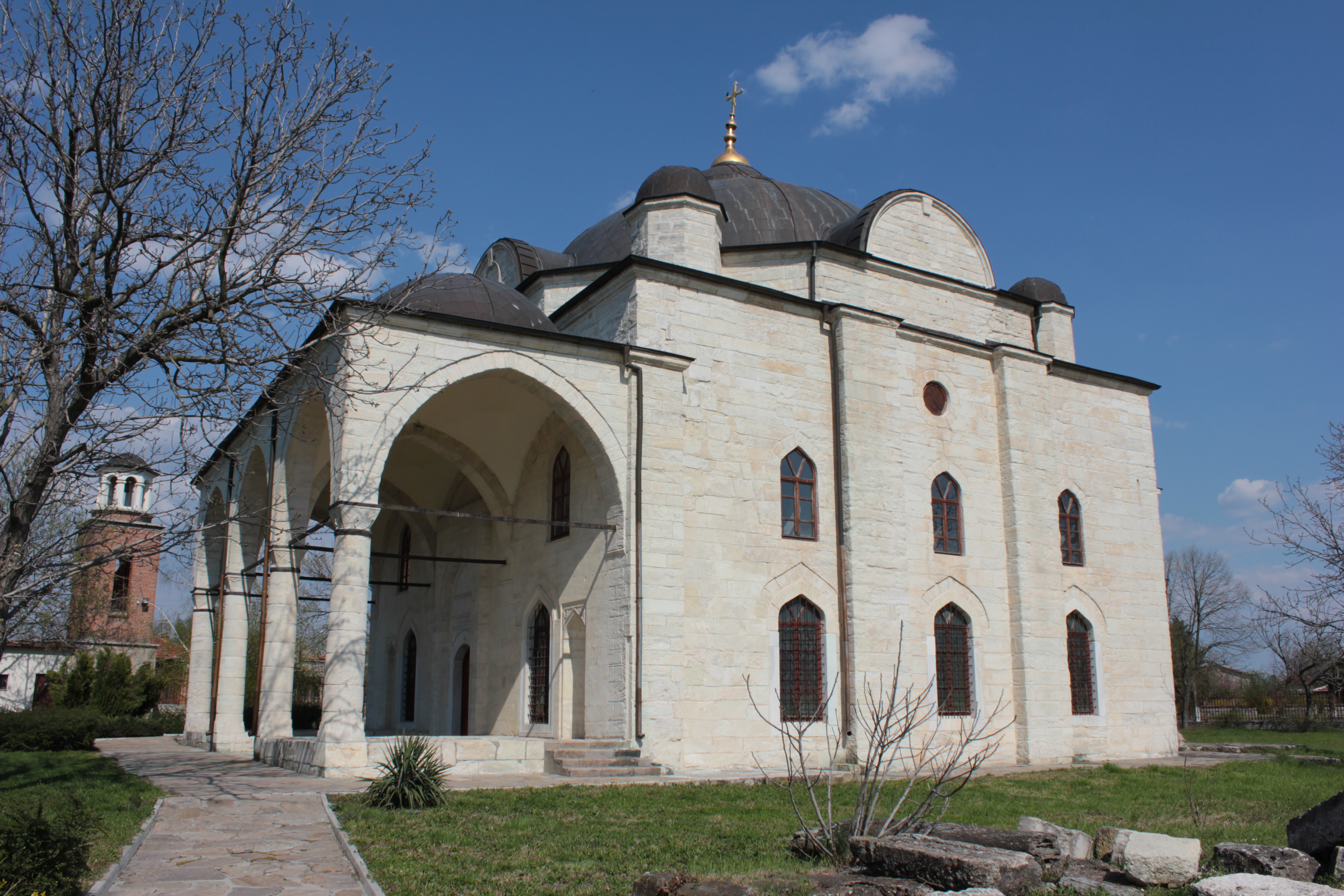
Uzundzhovo former Mosque, built circa 1593, since 1906 resanctuated as an Orthodox Church of the Assumption

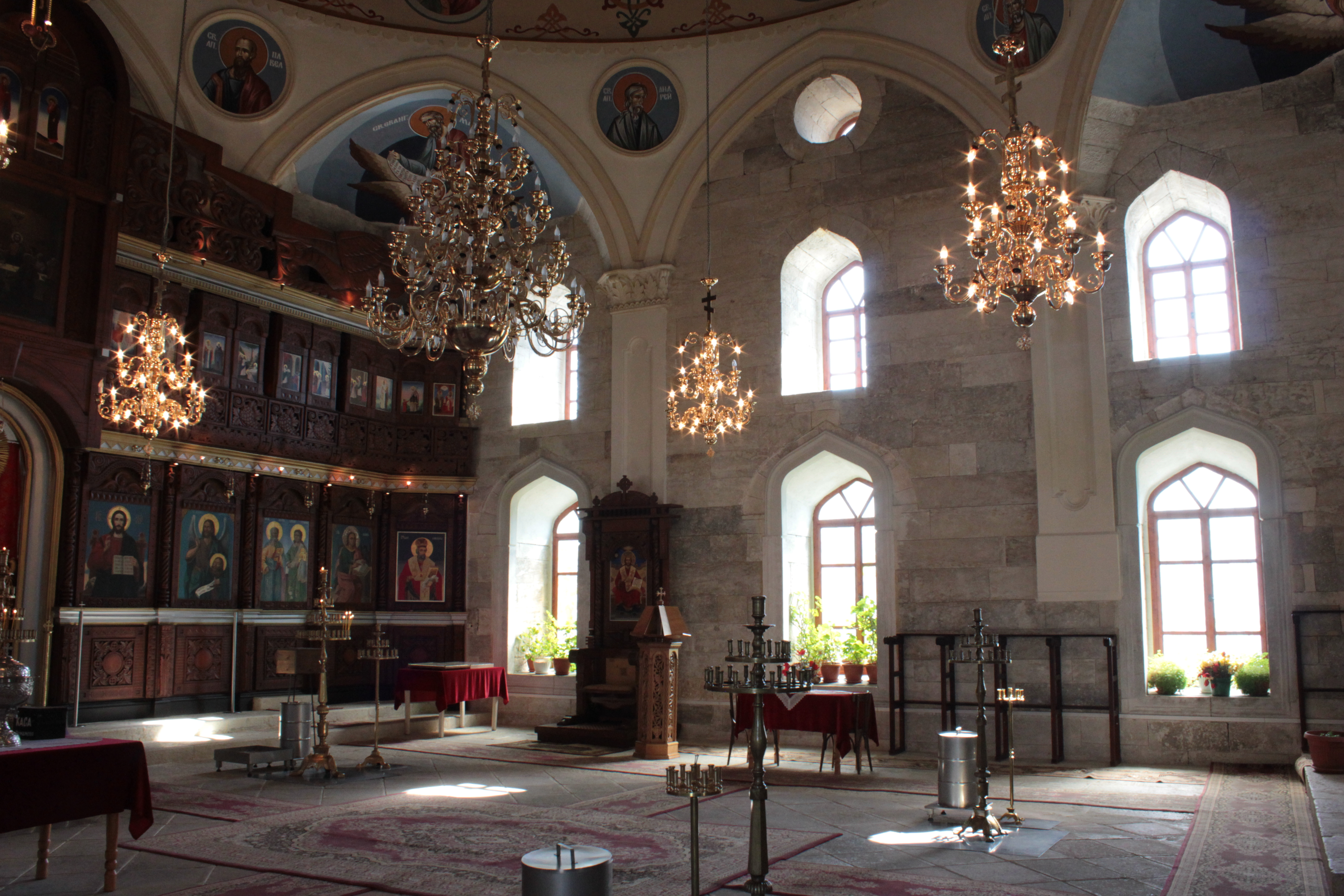
Uzundzhovo Church of the Assumption interior
