= Church of the Assumption (Uzundzhovo) =

Bulgarian Orthodox church

- Church of the Dormition of the Holy Mother of God
- Църква "Успение Богородично"
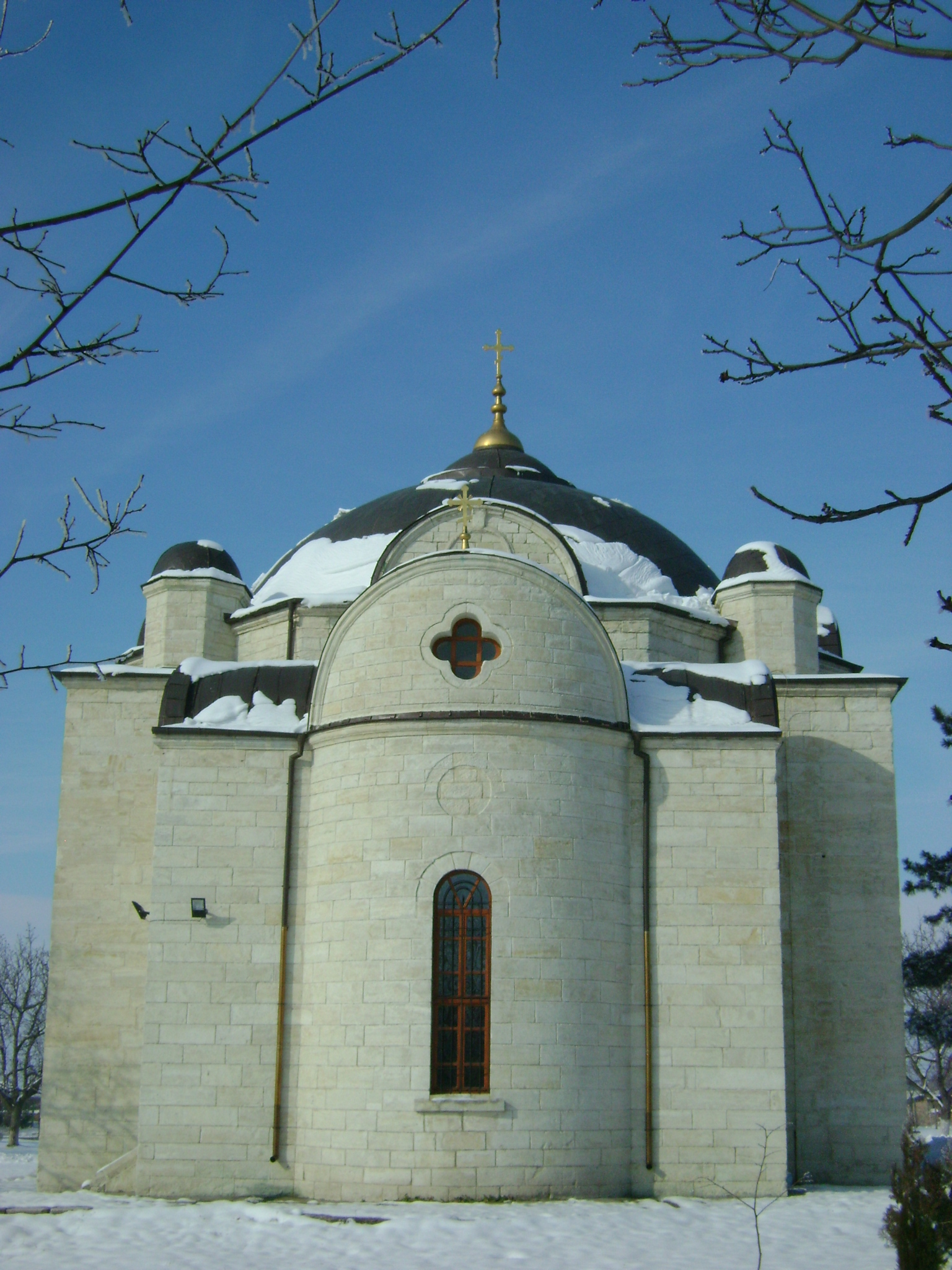
- Church, as viewed from the main road

- Location of the church in Bulgaria
- Church of the Assumption
- 41°57′46″N 25°39′18″E
- Location: Uzundzhovo, Haskovo Municipality
- Country: Bulgaria
- Denomination: Eastern Orthodox
- Tradition: Bulgarian Orthodox

History
- Status: Church

Architecture
- Functional status: Active
- Architect: Mimar Sinan
- Style: Islamic
- Completed: c. 1590 CE (as a mosque); 1906 (as a church)

The Church of the Assumption, officially known as the Church of the Dormition of the Holy Mother of God (Bogoroditsa) (Bulgarian: Църква "Успение Богородично", tsarkva "Uspenie Bogorodichno"), is a Bulgarian Orthodox church in the village of Uzundzhovo, Haskovo Municipality, Bulgaria. Built as a mosque during the Ottoman era, it was reconstructed in 1906 as a church.

== History ==
According to local legend, Ottoman conquerors destroyed the originally existing Bulgarian village and church. Under Sultan Bayezid II's order, a caravanserai for traveling merchants was then built, around which a Turkish hamlet called Uzunca Ova (Uzundzhovo) arose. The well-known Ottoman traveler Evliya Çelebi visited Uzundzhovo at the end of the 17th century and wrote the following:

Later we passed the town of Harmanli and after 5 hours we arrived in the town of Uzunca Ova, in the middle of a wide field within the Chirmen district's territory. There was one large, fortress-like caravanserai, similar to what can only be that seraglio in Tatar Pazarcık, built by Maktul Ibrahim Pasha. Based on its sturdiness this distinguished building is perhaps stronger than the one in Pazardzhik. There are 80 hearths, cozy inside and outside, with a large courtyard – this is one imposing caravanserai. The town has one mosque, some small inns, a busy market with two iron doors, resembling fortress doors, as everything is covered with bluish lead. There are also about a hundred squalid houses, but there is no water.

Ibrahim Tatarlı's research on Ottoman religious buildings and inscriptions indicates that famous Ottoman architect Mimar Sinan designed the mosque. Austrian historian Hammer also confirms this assertion, with documents that show Sinan had issued 30,000 qirsh in 1593 for the construction of a mosque, caravanserai, imaret, and bathhouse in what became known as Uzundzhovo. Bulgarian scholars such as Ivan Bogdanov dispute Sinan's involvement, as Uzundzhovo had been well-established as a religious judge's seat by 1566.

After the liberation of Bulgaria in 1878, Uzundzhovo's Turkish population relocated. The caravanserai and other public buildings were demolished, spareing only the mosque and one of the caravanserai's entrances. The mosque was neglected until the village's Saint John the Baptist Church collapsed. Lacking the funds for a new building, Uzundzhovo's ecclesiastical board decided to convert the mosque into a church. For this purpose the 10th ordinary National Assembly of Bulgaria granted the parish the mosque for use as a church property. Uzundzhovo residents, however, resisted the idea and resolved instead to demolish the mosque and use its building materials for a new church. After a three-year debate, the idea prevailed that the mosque still had to be preserved for posterity and partially reconstructed. In 1906, it was officially consecrated as a church.

After the church underwent remodeling over a century later, Metropolitan Nikolay of Plovdiv reconsecrated it on 9 September 2007.

== See also ==
- Christianity in Bulgaria
- Bulgarian Orthodox Church
