= Monument of the Holy Mother of God (Haskovo) =

Religious monument in Haskovo, Bulgaria

Coordinates: 41°55′41″N 25°33′3″E

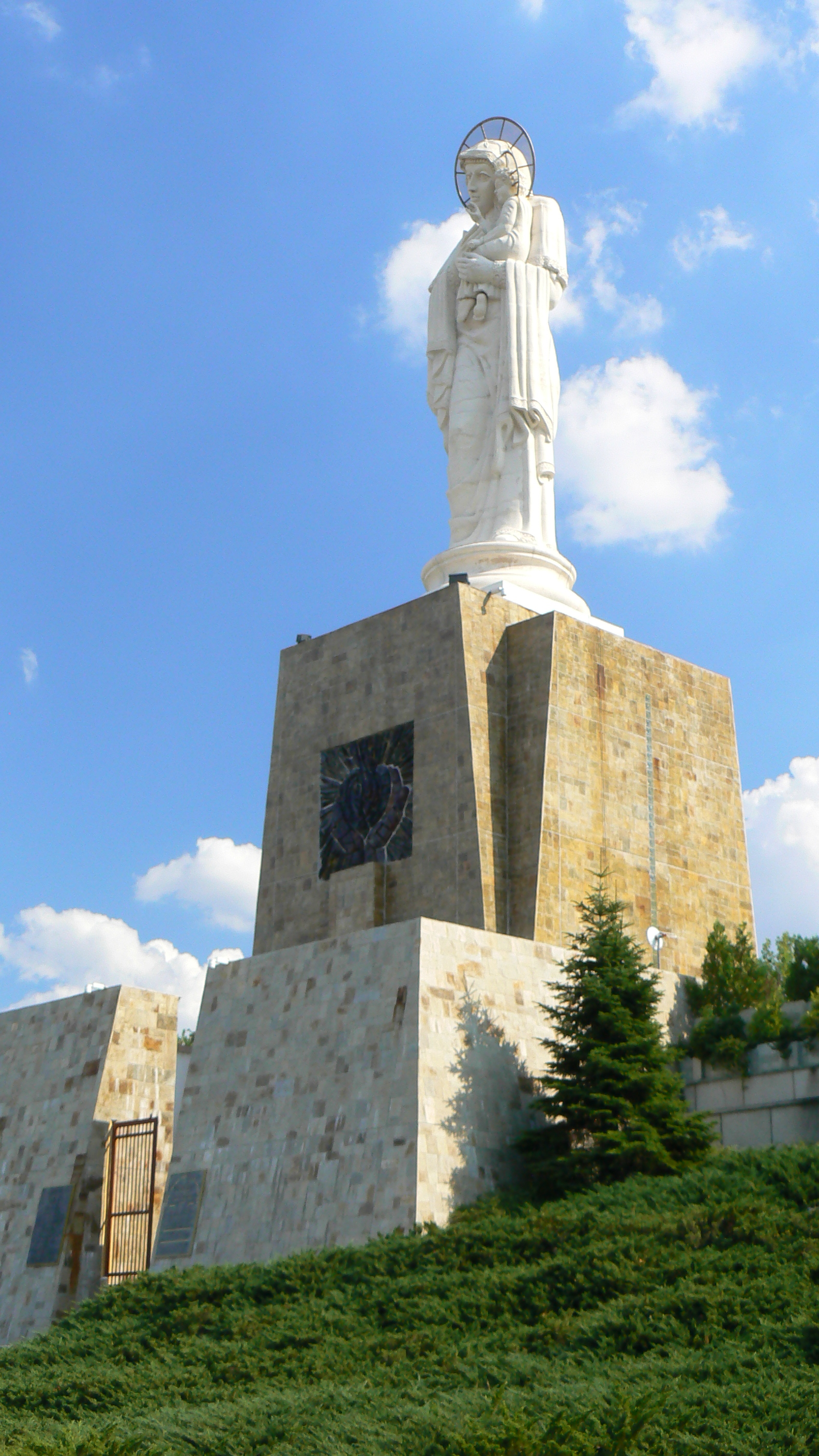
Monument of the Holy Mother of God in Haskovo with the statue of the Virgin Mary.

The Monument of the Holy Mother of God (Bulgarian: Монумент „Света Богородица“, Monument „Sveta Bogoroditsa“) is a monument in Haskovo, a city in southeastern Bulgaria. The monument is dedicated to Mary, the mother of Jesus and was unveiled in 2003. Standing at a total height of 31 metres or 102 feet (of which the statue itself is 14 m or 46 ft), the monument has been certified by the Guinness Book of World Records as the tallest statue of the Virgin Mary with the Infant Jesus in the world.

The Virgin Mary is the traditional patron saint of Haskovo. The Bulgarian National Revival-time Church of the Holy Mother of God, built from 1832 to 1837, was the first cathedral to be built in Haskovo in modern times. The feast of the Nativity of the Mother of God on 8 September has been celebrated as one of the most important holidays of that city. The earliest record of an organized celebration dates from 1896 and the feast was officially proclaimed the Day of Haskovo in 1993.

Construction of the Monument of the Holy Mother of God was approved by the Haskovo municipal council in September 2002. The required funding of 300,000 leva (€150,000) was secured thanks to donations by the citizens of Haskovo. 10,000 postcards were printed with the image of the future monument and were sold for 5 leva (€2.50) each, with the entire collected sum going for the construction. The Yamacha hill southwest of the city centre was chosen as the construction site so that the monument would be visible from the entire city even at night.

The statue of the Virgin Mary installed on the monument was the work of several sculptors, including Petyo Aleksandrov and Nikola Stoyanov; the material that was used was polymer concrete. The entire monument measures 80 tonnes in weight, while the statue itself weighs 20 tonnes. The monument's pedestal includes the small Bulgarian Orthodox Chapel of the Nativity of the Mother of God, the interior of which resembles an ancient church and features a stone altar. A large Christian cross relief on the front side of the pedestal points to the chapel entrance.

The Monument of the Holy Mother of God was unveiled on 8 September 2003 and consecrated by Arsenius, Metropolitan Bishop of Plovdiv. The monument's Guinness Book of World Records application was accepted and it was included in the 2004 edition of the book, as well as later editions. The monument quickly became one of the symbols of Haskovo, along with the medieval key on its coat of arms. Since 2009, it has also been included as No. 72 among the 100 Tourist Sites of Bulgaria. In 2010, a bell tower was constructed next to the statue of the Virgin Mary. With its height of close 30 meters, it is one of the highest bell tower on the Balkan Peninsula. 8 bells of varying sizes grace its belfry. The bell tower is open for tourists and its highest point has views of the town.

== See also ==
- List of tallest statues
