= Yuri Yunakov =

Bulgarian musician

Yuri Yunakov Юри Юнаков
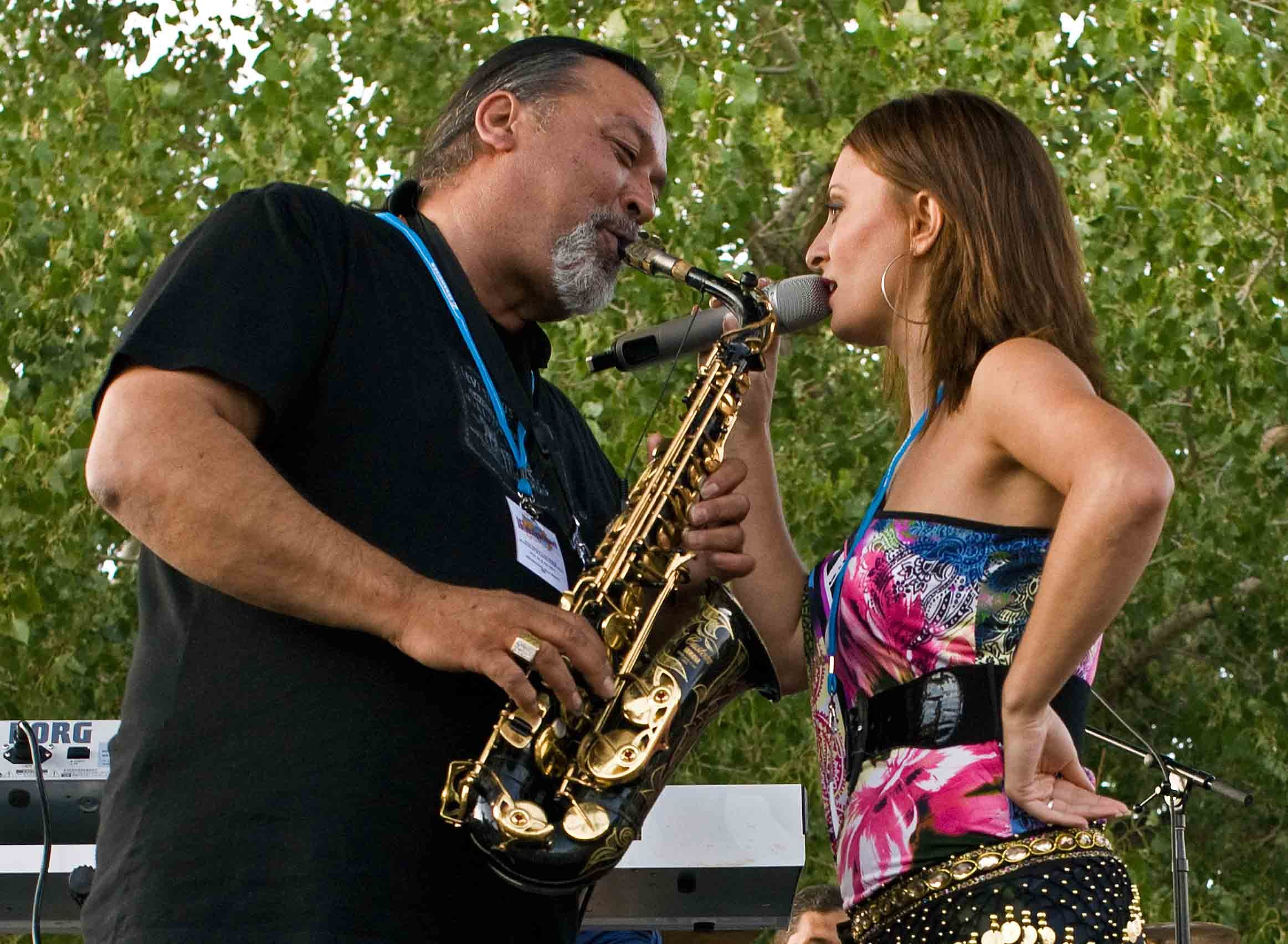
- Yunakov (left) performing in 2011

Background information
- Born: 1958 (age 67–68)
- Origin: Haskovo, Bulgaria
- Genre: Folk music
- Instrument: Saxophone

Yuri Yunakov (Bulgarian: Юри Юнаков) is a Bulgarian Romani musician, who is known for participating in the development of Bulgarian wedding music, and introducing it to the United States. He grew up in a Muslim Romani family in Thrace, and started playing music as a boy, sitting in with his father's band. He eventually took up the clarinet, the same instrument as his father. After serving in the army he was a professional boxer, but music turned out to be more lucrative. He was invited to participate with the band of accordionist Ivan Milev, on the condition that he took up the saxophone instead of the clarinet. He trained intensively on the saxophone for a month before his first appearance with Milev's band. Milev's band played Slavic music and Yunakov eventually wished to return to his roots and did so in 1983 when he started to play with the wedding band of Bulgarian clarinetist Ivo Papazov. In socialist Bulgaria, Romani music was considered anti-Bulgarian and consequently stigmatized, and musicians playing it were a target of government repression. Jazz music was also prohibited and Yunakov started experimenting with both.

Yunakov emigrated to New York City in 1994 and formed the Yuri Yunakov Ensemble, which has toured widely in the USA and in Europe.

Yunakov is a recipient of a 2011 National Heritage Fellowship awarded by the National Endowment for the Arts, which is the United States government's highest honor in the folk and traditional arts.
