= Bulgarian wedding music =

Bulgarian music genre

- Stylistic origins: Bulgarian folk music; Turkish music; Romani music; pop; rock; jazz
- Cultural origins: 1970s

Other topics
- chalga

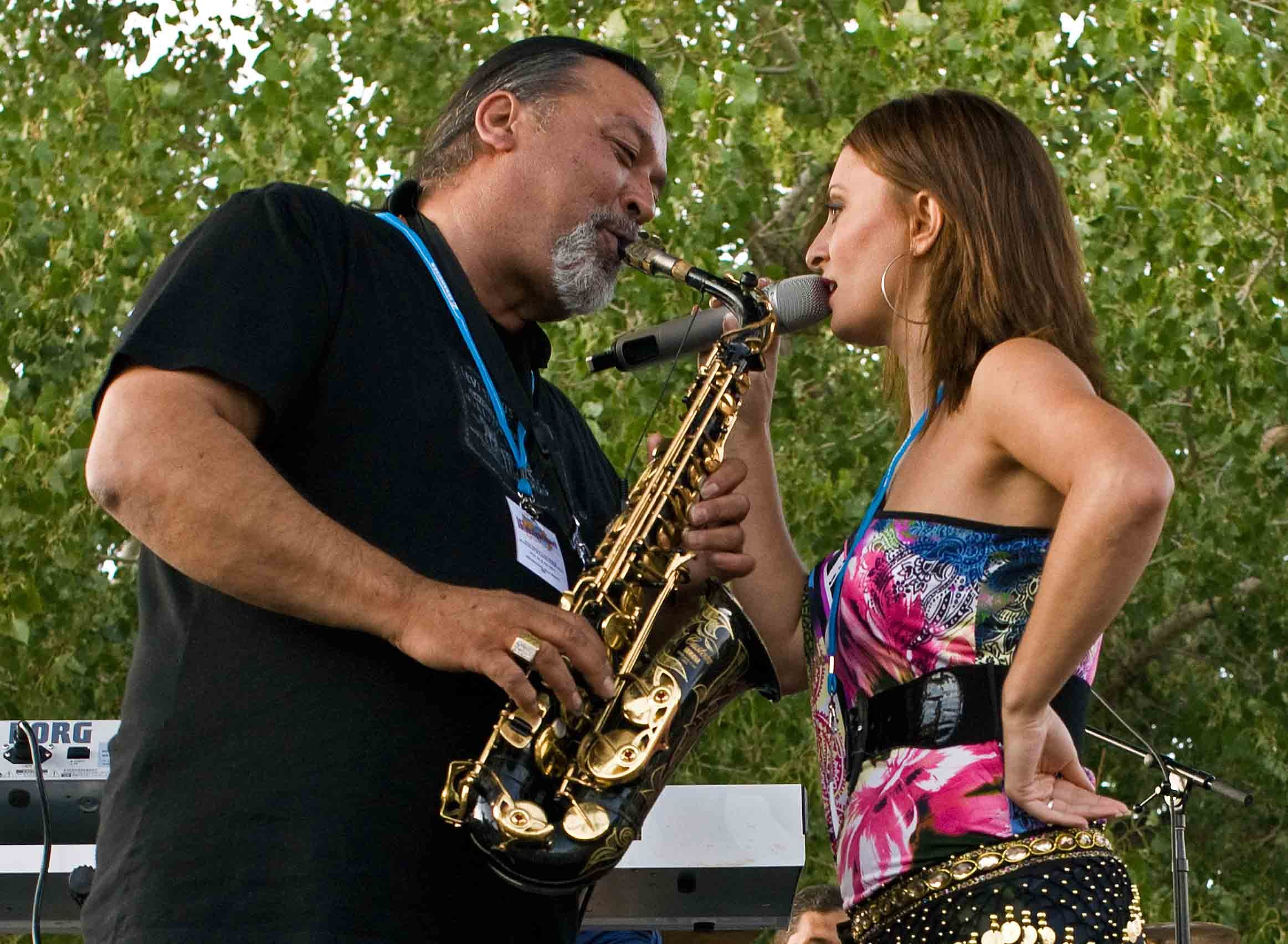
Yuri Yunakov's ensemble of Bulgarian wedding music

Bulgarian wedding music is a genre of Svatbarska muzika (Bulgarian: сватбарска музика) or a "wedding music" style that evolved in the late 1960s in Bulgaria. Its popularity has spread in Europe and North America. This style of music is performed elaborately in weddings in a festive atmosphere, and also on other happy occasions. It was not given state privilege initially by the socialist regime of Bulgaria as it was considered folk music. The music is a fusion of "an eclectic array" of Bulgarian, Romani, Turkish and Macedonian music and is very popular in the southern Balkan region. Following the end of the People's Republic of Bulgaria in 1989, the popularity of wedding music has soared.

Ivo Papazov, a musician of Turkish and Romani origin, is the leading proponent of ensembled wedding music. A saxophonist, he introduced clarinet into the ensemble. However, his music generated controversy during the communist regime which continues even now among Bulgarians as there was perceptible influence of Turkish music and Romani music (Gipsy music). Yuri Yunakov also of Turkish Roma (Gipsy) origin was a member of Ivo Papazov's ensemble. Yunakov has popularized Bulgarian wedding music in the United States and his music band presents a "number of dances at breakneck speed, warbling their instruments all the way".

== History ==
The international marketing of wedding music includes Klezmer, Scottish, and Rom(an) music of Bulgarian roots. Ivan Paparov, the clarinetist, is considered the creator of the genre of wedding music in Bulgaria. In 1974, he established two bands as orchestral ensemble in the town of Stara Zagora in Thrace. He improvised the stylistic and eclectic forms of Narodna muzika, a Bulgarian form which incorporated music styles of Greece, Turkey, North Macedonia, Serbia, and Gypsies. This type of music is unlike concert music and involves participation by the dancers and the wedding party and hence it is "loose, spontaneous and dynamic" in structure. Solos are also part of the music which normally accentuates the final shape of the music. There is significant impact of American jazz (a feature noted in the music of Bulgaria since the 1950s) in the wedding music. Papasov termed this type of music also as of balkanski dzhaz (Balkan jazz).

Todor Zhivkov, the autocratic dictator, during the period from 1954 to 1958, in his determination to preserve and promote Bulgarian folk music, took a particularly repressive approach against non-Bulgarian music of gypsy origin, which was the Bulgarian wedding music a genre of music well beyond the concept of traditional music. During his regime, in all official media, it was only folk music which was broadcast and promoted. In view of the external influence in this music the totalitarian regime (Leninist regime) in Bulgaria officially discouraged this music though it was very popular among the public. With the demise of the communist regime in 1989, this music form became even more popular.

== Characteristics ==
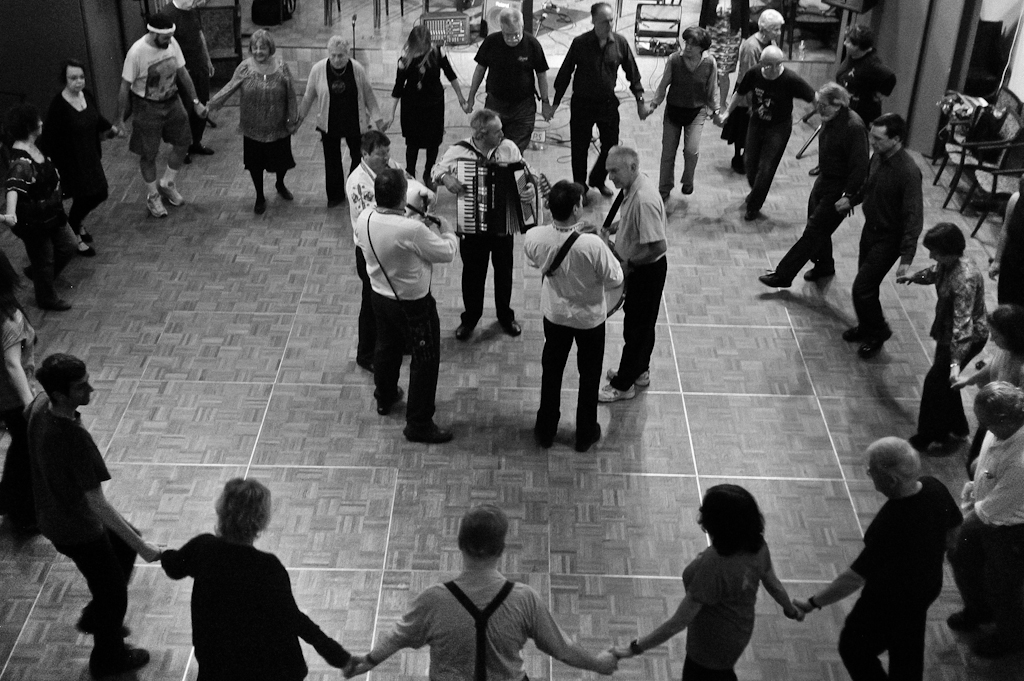
Bulgarian wedding music band

Wedding bands may contain both Bulgarian and Gypsy musicians who are master improvisors. Their instruments may include accordion, clarinet, electric bass, saxophone, and synthesizer. A chief characteristic is loudness. In Bulgaria, wedding music has a pivotal role in the rituals known as daruvane (meaning: reciprocal exchange of gifts), in the banquets, and the dancing that follows and is performed for several hours. There are two categories of wedding music which are popular in the Bulgarian music culture. One is the Bulgarian wedding music and the other is Roma music. Bulgarian wedding music in particular covers a wide repertoire and includes "all the additive meters of traditional music, but favors pravo horo (2/4), rachenitsa (7/16, 2-2-3), and lesno." The music, considered "heartfelt", is akin to the Middle Eastern, Mediterranean, and East European forms. However, wedding musicians encounter several issues within their industry, such as auditions, registration, ethnicity, freedom, money, and nationalism.

== Western influence ==
Several western musicians have been influenced by Bulgarian wedding music, particularly its unusual time signatures. American rock guitarist Steve Vai has professed a love of Bulgarian wedding music, describing its time signatures as "completely alien". Bulgarian wedding music was a source of inspiration for the song "Freak Show Excess" from Vai's 2005 album Real Illusions: Reflections.

== Bibliography ==
- Alexander, Ronelle (2000). Intensive Bulgarian: A Textbook and Reference Grammar. University of Wisconsin Press. ISBN 978-0-299-16754-7.
- Bogdanov, Vladimir; Woodstra, Chris; Erlewine, Stephen Thomas (2001). All Music Guide: The Definitive Guide to Popular Music. Backbeat Books/All Media Guide. ISBN 978-0-87930-627-4.
- Degirmenci, Koray (17 January 2013). Creating Global Music in Turkey. Lexington Books. ISBN 978-0-7391-7546-0.
- Slobin, Mark (1996). Retuning Culture: Musical Changes in Central and Eastern Europe. Duke University Press. ISBN 978-0-8223-1847-7.
- Nidel, Richard O (31 December 2004). World Music: The Basics. Taylor & Francis. ISBN 978-0-203-99771-0.
- Rice, Timothy (13 July 1994). May It Fill Your Soul: Experiencing Bulgarian Music. University of Chicago Press. ISBN 978-0-226-71122-5.
