= Haskovo =

City in Bulgaria

Haskovo Хасково
- City
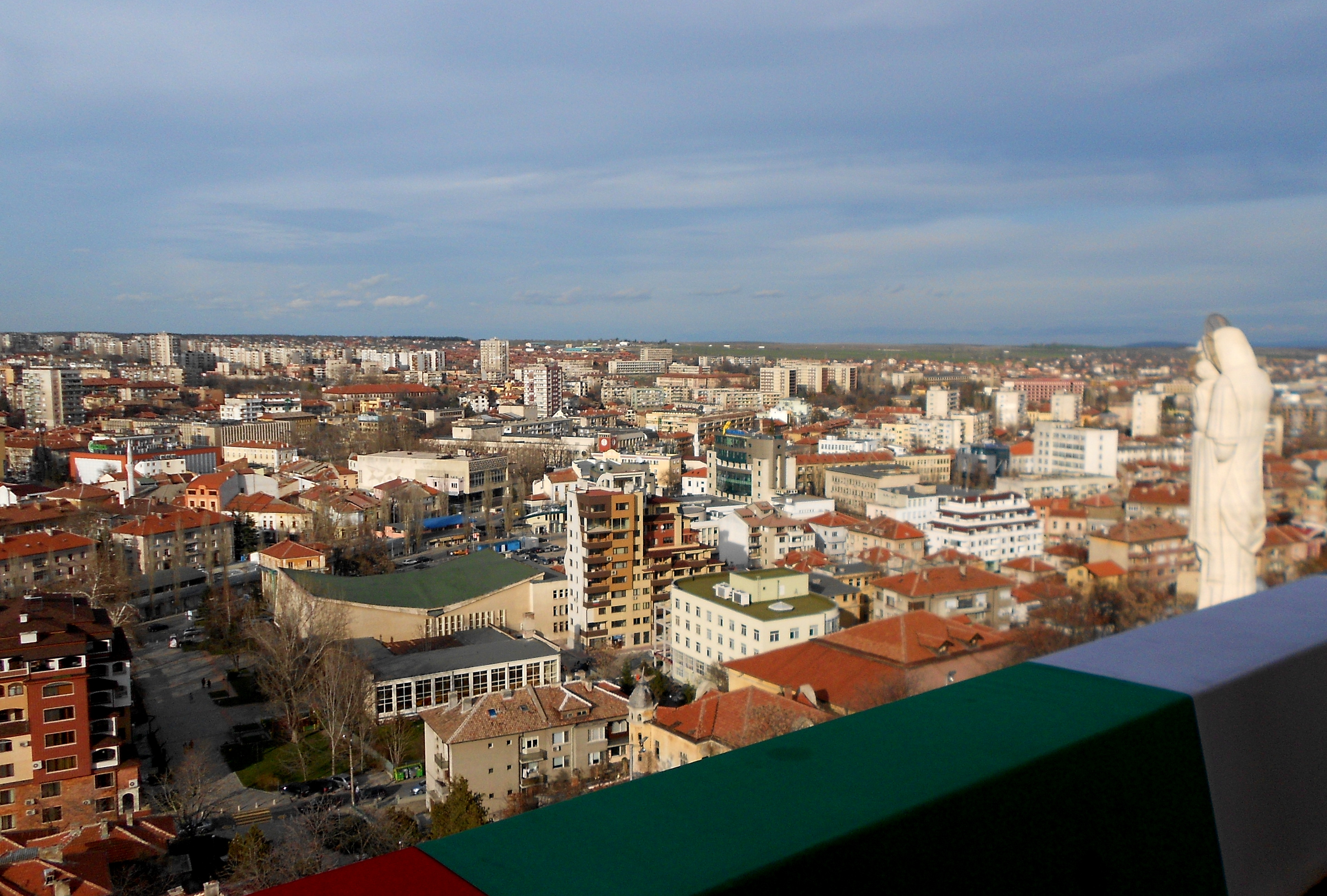
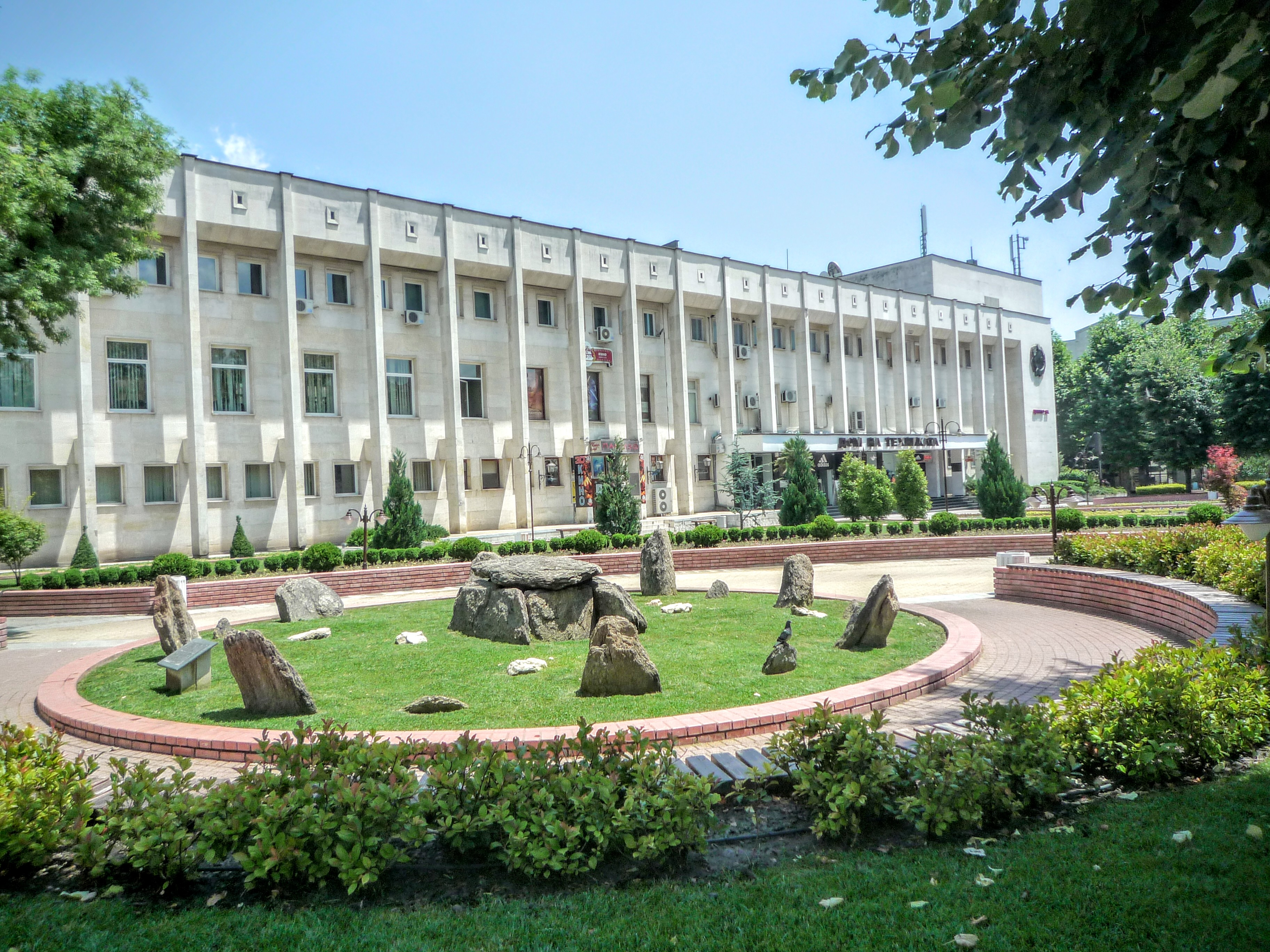
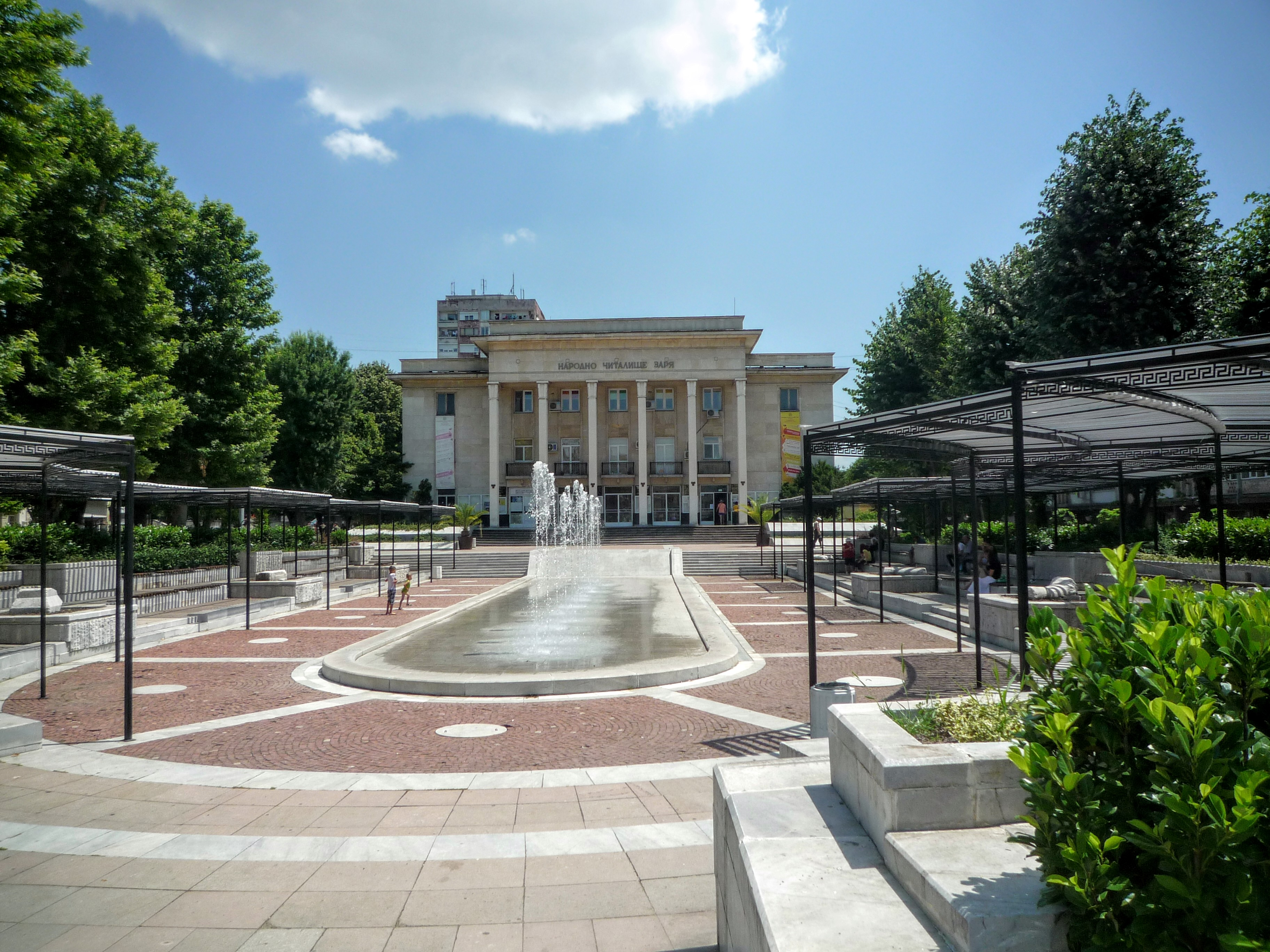
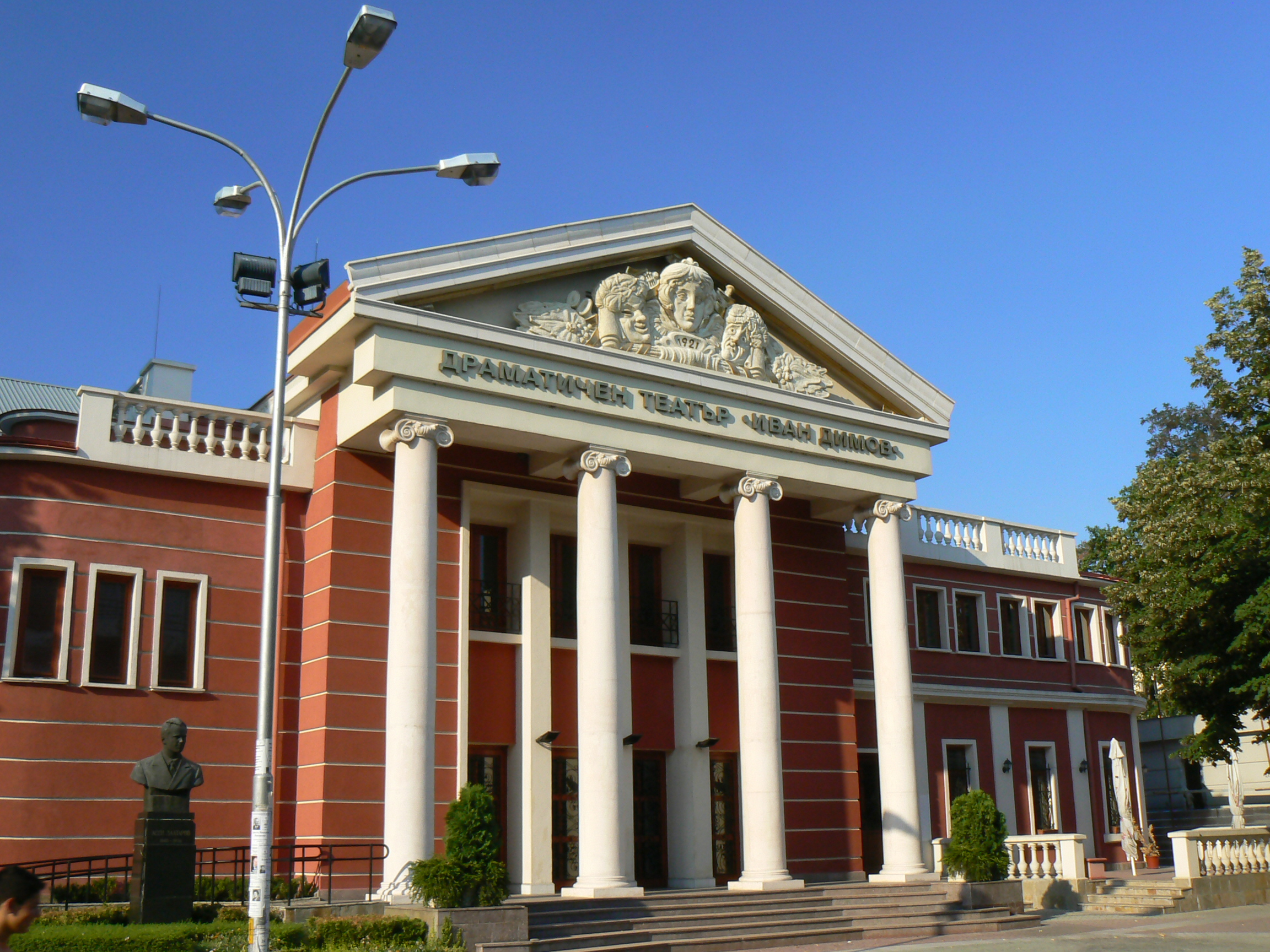
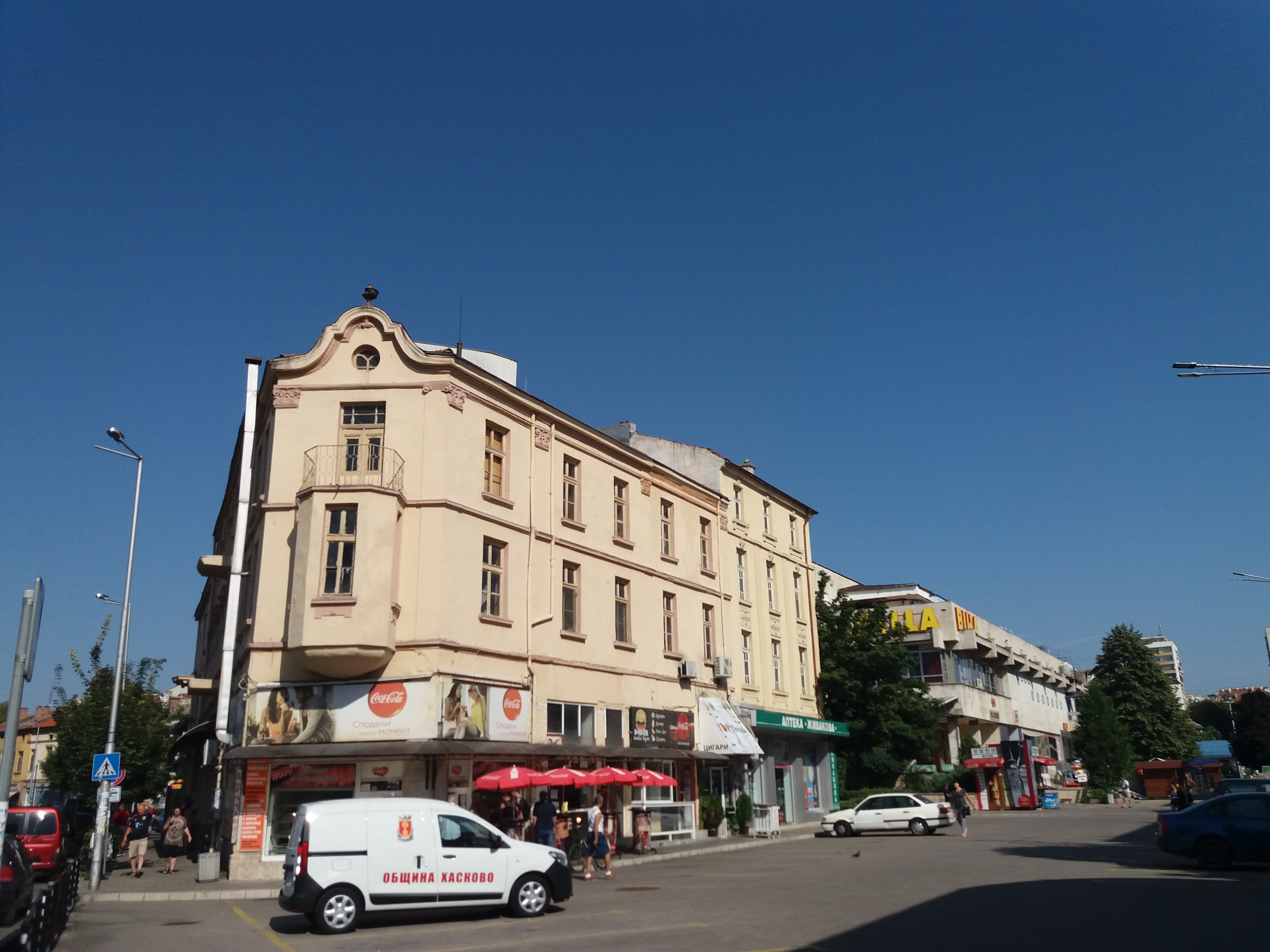
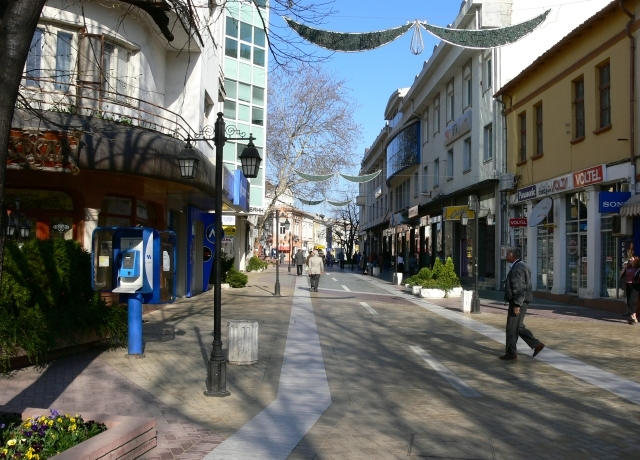
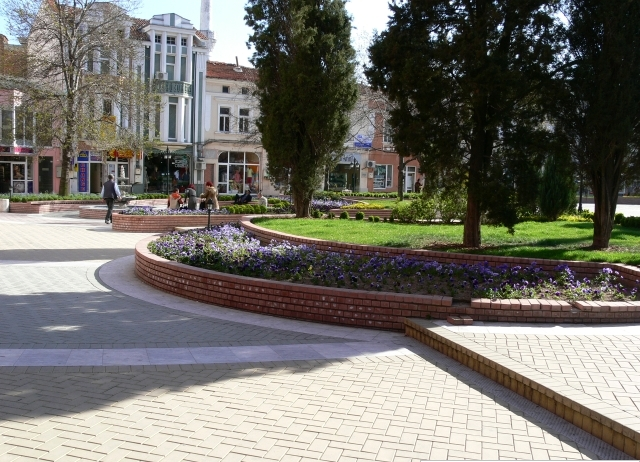
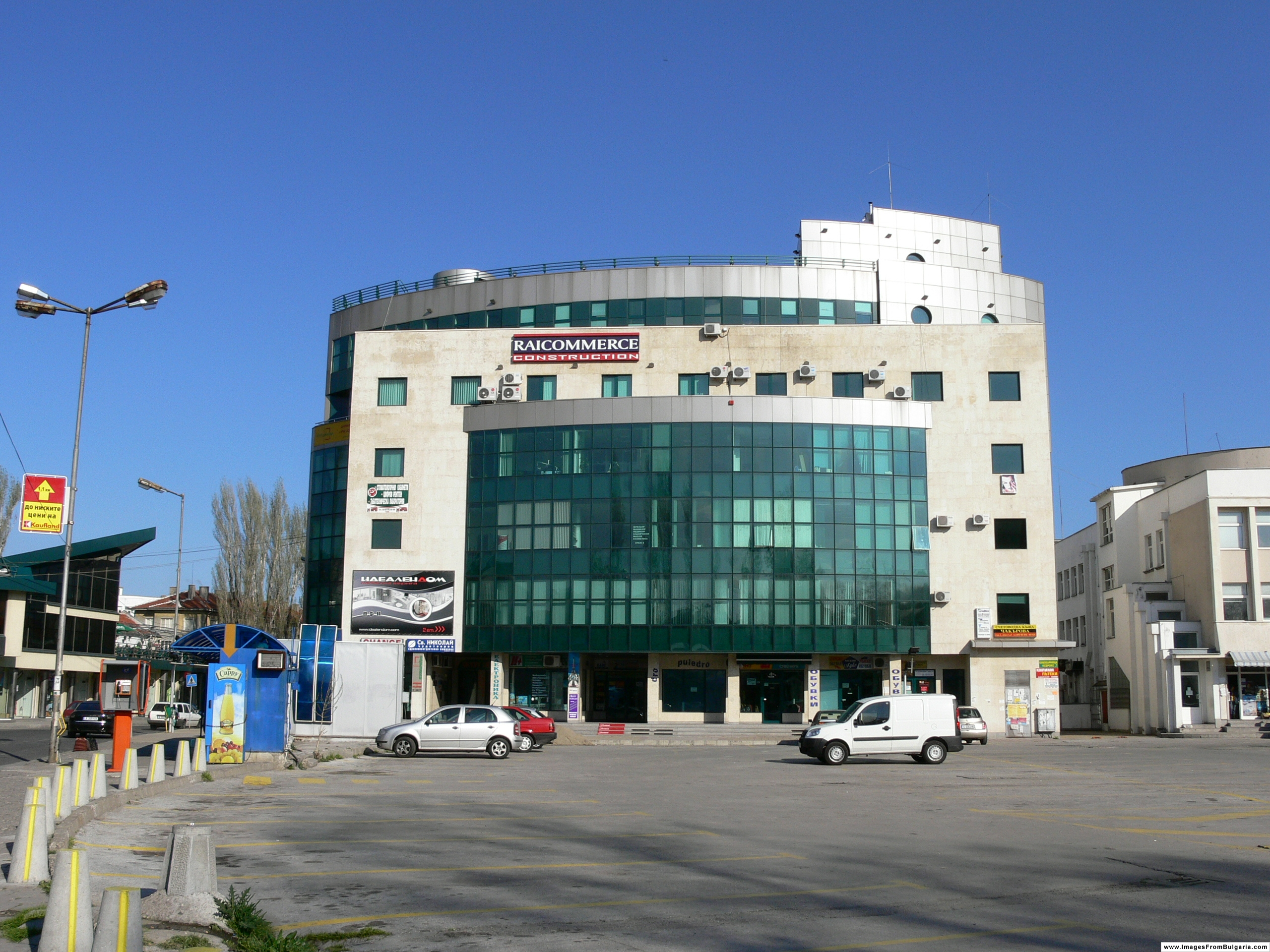
- Haskovo

- Coat of arms

- Location of Haskovo within Bulgaria Haskovo (Balkans) Haskovo (Europe)
- Coordinates: 41°56′N 25°34′E
- Country: Bulgaria
- Province (Oblast): Haskovo

Government
  - Mayor: Stanislav Dechev

Area
  - City: 25.555 km^{2} (9.867 sq mi)
- Elevation: 203 m (666 ft)

Population (2023)
  - City: 64 564
  - Density: 2.5/km^{2} (6.5/sq mi)
  - Urban: 83 682
- Time zone: UTC+2 (EET)
  - Summer (DST): UTC+3 (EEST)
- Postal Code: 6300
- Area code: 038
- Vehicle registration: X
- Website: Official website

Haskovo (Bulgarian: Хасково [ˈxaskovo]) is a city in the region of Northern Thrace in southern Bulgaria and the administrative centre of the Haskovo Province, not far from the borders with Greece and Turkey. According to Operative Program Regional Development of Bulgaria, the urban area of Haskovo is the seventh largest in Bulgaria and has a population of 184,731 inhabitants. Haskovo has a population of 64,564 as of 2022, making it Bulgaria's 12th largest city.

The first settlement found in Haskovo is from circa 5000 BC. Haskovo celebrated its 1,000th anniversary as a town in 1985. To mark the event, a new clock tower was erected in the centre of the town.

Haskovo Cove in Greenwich Island in the South Shetland Islands, Antarctica, is named after Haskovo.

== Geography ==
=== Climate ===
Haskovo has a temperate climate (Köppen: Cfa, Trewartha: Do), closely bordering on a continental climate, with an average yearly temperature of about 13 °C (55 °F). Winters are cold, albeit not as snowy as the western and northern parts of the country. Summers are hot, and late-summer is somewhat dry.

Climate data for Haskovo, Bulgaria
Month	Jan	Feb	Mar	Apr	May	Jun	Jul	Aug	Sep	Oct	Nov	Dec	Year
Record high °C (°F)	18.7 (65.7)	22.4 (72.3)	27.4 (81.3)	32.8 (91.0)	36.0 (96.8)	38.4 (101.1)	40.6 (105.1)	41.8 (107.2)	38.1 (100.6)	35.0 (95.0)	28.9 (84.0)	20.0 (68.0)	41.8 (107.2)
Mean daily maximum °C (°F)	4.6 (40.3)	7.5 (45.5)	11.9 (53.4)	18.7 (65.7)	23.8 (74.8)	27.6 (81.7)	30.5 (86.9)	30.8 (87.4)	26.7 (80.1)	20.1 (68.2)	13.0 (55.4)	7.0 (44.6)	18.5 (65.3)
Daily mean °C (°F)	0.2 (32.4)	2.6 (36.7)	6.2 (43.2)	12.3 (54.1)	17.2 (63.0)	21.0 (69.8)	23.6 (74.5)	23.4 (74.1)	19.1 (66.4)	13.4 (56.1)	8.1 (46.6)	3.0 (37.4)	12.5 (54.5)
Mean daily minimum °C (°F)	−3.7 (25.3)	−1.6 (29.1)	1.2 (34.2)	6.0 (42.8)	10.7 (51.3)	14.2 (57.6)	16.2 (61.2)	15.8 (60.4)	12.2 (54.0)	7.8 (46.0)	4.0 (39.2)	−0.7 (30.7)	6.8 (44.2)
Record low °C (°F)	−25.5 (−13.9)	−24.5 (−12.1)	−16.8 (1.8)	−6.0 (21.2)	-0.0 (32.0)	5.7 (42.3)	9.7 (49.5)	6.4 (43.5)	1.1 (34.0)	−5.9 (21.4)	−14.5 (5.9)	−19.4 (−2.9)	−25.5 (−13.9)
Average precipitation mm (inches)	63 (2.5)	47 (1.9)	50 (2.0)	57 (2.2)	67 (2.6)	69 (2.7)	40 (1.6)	37 (1.5)	34 (1.3)	61 (2.4)	67 (2.6)	75 (3.0)	667 (26.3)
Mean monthly sunshine hours	102	124	173	216	270	302	336	325	241	172	127	92	2,480
Source: [Stringmeteo.com]

== Etymology ==
The name of the town is derived from its earlier Ottoman-era name Hasköy, which is a hybrid Arabic-Turkish compound meaning "special village" (Turkish has "special" via Arabic خَاصّ + Turkish köy "village"). It was so named after it became the centre of an Ottoman administrative district in the region. The ancient Thracian name of the settlement was Marsa (Greek: Μάρσα), by which it was known until as late as 1782. By 1830, it was known by its Turkish name, Hasköy. The Bulgarian (and common Slavic) placename suffix "-ovo" replaced the Turkish "köy" after the city switched to Bulgarian from Ottoman rule.

== History ==
According to archeologists, the area of Haskovo was originally settled about seven thousand years ago. In and around Haskovo, evidence has been preserved that confirms its long history during the prehistoric, Thracian, Greek, Roman, and Byzantine periods. In the 9th century – during the First Bulgarian Empire – a fortress was built in Haskovo that soon was transformed into a town. The town was located at the centre of a sizable region between the Klokotnitsa, Harmanliyska, and Maritsa rivers.

=== Ottoman era ===
The village and surrounding area became part of the Ottoman Empire shortly after the conquest of Edirne in 1361. During the time of Mehmed the Conqueror, Hasköy, as it was then known, was settled by around 750 people, consisting of 150 Muslim families spread across 12 neighbourhoods: Hacı Mahmud, Îsâ Fakih, Sofular, Saraç İnebey, Saraç Musa, Hacı Kayalı, Cüllâh, Hacı İsmâil, Kadı, Debbâğlar, Hacı Bayezid and Dervişan. The village acquired a largely agricultural character during most of the Ottoman period; there was also a thriving cottage industry and craftsmen such as saddlers, tanners, shoemakers, furriers and soapmakers, dyers, and chandlers made their home in Hasköy. In 1515 the population increased to 1400 people in 274 households, and in 1530 it was recorded that there was one Friday mosque (cami) as well as six smaller mosques in the village.

In 1592, the Ottoman Grand Vizier Sinan Pasha commissioned the building of two caravanserais, two baths, shops, a mosque and an almshouse at the request of the people. According to the Austrian historian and orientalist Joseph von Hammer-Purgstall, Sinan Pasha also inaugurated the nearby Uzuncaova (Uzundzhovo) fair, which would become famous in all of Ottoman Bulgaria.

The town's importance increased in the 19th century. With its markets and fairs Hasköy became a significant centre of commerce in the Sanjak (District) of Filibe. At the same time, an increasing number of Bulgarians and other minorities came to settle in the town. By the second half of the century the population had grown to about 6000 people, of whom 3500 were non-Muslims and only 2500 were Turks. In the 1870s Hasköy was a hotbed of revolutionary activity during the Bulgarian National Revival and subsequent Russo-Turkish War of 1877-1878, after which de facto Ottoman control of the town came to an end.

=== Modern era ===
Haskovo was part of Eastern Rumelia from 1878–1885, and was then incorporated into the autonomous Principality of Bulgaria, which declared full independence from the Ottoman Empire in 1908. It was renamed Haskovo after Bulgarian independence.

After the liberation from Ottoman rule in 1878, the Haskovo region became popular for high-quality tobacco production. However, presently there is no cigarette production in the region anymore after the once big Tobacco company "Haskovo-BT" closed in 2005. Currently, the biggest enterprises produce food, machinery, and textiles.

== Population ==
The population of Haskovo was 14,191 in 1887. Since then it started growing decade by decade, mostly because of the migrants from the rural areas and the surrounding smaller towns. It reached its peak in the period 1987–1991, when the population exceeded 90,000.

Historical population
Year	Pop.	±%
1887	14,191	—
1910	15,067	+6.2%
1934	26,516	+76.0%
1946	27,435	+3.5%
1956	38,812	+41.5%
1965	57,681	+48.6%
1975	75,136	+30.3%
1985	87,763	+16.8%
1992	80,700	−8.0%
2001	80,303	−0.5%
2011	76,397	−4.9%
2021	65,829	−13.8%
Source: Censuses

In December 2017, Haskovo's population was 71,214 people within the city limits. The Haskovo Municipality, with the legally affiliated adjacent villages, had a population of 87,780.

=== Ethnic and religious composition ===
According to the 2011 census data, the individuals declared their ethnic identity were distributed as follows:

- Bulgarians: 54,869 (79.3%)
- Turks: 12,507 (18.1%)
- Roma: 691 (1.0%)
- Others: 400 (0.8%)
- Indefinable: 709 (0.7%)
- Undeclared: 7,221 (9.5%)

Total: 76,397

In Haskovo Municipality 63,963 declared as Bulgarians, 16,890 as Turks, 3859 as Roma and 8,984 did not declare their ethnic group. Most of the 28,444 Turks (12.5%) in Haskovo Province are concentrated within the city and the municipality, while the Bulgarians have a higher proportion in the province than the city, numbering 180,541 (79.4%).

According to the 2001 census, the Orthodox Christians are around 80% vs. around 20% Muslims.

== Culture ==
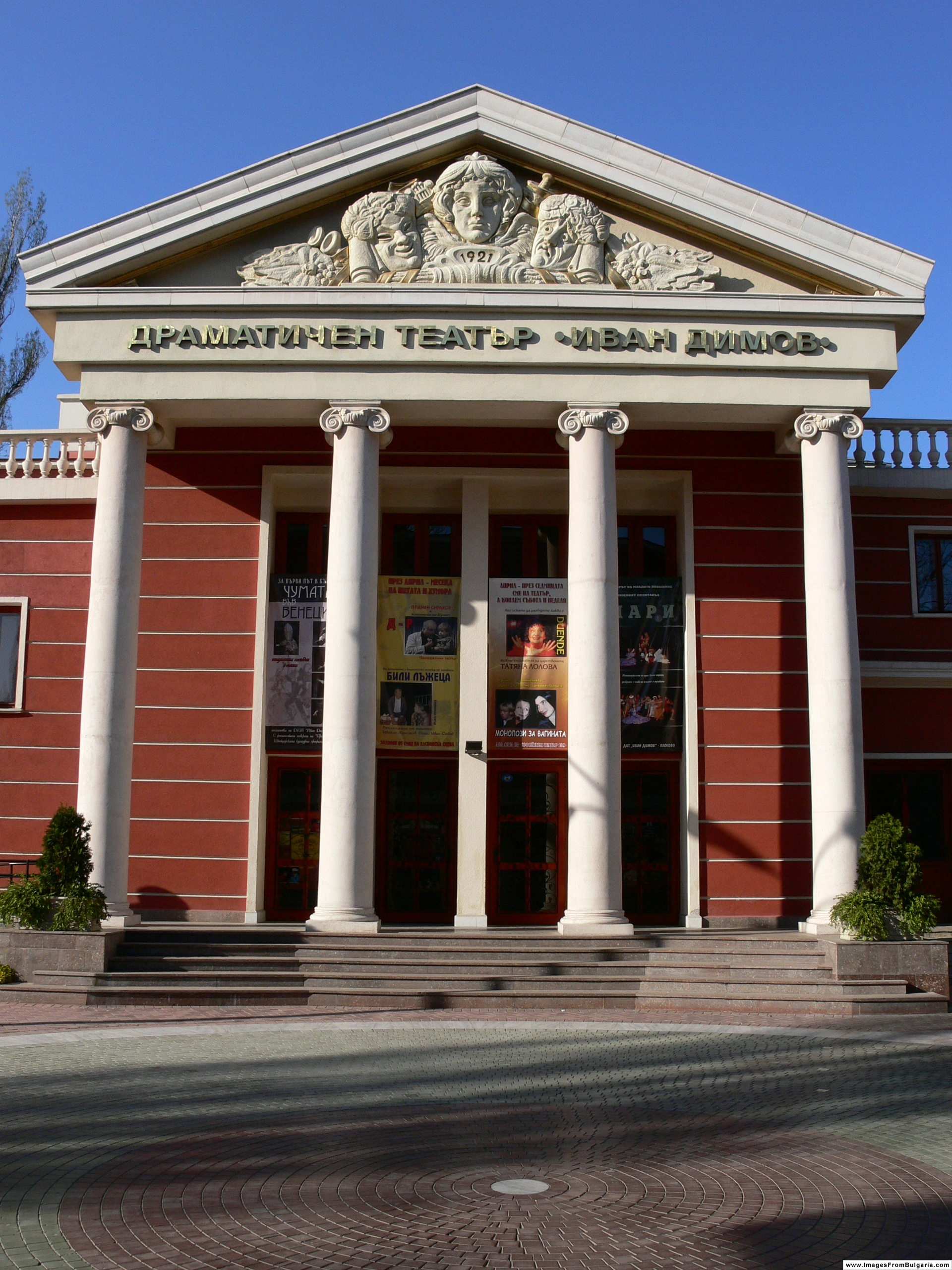
Ivan Dimov Drama Theatre (est. 1921), named after the well-known Bulgarian actor

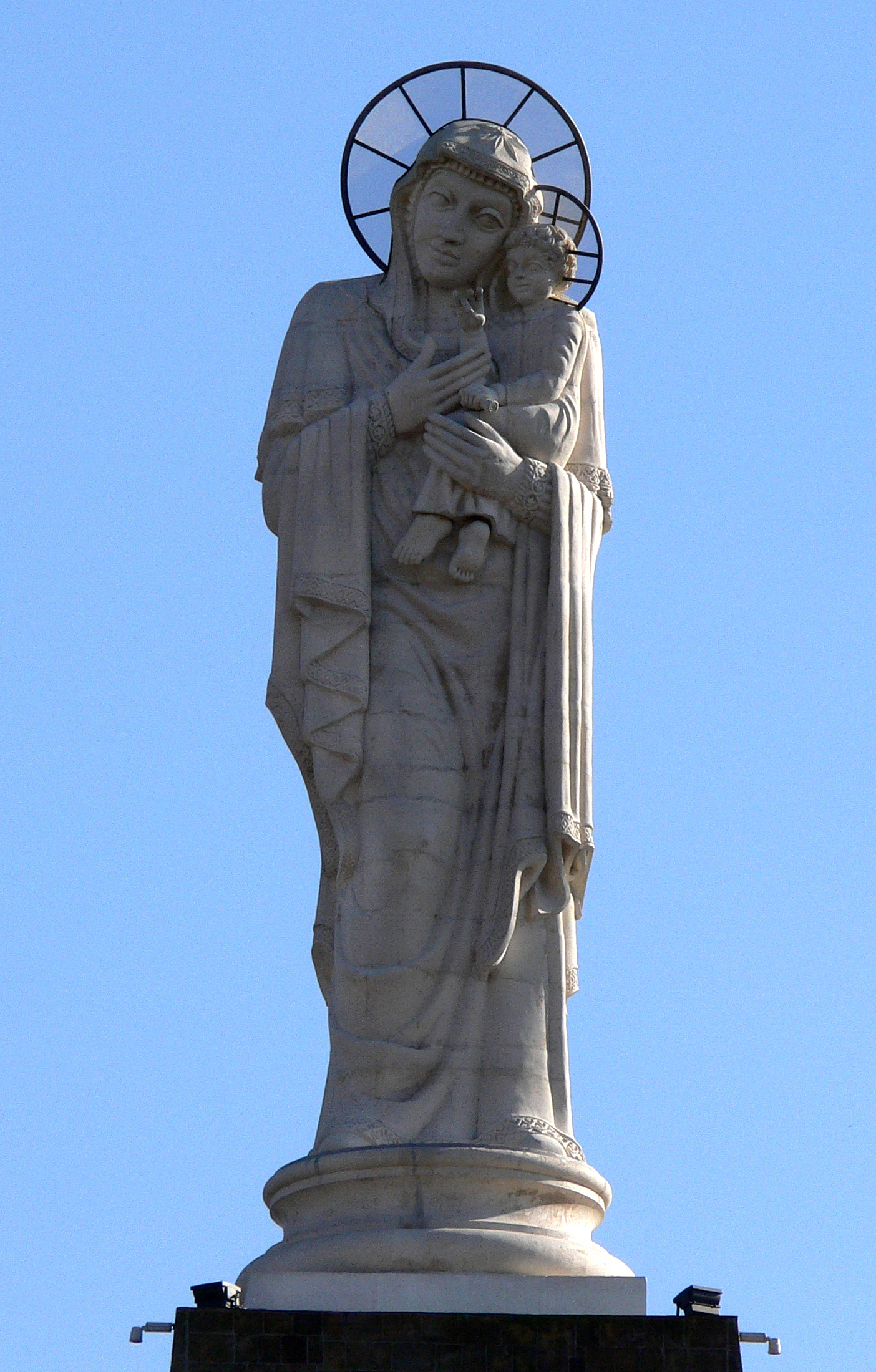
The Monument of the Holy Mother of God, one of the world's highest monument of the Virgin Mary

The most notable cultural landmarks in Haskovo are the Ivan Dimov drama theater, renovated in 2004, the Museum of History, and an art gallery. The annual Colourful Thrace Sings and Dances folk festival takes place in the nearby park Kenana.

A 32-metre-high monument of the Mother of God and the Infant Jesus was erected on the Hill of Youth near Haskovo in 2003. The monument was inaugurated on 8 September on the occasion of the Nativity of Holy Virgin Mary, when the day of the town of Haskovo is celebrated. It was entered into the Guinness Book of Records as the highest monument to the Mother of God in the world.

Haskovo has recently invested in renovating its town center, with a variety of new sculptures and fountains erected.

Municipal landmarks include the Thracian Aleksandrovo tomb as well as Uzundzhovo's Church of the Assumption, built originally as a mosque during Ottoman times. In 1395 the Eski cami (the Old Mosque) was built as one of the first in the Balkans. Its minaret is slightly inclined.

== Notable people ==
- Tane Nikolov (1873–1947), revolutionary
- Asen Zlatarov (1885–1936), scientist
- Anyu Angelov (1942), acting Minister of Defence
- Stanimir Stoilov (b. 1967), footballer and football manager
- Grigor Dimitrov (b. 1991), tennis player; 2008 Wimbledon and US Open junior champion
- Georgi Andreev (b. 1969), director of the National Folk Ensemble "Filip Kutev"
- Ciguli (1957–2014), Turkish-romani singer and musician
- Yuri Yunakov (b. 1958), Roma musician, known for participating in the development of Bulgarian wedding music and introducing it to the United States
- Asparuh Leshnikov – Ari (b. 1897–1978), musician
- Assen Vassilev (b. 1977), economist and politician
- Gabriela Stoeva (b. 1994) badminton player, three-time European Champion and European Games gold medalist as well

== Places to visit ==
=== Monuments ===
- Monument to Captain Petko Voivoda
- Monument to the Unknown Warrior
- Monument to the Haskovo Revivalists
- Monument to the 10th Rhodope Infantry Regiment
- Monument of Envy
- Monument to the Haskovo Revivalists
- Monument to the Victory
- Monument to Dimitar Ivanov-Litso

=== Sacred architecture ===
- The monument "Holy Mother of God" entered the Guinness World Records as the world's tallest statue of the Blessed Virgin Mary with the Infant. The monument was erected with respect, love and gratitude to the Mother of God. It was opened in 2003 with the consecration of water by Metropolitan Arseniy. In 2005 it was entered in the Guinness Book of World Records, and since 2009 it is in the list of the Hundred National Tourist Sites of Bulgaria.
- The bell tower - with impressive dimensions and unforgettable views rises above the town of Haskovo. The almost 29-meter-high bell tower was erected in 2010 next to the Holy Mother of God monument and quickly took its place in the resulting architectural ensemble.
- The Old Mosque (Eski Mosque) is the earliest mosque in the Bulgarian lands. It was built immediately after the invasion of the Ottoman Turks in Bulgaria, in the year 797 AH (1395 AD). In 1968 the Eski Mosque was declared a cultural monument. Currently, the mosque is significantly dug into the ground (probably due to the rising level of the surrounding streets).
- The Church of the Assumption of the Blessed Virgin in the village of Uzundzhovo, near Haskovo, is unique not only in its architecture, but also in the history it tells. Created as a Christian temple, it was destroyed by the Ottoman Empire and a mosque was built in its place. At the beginning of the 20th century, Turkey returned the property to Bulgaria and then began the reconstruction of the mosque into a church. In 2007 the church was restored mainly by the Municipality of Haskovo. During the restoration, two medieval inscriptions in Arabic with religious and philosophical themes were found, which have not yet been precisely dated. In the last century, the Church of the Assumption of the Blessed Virgin Mary in the village of Uzundzhovo was declared a cultural monument.

== Twin towns – sister cities ==
Haskovo is twinned with:

- Edirne, Turkey
- Enguera, Spain
- Leicester, England, United Kingdom
- Shatura, Russia
- Veszprém, Hungary
- Viseu, Portugal

== Economy ==
The branch structure of the economy of Haskovo municipality is diverse and consists of Bulgarian and international companies of different sizes. These companies sell their products in both foreign and domestic markets.

The future development of the municipality is related to the full use of natural and climatic conditions in the field of agriculture - for example, efforts to develop market-oriented agricultural production, and creation of agricultural consulting centers. Features of interest for tourism include the region's culture, transport, and infrastructure. The partnership relations established by the municipality with cities from England, Austria, France, Greece, Turkey, Italy, Spain, Portugal, the US, Russia, Serbia, and Belarus have also contributed in this respect.

== Gallery ==
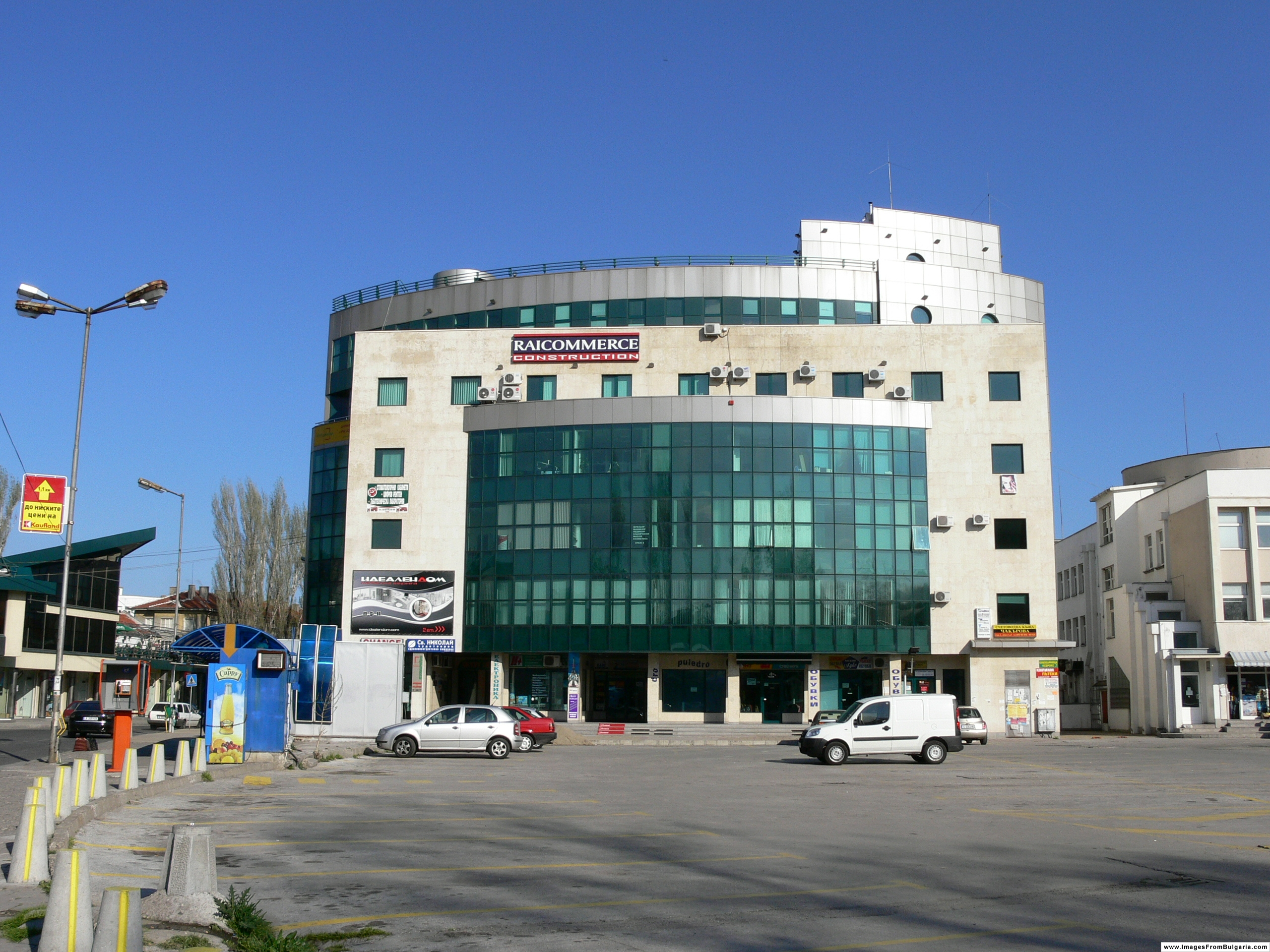
New office building

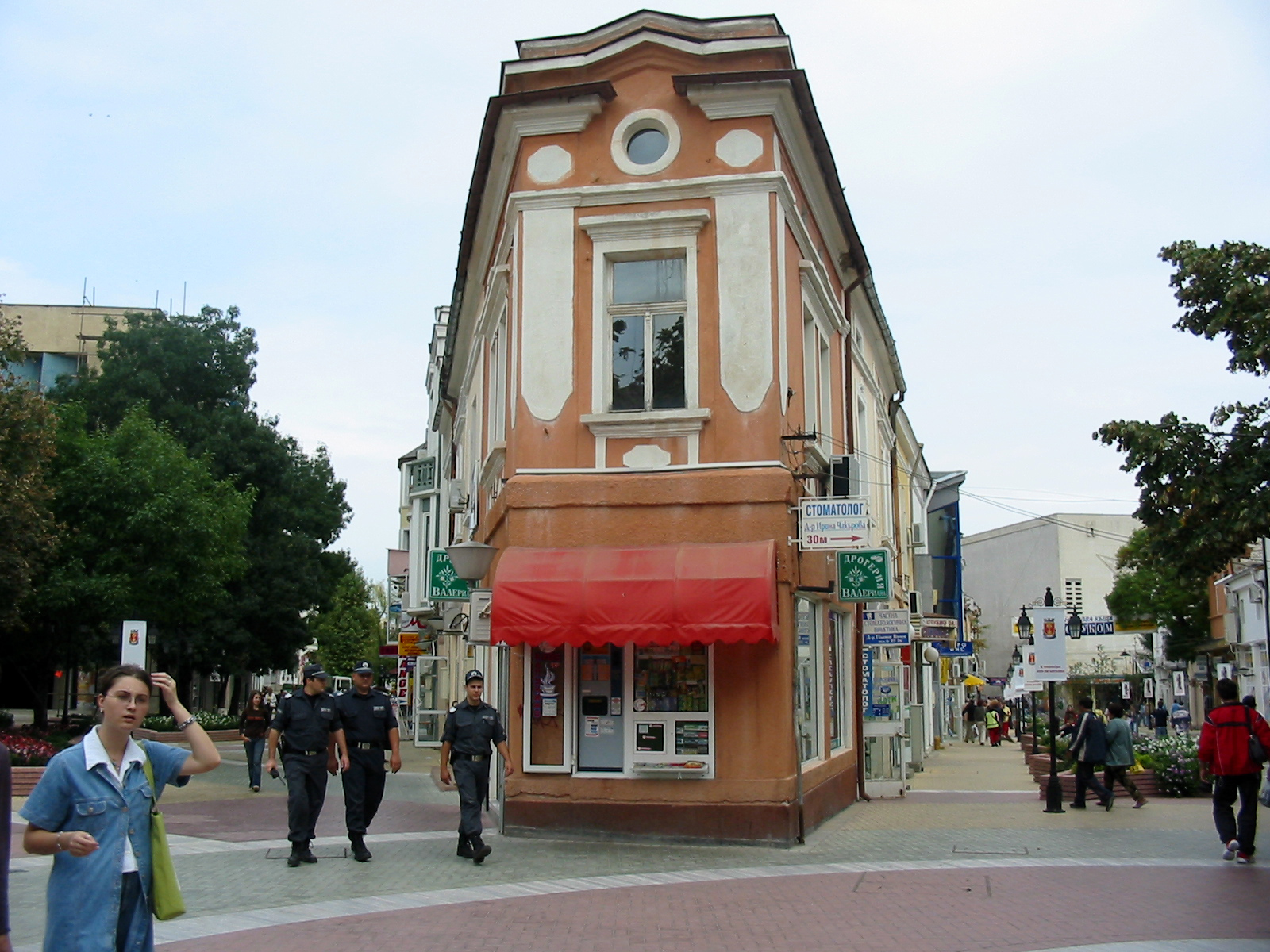
City centre

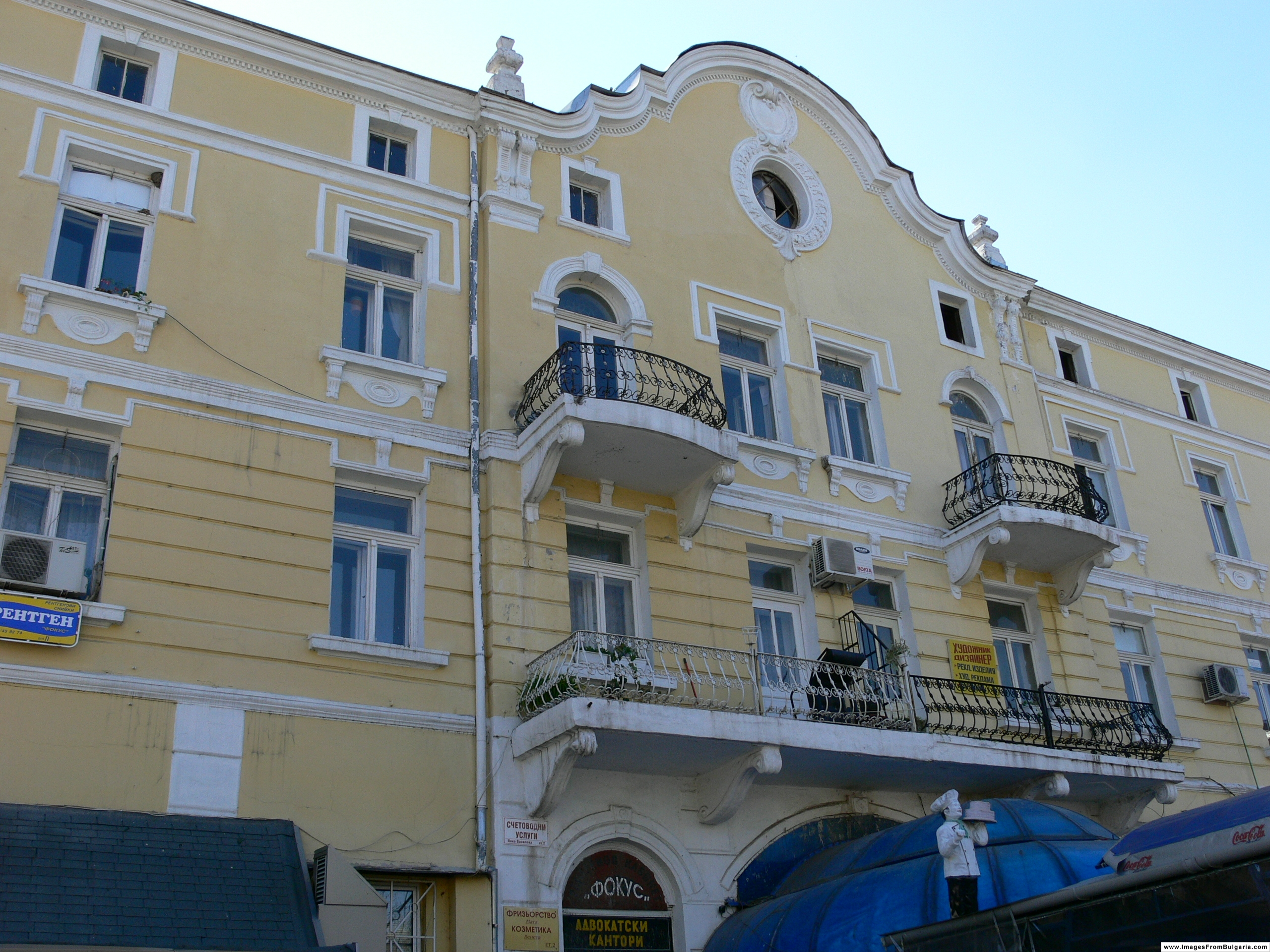
Building

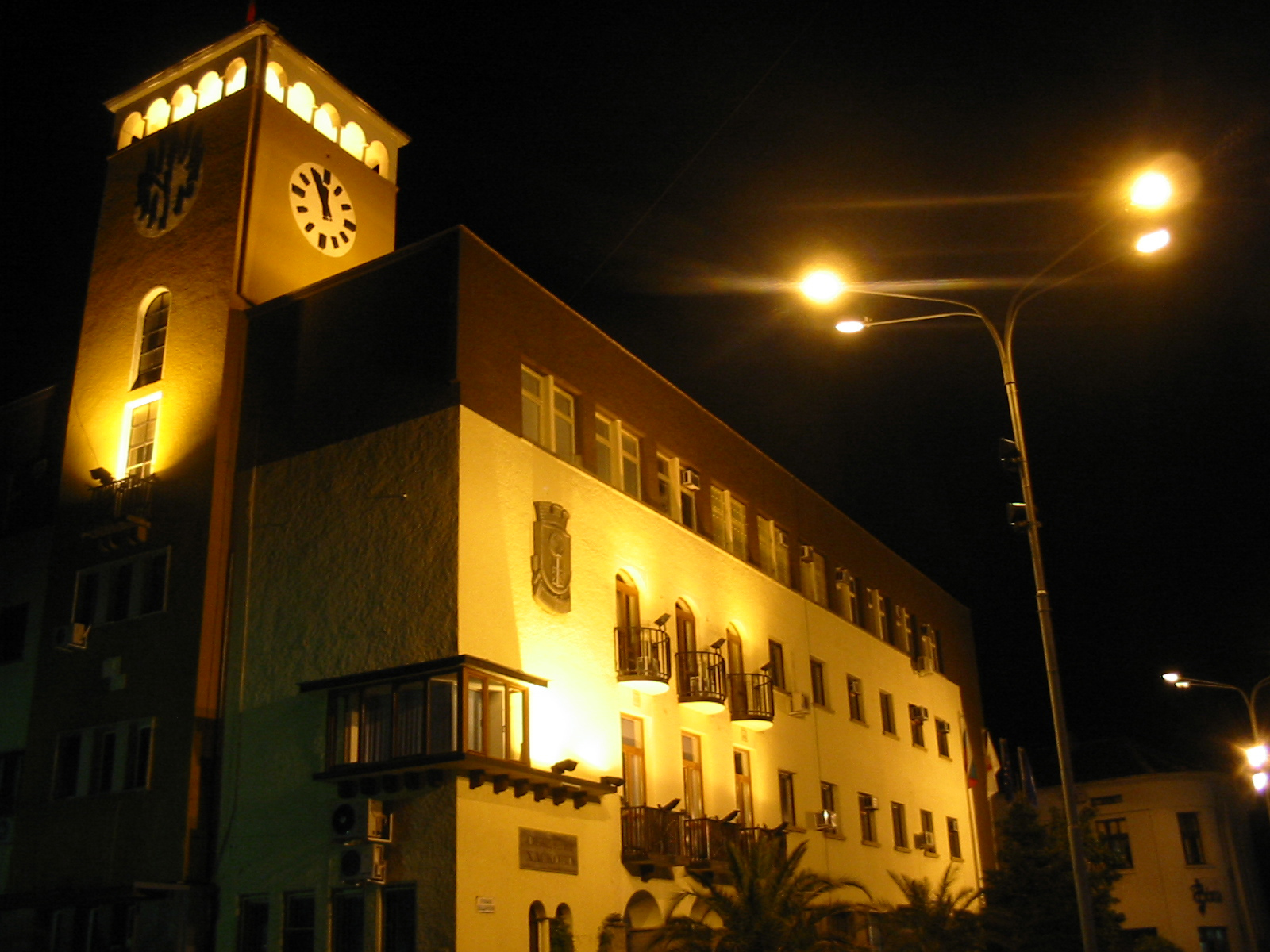
Haskovo municipality hall

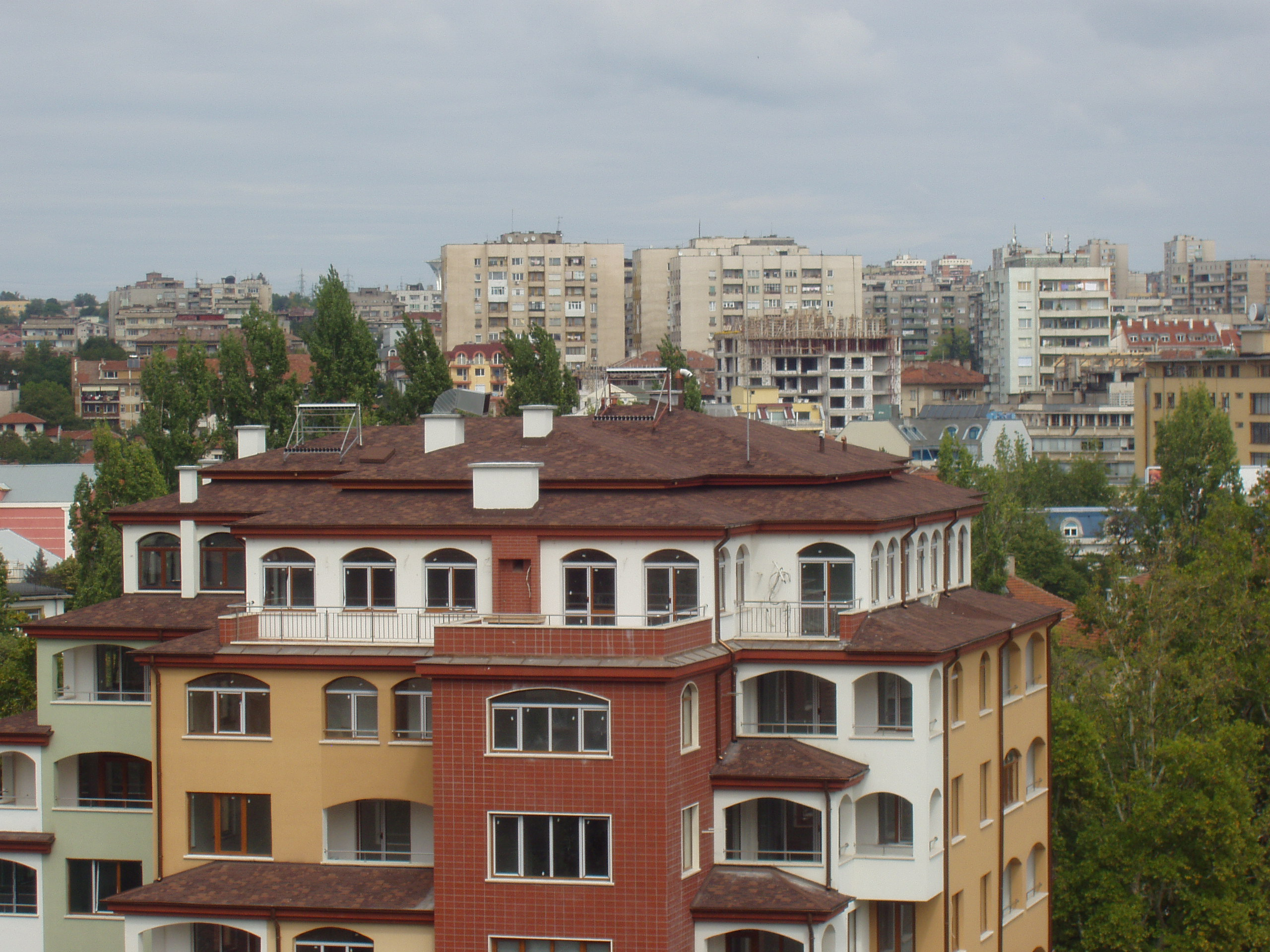
View from Virgin Mary monument

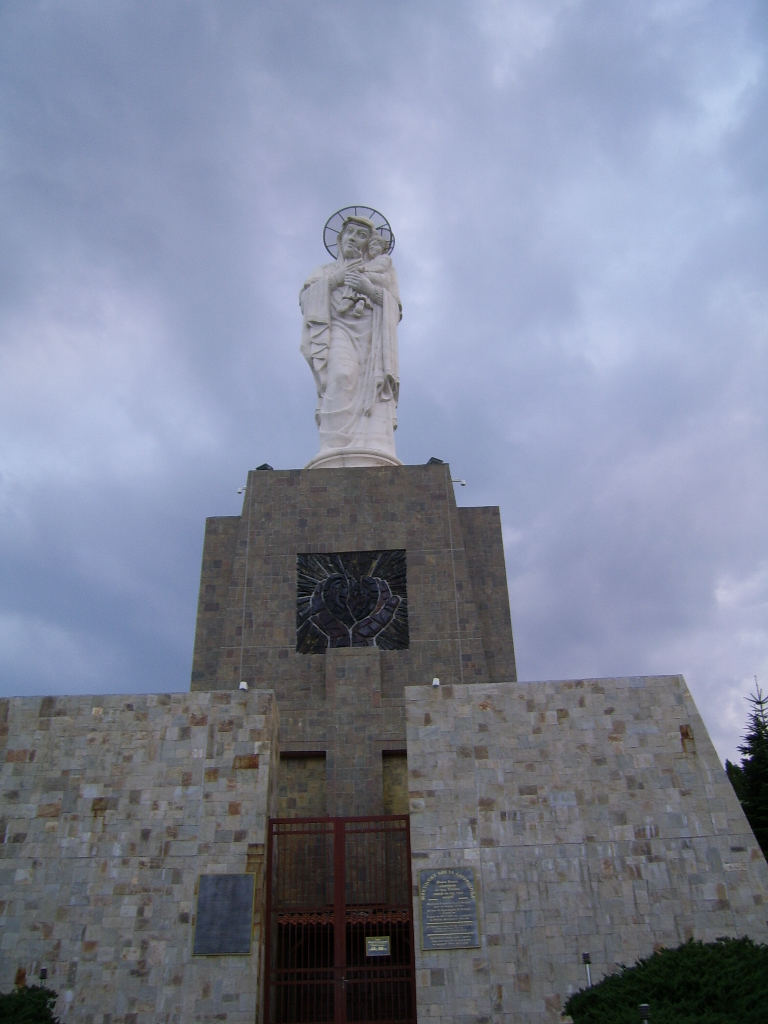
The Virgin Mary monument
