= Chernoochene =

Chernoochene Черноочене
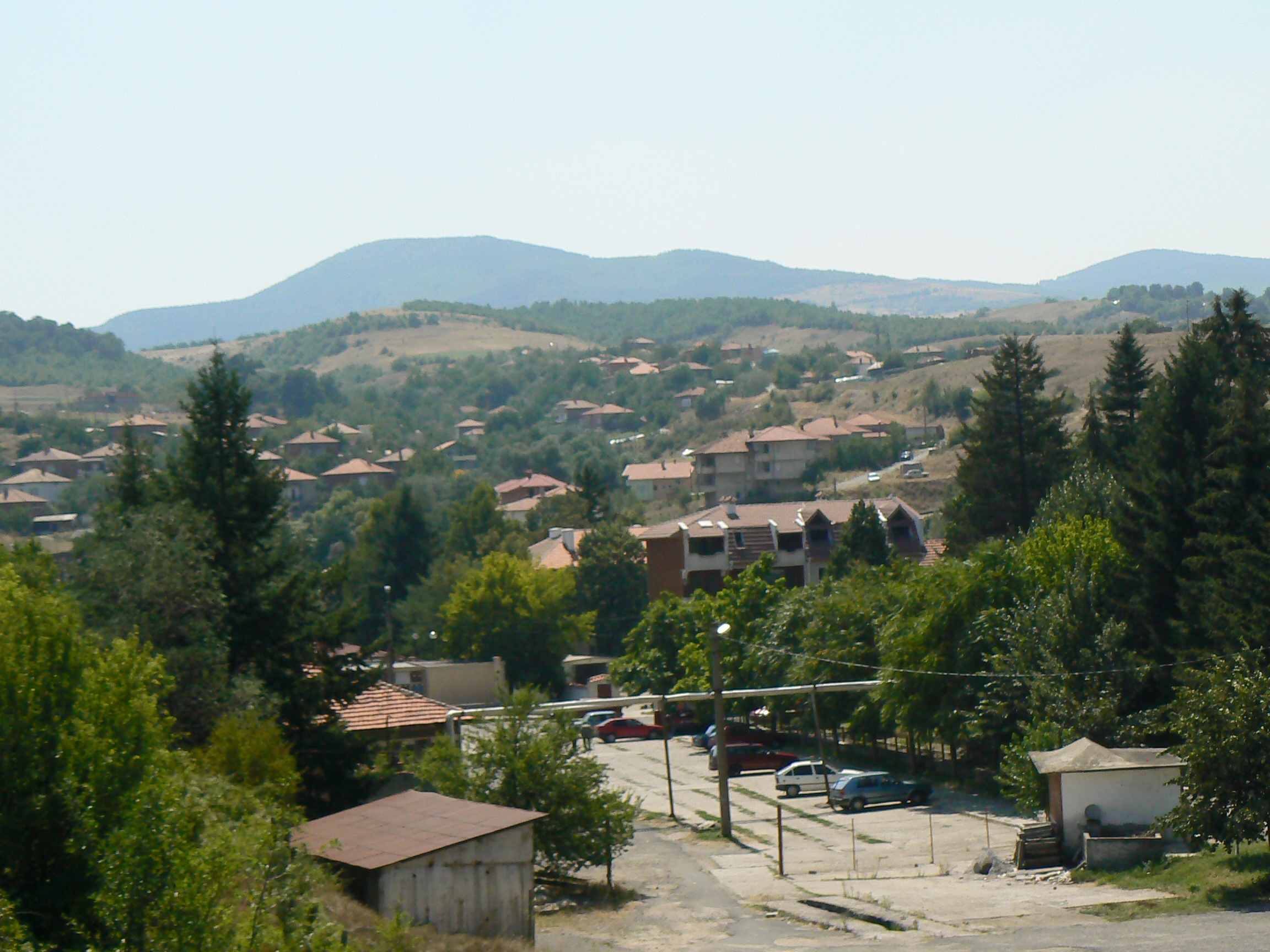
- Overview of the village

- Location of Chernoochene
- Coordinates: 41°46′N 25°21′E
- Country: Bulgaria
- Provinces (Oblast): Kardzhali

Government
  - Mayor: Aydan Osman
- Elevation: 564 m (1,850 ft)

Population (2008)
  - Total: 335
- Time zone: UTC+2 (EET)
  - Summer (DST): UTC+3 (EEST)
- Postal Code: 6701
- Area code: 03691

Chernoochene (Bulgarian: Черноочене, pronounced [t͡ʃɛrnuˈɔt͡ʃɛnɛ]); is a village in central southern Bulgaria, part of Kardzhali Province. It is the administrative centre of Chernoochene municipality, which comprises in the northernmost part of Kardzhali Province. The village is located in the Eastern Rhodope Mountains and has a predominantly Turkish population. The village's name roughly means "place of the black-eyed people" in Bulgarian and (as Karagözler) in Turkish.

== Municipality ==
Chernoochene municipality covers an area of 339 square kilometres and includes the following 51 places:

- Bakalite
- Barza Reka
- Bedrovo
- Bezvodno
- Beli Vir
- Besnurka
- Bozhurtsi
- Borovsko
- Bosilitsa
- Bostantsi
- Cherna Niva
- Chernoochene
- Daskalovo
- Draganovo
- Dushka
- Dyadovsko
- Gabrovo
- Kableshkovo
- Kanyak
- Komuniga
- Kopitnik
- Kutsovo
- Lyaskovo
- Minzuhar
- Murga
- Nebeska
- Nochevo
- Novi Pazar
- Novoselishte
- Panichkovo
- Patitsa
- Pchelarovo
- Petelovo
- Pryaporets
- Rusalina
- Sokolite
- Srednevo
- Sredska
- Strazhnitsa
- Svobodinovo
- Vazel
- Versko
- Vodach
- Voynovo
- Vozhdovo
- Yabalcheni
- Yavorovo
- Yonchovo
- Zheleznik
- Zhenda
- Zhitnitsa
