= Harmanliyska reka =

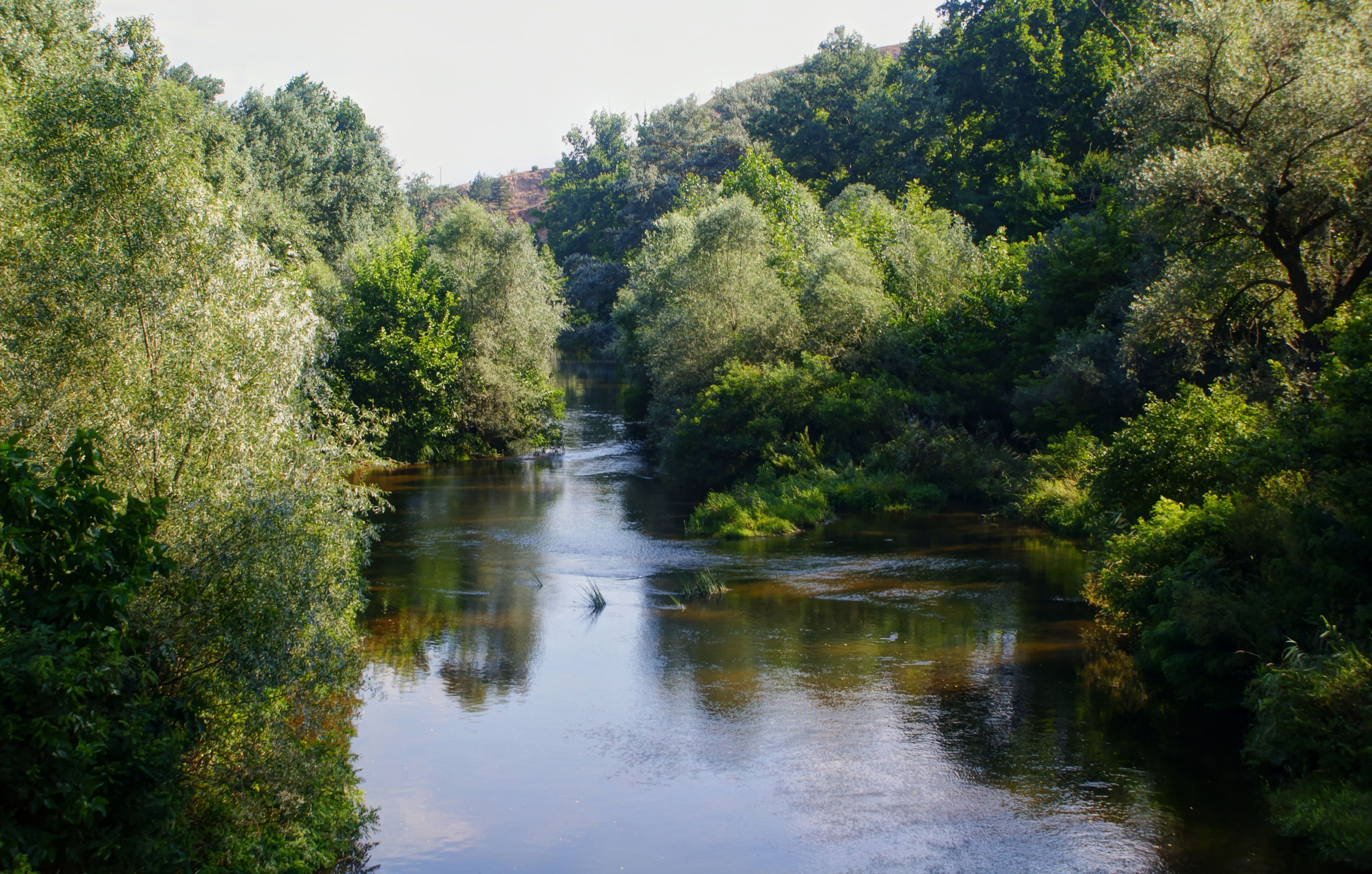

Location
- Country: Bulgaria

Physical characteristics
- Source
  - location: Eastern Rhodope Mountains
  - coordinates: 41°51′21.96″N 25°9′7.92″E
  - elevation: 755 m (2,477 ft)
- Mouth
  - location: Maritsa
  - coordinates: 41°56′13.92″N 25°55′41.88″E
  - elevation: 73 m (240 ft)
- Length: 92 km (57 mi)
- Basin size: 956 km^{2} (369 sq mi)

Basin features
- Progression: Maritsa→ Aegean Sea

The Harmanliyska reka (Bulgarian: Харманлийска река) is a river in southern Bulgaria, a right tributary of the Maritsa. It is 92 km in length. The river drains the eastern slopes of the Mechkovets ridge, the northern slopes of the ridges Chukata and Huhla, and large areas of the Haskovo hills, all part of the Eastern Rhodope Mountains.

== Geography ==
The river takes its source from the Velichka spring at an altitude of 755 m, situated near the second class II-58 road Asenovgrad–Kardzhali some 1.5 km west of the Panichkovo resort in the Eastern Rhodope Mountains. It flows in a deep forested valley until the village of Boyan Botevo, where it turns southeast and flows through the Haskovo hills in a narrow shallow valley. Downstream of the village of Malevo the Harmanliyska reka turns in northeastern direction and after Stoykovo it bends eastwards, bypassing the Huhla ridge from the north in a valley with steep slopes on the right bank and oblique slopes on the left one. It forms a 9–10 gorge before reaching the town of Harmanli, where the river flows into the Maritsa at an altitude of 73 m about 1.3 km northeast of the town.

Its drainage basin covers a territory of 956 km^{2} or 1.8% of the Maritsa's total and borders the drainage basins of the Banska to the north and northwest, the Biserska reka to the southeast and the Arda to the southwest, all of them right tributaries of the Maritsa.

The Harmanliyska reka has predominantly rain–snow feed with high water in February–March and low water in August. The average annual flow near the Harmanli is 5.47 m^{3}/s. The record flow was measured on 12 February 1942 — 708 m^{3}/s. The mineralization of the water is 300–400 mg/dm^{3}. The average annual water temperature of the river at Harmanli reaches 12.3 °C. It freezes for an average of 10 to 20 days a year.

== Settlements and economy ==
The Harmanliyska reka flows in Haskovo and Kardzhali Provinces. There are eight settlements along its course, one town and seven villages. The only settlement in Kardzhali Province is the village of Nochevo in Chernoochene Municipality. In Haskovo Province are located Trakiets, Konush, Voyvodovo, Malevo, Dinevo and Bryagovo in Haskovo Municipality, as well as the town of Harmanli in Harmanli Municipality.

A 9 km section of the first class I-8 road Kalotina–Sofia–Plovdiv–Kapitan Andreevo follows its right bank between Stoykovo and Bryagovo. Its waters are utilised for irrigation. In the upper course is situated the Trakiets Reservoir.

== Gallery ==
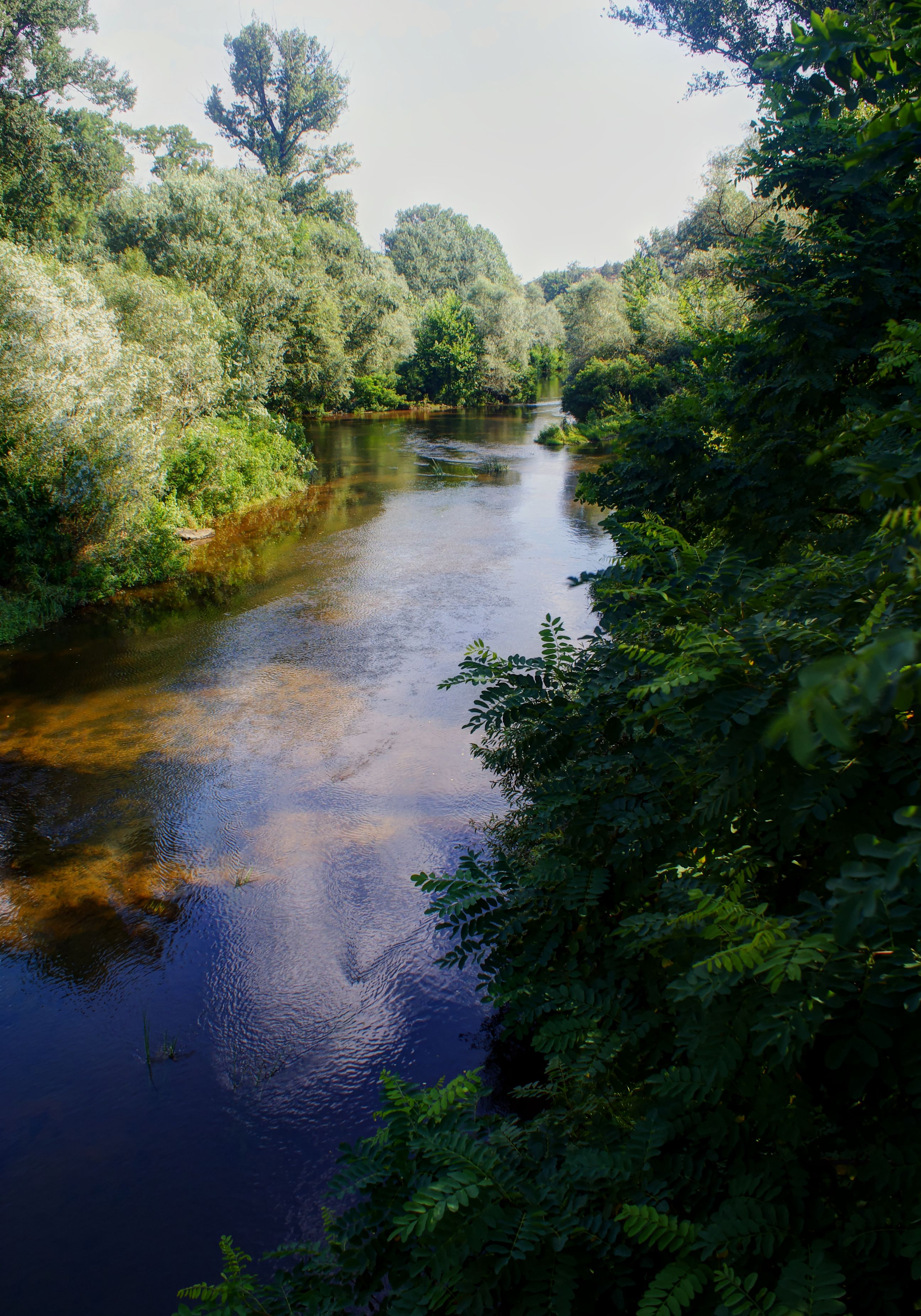

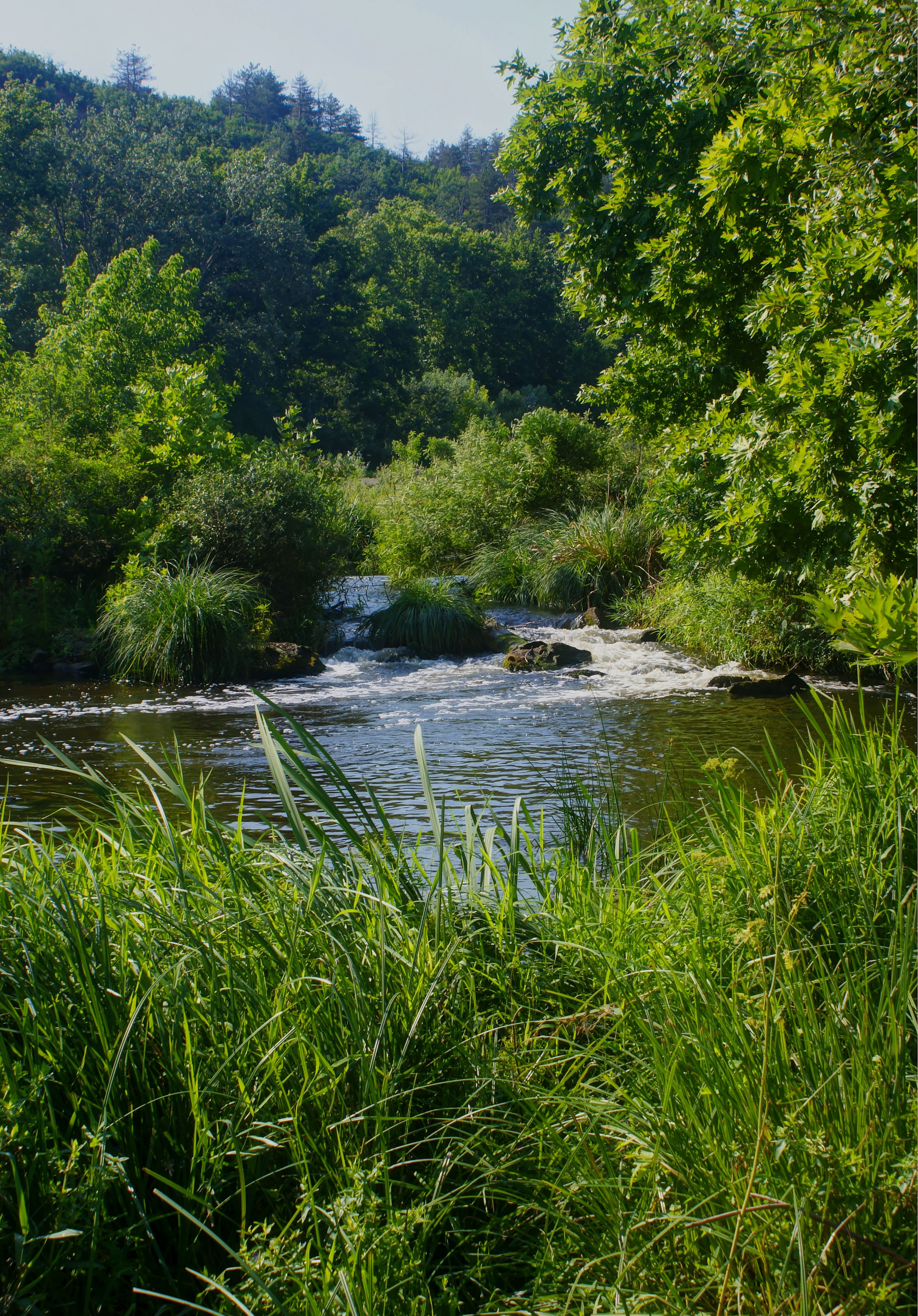

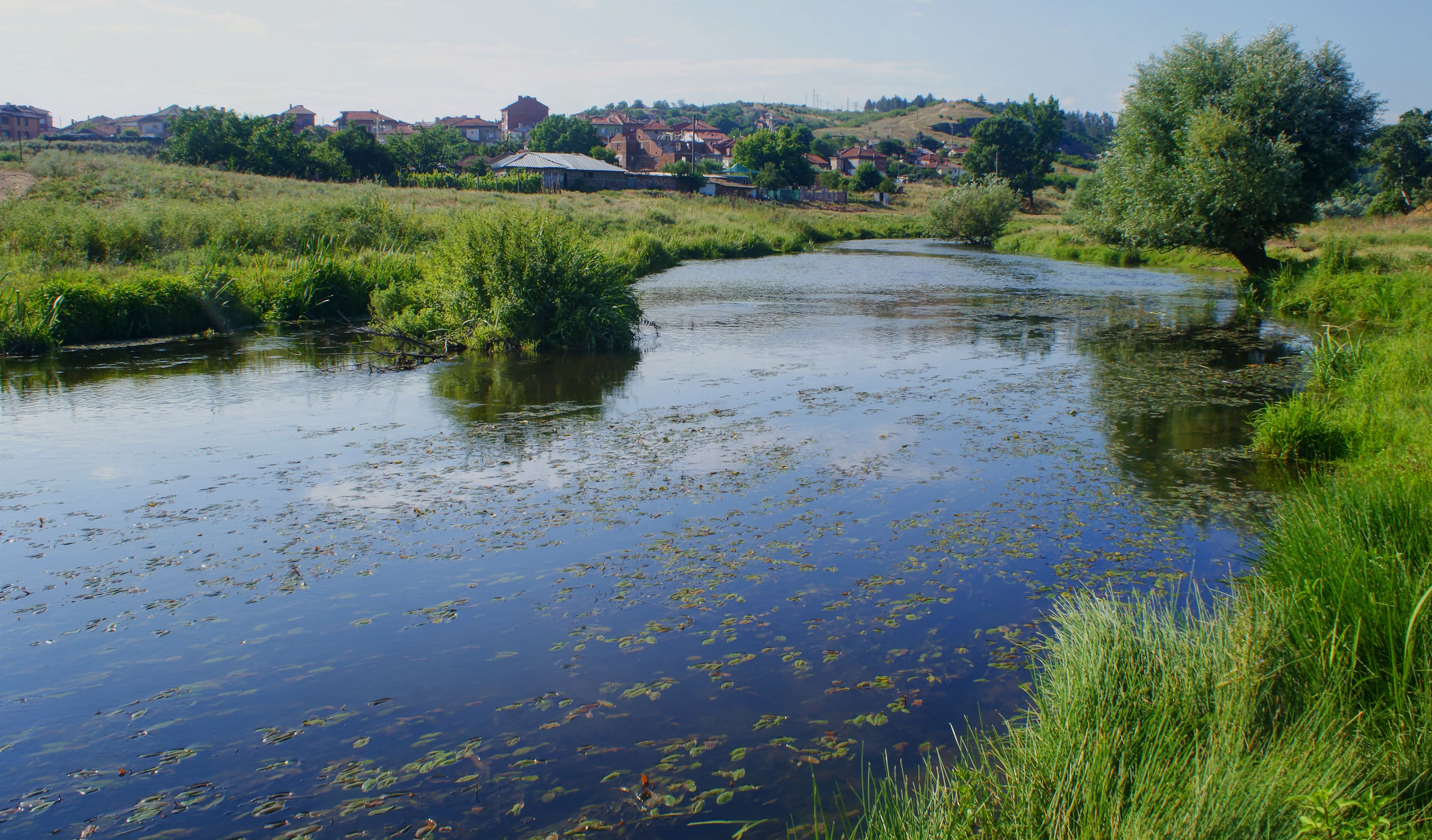

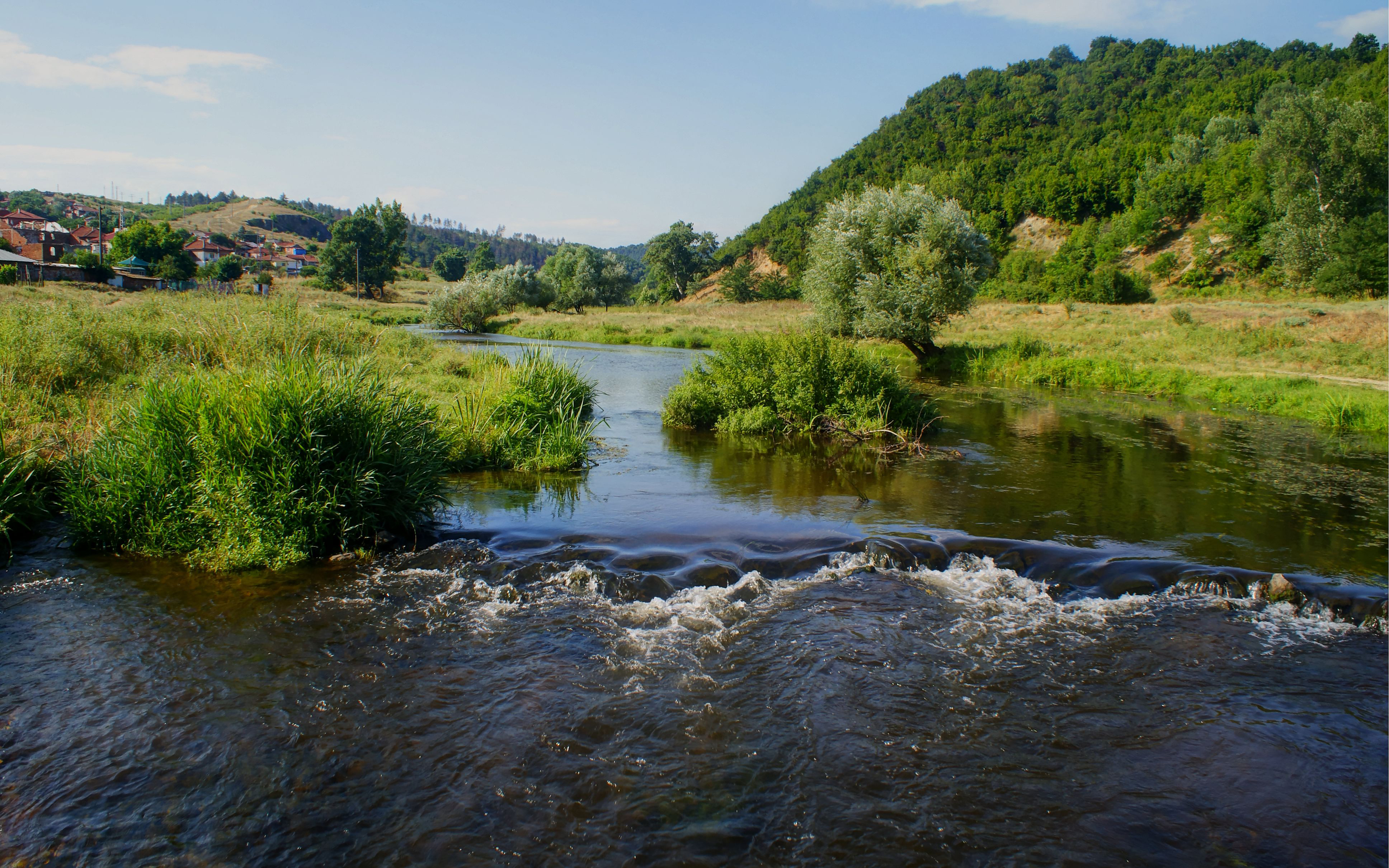
