= Borovitsa (river) =

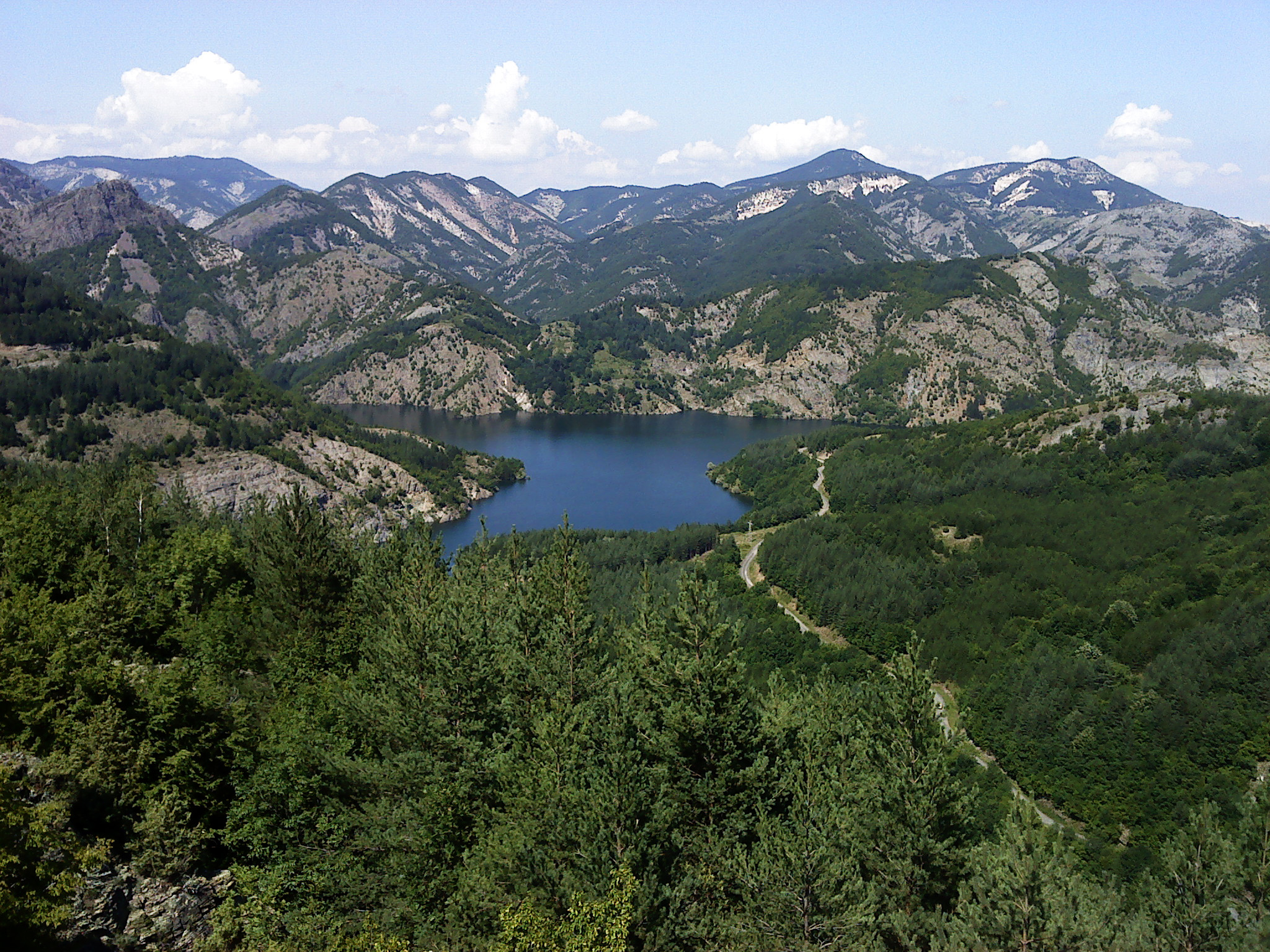
- Borovitsa Reservoir on the river

Location
- Country: Bulgaria

Physical characteristics
- Source
  - location: N of Elvarnika, Rhodope Mountains
  - coordinates: 41°44′48.12″N 24°58′32.88″E
  - elevation: 1,622 m (5,322 ft)
- Mouth
  - location: Arda→ Maritsa→ Aegean Sea
  - coordinates: 41°42′48.96″N 25°14′34.08″E
  - elevation: 332 m (1,089 ft)
- Length: 42 km (26 mi)
- Basin size: 301 km^{2} (116 sq mi)

The Borovitsa (Bulgarian: Боровица) is a 42 km long river in southern Bulgaria, a left tributary of the Arda of the Maritsa drainage. Along its low course and its tributary the Ayladere passes the boundary between the western and the eastern Rhodope Mountains.

The river takes its source under the name Hambardere at an altitude of 1,622 m on the northern foothills of the summit of Elvarnika (1,715 m) in the Pereliksko–Prespanski Ridge of the western Rhodope Mountains. It initially flows in northeastern direction, gradually turning to the southeast and forming a large arc bulging to the north. Its valley is deep and sparsely forested. The river flows into the northern arm of the Kardzhali Reservoir on the Arda at an altitude of 332 m. It drains the northeastern slopes of the Pereliksko–Prespanski Ridge and the westernmost parts of the Gorata Ridge.

Its drainage basin covers a territory of 301 km^{2}, or 5.19% of the Arda's total. The river has predominantly rain–snow feed. The average annual flow at its mouth is 5 m^{3}/s.

The Borovitsa flows in Smolyan, Plovdiv and Kardzhali Provinces. There are three villages along its course, all of them in Kardzhali Province — Bezvodno and Voynovo in Chernoochene Municipality, and Nenkovo in Kardzhali Municipality. Along its course is situated the Borovitsa Reservoir which provides potable water for the town of Kardzhali.

Near its confluence with the Arda at the modern Kardzhali Reservoir are located the ruins of the medieval Patmos Fortress.
