= II-58 road (Bulgaria) =

Road in Bulgaria

Republic Road I-58
- Републикански път I-58

Route information
- Length: 60.8 km (37.8 mi)

Major junctions
- From: Km 326.5 of I-5, near Chernoochene
- To: Km 27.3 of II-86, Asenovgrad

Location
- Country: Bulgaria
- Towns: Asenovgrad

Highway system
- Highways in Bulgaria

Republican Road II-58 (Bulgarian: Републикански път II-58) is a 2nd class road in Bulgaria, running in general direction southeast–northwest through the territory of Kardzhali and Plovdiv Provinces. Its length is 60.8 km.

== Route description ==
The road starts at Km 326.5 of the first class I-5 road north of the village of Chernoochene in Kardzhali Province and heads northwest along the ridge of Chukata in the eastern Rhodope Mountains, passing through the villages of Gabrovo and Komuniga. It then reaches the Kitkata Saddle (735 m) that separates the Pereliksko–Prespanski division of the western Rhodope Mountains from the ridges of Dragoyna and Mechkovets of the eastern Rhodopes, and enters Plovdiv Province. There, the road descends along the northern slopes of the Sini Vrah ridge and at the village of Novakovo enters the southern hilly reaches of the Upper Thracian Plain. The II-53 then passes through the villages of Topolovo, Dolnoslav and Cherven and in the center of the town of Asenovgrad, intersects with the second class II-86 road.
