= I-8 road (Bulgaria) =

Road in Bulgaria

Republic Road I-8
- Републикански път I-8
- I-8 road highlighted in orange

Route information
- Length: 386.1 km (239.9 mi)

Major junctions
- From: Kalotina; (Serbia)
- To: Kapitan Andreevo; (Turkey)

Location
- Country: Bulgaria
- Major cities: Slivnitsa, Sofia, Kostenets, Septemvri, Pazardzhik, Plovdiv, Haskovo, Harmanli, Svilengrad

Highway system
- Highways in Bulgaria

Republican road I-8 (Bulgarian: Републикански път I-8) is a first class road in southern Bulgaria. It runs between Kalotina, at the border with Serbia, and the Kapitan Andreevo border crossing to Turkey. The total length of the road is 386.1 km (239.9 mi). Most of it provides one driving lane per direction. Road I-8 follows European route E80 in its entire length, as well as E85 in the section between Haskovo and Kapitan Andreevo. It follows the route of the ancient Roman road Via Militaris. The I-8 runs in parallel to the motorways of Europe (A6), Trakiya (A1) and Maritsa (A4). The road passes through the provinces of Sofia, Sofia City, Pazardzhik, Plovdiv and Haskovo.

== Description ==
Road I-8 begins from the Kalotina checkpoint at the border with Serbia and heads southeast, bypassing the towns of Dragoman. It enters the Sofia Valley and bypasses the towns of Slivnitsa and Bozhurishte. Between Slivnitsa and the capital Sofia, the road runs as a 4-lane single-carriageway.

Road I-8 joins the northern arc of Sofia Ring Road for 35 km, passing successively south of the town of Novi Iskar, between the villages of Podgumer and Svetovrachene, north and east of the villages of Negovan and Chepintsi, where it turns south and then connects with the Hemus motorway, before reaching the starting point of the Trakiya motorway in the southeastern outskirts of Sofia. The road then shares 6 km with the motorway until Novi Han, where it diverges and ascends steeply to the village of Vakarel through the Sredna Gora mountain range.

From Vakarel the I-8 it descends into the valley of the river Mativir, enters the Ihtiman Valley, bypasses the town of Ihtiman from the east, crosses a low watershed at the village of Mirovo, enters the basin of the river Maritsa at the Kostenets–Dolna Banya Valley, passing through the towns of Momin Prohod and Kostenets.

Continuing along the Maritsa between the mountain ranges of Sredna Gora and Rila, the road enters Pazardzhik Province, gradually turning east, passing through the village of Momina Klisura and the town of Belovo, where it enters the westernmost part of the Upper Thracian Plain. The road then passes south of the town of Septemvri, crosses the river Chepinska reka, passes through the villages of Lozen and Zvanichevo and reaches the city of Pazardzhik. There, the road crosses the Maritsa, passing on its left bank, and continues east through the villages of Malo Konare and Govedare, where it enters Plovdiv Province.

In that region road I-8 passes south of the villages of Tsalapitsa and Kostievo, and runs through the city of Plovdiv, where it again returns on the right bank of the Maritsa. After leaving the city, the road crosses the river Chepelarska reka, passes north of Sadovo, through the village of Popovitsa village, the town of Parvomay and the village of Byala Reka and enters Haskovo Province.

In Haskovo Province the road passes successively through the villages of Varbitsa, Gorski Izvor and Klokotnitsa, leaves the Upper Thracian Plain and enters the Haskovo hilly region. After passing north of the city of Haskovo and the village of Podkrepa, it reaches the valley of the Harmanliyska reka at the village of Stoykovo and continues east along the northern edge of the valley to the junction for the village of Bryagovo. The road then briefly heads north, crosses a low watershed and north of the town of Harmanli returns to the Maritsa valley. After passing through the center of Harmanli the I-8 follows the right bank of the river, passes through the town of Lyubimets and reaches the town of Svilengrad. There the road once again crosses the Maritsa and along its left bank passes through the villages of Generalovo and Kapitan Andreevo, reaching its terminus at the checkpoint Kapitan Andreevo–Kapıkule on the Bulgaria–Turkey border.
