= Sredska =

Sredka may refer to:

- Sredska, Prizren, Kosovo
- Sredska, Kardzhali Province, Bulgaria

== See also ==
- Sredsko, Kardzhali Province, Bulgaria
