= Borovsko =

Borovsko may refer to:

- Borovsko, Bosnia and Herzegovina
- Borovsko, Kardzhali Province, Bulgaria
