= Rusalina =

- Village
- Location within Bulgaria
- Coordinates: 41.75°N 25.217°E
- Country: Bulgaria
- Province: Kardzhali Province
- Municipality: Chernoochene

Area
  - Total: 2.317 km^{2} (0.895 sq mi)

Population (2007)
  - Total: 13
- Time zone: UTC+2 (EET)
  - Summer (DST): UTC+3 (EEST)

Rusalina (Bulgarian: Русалина) is a village in Chernoochene Municipality, in Kardzhali Province, in southern-central Bulgaria. It is located 187.721 kilometres (116.644 mi) southeast of Sofia. It covers an area of 2.317 square kilometres and as of 2007 it had a population of 13 people.
