= Versko =

- Village
- Location within Bulgaria
- Coordinates: 41.717°N 25.35°E
- Country: Bulgaria
- Province: Kardzhali Province
- Municipality: Chernoochene

Area
  - Total: 1.205 km^{2} (0.465 sq mi)

Population (2007)
  - Total: 39
- Time zone: UTC+2 (EET)
  - Summer (DST): UTC+3 (EEST)

Versko (Bulgarian: Верско) is a village in Chernoochene Municipality, in Kardzhali Province, in southern-central Bulgaria. It is located 198.935 kilometres (123.612 mi) southeast of Sofia. It covers an area of 1.205 square kilometres and as of 2007 it had a population of 39 people.
