= Pryaporets, Kardzhali Province =

Pryaporets
- Village
- Location within Bulgaria
- Coordinates: 41.75°N 25.36667°E
- Country: Bulgaria
- Province: Kardzhali Province
- Municipality: Chernoochene

Area
  - Total: 1.373 km^{2} (0.530 sq mi)

Population (2007)
  - Total: 182
- Time zone: UTC+2 (EET)
  - Summer (DST): UTC+3 (EEST)

Pryaporets (Bulgarian: Пряпорец) is a village in Chernoochene Municipality, in Kardzhali Province, in southern-central Bulgaria. It is located 198.109 kilometres (123.099 mi) southeast of Sofia. It covers an area of 1.373 square kilometres and as of 2007 it had a population of 182 people.
