= Bostantsi =

- Village
- Location within Bulgaria
- Coordinates: 41.75°N 25.38333°E
- Country: Bulgaria
- Province: Kardzhali Province
- Municipality: Chernoochene

Area
  - Total: 1.16 km^{2} (0.45 sq mi)

Population (2007)
  - Total: 90
- Time zone: UTC+2 (EET)
  - Summer (DST): UTC+3 (EEST)

Bostantsi (Bulgarian: Бостанци) is a village in Chernoochene Municipality, in Kardzhali Province, in southern-central Bulgaria. It is located 199.279 kilometres (123.826 mi) southeast of Sofia. It covers an area of 1.16 square kilometres and as of 2007 it had a population of 90 people.
