= Daskalovo =

- Village
- Location within Bulgaria
- Coordinates: 41.783°N 25.283°E
- Country: Bulgaria
- Province: Kardzhali Province
- Municipality: Chernoochene

Area
  - Total: 4.986 km^{2} (1.925 sq mi)

Population (2007)
  - Total: 382
- Time zone: UTC+2 (EET)
  - Summer (DST): UTC+3 (EEST)

Daskalovo (Bulgarian: Даскалово) is a village in Chernoochene Municipality, in Kardzhali Province, in southern-central Bulgaria. It is located 190.284 kilometres (118.237 mi) southeast of Sofia. It covers an area of 4.986 square kilometres and as of 2007 it had a population of 382 people.
