= Kanyak =

- Village
- Location within Bulgaria
- Coordinates: 41.75°N 25.283°E
- Country: Bulgaria
- Province: Kardzhali Province
- Municipality: Chernoochene

Area
  - Total: 5.697 km^{2} (2.200 sq mi)

Population (2007)
  - Total: 205
- Time zone: UTC+2 (EET)
  - Summer (DST): UTC+3 (EEST)

Kanyak (Bulgarian: Каняк) is a village in Chernoochene Municipality, in Kardzhali Province, in southern-central Bulgaria. It is located 192.274 kilometres (119.474 mi) southeast of Sofia. It covers an area of 5.697 square kilometres and as of 2007 it had a population of 205 people.
