= Petelovo =

- Village
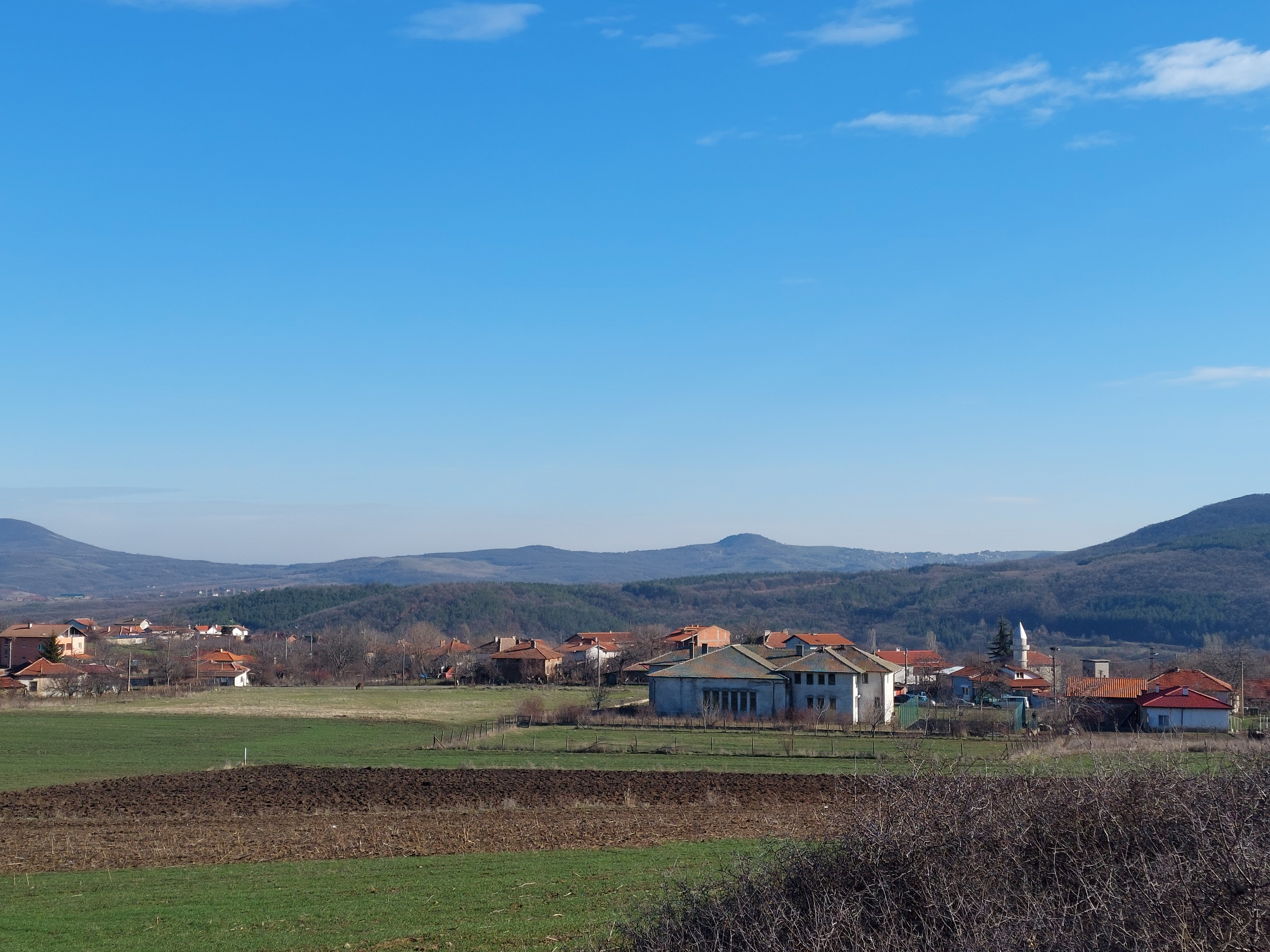
- Petelovo in December 2024

- Location within Bulgaria
- Coordinates: 41.817°N 25.367°E
- Country: Bulgaria
- Province: Kardzhali Province
- Municipality: Chernoochene

Area
  - Total: 7.276 km^{2} (2.809 sq mi)

Population (2007)
  - Total: 280
- Time zone: UTC+2 (EET)
  - Summer (DST): UTC+3 (EEST)

Petelovo (Bulgarian: Петелово) is a village in Chernoochene Municipality, in Kardzhali Province, in southern-central Bulgaria. It is located 194.259 kilometres (120.707 mi) southeast of Sofia. It covers an area of 7.276 square kilometres and as of 2007 it had a population of 280 people.
