= Sokolite =

- Village
- Location within Bulgaria
- Coordinates: 41.783°N 25.167°E
- Country: Bulgaria
- Province: Kardzhali Province
- Municipality: Chernoochene

Area
  - Total: 17.947 km^{2} (6.929 sq mi)

Population (2024)
  - Total: 40
- Time zone: UTC+2 (EET)
  - Summer (DST): UTC+3 (EEST)

Sokolite

Sokolite sunset

Sokolite (Bulgarian: Соколите) is a village in Chernoochene Municipality, in Kardzhali Province, in southern-central Bulgaria. It is located 182.231 kilometres (113.233 mi) southeast of Sofia. It covers an area of 17.947 square kilometres and as of 2007 it had a population of 81 people.
