= Pchelarovo =

Pchelarovo may refer to the following places in Bulgaria:

- Pchelarovo, Dobrich Province
- Pchelarovo, Kardzhali Province
