= Yonchovo =

- Village
- Location within Bulgaria
- Coordinates: 41.85°N 25.2°E
- Country: Bulgaria
- Province: Kardzhali Province
- Municipality: Chernoochene

Area
  - Total: 12.497 km^{2} (4.825 sq mi)

Population (2007)
  - Total: 162
- Time zone: UTC+2 (EET)
  - Summer (DST): UTC+3 (EEST)

Yonchovo (Bulgarian: Йончово) is a village in Chernoochene Municipality, in Kardzhali Province, in southern-central Bulgaria. It is located 180.506 kilometres (112.161 mi) southeast of Sofia. It covers an area of 12.497 square kilometres and as of 2007 it had a population of 162 people.
