= Vozhdovo =

- Village
- Location within Bulgaria
- Coordinates: 41°45′N 25°22′E
- Country: Bulgaria
- Province: Kardzhali Province
- Municipality: Chernoochene

Area
  - Total: 0.821 km^{2} (0.317 sq mi)

Population (2024)
  - Total: 64
- Time zone: UTC+2 (EET)
  - Summer (DST): UTC+3 (EEST)

Vozhdovo (Bulgarian: Вождово Turkish: Emiroğullar) is a village in Chernoochene Municipality, in Kardzhali Province, in southern-central Bulgaria. It covers an area of 0.821 square kilometres and as of 2007 it had a population of 85 people. Most people are Turkish and the main profession is Islam.
