= Bosilitsa =

- Village
- Location within Bulgaria
- Coordinates: 41.75°N 25.23333°E
- Country: Bulgaria
- Province: Kardzhali Province
- Municipality: Chernoochene

Population (2007)
  - Total: 15
- Time zone: UTC+2 (EET)
  - Summer (DST): UTC+3 (EEST)

Bosilitsa (Bulgarian: Босилица) is a village in Chernoochene Municipality, in Kardzhali Province, in southern-central Bulgaria. It is located 188.843 kilometres (117.342 mi) southeast of Sofia. It covers an area of square kilometres and as of 2007 it had a population of 15 people.
