= Besnurka =

- Village
- Location within Bulgaria
- Coordinates: 41.767°N 25.25°E
- Country: Bulgaria
- Province: Kardzhali Province
- Municipality: Chernoochene

Area
  - Total: 2.715 km^{2} (1.048 sq mi)

Population (2007)
  - Total: 4
- Time zone: UTC+2 (EET)
  - Summer (DST): UTC+3 (EEST)

Besnurka (Bulgarian: Беснурка) is a village in Chernoochene Municipality, in Kardzhali Province, in southern-central Bulgaria. It is located 188.949 kilometres (117.407 mi) southeast of Sofia. It covers an area of 2.715 square kilometres and as of 2007 it had a population of 4 people.
