= Zheleznik =

Zheleznik (Bulgarian: Железник) may refer to:

- Zheleznik, Burgas Province, a village
- Zheleznik, Kardzhali Province, a village
- Zheleznik, Stara Zagora, a city neighbourhood

== See also ==
- Železnik (disambiguation)
