= Zhitnitsa =

Zhitnitsa (Bulgarian pronunciation: [ˈʒitnit͡sɐ], lit. 'granary') may refer to the following villages of Bulgaria:

- Zhitnitsa, Dobrich Province
- Zhitnitsa, Kardzhali Province
- Zhitnitsa, Plovdiv Province
- Zhitnitsa, Varna Province, in Provadia Municipality
