= Panichkovo =

- Village
- Location within Bulgaria
- Coordinates: 41.833°N 25.167°E
- Country: Bulgaria
- Province: Kardzhali Province
- Municipality: Chernoochene

Area
  - Total: 9.772 km^{2} (3.773 sq mi)

Population (2007)
  - Total: 394
- Time zone: UTC+2 (EET)
  - Summer (DST): UTC+3 (EEST)

Panichkovo (Bulgarian: Паничково) is a village in Chernoochene Municipality, in Kardzhali Province, in southern-central Bulgaria. It is located 179.188 kilometres (111.342 mi) southeast of Sofia. It covers an area of 9.772 square kilometres and as of 2007 it had a population of 394 people.
