= Beli Vir =

- Village
- Location within Bulgaria
- Coordinates: 41.733°N 25.3°E
- Country: Bulgaria
- Province: Kardzhali Province
- Municipality: Chernoochene

Area
  - Total: 8.067 km^{2} (3.115 sq mi)

Population (2007)
  - Total: 485
- Time zone: UTC+2 (EET)
  - Summer (DST): UTC+3 (EEST)

Beli Vir (Bulgarian: Бели вир) is a village in Chernoochene Municipality, in Kardzhali Province, in southern-central Bulgaria. It is located 194.493 kilometres (120.852 mi) southeast of Sofia. It covers an area of 8.067 square kilometres and as of 2007 it had a population of 485 people.

== Landmarks ==
The Kardzhali Dam is located around 15 km from Beli Vir. This large dam is a popular place for summer activities like swimming, water sports, and fishing.

Another important site is the Perperikon complex. This medieval site, thought to have been a sanctuary for the god Dionysus, is included in Bulgaria's top 100 tourist spots.
