= Novi Pazar, Kardzhali Province =

Novi Pazar
- Village
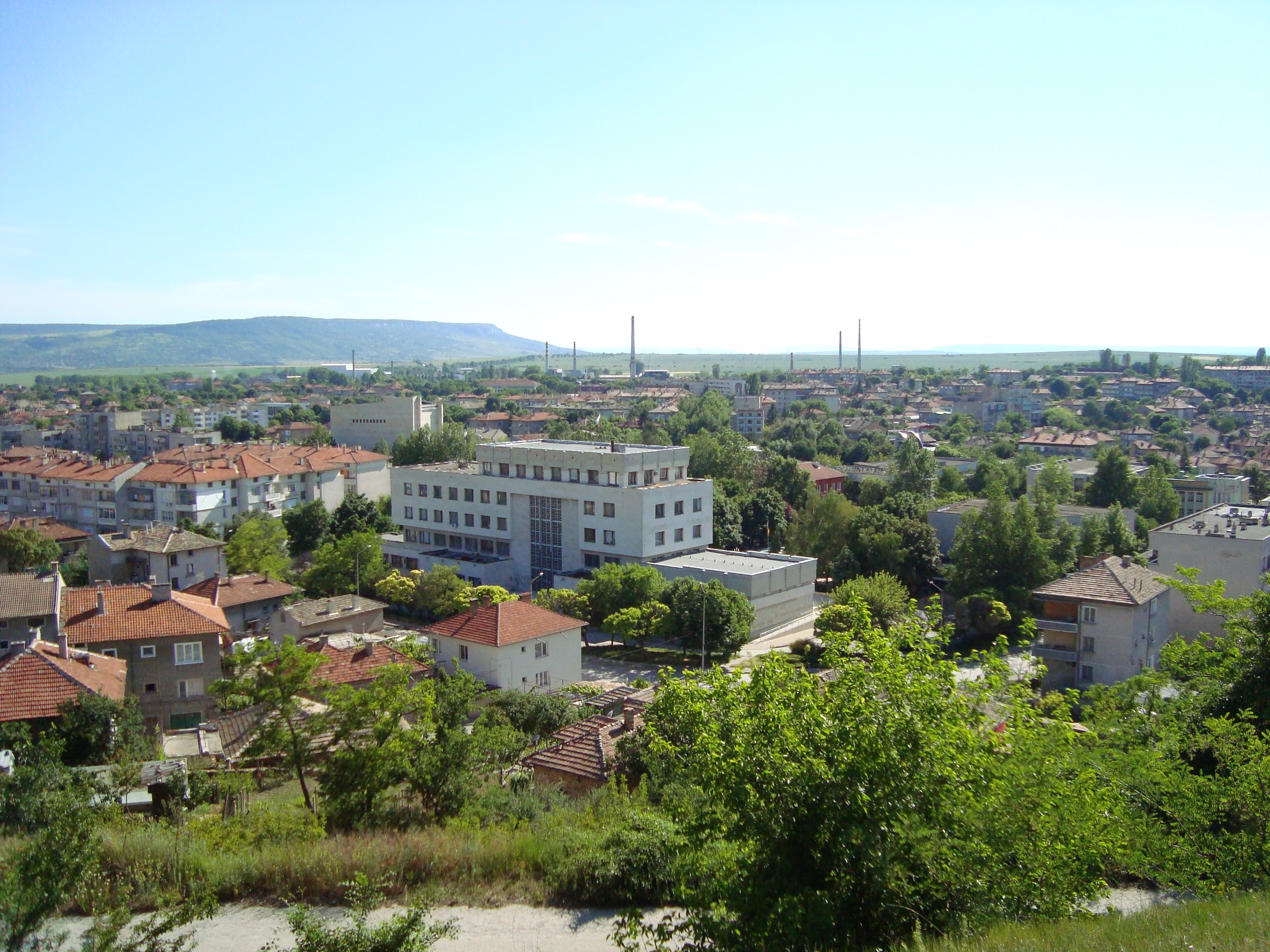
- Novi Pazar in 2009

- Location within Bulgaria
- Coordinates: 41.75°N 25.35°E
- Country: Bulgaria
- Province: Kardzhali Province
- Municipality: Chernoochene

Population (2007)
  - Total: 190
- Time zone: UTC+2 (EET)
  - Summer (DST): UTC+3 (EEST)

Novi Pazar (Bulgarian: Нови пазар) is a village in Chernoochene Municipality, in Kardzhali Province, in southern-central Bulgaria. It is located 196.941 kilometres (122.373 mi) southeast of Sofia. As of 2007 it had a population of 190 people.
