= Nebeska =

- Village
- Location within Bulgaria
- Coordinates: 41.767°N 25.183°E
- Country: Bulgaria
- Province: Kardzhali Province
- Municipality: Chernoochene

Area
  - Total: 5.099 km^{2} (1.969 sq mi)

Population (2007)
  - Total: 24
- Time zone: UTC+2 (EET)
  - Summer (DST): UTC+3 (EEST)

Nebeska (Bulgarian: Небеска) is a village in Chernoochene Municipality, in Kardzhali Province, in southern-central Bulgaria. It is located 184.327 kilometres (114.535 mi) southeast of Sofia. It covers an area of 5.099 square kilometres (1.969 sq mi) kilometres and as of 2007 it had a population of 24 people.
