= Kableshkovo =

Kableshkovo may refer to:

== Bulgaria ==
- Kableshkovo, Dobrich Province, village
- Kableshkovo, Kardzhali Province, village
- Kableshkovo, Pomorie Municipality, town

== Greece ==
- Kableshkovo, Bulgarian name of Thourio, Evros
