= Kopitnik =

- Village
- Location within Bulgaria
- Coordinates: 41.783°N 25.17°E
- Country: Bulgaria
- Province: Kardzhali Province
- Municipality: Chernoochene

Population (2007)
  - Total: 5
- Time zone: UTC+2 (EET)
  - Summer (DST): UTC+3 (EEST)

Kopitnik (Bulgarian: Копитник) is a village in Chernoochene Municipality, in Kardzhali Province, in southern-central Bulgaria. It is located 185.685 kilometres (115.379 mi) southeast of Sofia. As of 2007 it had a population of 5 people.
