= Dushka (village) =

- Village
- Location within Bulgaria
- Coordinates: 41°54′N 25°12′E
- Country: Bulgaria
- Province: Kardzhali Province
- Municipality: Chernoochene

Population (31 December 2016)
  - Total: ▼3
- Time zone: UTC+2 (EET)
  - Summer (DST): UTC+3 (EEST)

Dushka (Bulgarian: Душка) is a village in Chernoochene Municipality, in Kardzhali Province, in southern-central Bulgaria.

As of 2016 it had a population of only 3 people: two men and one female.
