= Patitsa =

- Village
- Location within Bulgaria
- Coordinates: 41.73333°N 25.36667°E
- Country: Bulgaria
- Province: Kardzhali Province
- Municipality: Chernoochene

Area
  - Total: 4.136 km^{2} (1.597 sq mi)

Population (2007)
  - Total: 170
- Time zone: UTC+2 (EET)
  - Summer (DST): UTC+3 (EEST)

Patitsa (Bulgarian: Патица) is a village in Chernoochene Municipality, in Kardzhali Province, in southern-central Bulgaria. It is located 199.105 kilometres (123.718 mi) southeast of Sofia. It covers an area of 4.136 square kilometres and as of 2007 it had a population of 170 people.
