= Yabalcheni =

- Village
- Location within Bulgaria
- Coordinates: 41.767°N 25.35°E
- Country: Bulgaria
- Province: Kardzhali Province
- Municipality: Chernoochene

Area
  - Total: 3.219 km^{2} (1.243 sq mi)

Population (2024)
  - Total: 116
- Time zone: UTC+2 (EET)
  - Summer (DST): UTC+3 (EEST)

Yabalcheni (Bulgarian: Ябълчени) is a village in Chernoochene Municipality, in Kardzhali Province, in southern-central Bulgaria. It is located 195.933 kilometres (121.747 mi) southeast of Sofia. It covers an area of 3.219 square kilometres and as of 2007 it had a population of 149 people.
