= Strazhnitsa =

- Village
- Location within Bulgaria
- Coordinates: 41°43′N 25°21′E
- Country: Bulgaria
- Province: Kardzhali Province
- Municipality: Chernoochene

Area
  - Total: 2.155 km^{2} (0.832 sq mi)

Population (2007)
  - Total: 183
- Time zone: UTC+2 (EET)
  - Summer (DST): UTC+3 (EEST)

Strazhnitsa (Bulgarian: Стражница) is a village in Chernoochene Municipality, in Kardzhali Province, in southern-central Bulgaria. It covers an area of 2.155 square kilometres and as of 2007 it had a population of 183 people.
