= Bozhurtsi =

Coordinates: 41°46′N 25°21′E

- Village
- Interactive map of Bozhurtsi
- Country: Bulgaria
- Province: Kardzhali Province
- Municipality: Chernoochene

Area
  - Total: 2.106 km^{2} (0.813 sq mi)

Population (2007)
  - Total: 258
- Time zone: UTC+2 (EET)
  - Summer (DST): UTC+3 (EEST)

Bozhurtsi (Bulgarian: Божурци [boˈʒurt͡si]) is a village in Chernoochene Municipality, in Kardzhali Province, in southern-central Bulgaria. It covers an area of 2.106 square kilometres and as of 2007 it had a population of 258 people.

== Landmarks ==
The Kardzhali Dam, located nearby and is a popular place for summer activities like swimming, water sports, and fishing.

Another important site is the Perperikon complex. This medieval site, located 19km South East, is thought to have been a sanctuary for the god Dionysus, and is included in Bulgaria's top 100 tourist spots.
