= Barza Reka =

- Village
- Location within Bulgaria
- Coordinates: 41.733°N 25.383°E
- Country: Bulgaria
- Province: Kardzhali Province
- Municipality: Chernoochene

Area
  - Total: 3.516 km^{2} (1.358 sq mi)

Population (2007)
  - Total: 44
- Time zone: UTC+2 (EET)
  - Summer (DST): UTC+3 (EEST)

Barza Reka (Bulgarian: Бърза река) is a village in Chernoochene Municipality, in Kardzhali Province, in southern-central Bulgaria. It is located 200.266 kilometres (124.440 mi) southeast of Sofia. It covers an area of 3.516 square kilometres and as of 2007 it had a population of 44 people.
