= Yavorovo, Kardzhali Province =

Yavorovo
- Village
- Location within Bulgaria
- Coordinates: 41.75°N 25.283°E
- Country: Bulgaria
- Province: Kardzhali Province
- Municipality: Chernoochene

Area
  - Total: 4.402 km^{2} (1.700 sq mi)

Population (2007)
  - Total: 158
- Time zone: UTC+2 (EET)
  - Summer (DST): UTC+3 (EEST)

Yavorovo (Bulgarian: Яворово) is a village in Chernoochene Municipality, in Kardzhali Province, in southern-central Bulgaria. It is located 192.274 kilometres (119.474 mi) southeast of Sofia. It covers an area of 4.402 square kilometres and as of 2007 it had a population of 158 people.
