= Cherna Niva =

- Village
- Location within Bulgaria
- Coordinates: 41.783°N 25.267°E
- Country: Bulgaria
- Province: Kardzhali Province
- Municipality: Chernoochene

Area
  - Total: 4.437 km^{2} (1.713 sq mi)

Population (2007)
  - Total: 130
- Time zone: UTC+2 (EET)
  - Summer (DST): UTC+3 (EEST)

Cherna Niva (Bulgarian: Черна нива) is a village in Chernoochene Municipality, in Kardzhali Province, in southern-central Bulgaria. It is located 189.165 kilometres (117.542 mi) southeast of Sofia. It covers an area of 4.437 square kilometres and as of 2007 it had a population of 130 people.
