= Lyaskovo, Kardzhali Province =

Lyaskovo
- Village
- Location within Bulgaria
- Coordinates: 41.8°N 25.317°E
- Country: Bulgaria
- Province: Kardzhali Province
- Municipality: Chernoochene

Area
  - Total: 5.668 km^{2} (2.188 sq mi)

Population (2007)
  - Total: 646
- Time zone: UTC+2 (EET)
  - Summer (DST): UTC+3 (EEST)

Lyaskovo (Bulgarian: Лясково) is a village in Chernoochene Municipality, in Kardzhali Province, in southern-central Bulgaria. It is located 191.676 kilometres (119.102 mi) southeast of Sofia. It covers an area of 5.668 square kilometres and as of 2007 it had a population of 646 people.
