= Murga, Bulgaria =

Murga
- Village
- Location within Bulgaria
- Coordinates: 41.817°N 25.133°E
- Country: Bulgaria
- Province: Kardzhali Province
- Municipality: Chernoochene

Area
  - Total: 16.194 km^{2} (6.253 sq mi)

Population (2024)
  - Total: 21
- Time zone: UTC+2 (EET)
  - Summer (DST): UTC+3 (EEST)

Murga (Bulgarian: Мурга) is a village in Chernoochene Municipality, in Kardzhali Province, in southern-central Bulgaria. It is located 177.79 kilometres (110.47 mi) southeast of Sofia. It covers an area of 16.194 square kilometres and as of 2007 it had a population of 53 people.
