= Srednevo =

- Village
- Location within Bulgaria
- Coordinates: 41.767°N 25.367°E
- Country: Bulgaria
- Province: Kardzhali Province
- Municipality: Chernoochene

Area
  - Total: 2.044 km^{2} (0.789 sq mi)

Population (2007)
  - Total: 213
- Time zone: UTC+2 (EET)
  - Summer (DST): UTC+3 (EEST)

Srednevo (Bulgarian: Среднево) is a village in Chernoochene Municipality, in Kardzhali Province, in southern-central Bulgaria. It is located 197.13 kilometres (122.49 mi) southeast of Sofia. It covers an area of 2.044 square kilometres and as of 2007 it had a population of 213 people.
