= Bedrovo =

- Village
- Location within Bulgaria
- Coordinates: 41.75°N 25.367°E
- Country: Bulgaria
- Province: Kardzhali Province
- Municipality: Chernoochene
- Time zone: UTC+2 (EET)
  - Summer (DST): UTC+3 (EEST)

Bedrovo (Bulgarian: Бедрово) is a village in Chernoochene Municipality, in Kardzhali Province, in southern-central Bulgaria. It is located 198.133 kilometres (123.114 mi) southeast of Sofia.

== Landmarks ==
In Pchelarovo there is a church dedicated to St. Paraskeva, commonly known as St. Petka with a bell tower with a six-sided dome supported by circular columns. The church is active and is recognized as a cultural monument.

The Ethnographic Museum in Pchelarovo showcases traditional items such as costumes and tools, providing insight into local cultural heritage.
