= Bakalite =

- Village
- Location within Bulgaria
- Coordinates: 41.733°N 25.233°E
- Country: Bulgaria
- Province: Kardzhali Province
- Municipality: Chernoochene

Area
  - Total: 6.385 km^{2} (2.465 sq mi)

Population (2024)
  - Total: 67
- Time zone: UTC+2 (EET)
  - Summer (DST): UTC+3 (EEST)

Bakalite (Bulgarian: Бакалите) is a village in Chernoochene Municipality, in Kardzhali Province, in southern-central Bulgaria. It is located 189.883 kilometres (117.988 mi) southeast of Sofia. It covers an area of 6.385 square kilometres and as of 2007 it had a population of 89 people.

== Landmarks ==
The Perperikon complex is significant site in the region. It is an ancient archaeological location, believed to have been a Thracian temple, and is included in Bulgaria’s list of prominent tourist destinations.

The Kardzhali dam is located nearby and is used for various activities such as swimming, fishing, and water sports during the summer. Approximately 2 km northeast of Bakalite village, on a hill, is the Fishek Kaya fortress, which is accessible to visitors.
