= Bezvodno =

- Village
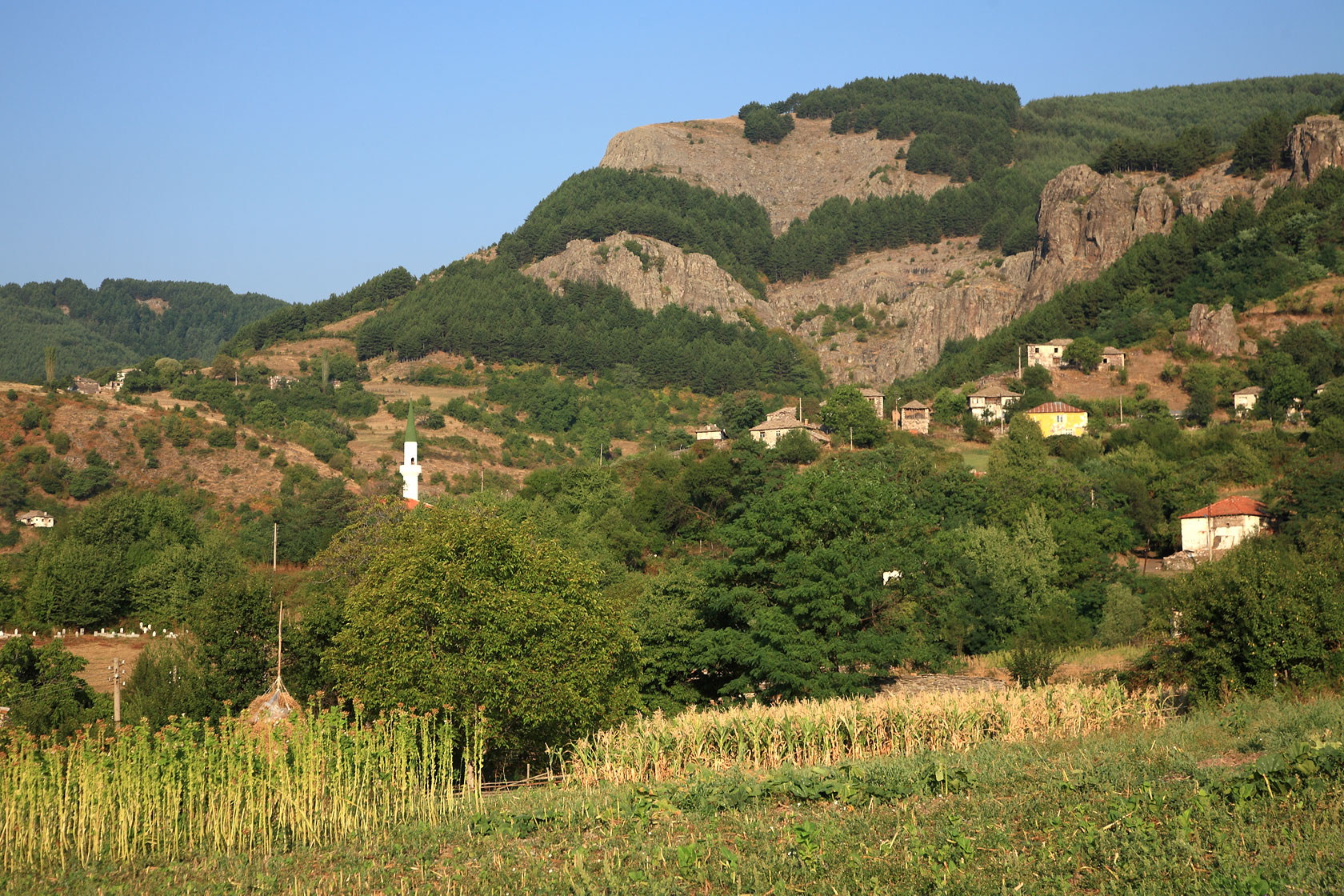

- Location within Bulgaria
- Coordinates: 41.75°N 25.1°E
- Country: Bulgaria
- Province: Kardzhali Province
- Municipality: Chernoochene

Area
  - Total: 47.474 km^{2} (18.330 sq mi)

Population (2024)
  - Total: 29
- Time zone: UTC+2 (EET)
  - Summer (DST): UTC+3 (EEST)

Bezvodno (Bulgarian: Безводно) is a village in Chernoochene Municipality, in Kardzhali Province, in southern-central Bulgaria. It is located 179.771 kilometres (111.705 mi) southeast of the capital Sofia. It covers an area of 47.474 square kilometres and as of 2007 it had a population of 134 people. The village lies in the eastern Rhodope Mountains on the river Borovitsa.

== Landmarks ==
The Kardzhali Dam is situated around 30 km from the village. It is one of the largest dams in the country and is used for various activities, including water sports, and fishing, especially during the summer months.

Approximately 57 km from Bezvodno, the Perperikon complex is another significant site. This ancient site is believed to have served as a Thracian temple dedicated to Dionysus and is listed among Bulgaria's top 100 tourist locations.
