= Zhenda =

Zhenda, Bulgaria Женда
- Village
- Location within Bulgaria
- Coordinates: 41.7667°N 25.1833°E
- Country: Bulgaria
- Province: Kardzhali Province
- Municipality: Chernoochene

Population (2024)
  - Total: 28
- Time zone: UTC+2 (EET)
  - Summer (DST): UTC+3 (EEST)

Near Zhenda4

Near Zhenda3

Near Zhenda2

Near Zhenda1

Near Zhenda

Zhenda

Zhenda is a village in Chernoochene Municipality, Kardzhali Province, southern Bulgaria.
