= Svobodinovo =

- Village
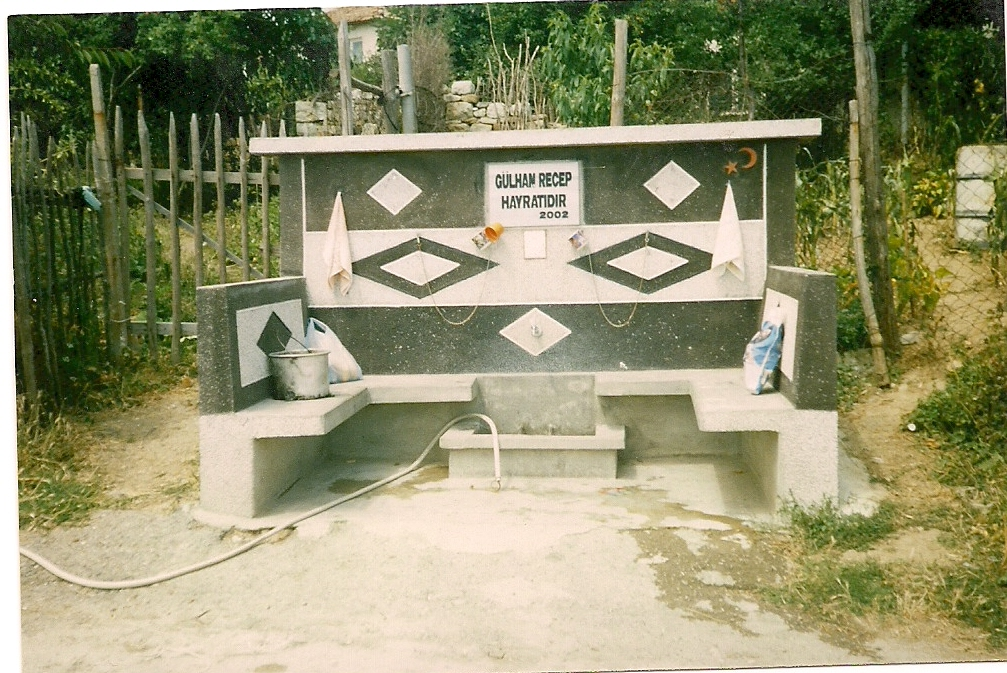
- 6706 Svobodinovo, Bulgaria

- Location within Bulgaria
- Coordinates: 41.717°N 25.333°E
- Country: Bulgaria
- Province: Kardzhali Province
- Municipality: Chernoochene

Area
  - Total: 4.937 km^{2} (1.906 sq mi)

Population (2007)
  - Total: 187
- Time zone: UTC+2 (EET)
  - Summer (DST): UTC+3 (EEST)

Svobodinovo (Bulgarian: Свободиново) is a village in Chernoochene Municipality, in Kardzhali Province, in southern-central Bulgaria. It is located 197.758 kilometres (122.881 mi) southeast of Sofia. It covers an area of 4.937 square kilometres and as of 2007 it had a population of 187 people.
