= Minzuhar =

- Village
- Location within Bulgaria
- Coordinates: 41.76667°N 25.4°E
- Country: Bulgaria
- Province: Kardzhali Province
- Municipality: Chernoochene

Area
  - Total: 8.581 km^{2} (3.313 sq mi)

Population (2007)
  - Total: 470
- Time zone: UTC+2 (EET)
  - Summer (DST): UTC+3 (EEST)

Minzuhar (Bulgarian: Минзухар) is a village in Chernoochene Municipality, in Kardzhali Province, in southern-central Bulgaria. It is located 199.48 kilometres (123.95 mi) southeast of Sofia. It covers an area of 8.581 square kilometres and as of 2007 it had a population of 470 people.
