= Dyadovsko =

- Village
- Location within Bulgaria
- Coordinates: 41.767°N 25.3°E
- Country: Bulgaria
- Province: Kardzhali Province
- Municipality: Chernoochene

Area
  - Total: 4.947 km^{2} (1.910 sq mi)

Population (2007)
  - Total: 399
- Time zone: UTC+2 (EET)
  - Summer (DST): UTC+3 (EEST)

Dyadovsko (Bulgarian: Дядовско) is a village in Chernoochene Municipality, in Kardzhali Province, in southern-central Bulgaria. It is located 192.429 kilometres (119.570 mi) southeast of Sofia. It covers an area of 4.947 square kilometres and as of 2007 it had a population of 399 people.
