= Novoselishte =

- Village
- Location within Bulgaria
- Coordinates: 41.783°N 25.25°E
- Country: Bulgaria
- Province: Kardzhali Province
- Municipality: Chernoochene

Area
  - Total: 2.537 km^{2} (0.980 sq mi)

Population (2007)
  - Total: 98
- Time zone: UTC+2 (EET)
  - Summer (DST): UTC+3 (EEST)

Novoselishte (Bulgarian: Новоселище) is a village in Chernoochene Municipality, in Kardzhali Province, in southern-central Bulgaria. It is located 187.979 kilometres (116.805 mi) southeast of Sofia. It covers an area of 2.537 square kilometres and as of 2007 it had a population of 98 people.The etymology of the village comes from Slavic languages meaning new village, Novo Selo.
