= Vazel =

- Village
- Location in Bulgaria
- Coordinates: 41.706°N 25.353°E
- Country: Bulgaria
- Province: Kardzhali Province
- Municipality: Chernoochene

Area
  - Total: 0.661 km^{2} (0.255 sq mi)

Population (2007)
  - Total: 88
- Time zone: UTC+2 (EET)
  - Summer (DST): UTC+3 (EEST)

Vazel (Bulgarian: Възел) is a village in Chernoochene Municipality, in Kardzhali Province, in southern-central Bulgaria. It covers an area of 0.661 square kilometres and as of 2007 it had a population of 88 people.
