= Kutsovo =

- Village
- Location within Bulgaria
- Coordinates: 41.76667°N 25.21667°E
- Country: Bulgaria
- Province: Kardzhali Province
- Municipality: Chernoochene

Area
  - Total: 3.74 km^{2} (1.44 sq mi)

Population (2007)
  - Total: 12
- Time zone: UTC+2 (EET)
  - Summer (DST): UTC+3 (EEST)

Kutsovo (Bulgarian: Куцово) is a village in Chernoochene Municipality, in Kardzhali Province, in southern-central Bulgaria. It is located 186.664 kilometres (115.988 mi) southeast of Sofia. It covers an area of 3.74 square kilometres and as of 2007 it had a population of 12 people.
