= Draganovo =

Draganovo may refer to:

- In Bulgaria (written in Cyrillic as Драганово):
  - Draganovo, Burgas Province - a village in the Burgas municipality, Burgas Province
  - Draganovo, Dobrich Province - a village in the Dobrich municipality, Dobrich Province
  - Draganovo, Kardzhali Province - a village in the Chernoochene municipality, Kardzhali Province
  - Draganovo, Veliko Tarnovo Province - a village in the Gorna Oryahovitsa municipality, Veliko Tarnovo Province
