= Zheleznik, Kardzhali Province =

Zheleznik Железник
- Village
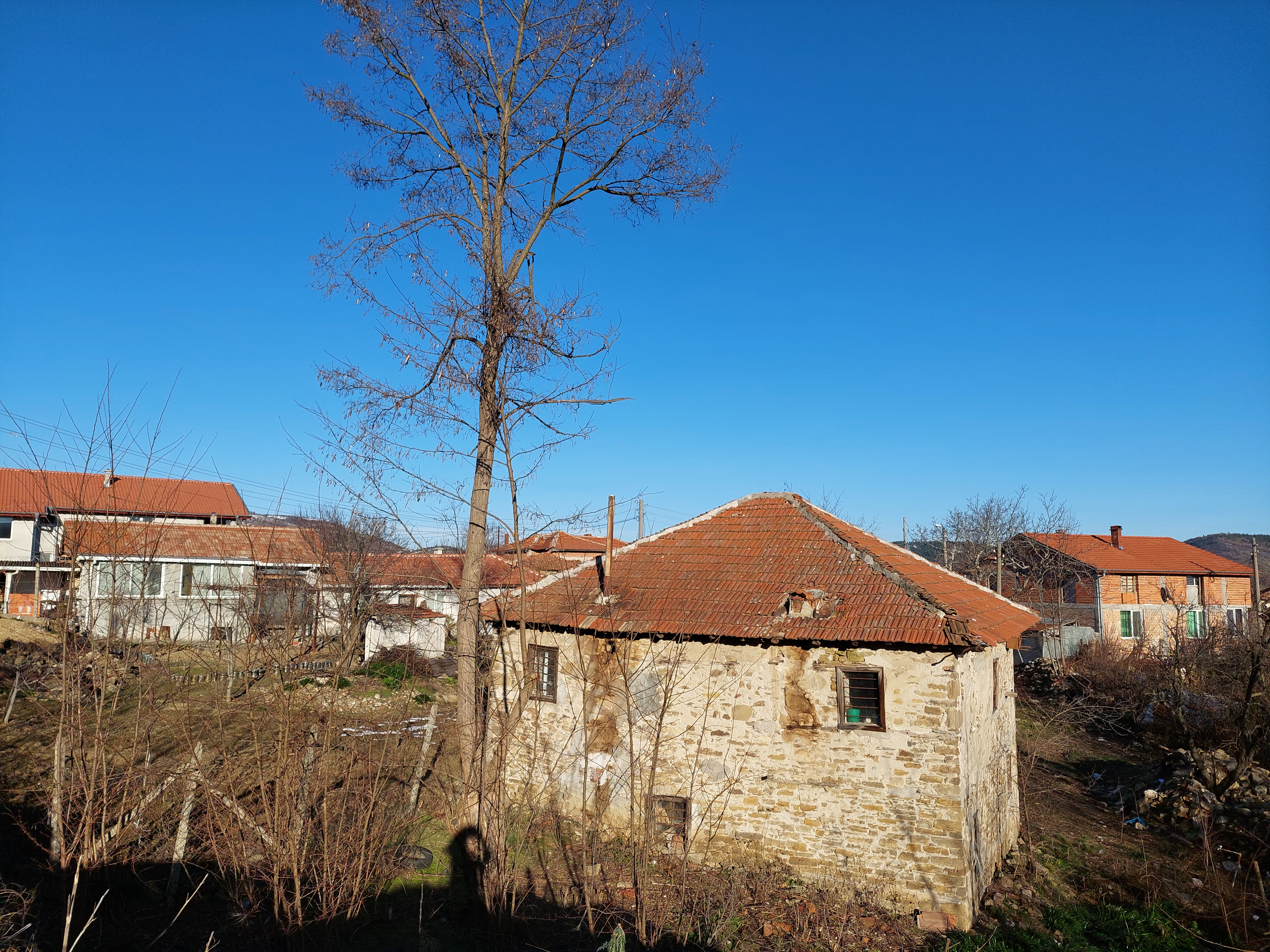
- Zheleznik in 2021

- Location within Bulgaria
- Coordinates: 41.7500°N 25.3500°E
- Country: Bulgaria
- Province: Kardzhali Province
- Municipality: Chernoochene

Population (31-12-2016)
  - Total: ▼243
- Time zone: UTC+2 (EET)
  - Summer (DST): UTC+3 (EEST)

Zheleznik is a village in Chernoochene Municipality, Kardzhali Province, southern Bulgaria.

All inhabitants are ethnic Turks.
