= Nochevo =

- Village
- Location within Bulgaria
- Coordinates: 41.883°N 25.2°E
- Country: Bulgaria
- Province: Kardzhali Province
- Municipality: Chernoochene

Area
  - Total: 12.911 km^{2} (4.985 sq mi)

Population (2007)
  - Total: 95
- Time zone: UTC+2 (EET)
  - Summer (DST): UTC+3 (EEST)

Nochevo (Bulgarian: Ночево) is a village in Chernoochene Municipality, in Kardzhali Province, in southern-central Bulgaria. It is located 178.616 kilometres (110.987 mi) southeast of Sofia. It covers an area of 12.911 square kilometres and as of 2007 it had a population of 95 people.
