= Gabrovo, Kardzhali Province =

Gabrovo
- Village
- Location within Bulgaria
- Coordinates: 41.8°N 25.67°E
- Country: Bulgaria
- Province: Kardzhali Province
- Municipality: Chernoochene

Area
  - Total: 12.777 km^{2} (4.933 sq mi)

Population (2007)
  - Total: 744
- Time zone: UTC+2 (EET)
  - Summer (DST): UTC+3 (EEST)

Gabrovo (Bulgarian: Габрово) is a village in Chernoochene Municipality, in Kardzhali Province, in southern-central Bulgaria. It is located 188.153 kilometres (116.913 mi) southeast of Sofia. It covers an area of 12.777 square kilometres and as of 2007 it had a population of 744 people.
