= Kableshkovo, Kardzhali Province =

Kableshkovo
- Village
- Location within Bulgaria
- Coordinates: 41.767°N 25.35°E
- Country: Bulgaria
- Province: Kardzhali Province
- Municipality: Chernoochene

Area
  - Total: 1.24 km^{2} (0.48 sq mi)

Population (2007)
  - Total: 191
- Time zone: UTC+2 (EET)
  - Summer (DST): UTC+3 (EEST)

Kableshkovo (Bulgarian: Каблешково) is a village in Chernoochene Municipality, in Kardzhali Province, in southern-central Bulgaria. It is located 195.933 kilometres (121.747 mi) southeast of Sofia. It covers an area of 1.24 square kilometres and as of 2007 it had a population of 191 people.
