= Železnik (disambiguation) =

Železnik is an urban neighborhood of Belgrade, Serbia.

Železnik (Serbian and Macedonian: Железник) may also refer to:

- FK Železnik, a football club in Železnik
- Železnik Hall, a sports venue in Železnik
- Železnik (region) (Demir Hisar (region)), a region in North Macedonia

== See also ==
- Zheleznik (disambiguation)
