= Nenkovo =

Nenkovo Ненково
- Village
- Location within Bulgaria
- Coordinates: 41.7333°N 25.1667°E
- Country: Bulgaria
- Province: Kardzhali Province
- Municipality: Kardzhali

Population (31st of December 2017)
  - Total: ▼115
- Time zone: UTC+2 (EET)
  - Summer (DST): UTC+3 (EEST)

Nenkovo is a village situated in Kardzhali Municipality, Kardzhali Province, southern Bulgaria.

== Population ==
According to the 2011 Bulgaria Population And Housing Census, the village of Nenkovo has 129 inhabitants, down from its peak of 883 people shortly after the Second World War. The village is exclusively inhabited by ethnic Bulgarian Turks (99%).
