= Zhitnitsa, Kardzhali Province =

Zhitnitsa Житница
- Village
- Location within Bulgaria
- Coordinates: 41.7500°N 25.3167°E
- Country: Bulgaria
- Province: Kardzhali Province
- Municipality: Chernoochene
- Time zone: UTC+2 (EET)
  - Summer (DST): UTC+3 (EEST)

Zhitnitsa is a village in Chernoochene Municipality, Kardzhali Province, southern Bulgaria.
