= Voynovo, Kardzhali Province =

Voynovo
- Village
- Location within Bulgaria
- Coordinates: 41.75°N 25.183°E
- Country: Bulgaria
- Province: Kardzhali Province
- Municipality: Chernoochene

Area
  - Total: 2.133 km^{2} (0.824 sq mi)

Population (2024)
  - Total: 7
- Time zone: UTC+2 (EET)
  - Summer (DST): UTC+3 (EEST)

Voynovo (Bulgarian: Войново) is a village in Chernoochene Municipality, in Kardzhali Province, in southern-central Bulgaria. It is located 185.395 kilometres (115.199 mi) southeast of Sofia. It covers an area of 2.133 square kilometres and as of 2007 it had a population of 13 people.
