= Borovsko, Kardzhali Province =

Borovsko
- Village
- Location within Bulgaria
- Coordinates: 41.733°N 25.233°E
- Country: Bulgaria
- Province: Kardzhali Province
- Municipality: Chernoochene

Area
  - Total: 4.021 km^{2} (1.553 sq mi)

Population (2007)
  - Total: 19
- Time zone: UTC+2 (EET)
  - Summer (DST): UTC+3 (EEST)

Borovsko (Bulgarian: Боровско) is a village in Chernoochene Municipality, in Kardzhali Province, in southern-central Bulgaria. It is located 189.883 kilometres (117.988 mi) southeast of Sofia. It covers an area of 4.021 square kilometres and as of 2007 it had a population of 19 people.
