= Sredska, Kardzhali Province =

Sredska
- Village
- Location within Bulgaria
- Coordinates: 41.783°N 25.2°E
- Country: Bulgaria
- Province: Kardzhali Province
- Municipality: Chernoochene

Area
  - Total: 2.92 km^{2} (1.13 sq mi)

Population (2007)
  - Total: 23
- Time zone: UTC+2 (EET)
  - Summer (DST): UTC+3 (EEST)

Sredska (Bulgarian: Средска) is a village in Chernoochene Municipality, in Kardzhali Province, in southern-central Bulgaria. It is located 184.507 kilometres (114.647 mi) southeast of Sofia. It covers an area of 2.92 square kilometres and as of 2007 it had a population of 23 people.
