= Komuniga =

- Village
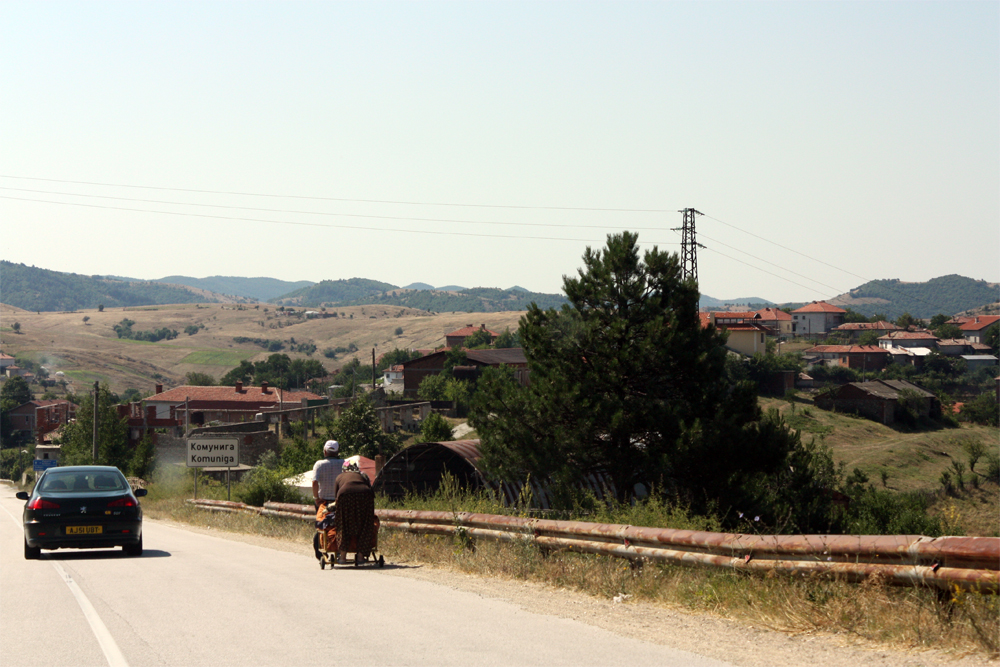
- View from a road towards Komuniga

- Location within Bulgaria
- Coordinates: 41.8°N 25.233°E
- Country: Bulgaria
- Province: Kardzhali Province
- Municipality: Chernoochene

Area
  - Total: 26.665 km^{2} (10.295 sq mi)

Population (2007)
  - Total: 1,150
- Time zone: UTC+2 (EET)
  - Summer (DST): UTC+3 (EEST)

Komuniga (Bulgarian: Комунига) is a village in Chernoochene Municipality, in Kardzhali Province, in southern-central Bulgaria. It is located 185.772 kilometres (115.433 mi) southeast of Sofia. It covers an area of 26.665 square kilometres and as of 2007 it had a population of 1150 people.

Komuniga Island in Graham Land, Antarctica is named after the village.
