= Pchelarovo, Kardzhali Province =

Pchelarovo
- Village
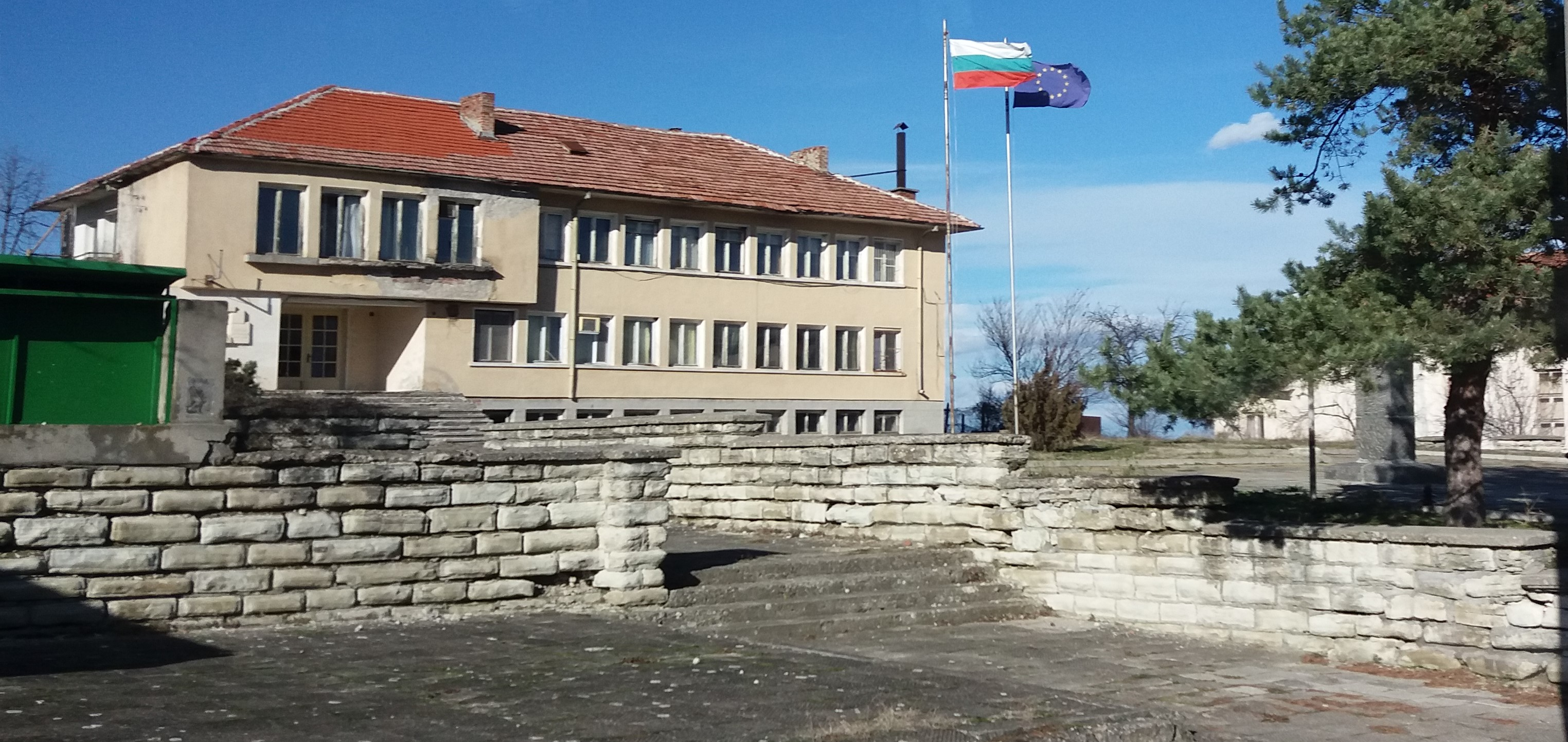

- Location within Bulgaria
- Coordinates: 41.783°N 25.367°E
- Country: Bulgaria
- Province: Kardzhali Province
- Municipality: Chernoochene

Area
  - Total: 25.645 km^{2} (9.902 sq mi)

Population (2017)
  - Total: ▼108
- Time zone: UTC+2 (EET)
  - Summer (DST): UTC+3 (EEST)

Pchelarovo (Bulgarian: Пчеларово) is a village in Chernoochene Municipality, in Kardzhali Province, in southern-central Bulgaria. It is located 196.2 kilometres (121.9 mi) southeast of Sofia. It covers an area of 25.645 square kilometres and as of 2007 it had a population of 175 people.

== Population ==
According to the census of 2011, the village of Pchelarovo has 142 inhabitants, down from its peak of 1,107 people shortly after the Second World War. The village is exclusively inhabited by ethnic Bulgarians (99%).
