= Bryagovo, Haskovo Province =

Bryagovo Брягово
- Village
- Location in Bulgaria
- Coordinates: 41.917°N 25.783°E
- Country: Bulgaria
- Province: Haskovo Province
- Municipality: Haskovo

Area
  - Total: 27.037 km^{2} (10.439 sq mi)
- Elevation: 194 m (636 ft)

Population (2021)
  - Total: 405
- Time zone: UTC+2 (EET)
  - Summer (DST): UTC+3 (EEST)

Bryagovo (Bulgarian: Брягово) is a village in Haskovo Municipality, Haskovo Province, southern Bulgaria. It was once part of the Hasköylü Ağalık (Agaluk of Haskovo).

== Geography ==
Bryagovo lies about 20 km east of Haskovo, the province and municipal seat, and about 10 km west of the town of Harmanli. It sits on the right (southern) valley slope of the Harmanliyska River (the northern slope of the low Rhodope ridge of Huhla), in the transition zone toward the Haskovo Hilly Country to the north. The climate is transitional continental, and the soils in the village's territory are predominantly smolnitzas. Elevation at the village center, by the town hall building, is about 187 m, rising to about 200 m in the south and falling to about 130–135 m in the northeast.

A short municipal road connects to the first-class Road I-8 (European route E80) running north of the river, which leads west through the villages of Stoykovo and Podkrepa to Haskovo, and east to Harmanli. The Trakia motorway (also part of E80 along this stretch), about 6 km north of Bryagovo, can be reached from either Haskovo or Harmanli.

The village's territory borders those of Polyanovo to the north, Ostar Kamak to the east, Elena to the south, Lyubenovo to the southwest, Rodopi to the west, and Konstantinovo to the northwest.

There are three small reservoirs within Bryagovo's territory.

== Population ==
Population by census year:

1934	1946	1956	1965	1975	1985	1992	2001	2011	2021
1,093	1,156	1,076	961	720	607	592	558	462	405

According to the 2011 census, the ethnic composition was:

Ethnicity	Number	%
Bulgarians	153	33.11
Turks	0	0.00
Roma	200	44.32
Other	3	0.64
Undeclared	55	11.90
Total	462	100.00

== History ==
After the Russo-Turkish War (1877–78), under the Treaty of Berlin (1878), the village — then named Tremezlii — remained part of Eastern Rumelia; it joined Bulgaria after the 1885 Unification, and was renamed Bryagovo in 1906.

The church of the Holy Ascension of Christ in Tremezlii (Bryagovo) was built in 1884.

A primary school was established in the village in 1863; a school building was constructed in 1883. Middle-school classes were opened in 1922, when the school was renamed "Cyril and Methodius" People's Primary School. Due to a sharp decline in student numbers, the school became a primary school for grades one through four in September 1971, and in 1977 it closed and became a branch of the "Hristo Botev" school in the village of Dinevo.

The village's chitalishte (community cultural center), "Nadezhda," was established in 1909, initially housed in a shop belonging to Dimo Hristev Parapana. It was registered as a non-profit legal entity by the Haskovo District Court in December 1997.

A credit cooperative, "Saznanie," was founded in the village in 1940 by 14 founding members, later opening a consumer shop and café, extending credit, and taking deposits; it moved into its own building in 1943. Between 1948–49 all commercial activity in the village was taken over by the cooperative, and in 1950 a TKZS department was opened under it. Rodopi village joined the cooperative in January 1956, and a new two-story building with cellar space was built for it in 1961. In February 1968, the cooperative merged its assets and liabilities into the "Dinya" consumer cooperative in the village of Dinevo.

== Public institutions ==
As of 2023, Bryagovo is the seat of the kmetstvo (mayoralty) of Bryagovo. The village has a registered chitalishte ("Nadezhda"), an Eastern Orthodox church (Holy Ascension of Christ), the "Mecho Puh" kindergarten, and a post office.

== Landmarks ==
Old stone houses have been preserved in Bryagovo. The village has memorial plaques for those who died in the wars of 1912–18 (the Balkan Wars and World War I) and in the final phase of Bulgaria's involvement in World War II, 1944–45. The surrounding area contains the remains of a Thracian settlement.
