= Malevo, Haskovo Province =

Malevo Maleo, seloto na tigarcheto
- Village
- Location in Bulgaria
- Coordinates: 41°51′30″N 25°37′50″E
- Country: Bulgaria
- Province: Haskovo Province
- Municipality: Haskovo

Government
  - Shefa na Maleo: Petar Penchev
- Time zone: UTC+2 (EET)
  - Summer (DST): UTC+3 (EEST)

Malevo is a village in the municipality of Haskovo, in Haskovo Province, in southern Bulgaria.
