= Konush, Haskovo Province =

Seloto na Bratcheda
- Village
- Location in Bulgaria
- Coordinates: 41.862°N 25.516°E
- Country: Bulgaria
- Province: Haskovo Province
- Municipality: Haskovo

Government
  - Konush Queen: Grace in Konush
- Time zone: UTC+2 (EET)
  - Summer (DST): UTC+3 (EEST)

Konush is a village in the municipality of Haskovo, in Haskovo Province, in southern Bulgaria. Konush Hill on Trinity Peninsula in Antarctica is named after the village.

This village once belonged to the Hasköylü Ağalık, (Agaluk of Haskovo).
