= Podkrepa (village) =

- Village
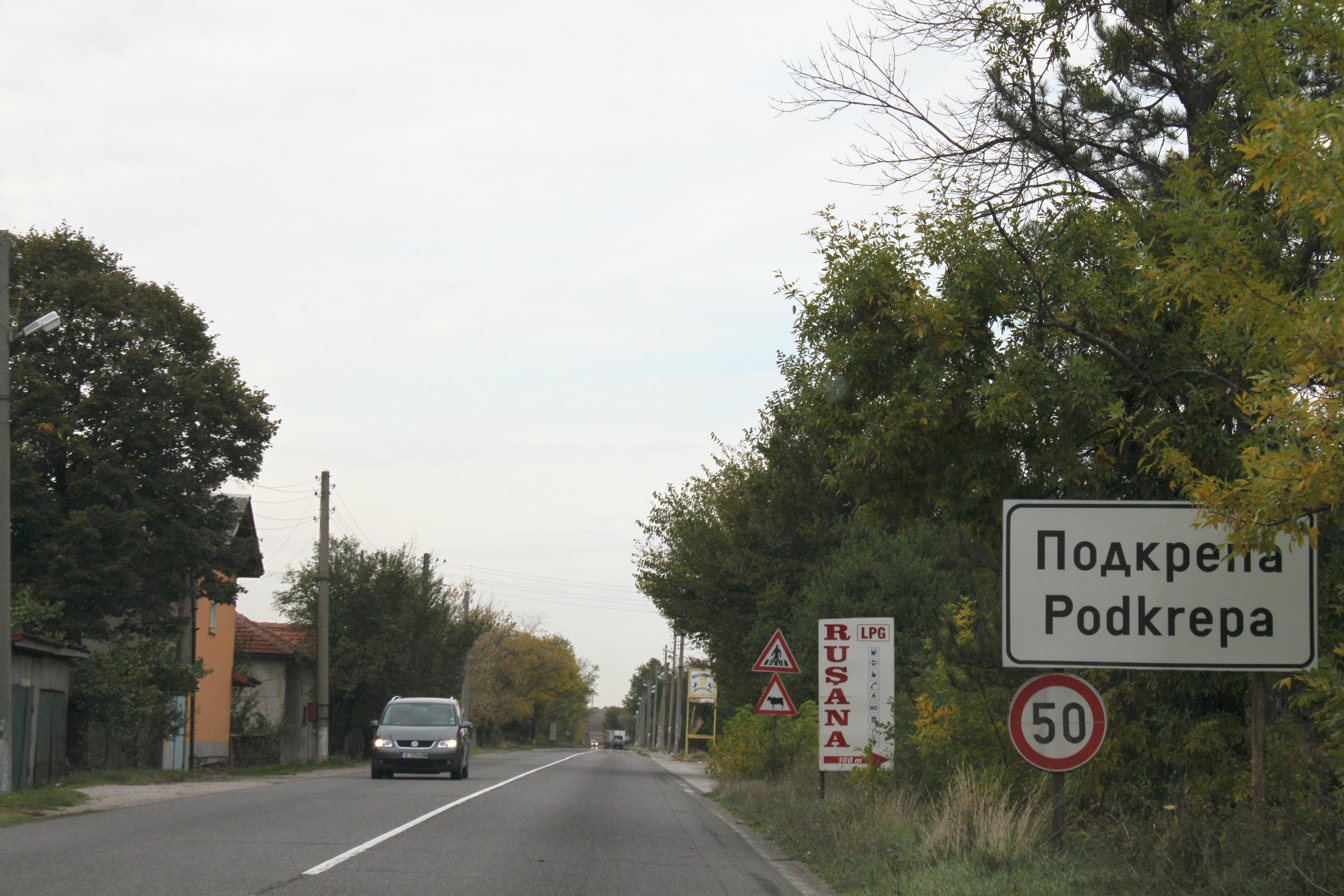
- Road sign in Podkrepa

- Location within Bulgaria
- Coordinates: 41°55′N 25°41′E
- Country: Bulgaria
- Province: Haskovo Province
- Municipality: Haskovo
- Time zone: UTC+2 (EET)
  - Summer (DST): UTC+3 (EEST)

Podkrepa (Bulgarian: Подкрепа [potˈkrɛpɐ]) is a village in the municipality of Haskovo, in Haskovo Province, southern Bulgaria.
