= Voyvodovo, Haskovo Province =

Voyvodovo
- Village
- Location in Bulgaria
- Coordinates: 41°51′25″N 25°32′45″E
- Country: Bulgaria
- Province: Haskovo Province
- Municipality: Haskovo
- Time zone: UTC+2 (EET)
  - Summer (DST): UTC+3 (EEST)

Voyvodovo (Turkish: Paşa köy) is a village in the municipality of Haskovo, in Haskovo Province, in southern Bulgaria.

== Gallery ==
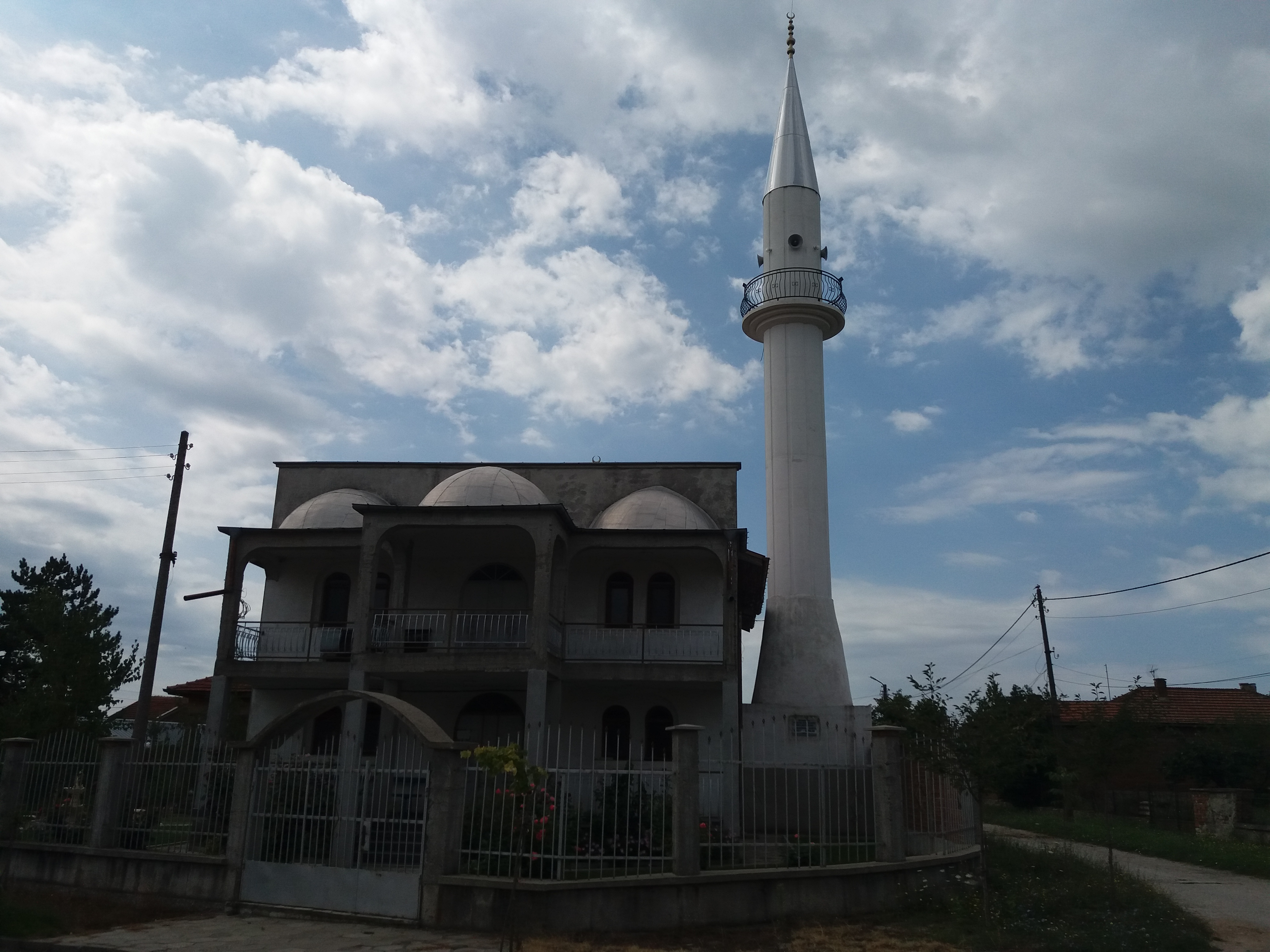

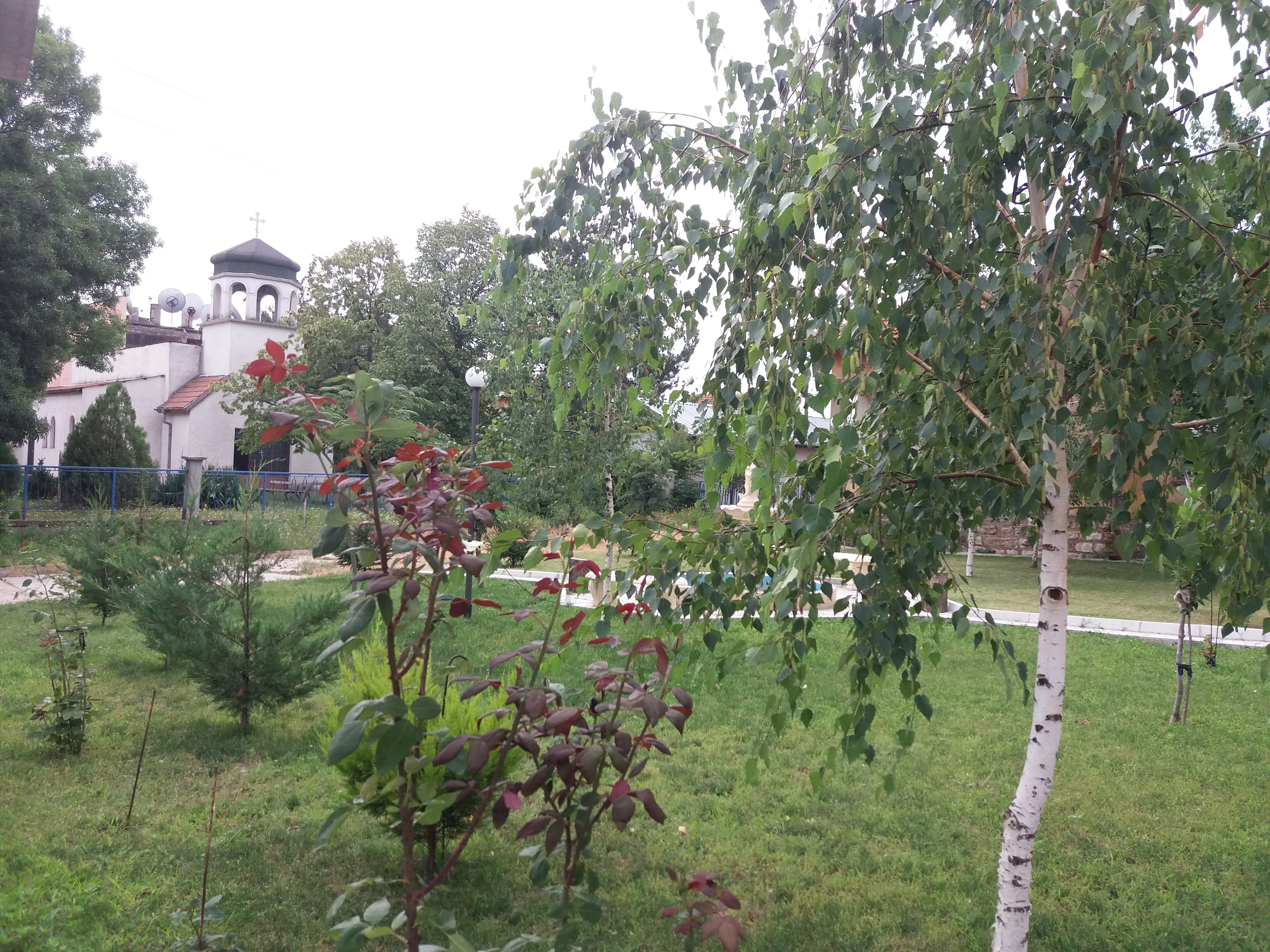
