= Chernoochene Municipality =

Chernoochene Municipality Община Черноочене
- Municipality
- Location within Bulgaria
- Coordinates: 41°46′N 25°21′E
- Country: Bulgaria
- Province: Kardzhali

Area
  - Total: 328.57 km^{2} (126.86 sq mi)

Population (31 December 2024)
  - Total: 7,647 ▼
  - Density: 23.27/km^{2} (60.28/sq mi)
- Time zone: UTC+2 (EET)
  - Summer (DST): UTC+3 (EEST)
- Website: chernoochene.com

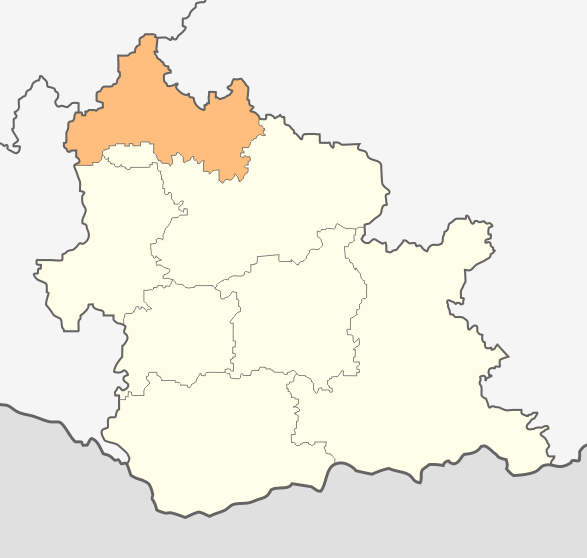
Chernoochene municipality within Kardzhali Province Cernocene Municipality is a municipality located in the Kardzhali Province of Bulgaria. Its administrative centre is the town of Cernocene.

== Demographics ==
According to the 2011 census, the municipality of Chernoochene has the highest relative share of ethnic Bulgarian Turks (97.1%), as well as Muslims (96.6%) of the total country. Chernoochene is a rural municipality, with all of its inhabitants living in one of the fifty villages. As of December 2018, the municipality of Chernoochene has 8,791 inhabitants.

=== Religion ===
According to the latest Bulgarian census of 2011, the religious composition, among those who answered the optional question on religious identification, was the following:

Religious composition of Chernoochene Municipality
Orthodox Christianity	2.2%
Catholicism	0.1%
Protestantism	0.0%
Islam	96.6%
No religion	0.1%
Prefer not to answer, others and indefinable	1.0%

Most ethnic Turks are Muslim. Most ethnic Bulgarians are Orthodox Christians, living in the village of Pchelarovo. All other villages have a Turkish and Islamic majority.
