= Kardzhali Province =

Province in southern Bulgaria

Coordinates: 41°39′N 25°22′E

Kardzhali Province Област Кърджали
- Province
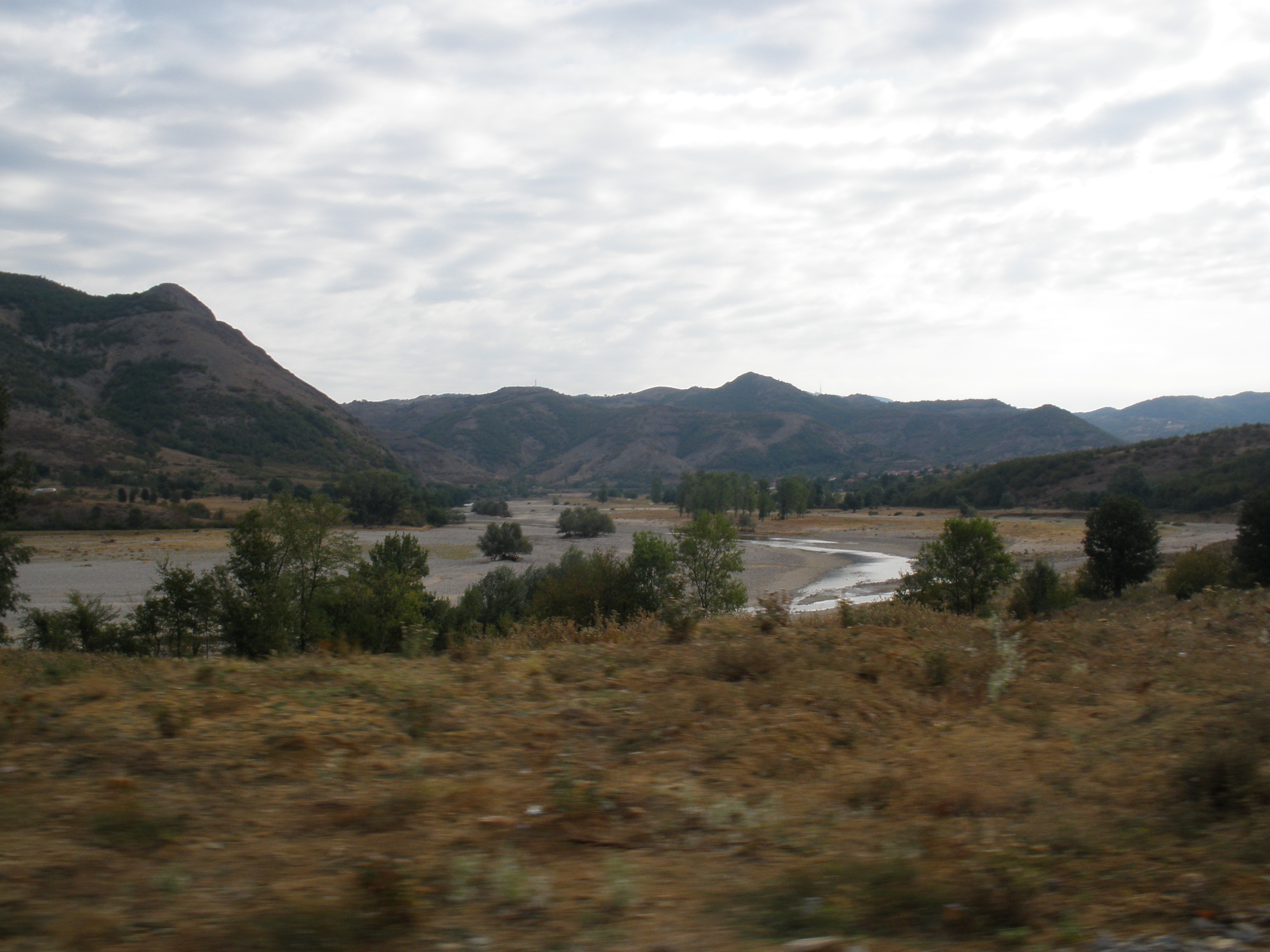
- Varbitsa River Valley

- Location of Kardzhali Province in Bulgaria
- Country: Bulgaria
- Capital: Kardzhali
- Municipalities: 7

Government
  - Governor: Nikola Chanev

Area
  - Total: 3,209 km^{2} (1,239 sq mi)

Population (December 2024)
  - Total: 149,478
  - Density: 46.58/km^{2} (120.6/sq mi)
- Time zone: UTC+2 (EET)
  - Summer (DST): UTC+3 (EEST)
- License plate: K
- Website: kardzhali.org

Kardzhali Province (Bulgarian: Област Кърджали, romanized: Oblast Kărdžali) is a province of southern Bulgaria, neighbouring Greece with the Greek regional units of Xanthi, Rhodope, and Evros to the south and east. It is 3,209.1 km^{2} in area. Its main city is Kardzhali. It is Bulgaria's southernmost province.

== History ==
The territory of Kardzhali province was acquired by Bulgaria during the First Balkan War in 1912. In 1913 the region was organized as the district (окръг, okrăg in Bulgarian) of Mestanli. This district was part of Stara Zagora province from 1934 until 1949, then it was transferred to the newly formed Haskovo district. In 1959, Kardzhali became the center of a new district with similar borders to the current province. Between 1987 and 1999, the region was part of Haskovo Province, after which it was restored, now as a province and with slightly changed borders.

== Municipalities ==
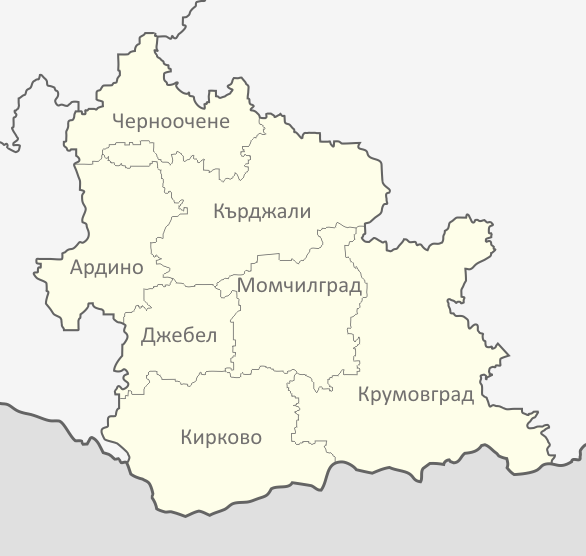
Municipalities in Kardzhali province

The Kardzhali province (област, oblast) contains seven municipalities (singular: община, obština; plural: общини, obštini). The following table shows the names of each municipality in English and Cyrillic, the main town (in bold) or village, and the population as of 2009.

Municipality	Cyrillic	Pop.	Town or village	Pop.
Ardino	Ардино	13,766	**Ardino**	4,368
Chernoochene	Черноочене	10,132	Chernoochene	335
Dzhebel	Джебел	9,012	**Dzhebel**	3,288
Kardzhali	Кърджали	75,525	**Kardzhali**	50,482
Kirkovo	Кирково	22,833	Kirkovo	719
Krumovgrad	Крумовград	20,517	**Krumovgrad**	5,475
Momchilgrad	Момчилград	19,327	**Momchilgrad**	9,187

== Demographics ==
Historical population
Year	Pop.	±%
1946	218,686	—
1956	246,761	+12.8%
1965	283,758	+15.0%
1975	273,906	−3.5%
1985	290,254	+6.0%
1992	203,251	−30.0%
2001	164,019	−19.3%
2011	152,808	−6.8%
2021	141,177	−7.6%
Source: pop-stat.mashke.org

According to the 2021 census, Kardzhali Province has a population of 141,177. According to the 2011 census, 49.8% are male and 50.2% female. Kardzhali is one of the three Bulgarian provinces where less than fifty percent of the population is living in urban areas: only 41% lives in urban areas in 2016.

=== Ethnic groups ===
Ethnic groups in Kardzhali Province (2011 census)
Ethnic group	Percentage
Turks	66.2%
Bulgarians	30.2%
others and indefinable	3.6%

Total population (2011 census): 152,808
Ethnic groups (2011 census): Identified themselves: 130,781 persons:

- Turks: 86,527 (66.16%)
- Bulgarians: 39,519 (30.22%)
- Others and indefinable: 4,735 (3.62%)

A further 22,000 persons in the province did not declare their ethnic group at the 2011 census.

In the 2001 census, 158,704 people of the population of 164,019 of Karzhali Province identified themselves as belonging to one of the following ethnic groups (with percentage of total population):

Ethnic group	Population	Percentage
Turks	101,116	61.649%
Bulgarians	55,939	34.105%
Romani	1,264	0.771%
Russians	234	0.143%
Armenians	41	0.025%
Greeks	21	0.013%
Ukrainians	20	0.012%
Macedonians	7	0.004%
Jews	1	0.001%
Romanians	1	0.001%
Other	60	0.037%

=== Language ===
In the 2021 census, 123,827 people of the population of 141,177 of Kardzhali Province identified one of the following as their mother tongue:

- 83,293 Turkish (67.3%)
- 39,062 Bulgarian (31.5%)
- 1,198 Romani (1%)
- 274 other (0.2%).

=== Religion ===
Religions in Kardzhali Province (2021 census)
Religious group	Percentage
Muslim	80.26%
Christian	17.98%
Jewish	0.02%
Others	0.02%
None	1.72%

According to the 2021 census, there are 88,705 Muslims (80.26% of those who answered) and 19,872 Christians (17.98% of those who answered) in Kardzhali. The Muslims' figure is made up of Turks and in significant part by Muslim Bulgarians, though the Orthodox are the majority among the Bulgarians in the province.

== See also ==
- Provinces of Bulgaria
- Municipalities of Bulgaria
- List of cities and towns in Bulgaria
- List of villages in Kardzhali Province
