= Dimitrovgrad Municipality, Bulgaria =

Dimitrovgrad Municipality Община Димитровград
- Municipality
- Location within Bulgaria
- Coordinates: 42°3′N 25°36′E
- Country: Bulgaria
- Province: Haskovo
- Municipality: Dimitrovgrad

Area
  - Total: 567.6 km^{2} (219.2 sq mi)

Population (1-Feb-2011)
  - Total: 53,557
  - Density: 94.36/km^{2} (244.4/sq mi)
- Time zone: UTC+2 (EET)
  - Summer (DST): UTC+3 (EEST)
- Website: www.dimitrovgrad.bg

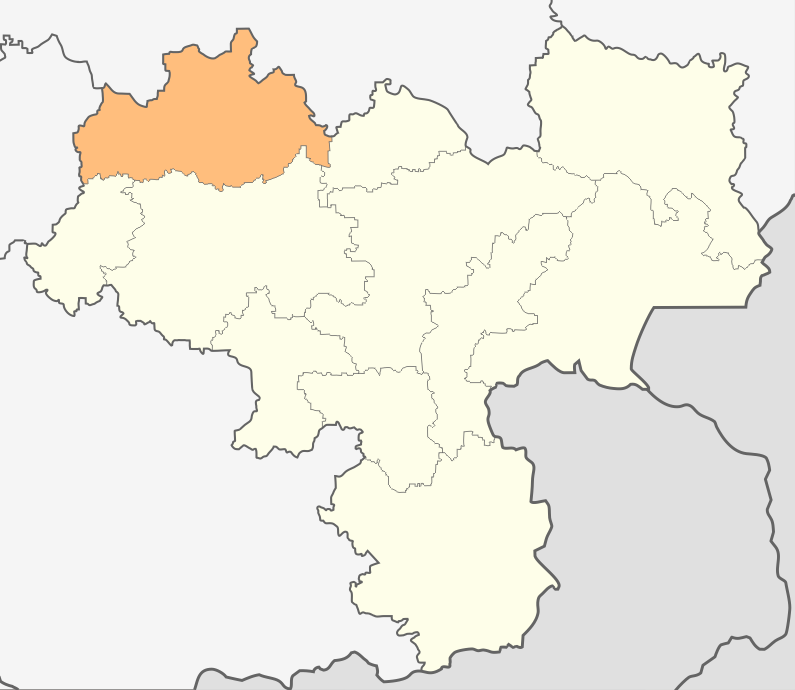
Dimitrovgrad municipality within Haskovo Province

Dimitrovgrad Municipality (Bulgarian: Община Димитровград) is a municipality in Haskovo Province, Bulgaria. The administrative centre is Dimitrovgrad.

== Settlements ==
The municipality consists of two towns (Dimitrovgrad and Merichleri) and 25 villages:

- Bodrovo
- Brod
- Bryast
- Velikan
- Voden
- Varbitsa
- Golyamo Asenovo
- Gorski Izvor
- Dimitrovgrad
- Dlagnevo
- Dobrich
- Dolno Belevo
- Zdravets
- Zlatopole
- Kasnakovo
- Krepost
- Krum
- Malko Asenovo
- Merichleri
- Radievo
- Raynovo
- Svetlina
- Skobelevo
- Stalevo
- Stransko
- Chernogorovo
- Yabalkovo

== Demography ==
=== Religion ===
According to the latest Bulgarian census of 2011, the religious composition, among those who answered the optional question on religious identification, was the following:

Religious composition of Dimitrovgrad Municipality
Orthodox Christianity	88.5%
Catholicism	0.4%
Protestantism	1.0%
Islam	1.2%
No religion	3.9%
Prefer not to answer, others and indefinable	5.0%
