= Banska =

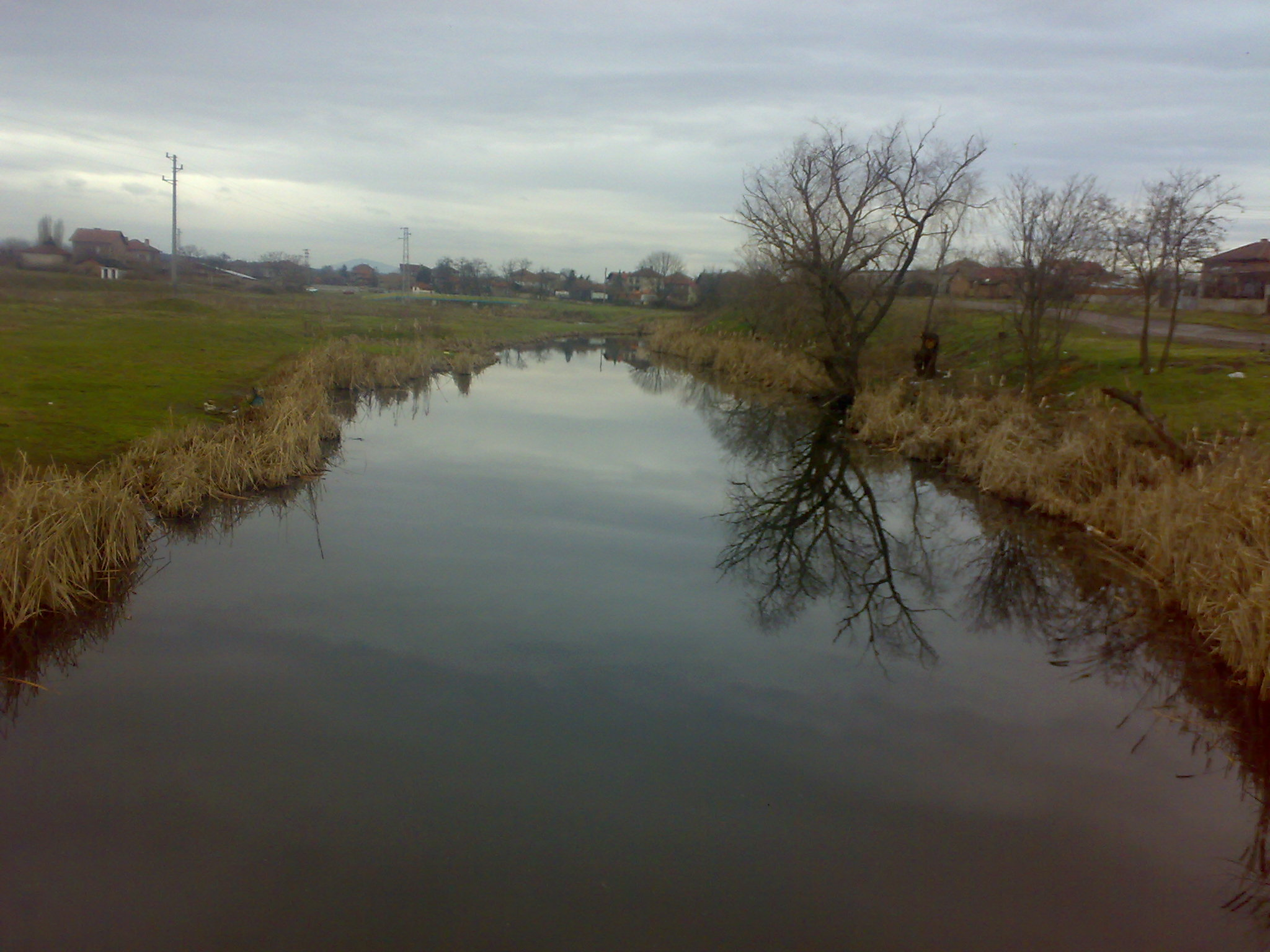
- River Banska in Dobrich

Location
- Country: Bulgaria

Physical characteristics
- Source
  - location: 41.894315°N 25.176265°E
  - elevation: 686 m
- Mouth
  - location: Maritsa
  - coordinates: 42.0634°N 25.5632°E
  - elevation: 98 m
- Length: 37 km
- Basin size: 337 km²
- Discharge
  - average: 3.6 m³/s

Basin features
- Progression: Maritsa→ Aegean Sea
- Tributaries
  - left: Sazlakdere, Saltakdere, Kurtdere, Gorskoizvorsa River
  - right: Selsko dere, Uzundere, Domuzdere, Gidiklidere,
- Waterbodies: Garvanovo Dam

The Banska river (Bulgarian: Банска река), also known as Dobrichka reka (Bulgarian: Добричка река) is a river in Haskovo Province, southeastern Bulgaria. The river is 37 kilometres (23 mi) long.

The Banska springs out from the base of St.Elias Peak(801.3 m) at 686 m altitude in the Eastern Rhodopes. It passes through the villages of Susam, Tatarevo, Garvanovo, Klokotnitsa, Kasnakovo and Dobrich. Between Tatarevo and Garvanovo it forms the Boaza Gorge. The river flows into the Maritsa near Dimitrovgrad as a right tributary.

In 1230 the Battle of Klokotnitsa occurred near the banks of the river.

The Banska River is inhabited by a large number of fish species, including the Mullet, Danube Bleak, the Carassius, Vimba and the Common Nase.
