= Sovolyanska Bistritsa =

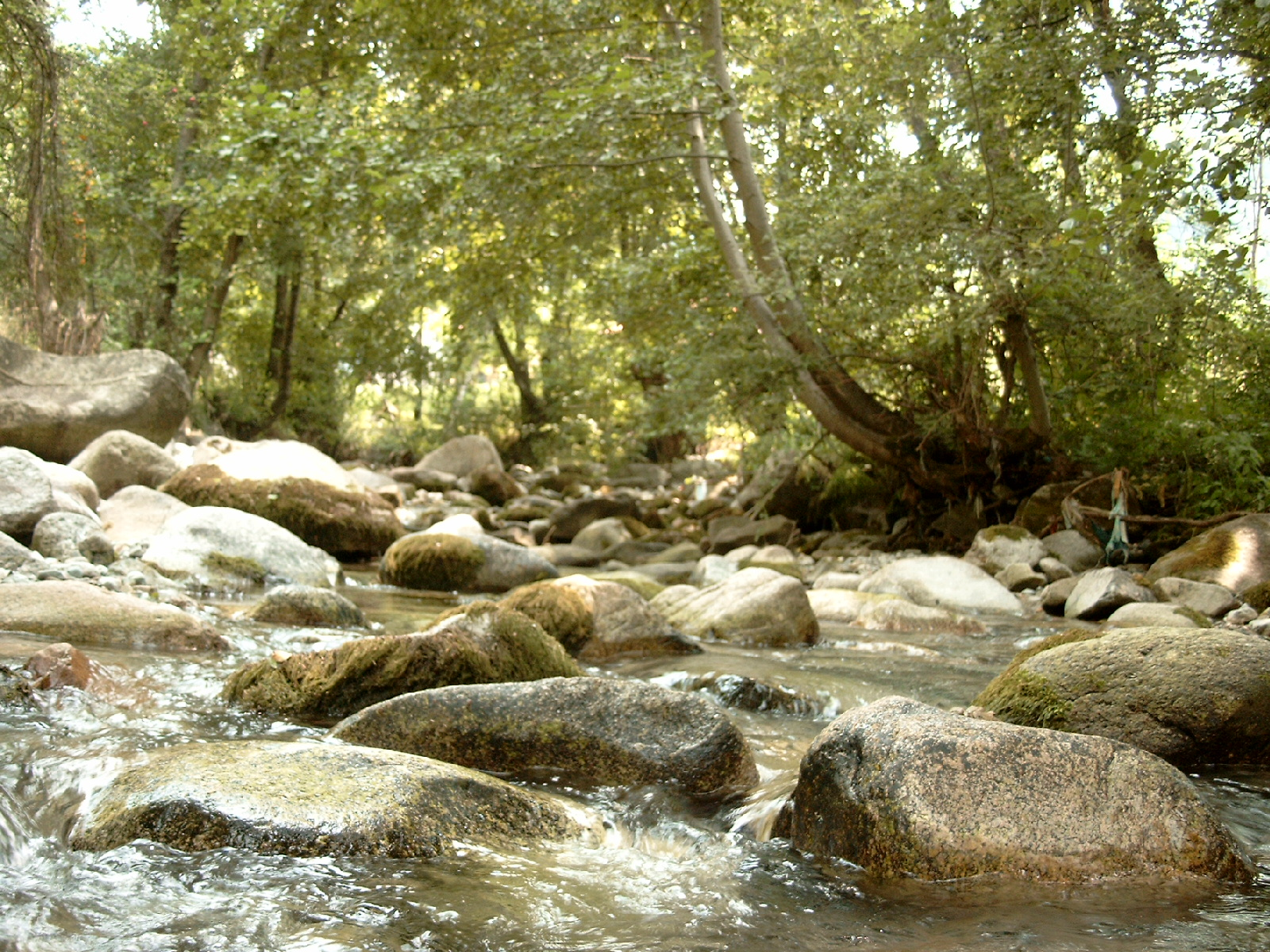

Location
- Country: Bulgaria

Physical characteristics
- Source
  - location: SE of Ruen, Osogovo
  - coordinates: 42°9′50.04″N 22°31′40.08″E
  - elevation: 2,182 m (7,159 ft)
- Mouth
  - location: Struma
  - coordinates: 42°18′51.12″N 22°45′41.04″E
  - elevation: 462 m (1,516 ft)
- Length: 51 km (32 mi)
- Basin size: 300 km^{2} (120 sq mi)

Basin features
- Progression: Struma→ Aegean Sea

The Sovolyanska Bistritsa (Bulgarian: Соволянска Бистрица) is a river in western Bulgaria, a right tributary of the Struma. The river is situated in the southern reaches of the Kraishte geographical region and is 51 km long. It drains the northern slopes of the mountain ranges of Osogovo and Lisets, the southern slopes of the Chudinska planina, the whole Kamenitsa Valley and part of the Kyustendil Valley.

== Geography ==
The river takes its source under the name Glavnya in the Osogovo mountain range at an altitude of 2,182 m, some 1.2 km southeast of the highest summit in Osogovo, Ruen (2,251 m). It flows in direction north–northeast until the village of Garlyano in a deep heavily forested valley. The river then bends north–northwest and crosses the eastern reaches of the Kamenitsa Valley. It leaves the valley downstream of the village of Dolno Selo and forms a deep gorge between the mountain ranges of Chudinska planina to the north and Lisets to the south in direction north–northeast. At the village of Mazarachevo the Sovolyanska Bistritsa enters the Kyustendil Valley, where it flows into the Struma, at an altitude of 462 m, some 900 m southeast of the village of Konyavo.

It borders the basins of the rivers Dragovishtitsa to the north and northwest, the Glogoshka and the Eleshnitsa to the south and southeast — all three right tributaries of the Struma, as well as the drainage basin of the river Vardar. Its catchment area covers a territory of 300 km^{2}, or 1.73% of Struma's total.

The Sovolyanska Bistritsa has predominantly rain–snow feed with high water in April and low water in September. The average annual flow at the village of Sovolyano is 2.29 m^{3}/s.

== Settlements and economy ==
The river flows entirely in Kyustendil Province. There are ten villages along its course, all of them situated in Kyustendil Municipality — Garlyano, Rasovo, Dolno Selo, Tserovitsa, Karshalevo, Mazarachevo, Sovolyano, Skrinyano, Nikolichevtsi and Yabalkovo. Its waters are used for irrigation in the Kamenitsa and Kyustendil valleys. Near the village of Garlyano is located the small Osogovo Hydro Power Plant.

A 7.3 km section of the third class III-6001 road follows its valley between Sovolyano and Dolno Selo. The gorge between Chudinska planina and Lisets is traversed by a section of railway line No. 6 Sofia–Pernik–Kyustendil–Gyueshevo served by the Bulgarian State Railways.
