= Krumm (disambiguation) =

Krumm is a surname.

Krumm may also refer to:

- Krumm, monster from Aaahh!!! Real Monsters
- Krumm House, historic building in Columbus, Ohio, U.S.
- Krumm (river), Germany

== See also ==
- Krum
- Krumme
