= Martinka (river) =

Location
- Country: Bulgaria

Physical characteristics
- Source
  - location: Chirpan Heights
  - coordinates: 42°18′42.15″N 25°23′0.83″E
  - elevation: 403 m (1,322 ft)
- Mouth
  - location: Maritsa
  - coordinates: 42°1′48.87″N 25°42′3.12″E
  - elevation: 87 m (285 ft)
- Length: 55 km (34 mi)
- Basin size: 395 km^{2} (153 sq mi)

Basin features
- Progression: Maritsa→ Aegean Sea

The Martinka (Bulgarian: Мартинка) is a river in southern Bulgaria, a left tributary of the river Maritsa, with a length of 55 km.

The river takes its source at an altitude of 403 m in the Chirpan Heights, at 2.7 km northwest of the village of Vinarovo. It flows in southeastern direction through the Upper Thracian Plain in a wide shallow valley. The Martinka flows into the Maritsa at an altitude of 87 m at 2.4 km southeast of the village of Brod.

Its drainage basin covers a territory of 395 km^{2} or 0.75% of the Maritsa's total and borders the drainage basins of the Stara reka and Merichlerska reka to the southwest, the Sazliyka to the northeast, and the Arpadere to the east, all of them left tributaries of the Maritsa.

The Martinka has predominantly rain feed with high water in January–May and low water in July–October.

The river flows in Stara Zagora Province and Haskovo Province. There are ten villages along its course: Vinarovo, Malko Tranovo, Dimitrievo, Samuilovo, Byal Izvor in Stara Zagora Province, and Stransko, Radievo, Golyamo Asenovo, Brod and Zlatopole in Haskovo Province. Its waters are utilised for irrigation for the intensive agriculture in the Upper Thracian Plain.
