= Zdravets =

Zdravets (also written Zdravetz; or Здравец in Cyrillic) may refer to:

== Placenames in Bulgaria ==
- Zdravets, Haskovo Province, a village in Dimitrovgrad municipality
- Zdravets, Plovdiv Province, a village in Laki municipality, Plovdiv Province
- Zdravets, Razgrad Province, a village in Samuil municipality, Razgrad Province
- Zdravets, Targovishte Province, a village in Targovishte municipality, Targovishte Province
- Zdravets, Varna Province, a village in Avren municipality

== Biology ==
- Geranium macrorrhizum, a plant in the Geraniaceae family
