= Skobelevo =

Skobelevo refers to the following places in Bulgaria:

- Skobelevo, Haskovo Province
- Skobelevo, Lovech Province
- Skobelevo, Plovdiv Province
- Skobelevo, Sliven Province
- Skobelevo, Stara Zagora Province
