= Krepost =

Krepost (Cyrillic forms: крепость, крепост) means "fortress" in several Slavic languages, such as Russian and Bulgarian. It may refer to:

- Asenova Krepost
- Krepost Sveaborg
- Krepost, Haskovo Province
- Samuilova Krepost
