= Chernogorovo =

Chernogorovo may refer to either of these two Bulgarian villages:

- Chernogorovo, Pazardzhik Province
- Chernogorovo, Haskovo Province
