= Karamantsi =

Karamantsi Karamantsi
- Village
- Location within Bulgaria
- Coordinates: 41°50′N 25°20′E
- Country: Bulgaria
- Province: Haskovo Province
- Municipality: Mineralni bani

Population (2016)
  - Total: ▲1,272
- Time zone: UTC+2 (EET)
  - Summer (DST): UTC+3 (EEST)

Karamantsi is a village in the municipality of Mineralni bani, in Haskovo Province, in southern Bulgaria.

As of 31 December 2016 the village of Karamantsi has 1272 inhabitants. The village is entirely inhabited by ethnic Turks.
