= Vinevo =

- Village
- Location within Bulgaria
- Coordinates: 41°49′N 25°19′E
- Country: Bulgaria
- Province: Haskovo Province
- Municipality: Mineralni bani

Population (2016)
  - Total: ▲356
- Time zone: UTC+2 (EET)
  - Summer (DST): UTC+3 (EEST)

Vinevo is a village in the municipality of Mineralni bani, in Haskovo Province, in southern Bulgaria.

As of 31 December 2016 the village of Vinevo has 356 inhabitants. The village is entirely inhabited by ethnic Turks.
