= Dimitrovgrad Municipality =

Dimitrovgrad Municipality may refer to:

- Dimitrovgrad Municipality, Bulgaria
- Dimitrovgrad, Serbia
