= Dobrich (disambiguation) =

Dobrich may refer to:

== Places in Bulgaria ==
- Dobrich, a city
  - Dobrich Province
  - Dobrichka Municipality
- Dobrich, Haskovo Province, a village
- Dobrich, Yambol Province, a village in Yambol Province

== People with the name ==
- Hans Döbrich, German army pilot
- Virginia Dobrich, Uruguayan entertainer

== See also ==
- Dobric (disambiguation)
