= Kolets =

- Village
- Location within Bulgaria
- Coordinates: 41°51′N 25°20′E
- Country: Bulgaria
- Province: Haskovo Province
- Municipality: Mineralni bani

Population (2016)
  - Total: ▲213
- Time zone: UTC+2 (EET)
  - Summer (DST): UTC+3 (EEST)

Kolets is a village in the municipality of Mineralni bani, in Haskovo Province, in southern Bulgaria.

As of 31 December 2016 the village of Kolets has 213 inhabitants. The village is almost entirely inhabited by ethnic Turks. Sometimes the old name of "Kazakli" is used to refer to this village.
