= Sarnitsa, Haskovo Province =

- Village
- Location within Bulgaria
- Coordinates: 41°44′N 24°02′E
- Country: Bulgaria
- Province: Haskovo Province
- Municipality: Mineralni bani
- Time zone: UTC+2 (EET)
  - Summer (DST): UTC+3 (EEST)

Sarnitsa, Haskovo Province is a village in the municipality of Mineralni bani, in Haskovo Province, in southern Bulgaria.
