= Dobric =

Dobric, Dobříc or Dobrić may refer to:

- Dobříč (Plzeň-North District), a municipality and village in the Plzeň Region, Czech Republic
- Dobříč (Prague-West District), a municipality and village in the Central Bohemian Region, Czech Republic
- Dobric, a village in Căianu Mic Commune, Bistrița-Năsăud County, Romania
- Dobric (river), a river in Romania
- Dobrić, a village in Serbia
- Dobrič, a village in Bosnia and Herzegovina

== See also ==
- Dobrich (disambiguation)
- Dobříš
- Dobřív
