= Angel Voivoda (village) =

- Village
- Location within Bulgaria
- Coordinates: 41°49′44″N 25°17′10″E
- Country: Bulgaria
- Province: Haskovo Province
- Municipality: Mineralni bani

Population (2016)
  - Total: 443
- Time zone: UTC+2 (EET)
  - Summer (DST): UTC+3 (EEST)

Angel Voivoda (village) is a village in the municipality of Mineralni bani, in Haskovo Province, in southern Bulgaria.

As of 31 December 2016 the village of Angel Voivoda has 443 inhabitants. The village is entirely inhabited by ethnic Turks.
