= Merichleri =

Town in Bulgaria

Coordinates: 42°08′N 25°30′E

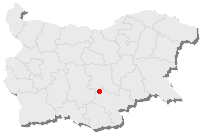
Locator map of Merichleri in South-central Bulgaria.

Merichleri (Bulgarian: Меричлери [mɛrit͡ʃˈlɛri]) is a small town located in the Dimitrovgrad Municipality of Haskovo Province, within South-central Bulgaria.

It is located near the Maritsa River, at 150 metres (490 ft) in altitude. The population of the town was 2,011 residents as of 2006.

== Features ==
=== Mineral springs ===
There are mineral springs in the locale, of healing and spa importance since the ancient Thracians. The mineral water is mainly characterized as moderately mineralized hyper-thermal, and was used in ancient Greek and Thracian natural medicine for treatment of diseases and poisoning. The contemporary natural medicine balneology resort facility is near the town center.

=== Land art sculpture ===
The artist Dan Tenev, created a huge land art sculptural installation in Merichleri, titled Numerical Rows. It was completed in 2010.

== See also ==
- Thracian Bulgarians
- The Destruction of Thracian Bulgarians in 1913
