= Varbitsa, Haskovo Province =

Varbitsa
- Village
- Location in Bulgaria
- Coordinates: 42°03′00″N 25°20′30″E
- Country: Bulgaria
- Province: Haskovo Province
- Municipality: Dimitrovgrad
- Time zone: UTC+2 (EET)
  - Summer (DST): UTC+3 (EEST)

Varbitsa is a village in the municipality of Dimitrovgrad, in Haskovo Province, in southern Bulgaria.
