= Vladislav Panev =

Bulgarian financier and politician (born 1976)

Personal details
- Born: 6 April 1976 (age 50) Dimitrovgrad, Bulgaria, Bulgaria
- Party: Independent
- Other political affiliations: Green Movement (2016-2024)
- Education: University of National and World Economy
- Profession: Bulgarian politician, economist

Vladislav Panev (Bulgarian: Владислав Панев) is a Bulgarian economist and politician. He has been one of the co-chairs of the Green Movement. He has been a member of the National Assembly (Bulgaria) since the April 2021 Bulgarian parliamentary election.

In the run-up to the 2024 Bulgarian parliamentary election, Panev announced that he was leaving the Green Movement party due to its decision to contest the elections outside of the PP-DB coalition.
