= Chirpan Heights =

Hilly ridge in Bulgaria

- Bulgarian: Чирпански възвишения
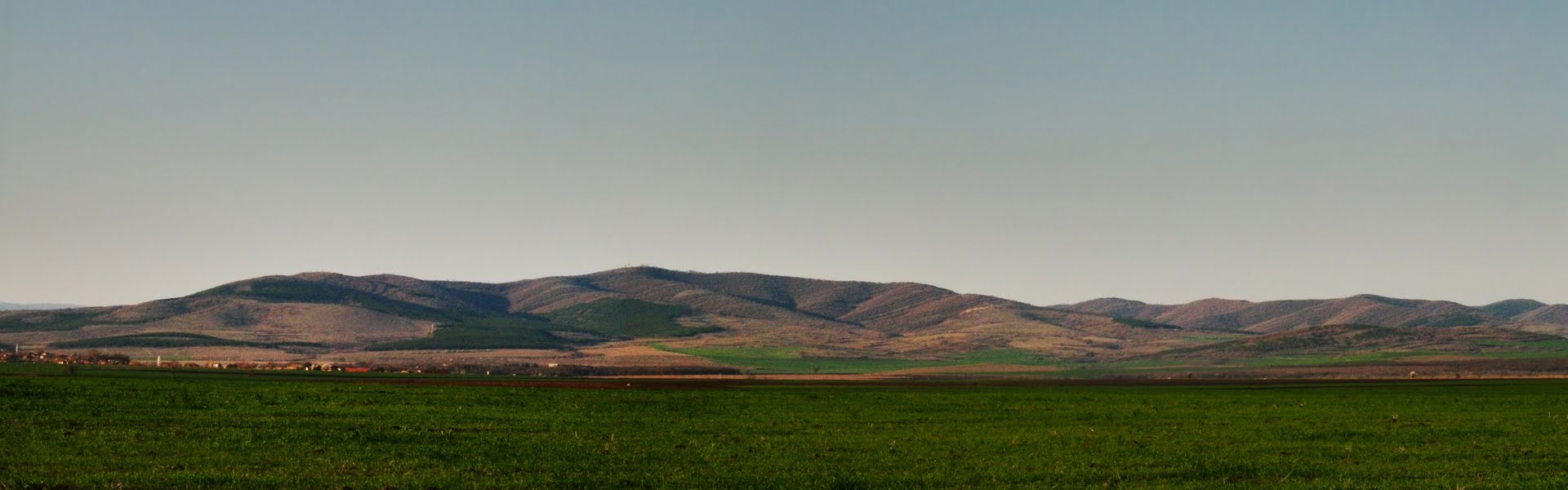

Highest point
- Peak: Kitkata
- Elevation: 650 m (2,130 ft)
- Coordinates: 42°19′37.2″N 25°16′15.6″E

Dimensions
- Length: 20 km (12 mi) west-east
- Width: 15 km (9.3 mi) north-south

Geography
- Location within Bulgaria
- Country: Bulgaria

The Chirpan Heights (Bulgarian: Чирпански възвишения) are a hilly ridge in the southernmost reaches of the Sredna Gora mountain range as it descends to the Upper Thracian Plain in central Bulgaria. Administratively, they lie in Stara Zagora Province.

The heights rise north of the town of Chirpan, between the valleys of the rivers the Omurovska reka to the west and the Sazliyka river to the east, both left tributaries of the Maritsa. In the north, the valleys of the small rivers the Kalfenska of the Omurovska reka basin and the Chatalka of the Sazliyka drainage separate hills from the Sarnena Sredna Gora. In the southwest, south, and southeast, their slopes gradually sink into the Upper Thracian Plain. The Chirpan Heights span 20 km from west to east and 15 km from north to south. Their maximum height is at mount Kitkata (650.4 m), rising 2.5 km northwest of the village of Sredno Gradishte.

They are formed mainly by marl and limestone rocks and have a highly dissected relief. The climate is transitional continental with warm summer, mild winter and short span of snow cover. Several left tributaries of the Maritsa river originate from the Chirpan Heights — the Tekirska, the Starata reka, the Merichlerska reka and the Martinka. The soils are mostly cinnamon forest. The heights are generally deforested, with limited areas are covered by oak forests. There are extensive pastures favourable the development of animal husbandry, as well as excellent conditions for viticulture.

There are 13 villages: Bratya Daskalovi, Vinarovo, Golyam Dol, Izvorovo, Mogilovo, Naydenovo, Rakitnitsa, Rupkite, Spasovo, Sredno Gradishte, Stoyan-Zaimovo, Saedinenie and Yavorovo.

In direction north–south a 15.1 km stretch of the third class III-608 road Kazanlak–Saedinenie–Chirpan passes through the heights between the villages of Saedinenie and Spasovo. Southeast of the Chirpan Heights in the Upper Thracian Plain passes the Trakia motorway that connects the capital Sofia and the port of Burgas on the Black Sea.
