= Zdravets, Haskovo Province =

Zdravets
- Village
- Location in Bulgaria
- Coordinates: 42°08′30″N 25°34′20″E
- Country: Bulgaria
- Province: Haskovo Province
- Municipality: Dimitrovgrad
- Time zone: UTC+2 (EET)
  - Summer (DST): UTC+3 (EEST)

Zdravets is a village in the municipality of Dimitrovgrad, in Haskovo Province, in southern Bulgaria.

== Etymology ==
The meaning of Zdravets (Bulgarian: Здравец) is Geranium, which thrives in the east-European country of Bulgaria.
