= Krumme =

Krumme is a German surname. Notable people with the surname include:

- Avery Krumme (born 2008), American freestyle skier
- Elisabeth Krumme (1897–1984), German lawyer

== See also ==
- Krumm
