= Ruen (mountain) =

European Mountain

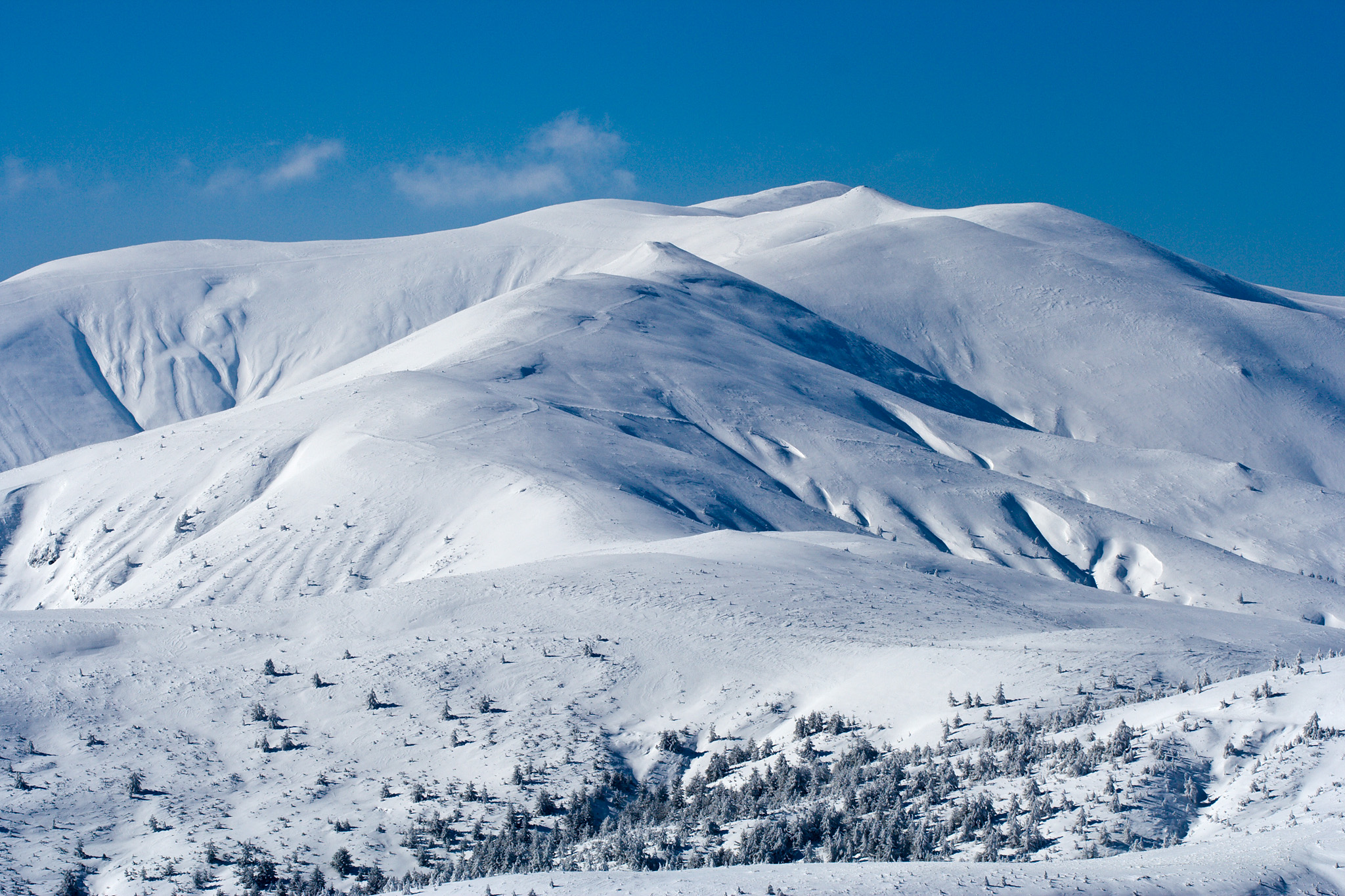
- Ruen seen from the Bulgarian side of Osogovo

Highest point
- Elevation: 2,251 m (7,385 ft)
- Prominence: 1,411 m (4,629 ft)
- Listing: Ribu
- Coordinates: 42°9′28.73″N 22°30′58.76″E

Geography
- Location within Bulgaria
- Location: Kyustendil Province, Bulgaria; North Macedonia
- Parent range: Osogovo

Ruen (Bulgarian and Macedonian: Руен [ˈru.ɛn]) is the highest peak of the Osogovo range, standing at 2,252 metres (7,388 ft). The peak is situated on the border between Bulgaria (Kyustendil Province) and North Macedonia (Makedonska Kamenica Municipality). It is formed by granite and metamorphic schists and is covered with Alpine meadow grasslands.

Ruen is included in the 100 Tourist Sites of Bulgaria under No. 27. The main starting points for climbing are Osogovo hut, Three Beeches hotel and the village of Gyueshevo.

Two right tributaries of the river Struma spring from the Bulgarian side of Ruen — the Sovolyanska Bistritsa at 1.2 kilometres (0.75 mi) southeast of the summit and the Eleshnitsa at 400 metres (0.25 mi) southwest of it.
