= Susam (village) =

- Village
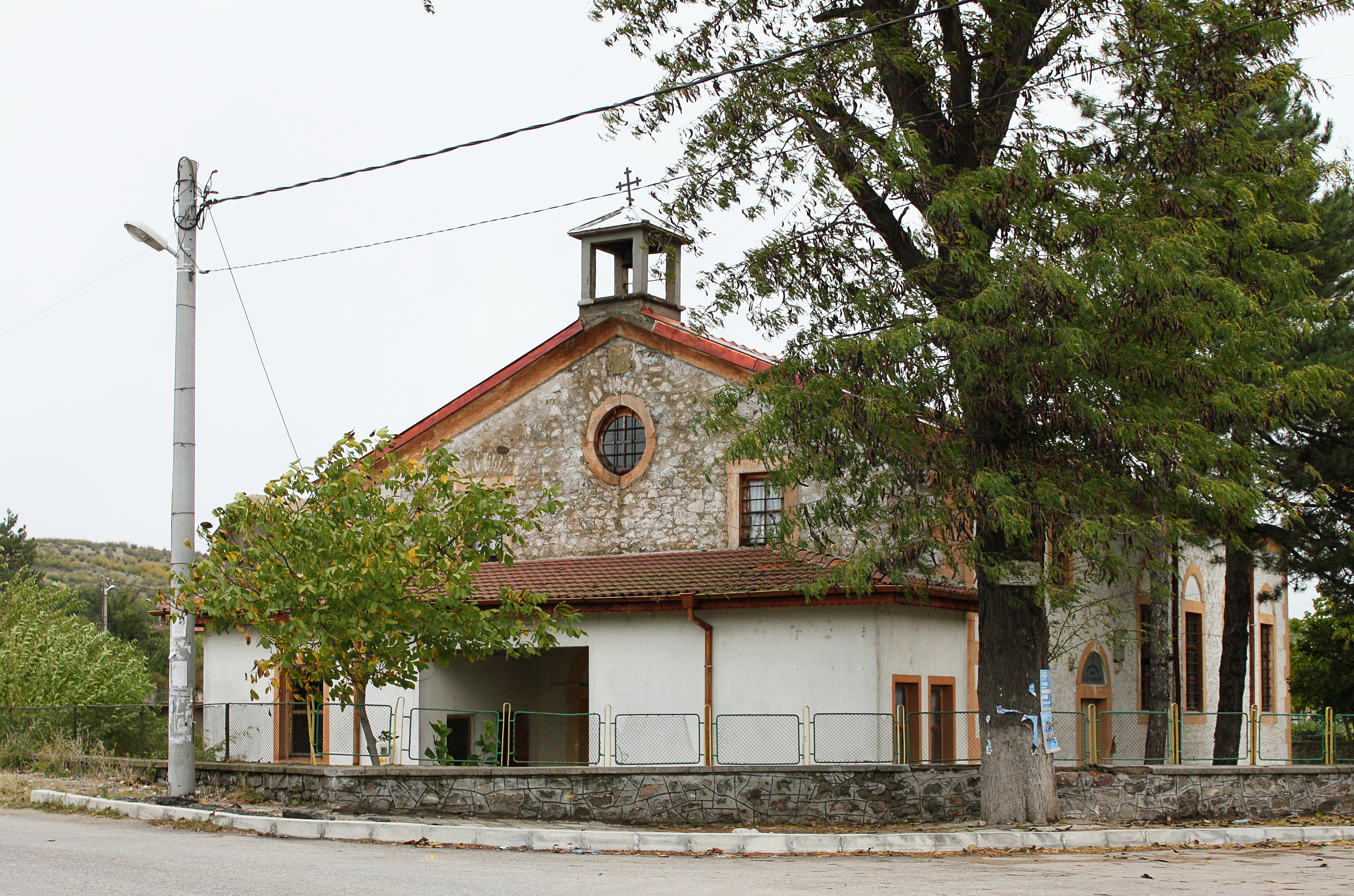
- Village chapel

- Location within Bulgaria
- Coordinates: 41°58′N 25°21′E
- Country: Bulgaria
- Province: Haskovo Province
- Municipality: Mineralni bani
- Time zone: UTC+2 (EET)
  - Summer (DST): UTC+3 (EEST)

Susam (Bulgarian: Сусам [suˈsam]) is a village in the municipality of Mineralni bani, in Haskovo Province, in southern Bulgaria.
