= Germacrone =

Names
- Preferred IUPAC name (3E,7E)-3,7-Dimethyl-10-(propan-2-ylidene)cyclodeca-3,7-dien-1-one

Identifiers
| CAS Number | 6902-91-6 |
| 3D model (JSmol) | Interactive image |
| ChEBI | CHEBI:80830 |
| ChemSpider | 4940991 |
| EC Number | 834-535-3 |
| KEGG | C16966 |
| PubChem CID | 6436348 |
| UNII | E2WQ6N4FBP |
- InChI: InChI=1S/C15H22O/c1-11(2)14-9-8-12(3)6-5-7-13(4)10-15(14)16/h7-8H,5-6,9-10H2,1-4H3/b12-8+,13-7+ Key: CAULGCQHVOVVRN-SWZPTJTJSA-N
- SMILES: C/C/1=C\CC(=C(C)C)C(=O)C/C(=C/CC1)/C

Properties
| Chemical formula | C_{15}H_{22}O |
| Molar mass | 218.340 g·mol^{−1} |

Hazards
- Occupational safety and health (OHS/OSH)
| Main hazards | flammable |
- Except where otherwise noted, data are given for materials in their standard state (at 25 °C [77 °F], 100 kPa). Infobox references

Germacrone is a sesquiterpene which has been isolated via distillation from the plant species Geranium macrorrhizum. It has shown antiviral properties in an animal model of influenza infection.
