= Gergana (Bulgarian singer) =

Gergana Гергана
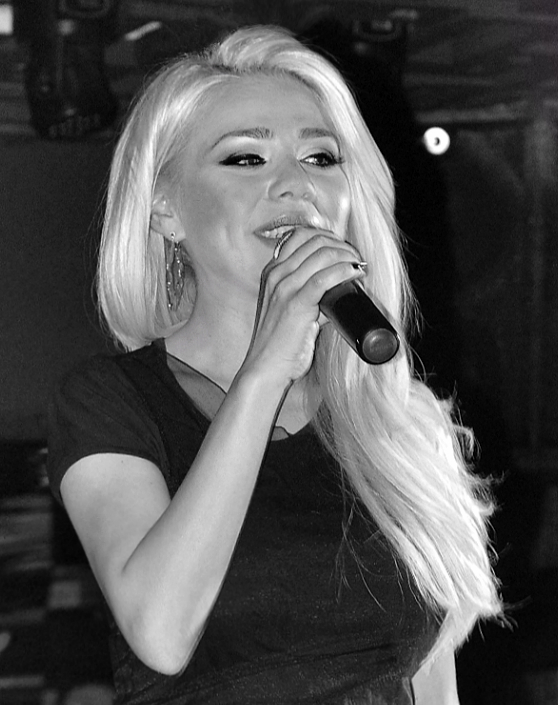
- Gergana in 2015

Background information
- Born: Gergana Georgieva Katsarska; November 30, 1984 (age 41); Dimitrovgrad, Bulgaria
- Genres: Pop-folk, Chalga, Balkan pop
- Occupation: Singer
- Years active: 2003 – present
- Label: Payner

Gergana Georgieva Katsarska (Bulgarian: Гергана Георгиева Кацарска; born 30 November 1984) is a Bulgarian pop-folk singer, often referred to as "the Barbie doll of pop-folk". Her early career (2003–2004) was marked by the runaway success of her debut single "Губя те бавно" followed by a best-selling debut album. She released three more albums between 2004 and 2007, and has since released a number of singles.

== Life and career ==
=== 1984–2002: Early life ===
Gergana was born on November 30, 1984, in Dimitrovgrad, to Lilyana and Georgi Katsarski but grew up with her grandparents in Govedartsi. She has an older sister named Lazarina. Her cousin is popular soccer player Stoyko Sakaliev. Gergana completed her secondary education at the Dimitrovgrad Music School, where she specialized in Pop Singing. On prom night, Gergana was among the selected students who performed in front of the entire class. A recording of that performance brought producer Todor Dimitrov – Tokicha's attention on Gergana and in 2003, she signed with Payner Music.

=== 2003: First steps and greatest success ===
Gergana's star rises in the fall of 2003, when her first single "Губя те бавно" ("Gubya Te Bavno", translated as "Slowly I'm losing you") became a runaway success. Her eponymous debut album "Губя те бавно" was released in the end of 2003 to become one of the best selling albums of 2003 and 2004 having sold over 70,000 copies. In the summer of 2004 Gergana recorded her first duet song "For you, love" with her then good friend Anelia.

=== 2004–2005: Както Никой Друг and Сини Очи ===
In late 2004, she released her second studio album "Както Никой Друг" ("Like no one else"), which was dedicated to her mother, who died on September 30, 2004, due to cancer. The album did very well in charts, selling over 40,000 copies in 2004. The leading single "Боли" ("It Hurts") was simultaneously released in two versions (original and acoustic) with separate music videos. The song "Последна Вечер" ("Last Night") was released as a second single in the summer of 2004. In the summers of 2004 and 2005, Gergana participated in the national summer tour of Payner, "Planeta Prima". On December 16, 2005, Gergana released her third studio album called "Сини Очи" ("Blue eyes"). It sold 20,000 copies and was ranked 5th in Best-selling album of 2005 charts. The singer shot music videos for both versions of the leading song "Сини Очи", following the strategy of her second album. In Spring, Gergana released a new single, "Някой Ден, Може Би" ("Someday, Maybe"). In Spring 2006 Gergana shot a video to the song "Сладката Страна На Нещата" ("The sweet side of things") in the Graf Ignatievo air base. Music videos for "До Утре" ("'Till Tomorrow") and "Искам Само Любовта Ти" ("I Only Want Your Love") followed. She also took part for the third time in the summer tour of Payner Music.

=== 2006–2007: 'The sweet side of things"' ===
On February 14, 2007, she releases her fourth studio album "Sweet Side Of Things," which contains 10 new songs. Just weeks after the album sold over 5,000 copies. First released song "Карма" is presented as a chat program on New Year's TV Planeta. The video was released almost simultaneously with the new album. On April 20 she releases the video of "Una Passión", the first song performed by Gergana in a foreign language, in this case Spanish. Summer of 2007, for the fourth consecutive year, she participates in the national tour of Payner Music. At the same time she released a new song "Може Би Точно Ти", which features new hip-hop singer Zhoro Rapa.

=== 2008–2014: Post-Tokicha era: New Singles & Hiatus ===
After a short break in early 2008 Gergana issued duet song "Забрави" ("Forget"), which has partnered with Zhoro Rapa. July 2008 she releases the video for "Върви Си" ("Leave"), which combines computer animation with 3D effects. Gergana for the first time not participated in the tour Payner Music, but at the expense of singing in over 20 cities as part of a tour Bulsatcom advertising. In early 2009 released the video for "Защото Те Обичам," which was presented at the Seventh Annual Music Awards of Planeta TV. On the occasion of March 8 Gergana recorded a song dedicated to her mother, "Благодаря Ти"("Thank You"), and premiered on Planeta TV on 15 April 2009. On 21 September 2009 she releases the video for "Имам Нужда (I Need)" where she shot her boyfriend, and on December 24 she releases video for "To When". In mid-May 2010 expires on the internet song "Нова Любов" ("New Love"). Gergana failed to shoot video of this song, but instead, at the end of the same month the singer releases the video for the song "Да Започнем От Средата" ("Let's start from the middle"), which became a summer hit as fans of the show on Planet TV "Folkmaraton." On October 29, 2010, released the video for the song "Facebook", which in the words of Gergana is dedicated global network Facebook, where she meets many friends. On December 30, 2010, she releases the video for the ballad "Който Иска Да Вярва" ("Whoever Wants to Believe"), and on June 3, 2011, appears a new single called "Първичен инстинкт," a joint project with her friend Galin, with the video of the song. On December 20, Gergana performed her new song "Ще Издържиш Ли?" ("Will You Resist?") at the presentation of her colleague and friend Preslava's album "Как ти стои" ("How It Suits You").

On June 21, 2012, after a year-long opause she presents the video for her new single – "Мирис На Любов" ("A Scent of Love"). On November 26, 2012, is presented the video for the second duet with Galin – "Вкусът Остава" ("The Taste Remains"). On December 14, 2012, Gergana's label presents its latest compilation "The Golden Hits of Payner" with "The best of Gergana" released under #4. On February 26, 2013, Gergana performed a medley of rock remixes of her greatest hits at the 11th Annual Music Awards of Planeta TV.

=== 2015–present: Comeback & Media Scandal ===
After one year with no new single, on January 5, 2015, Gergana releases a new single and video – Твоите Думи (English: Your Words), featuring Galin. It debuts at number 29 on the weekly chart of Signal BG – "Best 50", 6 days after its release. Next week, it climbed to number 4 on the chart. Same week, the song debuted at number 4 on the weekly chart of Radio Veselina. On its third week the song climbed to number 3. After a few weeks in top 5, "Твоите Думи" climbed to number 2. It also debuted at number 12 on the meloman.bg's Pop-Folk Chart. It climbed to number 6 on its second week. After a few weeks in top 10, on the week of 2 February the song topped the chart and stayed for one week.

On 9 February, a Bulgarian reality TV show Gospodari na Efira, revealed that backvocals of the song are from British- Palestinian hip-hop singer Shadia Mansour's song "Kollon 3endon Dababaat", whose lyrics concern the tragedies of the Israeli–Palestinian conflict. The song was immediately pulled and lead to a public apology from the singer and her record label.

In late 2015, Gergana unexpectedly released a ballad named "Ogan v Dazhda" (Fire in the Rain) on Planeta TV's annual Christmas Eve programme. The music video for the song premiered on 8 January 2016 on the official YouTube channel of her producer company – PlanetaOfficial.

== Awards ==
- 2003: Annual Music Awards of Planeta TV for Best New Singer.
- 2003: Annual Music Awards of NovFolk Magazine for Best New Singer. .
- 2003: Annual Music Awards of Planeta TV for Best Album for "Губя те бавно"
- 2003: Annual Music Awards of Planeta TV for Best Video for "Губя те бавно"
- 2004: Annual Music Awards of Planeta TV: Special award of M-Tel.
- 2006: Annual Music Awards of Planeta TV: Special award of Nestle.
- 2007: Annual Music Awards of Planeta TV: Special award of Nestle.
- 2007: Annual Music Awards of Planeta TV for Summer Hit Song for "Може би точно ти"

== Discography ==
=== Albums ===
- "Губя те бавно" ("I'm losing you slowly") (2003)
- "Както никой друг" ("Like no one else") (2004)
- "Сини очи" ("Blue eyes") (2005)
- "Сладката страна на нещата" ("The sweet side of things") (2007)

=== Singles ===
- "Губя те бавно" (Losing You Slowly) 2003
- "Както Преди" (Like Before) 2003
- "Гасна По Теб" (Dimming Over You) 2004
- "Както Никой Друг" (Like Mo One Else) 2004
- "Твоя Бях" (I Was Yours) 2004
- "Боли" (It Hurts) 2004
- "Някой Ден, Може Би" (Someday, Maybe) 2005
- "Последна Вечер" (Last Night) 2005
- "Сини Очи" (Blue Eyes) 2005
- "Искам Само Любовта Ти" (I Only Want Your Love) 2006
- "До Утре" (Until Tomorrow) 2006
- Karma (Karma) 2007
- Mozhe Bi Tochno Ti (Maybe Exactly You) 2007
- Zabravi (Forget) 2008
- Върви Си (Leave) 2008
- Zashtoto te obicham (Because I Love You) 2009
- Blagodarya ti (Thank You) 2009
- До Кога (How Much More?) 2009
- Facebook 2010
- Parvichen Instinkt (Primal Instinct) 2011
- Miris na lyubov (A Scent Of Love) 2012
- Vkusat Ostava (The Taste Remains) 2012
- От Този Момент (From This Moment On) 2013
- Твоите Думи (Your Words) 2015
- Ogan v Dazhda (Fire In The Rain) 2015
- Samo Za Teb (Only For You) 2018
- Tvoya (Yours) 2018

=== Music videos ===
Year	Title	Director(s)
2003	"Губя те бавно"	Nikolay Skerlev
2003	"Както Преди"	Nikolay Skerlev
2004	"Гасна По Теб"	Nikolay Skerlev
2004	"За Теб Любов" (with Anelia)	Nikolay Skerlev
2004	"Твоя Бях"	Nikolay Skerlev
2004	Boli	Nikolay Skerlev
2005	Boli (acoustic version)'	Nikolay Skerlev
2005	"Някой Ден, Може Би"	Nikolay Skerlev
2005	"Последна Вечер"	Nikolay Skerlev
2006	"Sini Ochi"	Nikolay Skerlev
2006	"Сини Очи - remix"	Georgi Kolev
2006	"Искам Само Любовта Ти"	Nikolay Skerlev
2006	"До Утре"	Nikolay Skerlev
2006	"Сладката Страна На Нещата"	Nikolay Skerlev
2007	"Карма"	Nikolay Skerlev
2007	"Una Passion"	Nikolay Skerlev
2007	"Може Би Точно Ти" (featuring Zhoro Rapa)	Nikolay Skerlev
2008	"Забрави" (featuring Zhoro Rapa)	Tencho Ianchev
2008	"Върви Си"	Mihail Popov
2008	"Раздялата Не Боли"	Nikolay Skerlev
2009	"Защото Те Обичам"	Nikolay Nankov
2009	"Благодаря Ти"	Nikolay Nankov
2009	"Имам Нужда"	Nikolay Skerlev
2009	"До Кога"	Yordan Petkov
2010	"Да Започнем От Средата"	Nikolay Skerlev
2010	"Facebook"	Lyudmil Ilarionov (Lyusi)
2010	"Който Иска Да Вярва"	Yordan Petkov
2011	"Първичен Инстинкт" (featuring Galin)	Nikolay Skerlev
2012	"Мирис На Любов"	Nikolay Skerlev
2012	"Вкусът Остава" (with Galin)	Nikolay Skerlev
2013	"От Този Момент"	Lyudmil Ilarionov (Lyusi)
2015	"Твоите Думи" (featuring Galin)	Lyudmil Ilarionov (Lyusi)
2016	"Ogan V Dazhda"	

=== Tours ===
- Planeta Prima 2004 (2004)
- Planeta Prima 2005 (2005)
- Planeta Prima 2006 (2006)
- Planeta Derby 2007 (2007)
- Bulsatcom Tour (2008) – an advertising tour by TV provider Bulsatcom in 20 Bulgarian cities, featuring Gergana and "Пей с мен" singing contest winner Divna.
- UK Tour (2011)
- USA Tour (2015)
