= Zlatopole, Haskovo Province =

- Village
- Location within Bulgaria
- Coordinates: 42°03′N 25°43′E
- Country: Bulgaria
- Province: Haskovo Province
- Municipality: Dimitrovgrad
- Time zone: UTC+2 (EET)
  - Summer (DST): UTC+3 (EEST)

Zlatopole, Haskovo Province is a village in the municipality of Dimitrovgrad, in Haskovo Province, in southern Bulgaria.
