= Tatarevo, Haskovo Province =

Tatarevo
- Village
- Location in Bulgaria
- Coordinates: 41.944°N 25.397°E
- Country: Bulgaria
- Province: Haskovo Province
- Municipality: Mineralni Bani
- Time zone: UTC+2 (EET)
  - Summer (DST): UTC+3 (EEST)

Tatarevo is a village in the municipality of Mineralni Bani, in Haskovo Province, in southern Bulgaria.
