= Krum (disambiguation) =

Krum was the Khan of the First Bulgarian Empire from 803 to 814.

Krum may also refer to:

== Places ==
- Krum, Haskovo Province, a village in Bulgaria
- Krum, Texas

== Stage name ==
- Krum (rapper) (born 1977), American hip hop artist and musician
- Krum (singer) (born 1986), Bulgarian singer

== Given name ==
Krum is a popular Bulgarian given name, after Khan Krum.

- Krum Bibishkov (born 1982), Bulgarian footballer
- Krum Georgiev, Bulgarian chess grandmaster
- Krum Kyulyavkov, Bulgarian writer, poet, journalist
- Krum Lekarski, Bulgarian equestrian
- Krum Lovkov, Bulgarian footballer
- Krum Milev, Bulgarian football player and manager
- Krum Penev, Bulgarian poet, playwright, and translator
- Krum Stoyanov, Bulgarian footballer
- Krum Vassilev, Bulgarian politician, author, and journalist
- Krum Yanev, Bulgarian footballer
- Krum Zarkov, Bulgarian politician and attorney

== Surname ==
Krum is a variant of the German surname Krumm

- Charles L. Krum, American engineer and key figure in the development of the teleprinter
- Denise Krum, now Denise Lee, New Zealand politician
- Hobart Krum (1833–1914), New York politician
- John M. Krum (1810–1883), mayor of St. Louis, Missouri
- Paola Krum (born 1970), Argentine actress, singer, and dancer

== Other ==
- Viktor Krum, a Harry Potter character
