= Yabalkovo =

Yabalkovo Ябълково
- Village
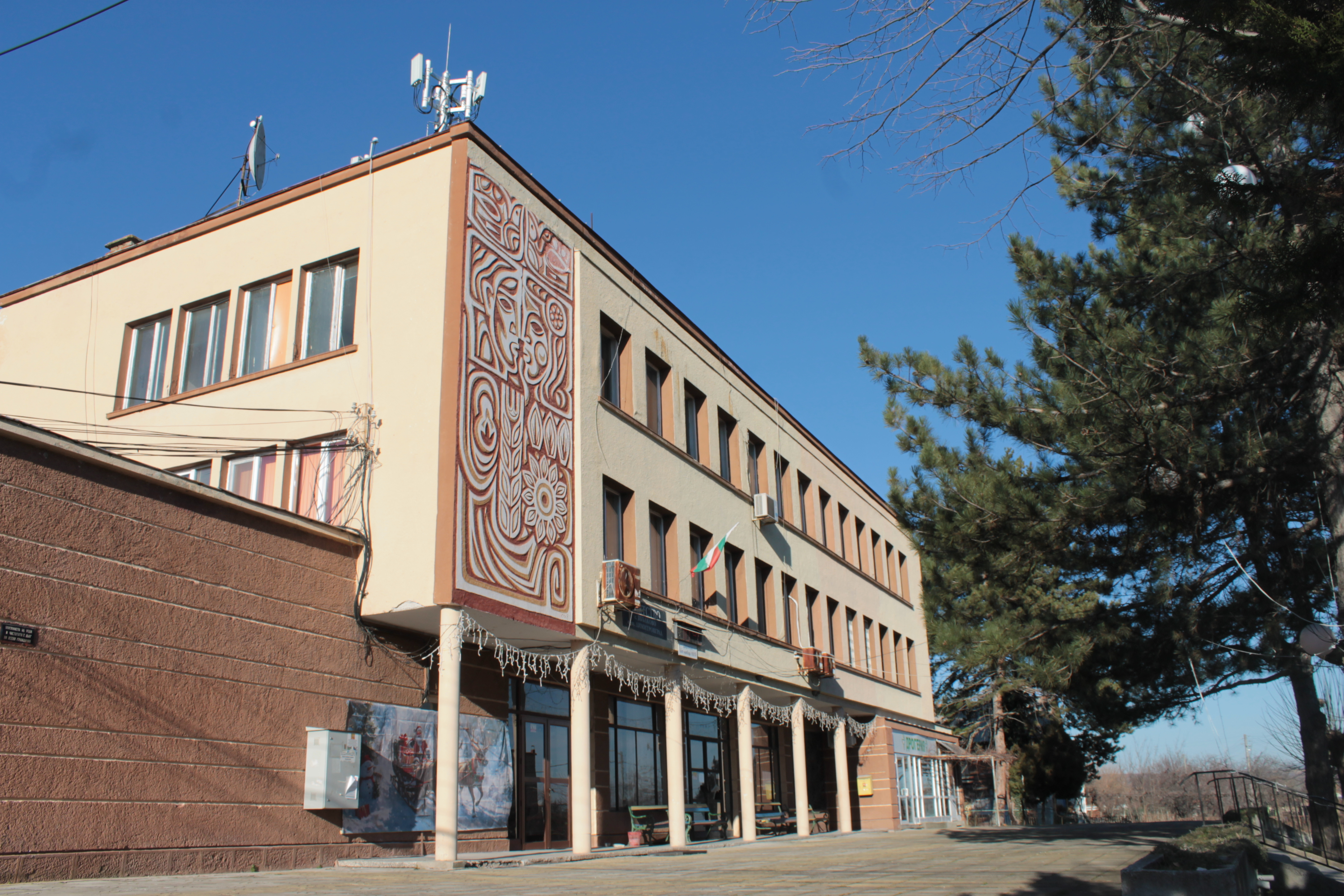
- The village's town hall

- Location within Bulgaria
- Coordinates: 42°04′N 25°27′E
- Country: Bulgaria
- Province: Haskovo Province
- Municipality: Dimitrovgrad

Government
  - Mayor: Dancho Panev Ivanov (GERB)

Population (2024)
  - Total: 1,086
- Time zone: UTC+2 (EET)
  - Summer (DST): UTC+3 (EEST)
- Postal code: 6440
- Area code: 03937

Yabalkovo is a village in the municipality of Dimitrovgrad, in Haskovo Province, in southern Bulgaria.
