= Dobříč (Plzeň-North District) =

- Municipality
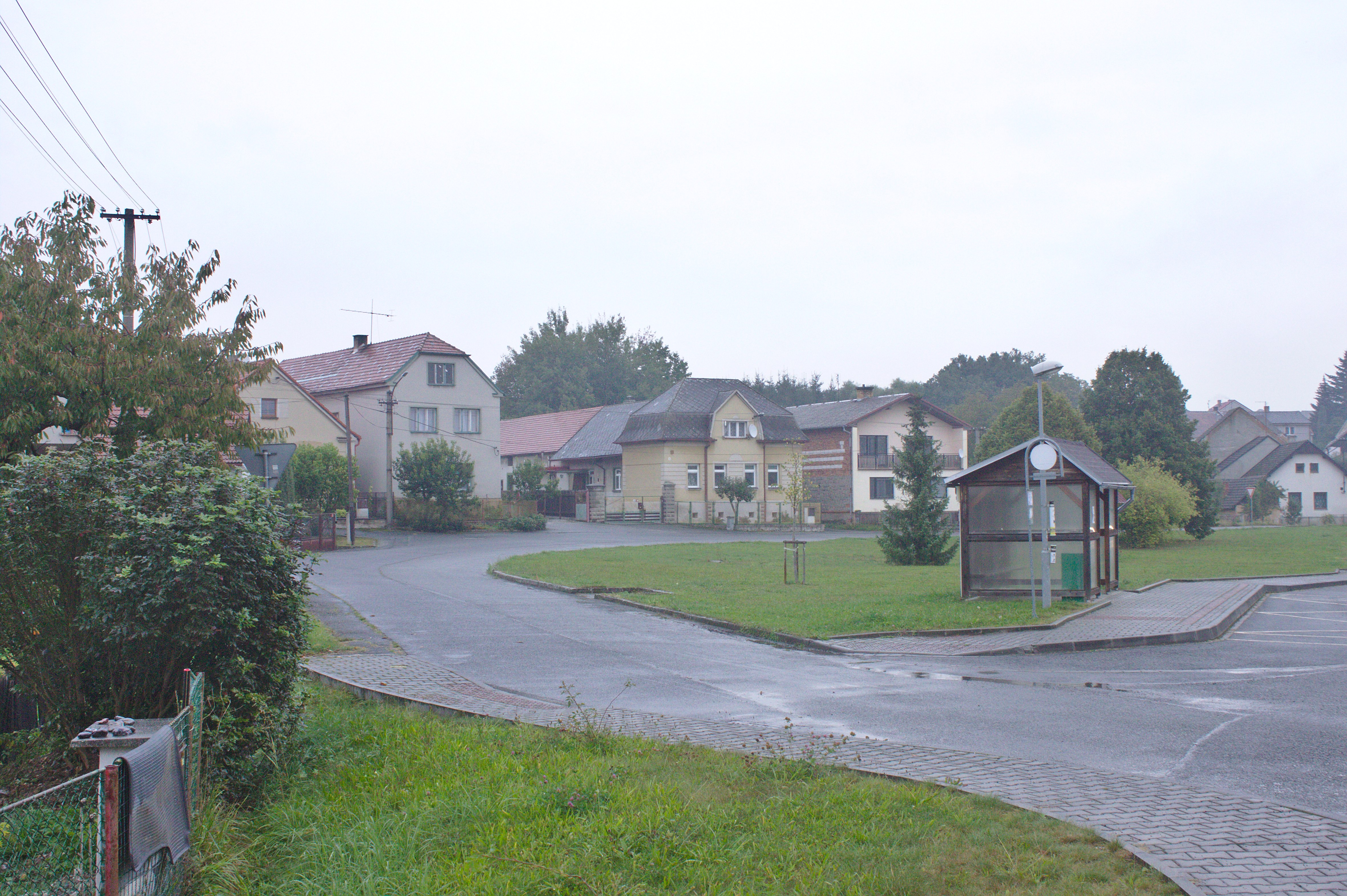
- Centre of Dobříč

- Flag Coat of arms

- Location in the Czech Republic
- Coordinates: 49°53′5″N 13°28′6″E
- Country: Czech Republic
- Region: Plzeň
- District: Plzeň-North
- First mentioned: 1250

Area
  - Total: 7.09 km^{2} (2.74 sq mi)
- Elevation: 398 m (1,306 ft)

Population (2026-01-01)
  - Total: 427
  - Density: 60.2/km^{2} (156/sq mi)
- Time zone: UTC+1 (CET)
  - Summer (DST): UTC+2 (CEST)
- Postal code: 330 05
- Website: www.dobric.cz

Dobříč is a municipality and village in Plzeň-North District in the Plzeň Region of the Czech Republic. It has about 400 inhabitants.

Dobříč lies approximately 17 kilometres (11 mi) north-east of Plzeň and 72 km (45 mi) west of Prague.

== Administrative division ==
Dobříč consists of two municipal parts (in brackets population according to the 2021 census):

- Dobříč (342)
- Čivice (80)

== Demographics ==
Historical population
Year	Pop.	±%
1869	560	—
1880	598	+6.8%
1890	554	−7.4%
1900	546	−1.4%
1910	600	+9.9%
1921	606	+1.0%
1930	535	−11.7%
1950	487	−9.0%
1961	520	+6.8%
1970	489	−6.0%
1980	445	−9.0%
1991	417	−6.3%
2001	390	−6.5%
2011	382	−2.1%
2021	422	+10.5%
Source: Censuses
