= Brod, Haskovo Province =

Brod
- Village
- Location within Bulgaria
- Country: Bulgaria
- Province: Haskovo Province
- Municipality: Dimitrovgrad

Government
  - Mayor: Zhivka Tencheva
- Elevation: 100 m (330 ft)

Population (2024)
  - Total: 729
- Time zone: UTC+2 (EET)
  - Summer (DST): UTC+3 (EEST)

Brod, Haskovo Province, is a village in the municipality of Dimitrovgrad, in Haskovo Province, in southern Bulgaria.

== Location ==
Brod is located in Dimitrovgrad Municipality, about 7km(4,38mi) from Dimitrovgrad. The village is on the left bank of the Maritsa River. The landscape is that of a flatland, with some hills in the north, with the highest point of the village's territory being 180m at Kabuyuk. The main type of soil is alluvial due to the Maritsa River, with some pseudopodzolic, fertile soils. A new protected area will be instituted in Brod for the preservation of rare amphibians and reptiles.

== History ==
The village used to be called Gyucherliy until 1906, due to the fact that there is a ford of the Maritsa River near the village. It used to be populated with Turks, with the first Bulgarian there coming from Veliko Tarnovo. There is a small chapel on the hill before entering the village from Dimitrovgrad called "Sveta Nedelya". It is opened every time on the village's feast day, the 7th July. Part of the Roman road Via Egnatia passes near the village, though it's not preserved well. The village centre has a culture center "Pano Angelov", who was one of the people who led Bulgarian revolutionaries in the Ilinden Uprising. Nowadays, people in the village are mostly Christian Orthodox Bulgarians, with some Gypsy families living in the village. The local church is called "Sveti Georgi".
