= Dobrich, Haskovo Province =

- Village
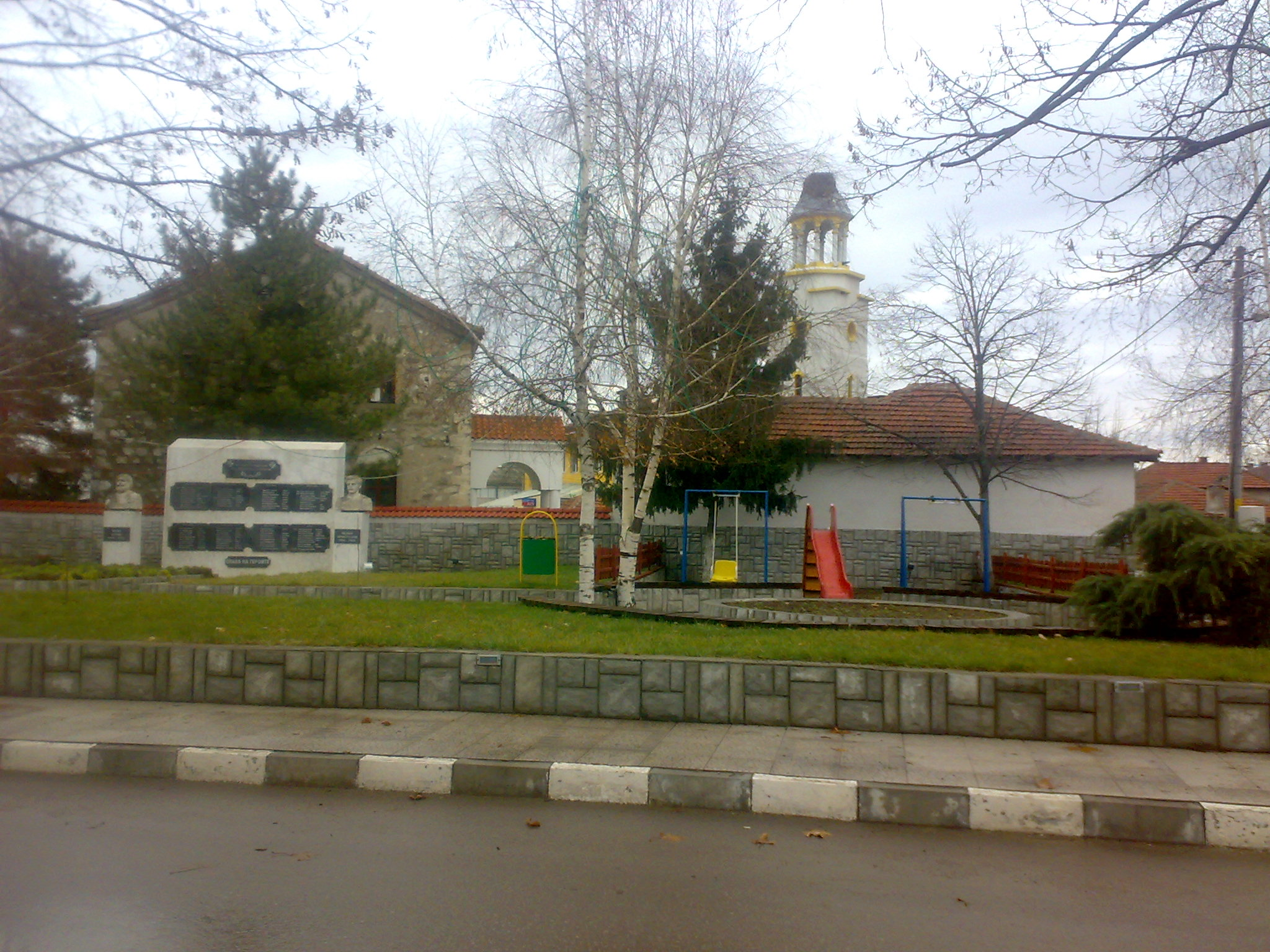
- Village centre

- Location within Bulgaria
- Coordinates: 42°01′1.2″N 25°31′1.2″E
- Country: Bulgaria
- Province: Haskovo Province
- Municipality: Dimitrovgrad

Government
  - Mayor: Marin Marinov
- Time zone: UTC+2 (EET)
  - Summer (DST): UTC+3 (EEST)

Dobrich, Haskovo Province is a village in the municipality of Dimitrovgrad, in Haskovo Province, in southern Bulgaria. It is located 7 kilometers east of Dimitrovgrad. The mayor of the village is Marin Marinov.

There is a Monastery of the Assumption near Dobrich. The holiday of the village is on 15 August and 28 August, the Days of the Assumption (new and old style).
