= Garvanovo =

- Village
- Location within Bulgaria
- Coordinates: 41°58′N 25°27′E
- Country: Bulgaria
- Province: Haskovo Province
- Municipality: Haskovo
- Time zone: UTC+2 (EET)
  - Summer (DST): UTC+3 (EEST)

Garvanovo is a village in the municipality of Haskovo, Haskovo Province, southern Bulgaria.

The village was historically under the jurisdiction of the, (Agaluk of Haskovo)
