= Krepost, Haskovo Province =

- Village
- Location within Bulgaria
- Coordinates: 42°01′N 25°36′E
- Country: Bulgaria
- Province: Haskovo Province
- Municipality: Dimitrovgrad
- Time zone: UTC+2 (EET)
  - Summer (DST): UTC+3 (EEST)

Krepost, Haskovo Province is a village in the municipality of Dimitrovgrad, in Haskovo Province, in southern Bulgaria.

== Nomenclature ==
Krepost (Bulgarian: Крепост) is named after the Bulgarian word of the same name, meaning keep or fort.
