= Chernogorovo, Haskovo Province =

Chernogorovo
- Village
- Location in Bulgaria
- Coordinates: 42°01′45″N 25°39′05″E
- Country: Bulgaria
- Province: Haskovo Province
- Municipality: Dimitrovgrad
- Time zone: UTC+2 (EET)
  - Summer (DST): UTC+3 (EEST)

Chernogorovo (Bulgarian : Черногорово) is a village in the municipality of Dimitrovgrad, in Haskovo Province, in southern Bulgaria.

Etymology

The name 'Chernogorovo' is derived from a compact word composed of 'cherno'(черно) meaning black and 'gora'(гора) meaning forest, followed by the suffix -ovo (ово), which is a common naming suffix for places in Bulgarian.
