= Osogovo =

Mountain range and ski resort between Bulgaria and North Macedonia

Coordinates: 42°9′30″N 22°31′0″E

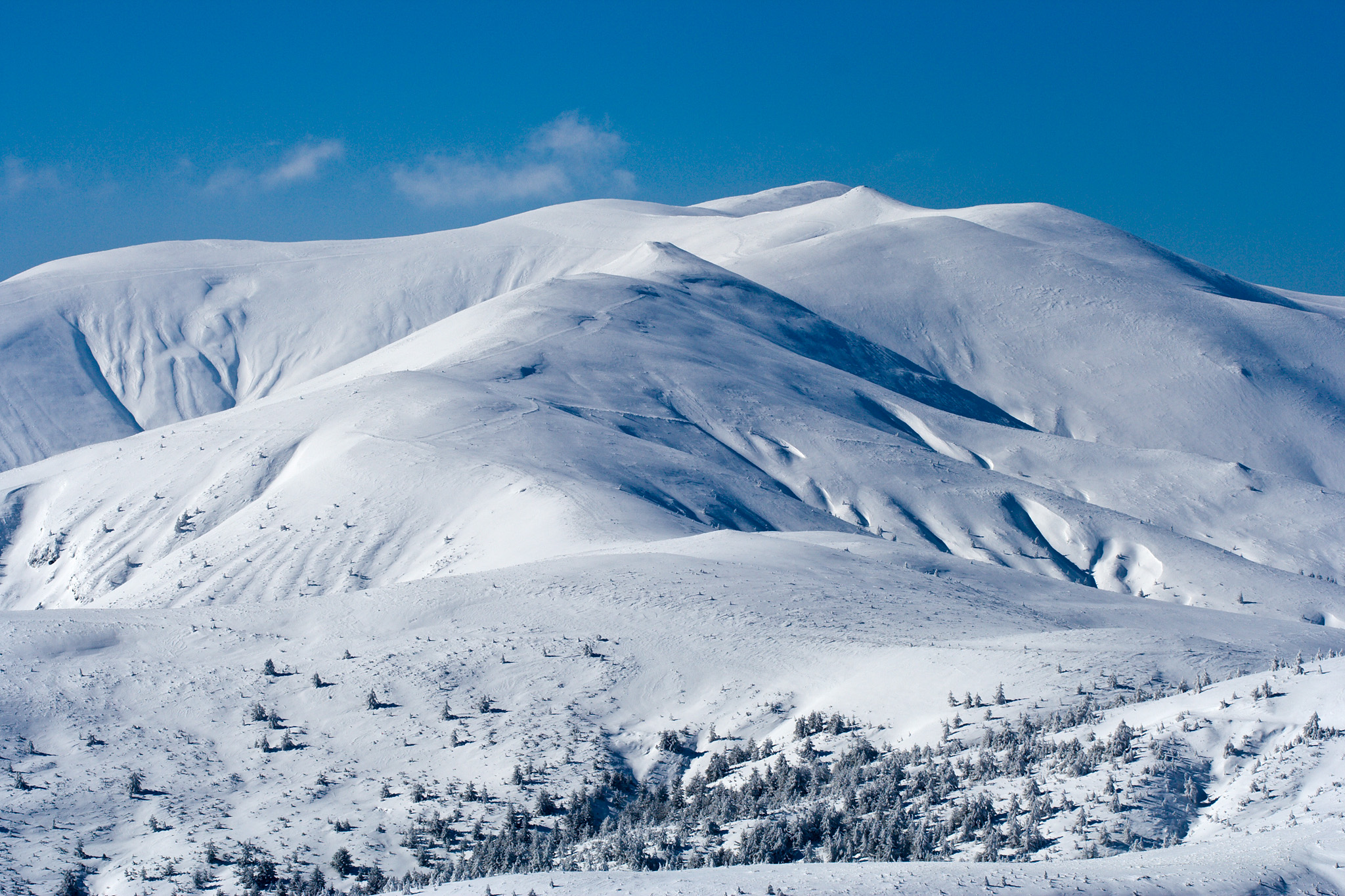
Ruen peak from the Bulgarian side of Osogovo.

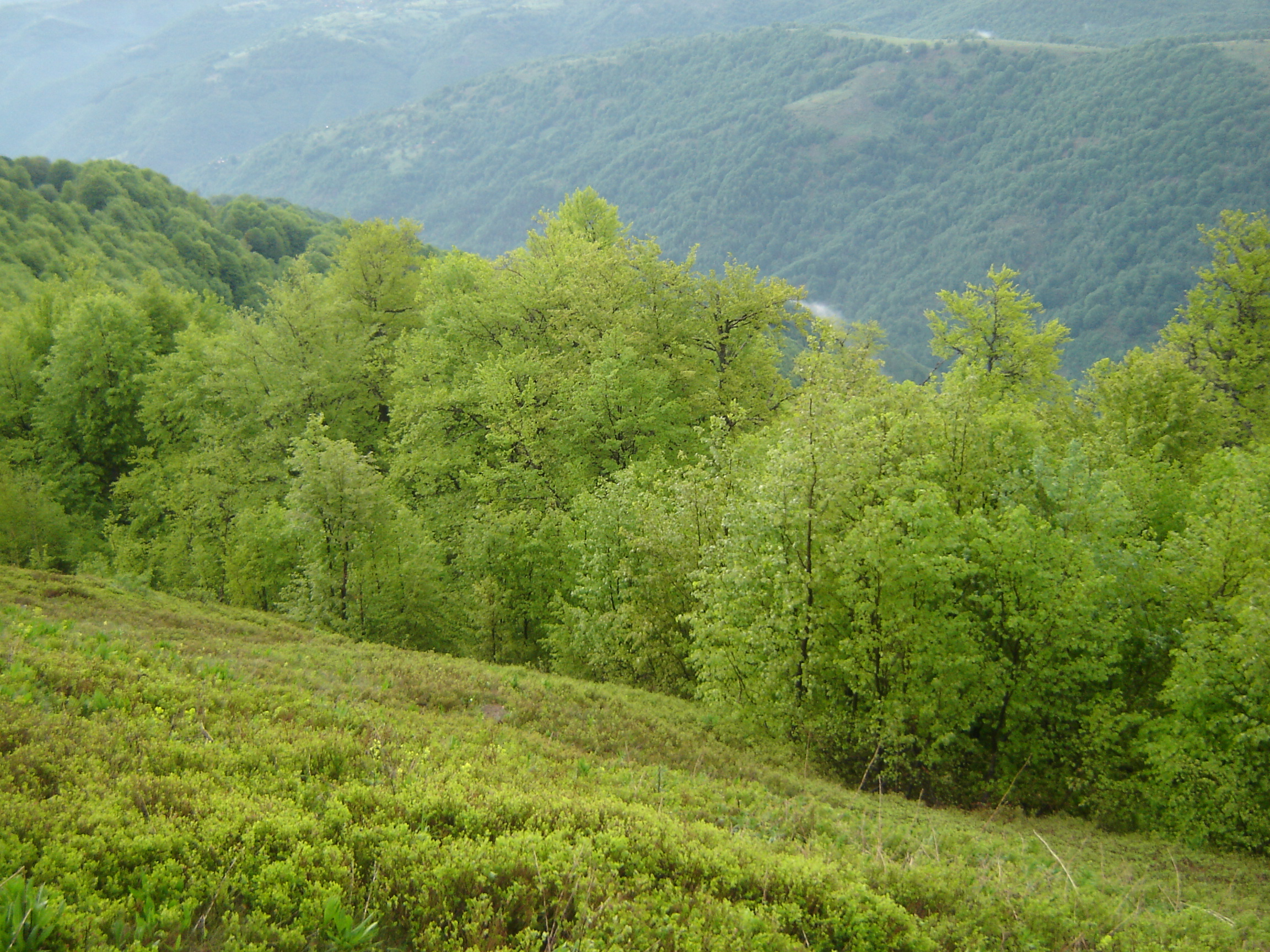
Springtime on the Macedonian side of Osogovo.

Osogovo (Bulgarian/Macedonian: Осогово), or Osogovska Planina or Osogovski Planini (Осоговска Планина or Осоговски Планини), is a mountain range and ski resort between the south-western part of Bulgaria (Kyustendil Province) and the north-eastern part of North Macedonia (Kočani and Kriva Palanka municipalities). Osogovo Monastery is situated on the mountain.

== Description ==
The range is about 110 km (68.35 mi) long and 50 km (31.07 mi) wide, the highest peak being Ruen (Руен) at 2251 m, which constitutes the main orthographic knot on the very border between Bulgaria and North Macedonia. The steepest slope is in the west, stretching down from Carev Vrv (Царев Врв; "Tsar's Peak"). It is the northernmost and highest part of the Osogovo-Belasica group and is situated between the Kyustendil and Kamenitsa Valleys, Dobro pole and Bregalnica and Kriva Reka river valleys. The western slopes are steep and the south-eastern ones are slant. The mountain itself is a granite massif of crystal rocks. It has a prominent volcanic relief made of conic peaks and volcanic tuff and is rich in polymetal ores.

== Etymology ==
There are many legends about the origin of name Osogovo, but the most famous one is that the area was briefly settled by Transylvanian Saxons miners who were mining gold and silver in the region in the past. According to this legend, the name originates from the Old Germanic words "osso" (god) and "gov" (place) which means "a divine place". Osogovo Bay in Livingston Island in the South Shetland Islands, Antarctica is named after Osogovo.

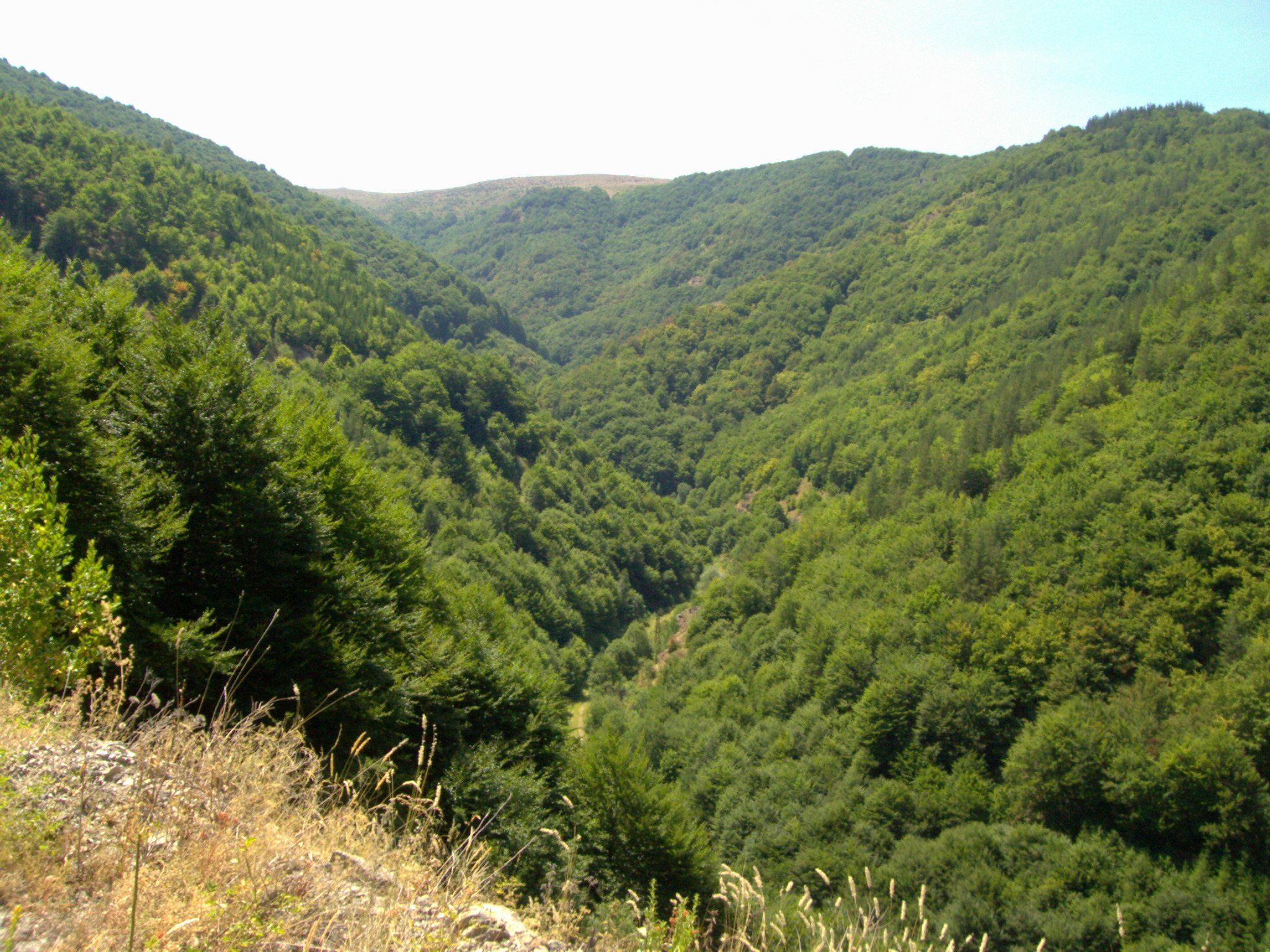
Osogovo in Bulgaria

== Environment ==
The flora distinguishes vertical coverage: an under-mountainous zone up to 1000 m where trees like oak, elm, hornbeam, ash, hazel and others can be found; a mountainous zone (1000–1800 m) covered mostly with beech trees; and a sub-alpine zone covered with grass pastures and bushes of juniper trees. The mountain rivers and streams are a natural habitat for the barbell, the chub and the mountain trout. Deciduous and coniferous forests dominate. The area is inhabited by the rare Alpine Newt. The nature and climate conditions allow for all-year tourism. Important towns at the foot of Osogovo are Kyustendil to the northeast in Bulgaria and Kočani and Kriva Palanka to the west and southwest in North Macedonia.

=== Important Bird Area ===
A 7,000 ha tract of the mountains has been designated an Important Bird Area (IBA) by BirdLife International because it supports a population of lanner falcons.
