= Skobelevo, Haskovo Province =

Skobelevo
- Village
- Location in Bulgaria
- Coordinates: 42.095°N 25.367°E
- Country: Bulgaria
- Province: Haskovo Province
- Municipality: Dimitrovgrad
- Time zone: UTC+2 (EET)
  - Summer (DST): UTC+3 (EEST)

Skobelevo is a village in the municipality of Dimitrovgrad, in Haskovo Province, in southern Bulgaria.
