= Elisabeth Krumme =

German lawyer and criminal judge

Elisabeth Krumme (6 June 1897 in Bromberg (now Bydgoszcz)–11 February 1984) was a German lawyer and criminal judge at the Federal Court of Justice in Karlsruhe. Krumme was the first woman among the 30 judges in the newly created federal court.
