= Krumm =

German family name

Krumm is a German surname derived from the nickname meaning "crooked". It has an Amercanized or Ashkenazi Jewish form *Krum. Notable people with the surname include:

- Al Krumm (1865–1937), Major League Baseball pitcher
- Franz Krumm (1909–1943), German footballer
- Michael Krumm (born 1970), German auto racing driver
- Philip Krumm (born 1941), American composer
- Piret Krumm (born 1989), Estonian actress, singer, and comedian
- Tracy Krumm, American textile artist

== Compound surnames ==
- Arnold Krumm-Heller (1876–1949), German doctor, occultist, and Rosicrucian
- Kimiko Date Krumm, Japanese tennis player

== See also ==
- Krumme
