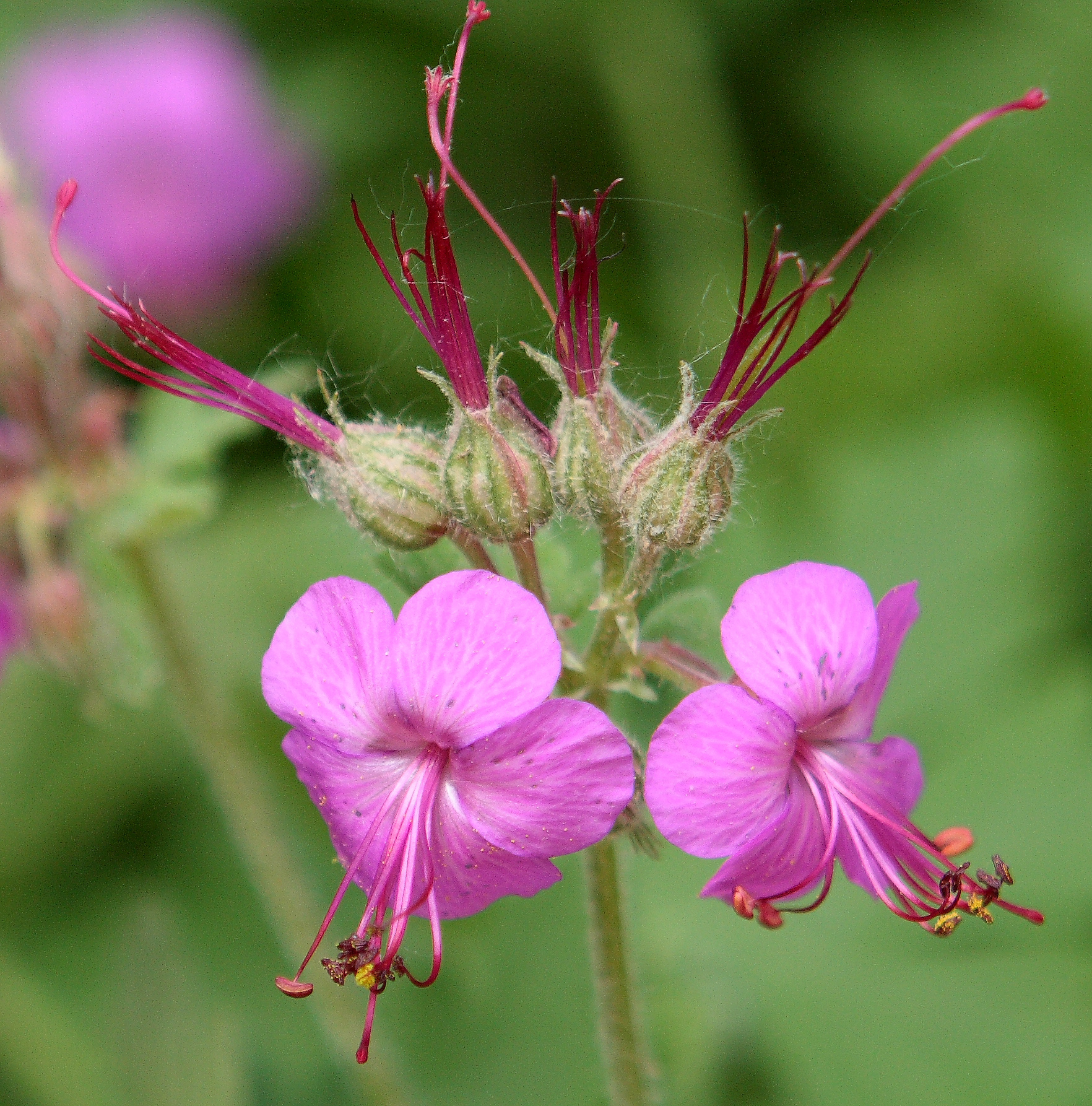

Scientific classification
- Kingdom: Plantae
- Clade: Embryophytes
- Clade: Tracheophytes
- Clade: Angiosperms
- Clade: Eudicots
- Clade: Rosids
- Order: Geraniales
- Family: Geraniaceae
- Genus: Geranium
- Species: G. macrorrhizum

Binomial name
- Geranium macrorrhizum L.

= Geranium macrorrhizum =

Species of flowering plant

Geranium macrorrhizum is a species of hardy flowering herbaceous perennial plant in the genus Geranium, family Geraniaceae. It is native to the south-eastern Alps and the Balkans. Its common names include bigroot geranium, Bulgarian geranium, and rock crane's-bill.

It has five-lobed (palmate) leaves that are aromatic when crushed, with pale pink flowers in summer. It is cultivated as an ornamental plant in temperate regions, where it is used as a flowering groundcover, with named cultivars selected for flower colors from white through pink to magenta. The cultivars 'Ingwersen's Variety' (pale pink) and 'White-ness' have gained the Royal Horticultural Society's Award of Garden Merit.

The plant has been used in traditional herbal medicine. One of the many components of the essential oil is the sesquiterpene ketone germacrone, which has been shown to have in vitro antimicrobial activity against the species Bacillus subtilis. An essential oil from it is also used in aromatherapy. In addition to oils, it contains flavonoids, sesquiterpenes, phenolic acids, pigments, vitamins, and mineral salts.

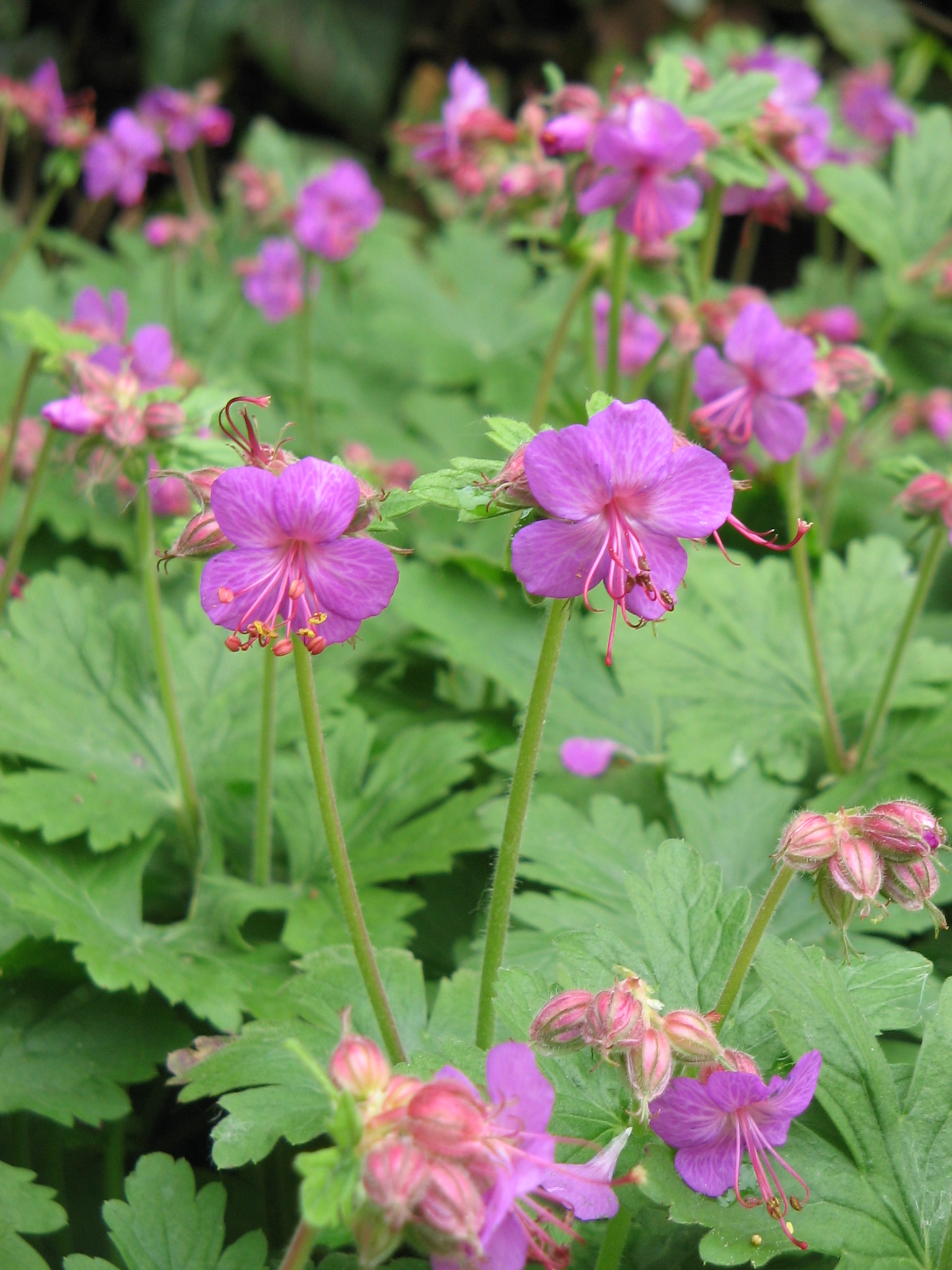

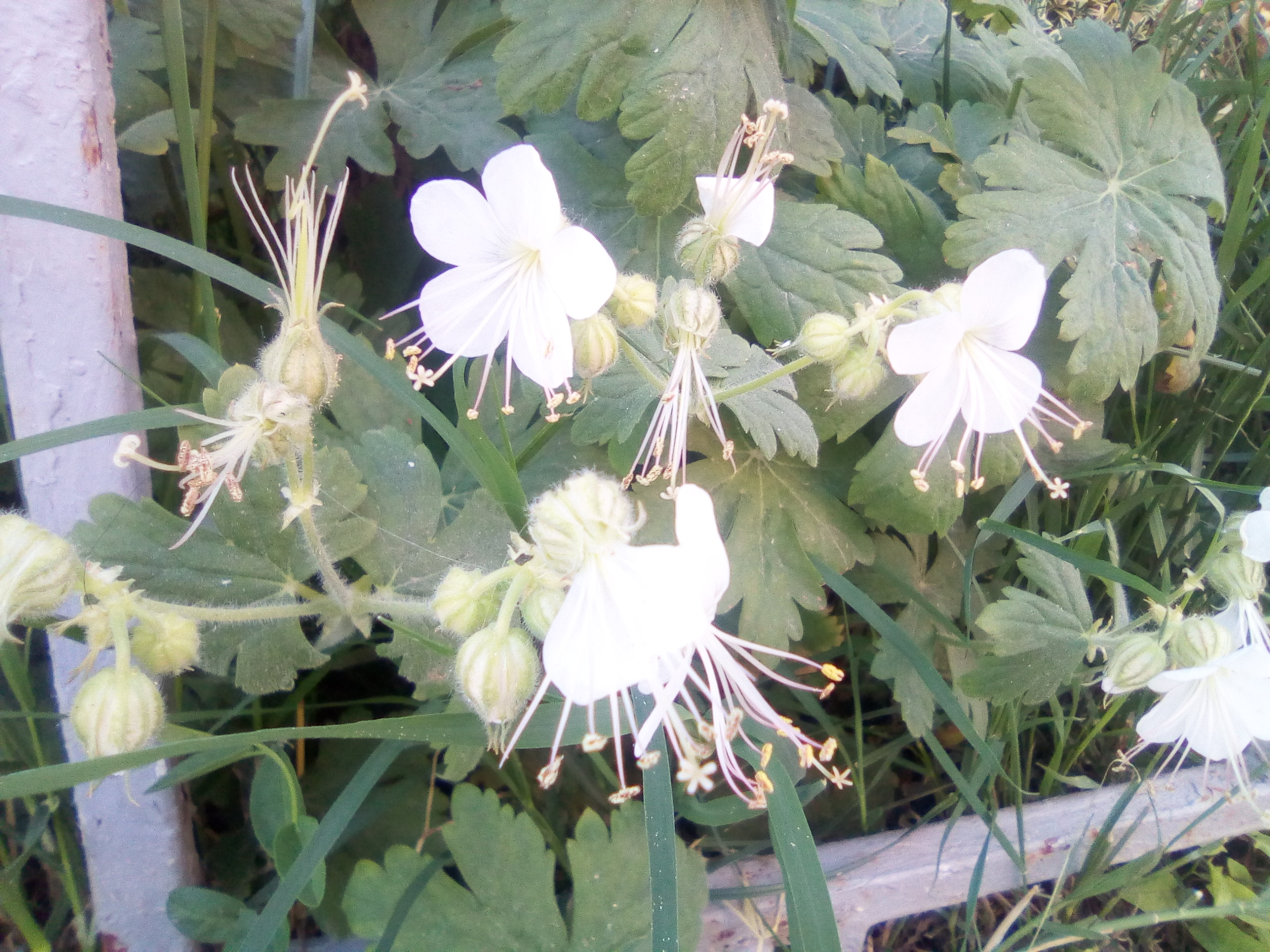
White-flowered variety
