= Mineralni Bani =

Mineralni Bani Минерални бани
- Location of Mineralni Bani
- Coordinates: 41°56′N 25°21′E
- Country: Bulgaria
- Provinces (Oblast): Haskovo

Government
  - Mayor: Orhan Myumyun
- Elevation: 270 m (890 ft)

Population (2016)
  - Total: ▼1,155
- Time zone: UTC+2 (EET)
  - Summer (DST): UTC+3 (EEST)
- Postal Code: 6343
- Area code: 03722

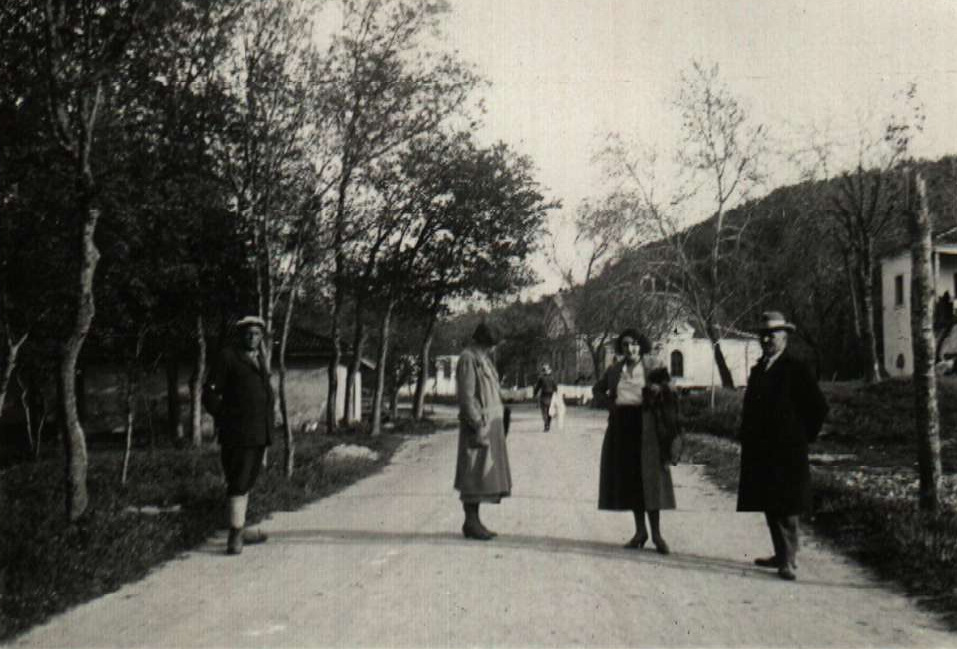
Mileralni Bani in 1940

Haskovski Mineralni Bani, officially known as Mineralni Bani (Bulgarian: Минерални бани, pronounced [minɛˈraɫni ˈbani]) is a spa village in central southern Bulgaria, part of Haskovo Province. It is the administrative centre of Mineralni Bani Municipality, which lies in the westernmost part of Haskovo Province. The village's name means "Haskovo Mineral Baths".

Mineralni Bani lies at the northern foot of the Eastern Rhodope Mountains, east of the Mechkovets ridge. Its former name was Meriçler.
