= Dimitrovgrad, Bulgaria =

Dimitrovgrad Димитровград
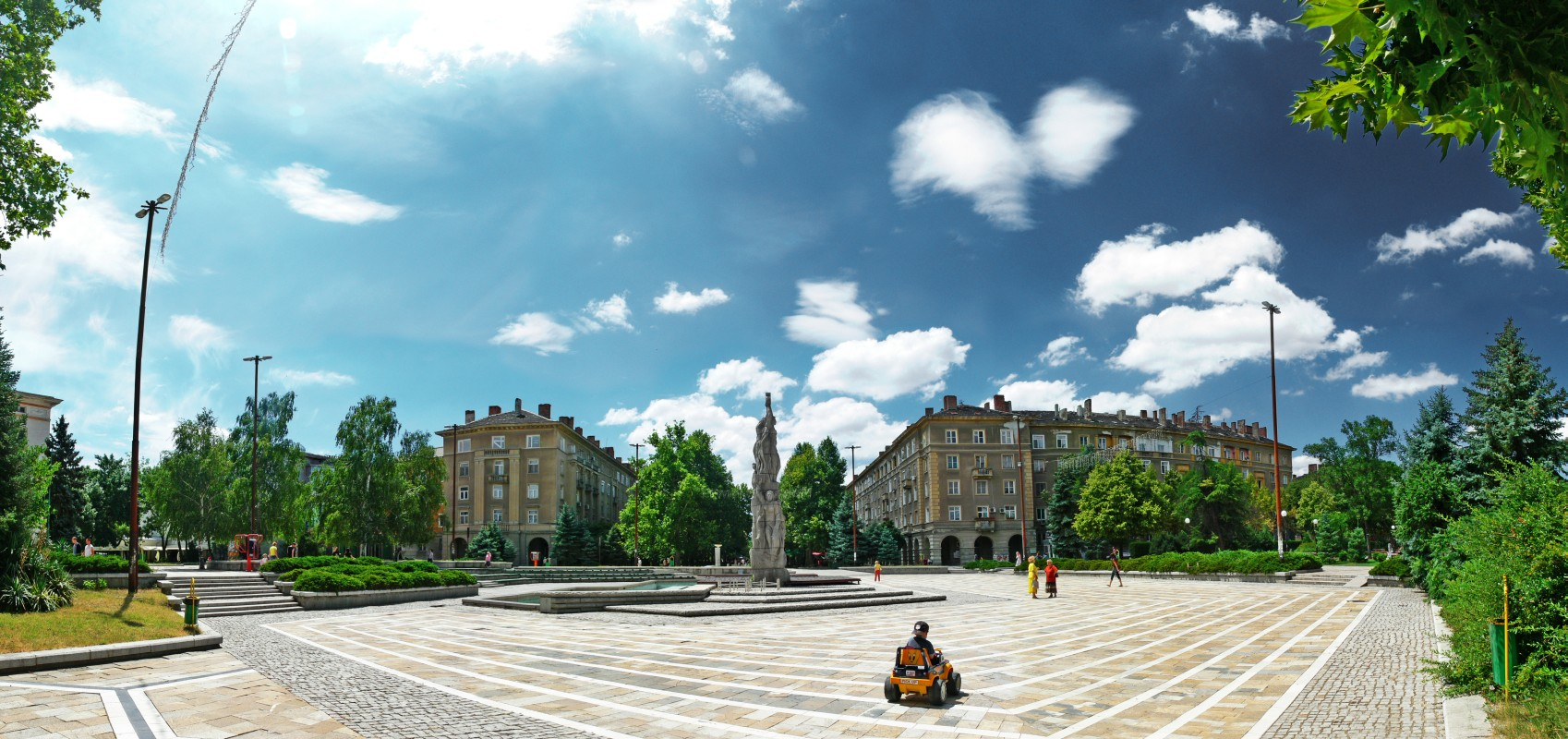

- Location of Dimitrovgrad, Bulgaria
- Coordinates: 42°3′N 25°36′E
- Country: Bulgaria
- Province (oblast): Haskovo

Government
  - Mayor: Ivo Dimov

Area
  - Total: 62.436 km^{2} (24.107 sq mi)
- Elevation: 125 m (410 ft)

Population (2021)
  - Total: 31,837
  - Density: 509.91/km^{2} (1,320.7/sq mi)
- Time zone: UTC+2 (EET)
  - Summer (DST): UTC+3 (EEST)
- Postal Code: 6400
- Area code: 0391
- Website: Official website

Dimitrovgrad (Bulgarian: Димитровград [diˈmitrovˌɡrat]) is a town in Haskovo Province, Bulgaria. It is along the Maritsa River in the Thrace region, close to the provincial capital, Haskovo. Dimitrovgrad is the administrative centre of Dimitrovgrad Municipality.

Founded in 1947, Dimitrovgrad is a planned city built by the People's Republic of Bulgaria following World War II. The recently established communist government designed the town as a socialist model city and a modern industrial center. Dimitrovgrad is named for the first communist leader of Bulgaria, Georgi Dimitrov.

== Geography ==
It is located 220 km from the capital Sofia and 15 km from the regional town of Haskovo. The nearest Bulgarian port is Burgas - 205 km, and the Greek port of Alexandroupoli on the Aegean Sea is about 190 km. through Makaza. Dimitrovgrad is a transport hub for Pan-European corridors 4, 8 and 9.

== History ==
Dimitrovgrad was planned by the People's Republic of Bulgaria, the communist state that came to power following World War II.

Construction of the city began on May 10, 1947, with most of the labor provided by youth volunteers who arrived from around Bulgaria. The establishment of Dimitrovgrad was officially announced on 2 September 1947, by Georgi Dimitrov, the leader of the People's Republic of Bulgaria. The three villages of Rakovski, Mariyno and Chernokonyovo were merged to form Dimitrovgrad. Construction of the town continued intensively for several more years.

The main practical reason behind the new city was to create a modern industrial centre for Bulgaria. there was also an ideological foundation for building it. The widespread destruction in Eastern Europe caused by World War II and the rise of Soviet-backed communist states in the region (known as the Eastern Bloc) led to numerous cities being built or rebuilt using new socialist planning styles. The original buildings in Dimitrovgrad were built in architectural styles popularly known as "Soviet Empire" or "Stalin Baroque", with facades of the earliest often monumental, with plinths, large columns and small decorative balconies. Over time, as the town expanded, buildings were built featuring less ornamentation in the newer Modernist architectural style.

In 1970, the first celebration of the national poetry festival 'Penio Penev' took place, and that tradition continues to the present. In 1980, the biennial Bulgarian theatrical poster was held for the first time. In 1987, the museum house Penio Penev was opened.

In 1992, shortly after the collapse of communism in Bulgaria, the monument to Georgi Dimitrov was removed by the authorities. This move proved very unpopular with the local residents, and in 2012 a plan was adopted by Dimitrovgrad city council to restore the statue and re-mount it by 2013. So far this has not happened.

== Tourism ==
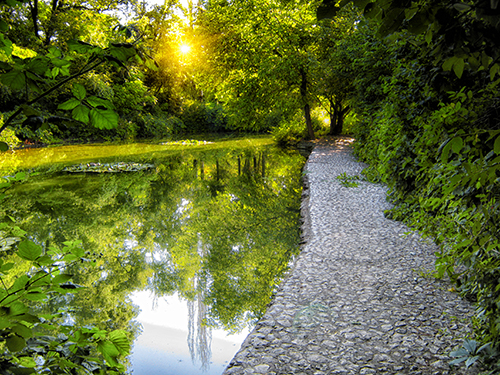
Penio Penev Park

Architecture in Dimitrovgrad is similar to that of the Roman Empire: It has spacious streets and large parks. It is one of the greenest cities in Bulgaria. There are three large parks with about 15 lakes, dozens of species of rare trees, shrubs and flowers, sculptures, gazebos and fountains. The town is also home to the People's Astronomical Observatory and Planetarium "Giordano Bruno". This is the first planetarium and second observatory (after the one in Stara Zagora) in Bulgaria

== Population ==
The population of Dimitrovgrad during the first decade after its foundation averaged about 34,000. In the following decades it started growing, mostly because of migrants from rural areas, reaching its peak between 1985 and 1992, when it exceeded 50,000. Since then, particularly during the 1990s, the population declined rapidly due to the poor economic situation in the region that led to a new migration to the country's capital, Sofia, and abroad.

== Notable people ==
- Atanas Kapralov, poet
- Nadezhda Aleksieva (b. 1969), biathlete
- Krassimira Banova, basketball player, European champion
- Atanas Vishanov, artist
- Vasil Gyuzelev, professor, historian
- Joanna Kristeva, author, psychologist
- Doncho Donev, football player
- Naiden Klinchev, musician
- Vanya Kostova, singer
- Duet Mania, singers
- Hristo Markov, world and Olympic champion in triple jump, athletics
- Zdravko Neychev, artist
- Rumen Radev, President of the Republic of Bulgaria (2017–26), Prime Minister (2026-present)
- Vezhdi Rashidov, artist, Minister of Culture (2009–13, 2014–17)
- Krassimir Rusev, chess player
- Vasil Sgurev, academician, cybernetician
- Elin Topuzakov, football player
- Petko Churchuliev, artist
- Gergana, Bulgarian pop-folk singer
- Vladislav Panev, politician and economist
- Kristiyan Oenfoefoe Teodoshev, magic maker

== Twin towns – sister cities ==
Dimitrovgrad is twinned with:

- Blida, Algeria
- Darkhan, Mongolia
- Dimitrovgrad, Russia
- Eisenhüttenstadt, Germany
- Grosseto, Italy
- Jiaojiang (Taizhou), China
- Kalamaria, Greece
- Kazincbarcika, Hungary
- Nowa Huta (Kraków), Poland
- Pivdenne, Ukraine
