= Perperek (river) =

Location
- Country: Bulgaria

Physical characteristics
- Source
  - location: Chukata Ridge, Rhodope Mountains
  - coordinates: 41°46′10.92″N 25°15′47.88″E
  - elevation: 709 m (2,326 ft)
- Mouth
  - location: Arda→ Maritsa→ Aegean Sea
  - coordinates: 41°39′36″N 25°31′17.04″E
  - elevation: 227 m (745 ft)
- Length: 44 km (27 mi)
- Basin size: 220 km^{2} (85 sq mi)

The Perperek (Bulgarian: Перперек) is a 44 km long river in southern Bulgaria, a left tributary of the Arda of the Maritsa drainage.

== Geography ==
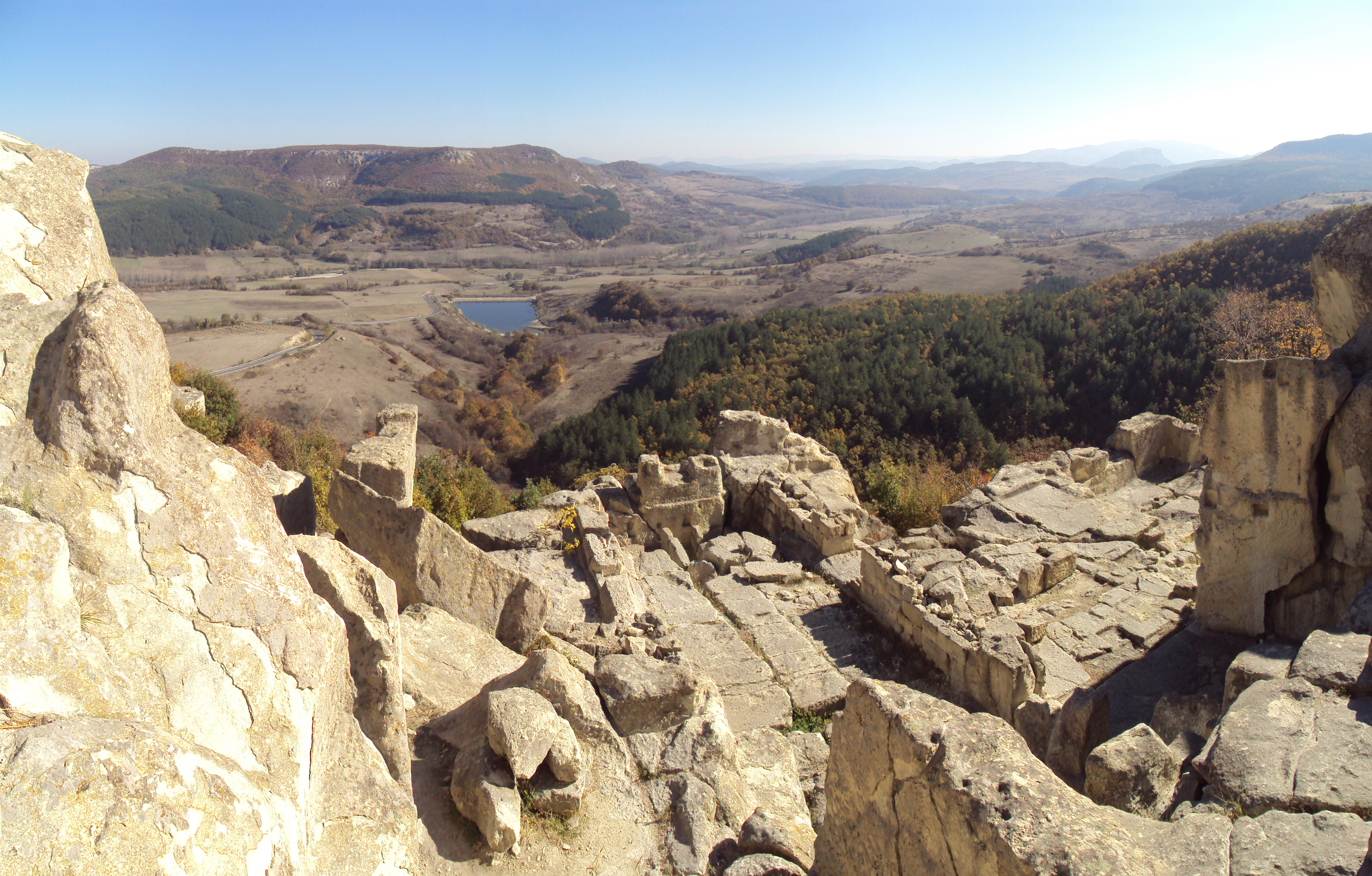
The ruins of Perperikon over the river valley

The river takes its source under the name Karakush dere at an altitude of 709 m on the southwestern slopes of the Chukata Ridge of the eastern Rhodope Mountains, about one kilometer from the village of Cherna Niva. Until the village of Perperek it flows in southeastern direction in a wide sparsely forested. Downstream from the village the river takes a large bend to the southwest. Shortly before flowing into the Studen Kladenets Reservoir on the Arda at an altitude of 227 m, the river forms a gorge between the elevations of Kartalkaya (563 m) to the west and Yumrukkaya (587 m) to the east, which is now almost flooded by the reservoir. It drains the ridges of Chukata and Kayadzhik.

Its drainage basin covers a territory of 220 km^{2}, or 3.8% of the Arda's total. The river has predominantly rain feed. The average annual flow at the village of Chiflik is 2.2 m^{3}/s.

== Settlements and economy ==
The Perperek flows entirely in Kardzhali Province. There are 14 villages along its course — Daskalovo, Yabalcheni, Chernoochene and Barza Reka in Chernoochene Municipality, and Tri Mogili, Stremovo, Lyulyakovo, Gorna krepost, Dolna krepost, Murgovo, Chiflik, Madrets, Perperek and Svatbare in Kardzhali Municipality. Its waters are utilized for irrigation.

A 3 km stretch of the third class III-507 road Haskovo–Most–Kardzhali follows its valley between Perperek and Madrets. Along the gorge in its lower course runs a section of railway line No. 4 Ruse–Stara Zagora–Podkova served by the Bulgarian State Railways.

Between the villages of Gorna Krepost and Dolna Krepost are located the ruins of the ancient Thracian city and later medieval fortress of Perperikon.
