= Perperek =

Perperek may refer to:

- Perperek (river), a river in southern Bulgaria
- Perperek (village), a village in Kardzhali Province, Bulgaria
- Perperek Knoll, a peak in the South Shetland Islands, Antarctica
