= Arena Arda =

Football stadium in Kardzhali, Bulgaria

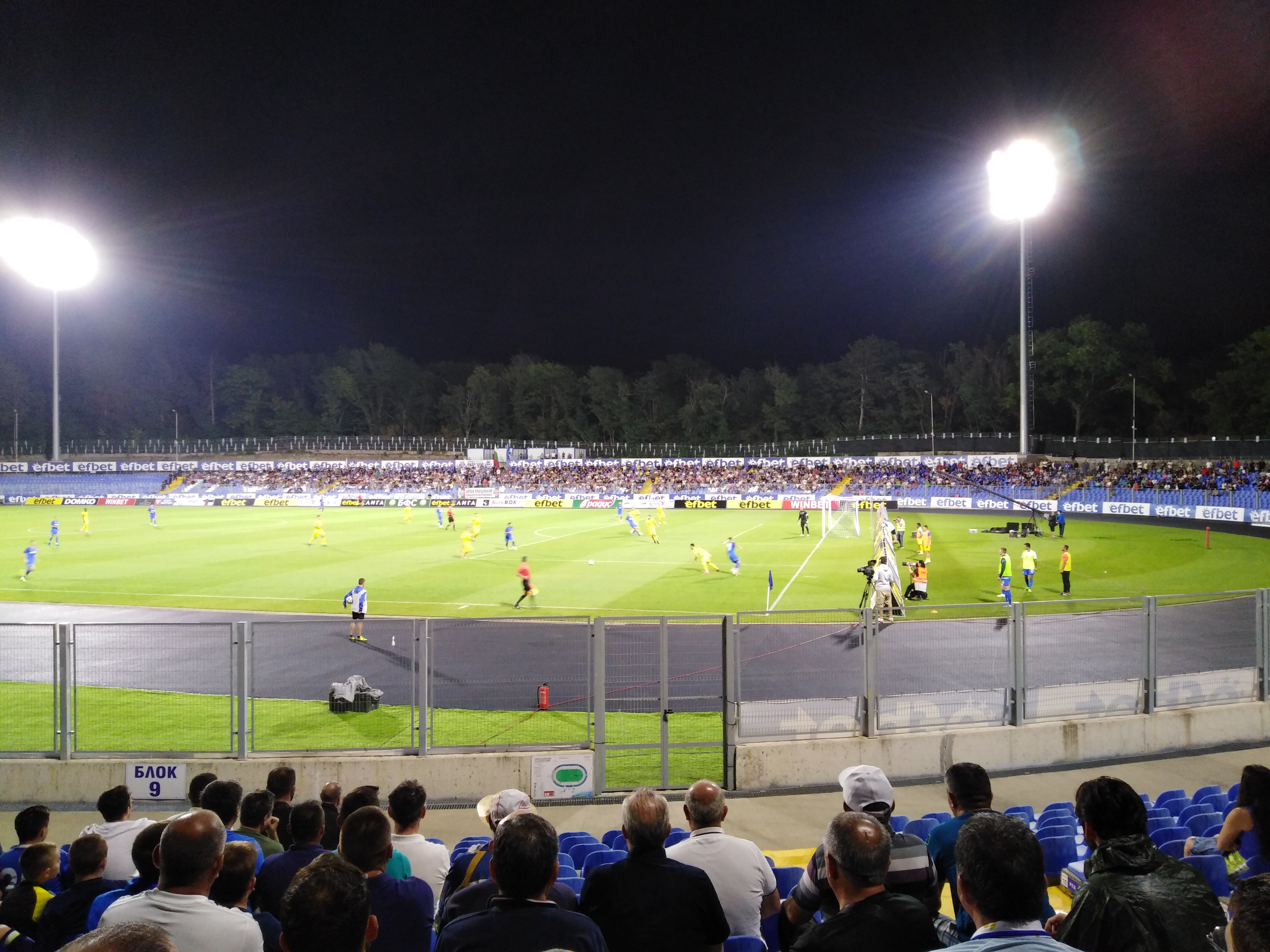
- Interactive map of Arena Arda
- Former names: Druzhba Stadium (1963–2018)
- Address: 6600 Kardzhali, 36 "Belomorski" Blvd.
- Location: Kardzhali, Bulgaria
- Coordinates: 41°38′28.3″N 25°22′41.0″E
- Owner: Kardzhali Municipality
- Operator: Arda Kardzhali
- Capacity: 11,114
- Surface: Grass
- Scoreboard: 9 x 6 m digital
- Record attendance: 30,000 (Levski Sofia v Botev Plovdiv, 2 May 1984)
- Field size: 105 x 68 m

Construction
- Built: 1961–1963
- Opened: 1963; 63 years ago
- Renovated: 2018, 2020

Tenant
- Arda Kardzhali (1963–present)

Arena Arda is a football stadium in Kardzhali, Bulgaria, and the home ground of Arda Kardzhali.

== History ==
The stadium was constructed and opened in the early 1960s under the name "Druzhba". At the time of its official inauguration it was among the most modern stadiums in the country. It is located in Recreation and Culture Park (better known as Prostor Park).

The stadium had a football pitch sized 105 x 68 m, an Olympic track and field in accordance with all international requirements, a media booth, and 4 main entrances. Its first renovation was carried out in the early 1980s when it became among the first stadiums in Bulgaria equipped with individual plastic seats. However this reduced its capacity to about 15,000.

During Bulgaria's economic downturn in the 1990s the overall condition of the stadium began to deteriorate due to lack of adequate funding and maintenance. By 2010 it had fallen into despair and no longer met the basic requirements for hosting football games. In the summer of 2011 some repair works were carried out on "Sector A" and the football pitch. However, they were inadequate to meet the standards required to hosting games even in the third-level football league and consequently the stadium's license was withdrawn. That forced Arda Kardzhali to host their football matches in Ardino and Perperek.

== Renovation ==
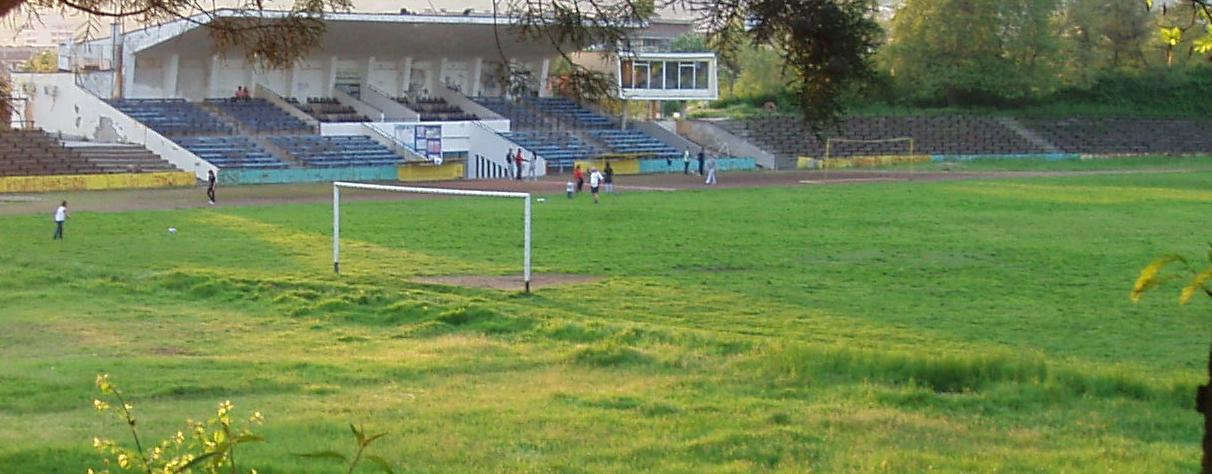
The stadium prior to the renovation.

In 2014 negotiations began to repair the stadium and bring it up to the requirements of the BFU for hosting football matches. A complete overhaul financed by the Ministry of Youth and Sports with BGN 1 786 888 commenced in January 2015. The repair works were carried out in several stages.

During the first stage the football pitch was equipped with a new drainage and automatic irrigation system. The concrete base of the stands was completely replaced and new 5500 plastic seats were installed on the east and west stands. Additionally a box for the away supporters was installed on the north stand. The administrative building which also hosts the changing rooms of both the home and away teams was completely overhauled.

After these improvements, in the beginning of 2017 the stadium regained its license, and Arda returned to hosting its home games on Druzhba Stadium after nearly a five-year long hiatus. On July 3, 2017 Arda held its first training session on the renovated stadium, and on August 5 the first match against Dimitrovgrad took place. In the end of September of the same year the plastic seats in the covered central section of "Sector A" were replaced with higher-class leather seats, thereby establishing a VIP lounge.

During the second phase of the renovation which was carried out in 2018 the remaining plastic seats were installed bringing the total stadium capacity to 15,000. The track resurfacing was also completed.

During the third phase of the renovation a brand new LED floodlights system and a 9 x 6 meters full-colour digital LED scoreboard were installed. The irrigation system, drainage, and grass surface of the pitch have also been renewed. In the months ahead a canopy for the east stands and a new training ground with artificial grass surface at the location of a previously existing dirt court located nearby will also be built.

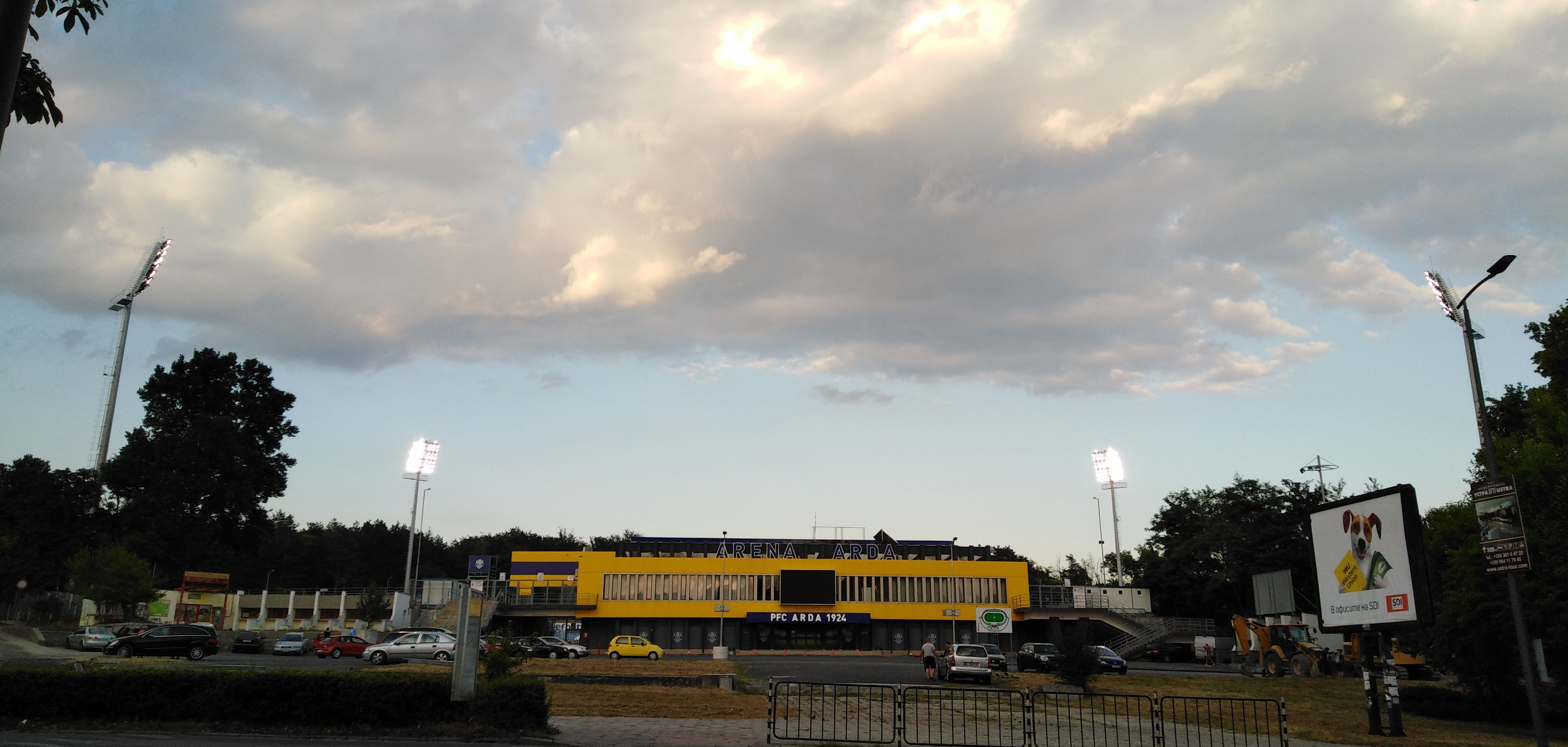

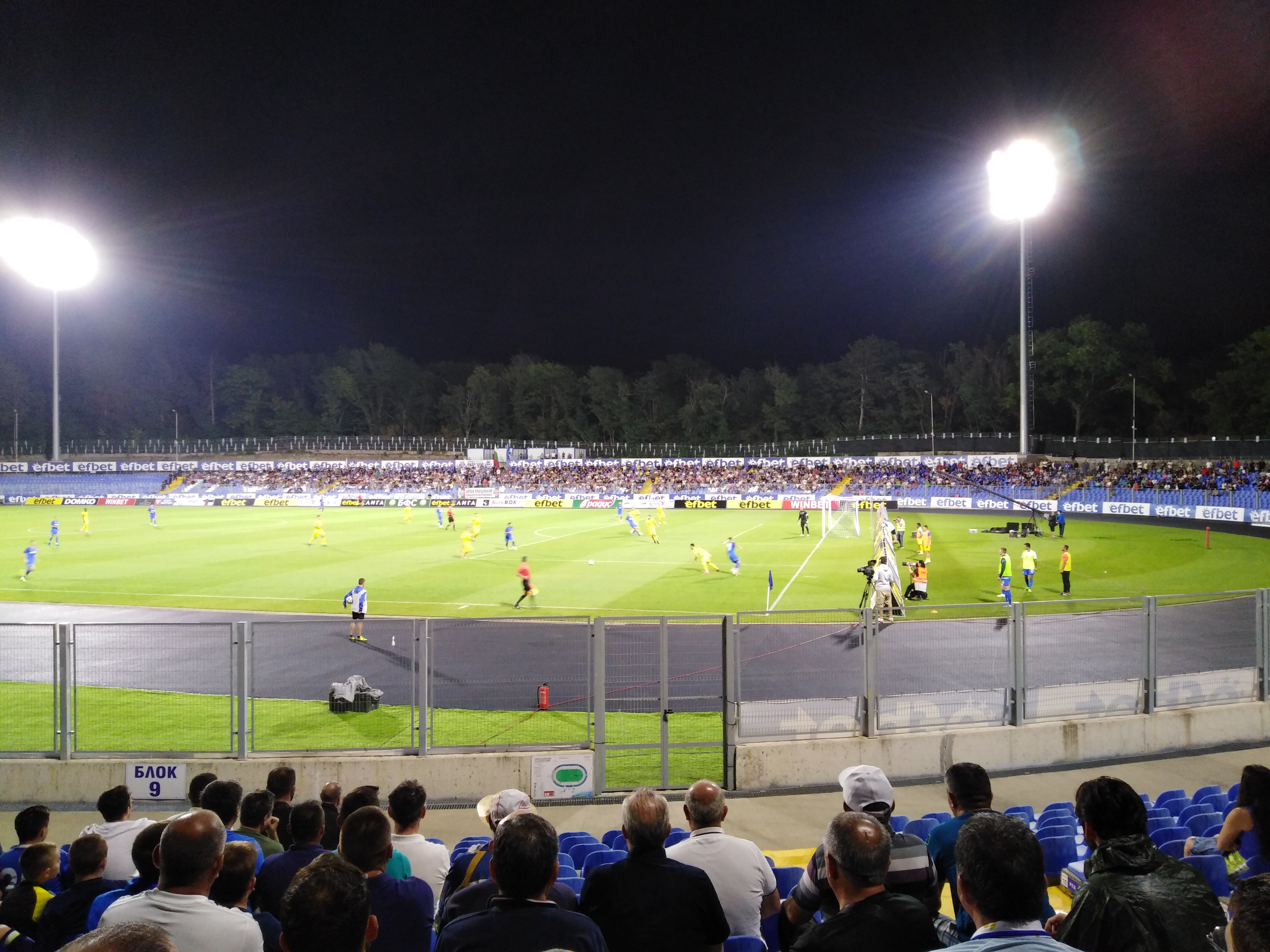

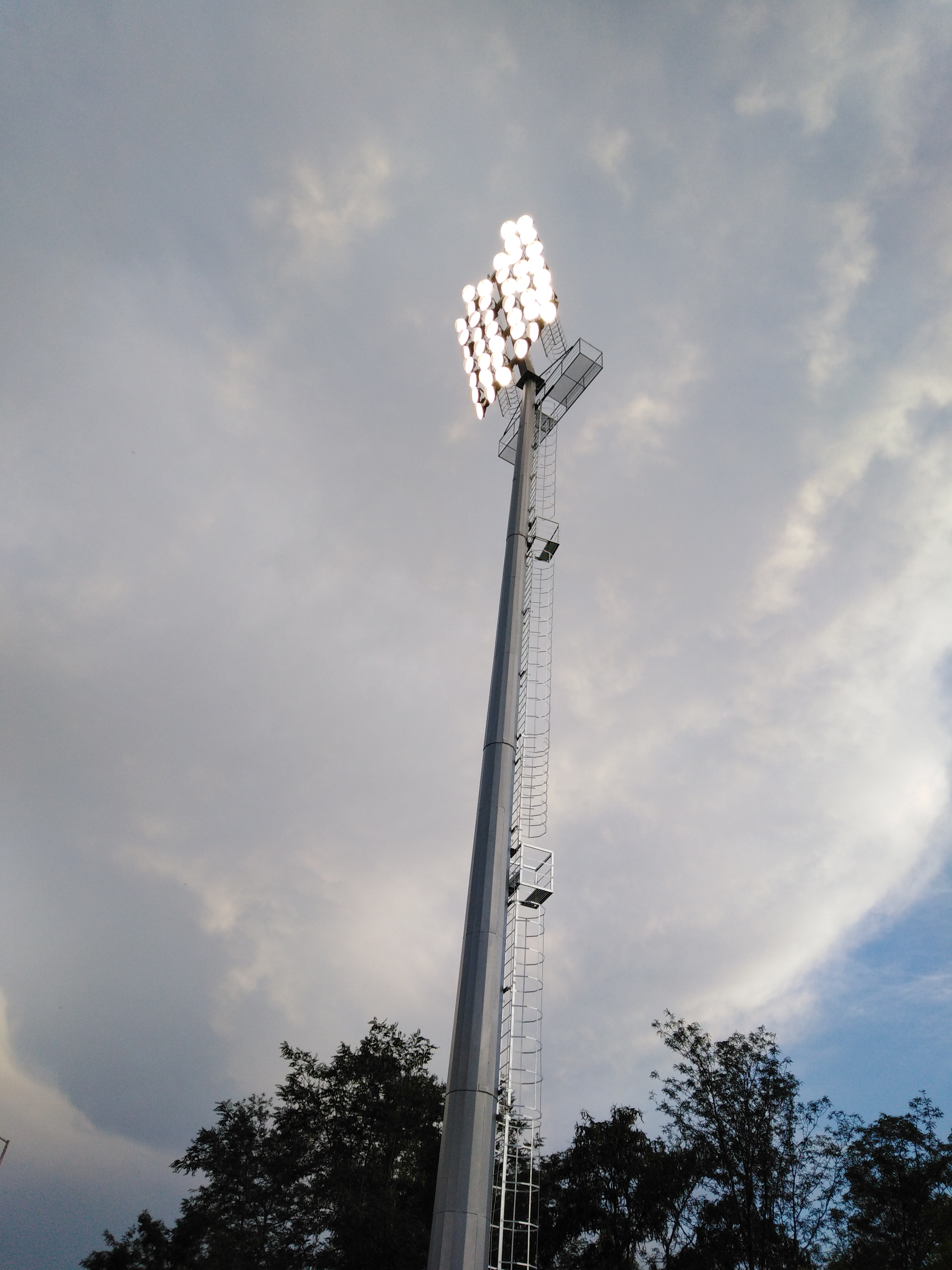

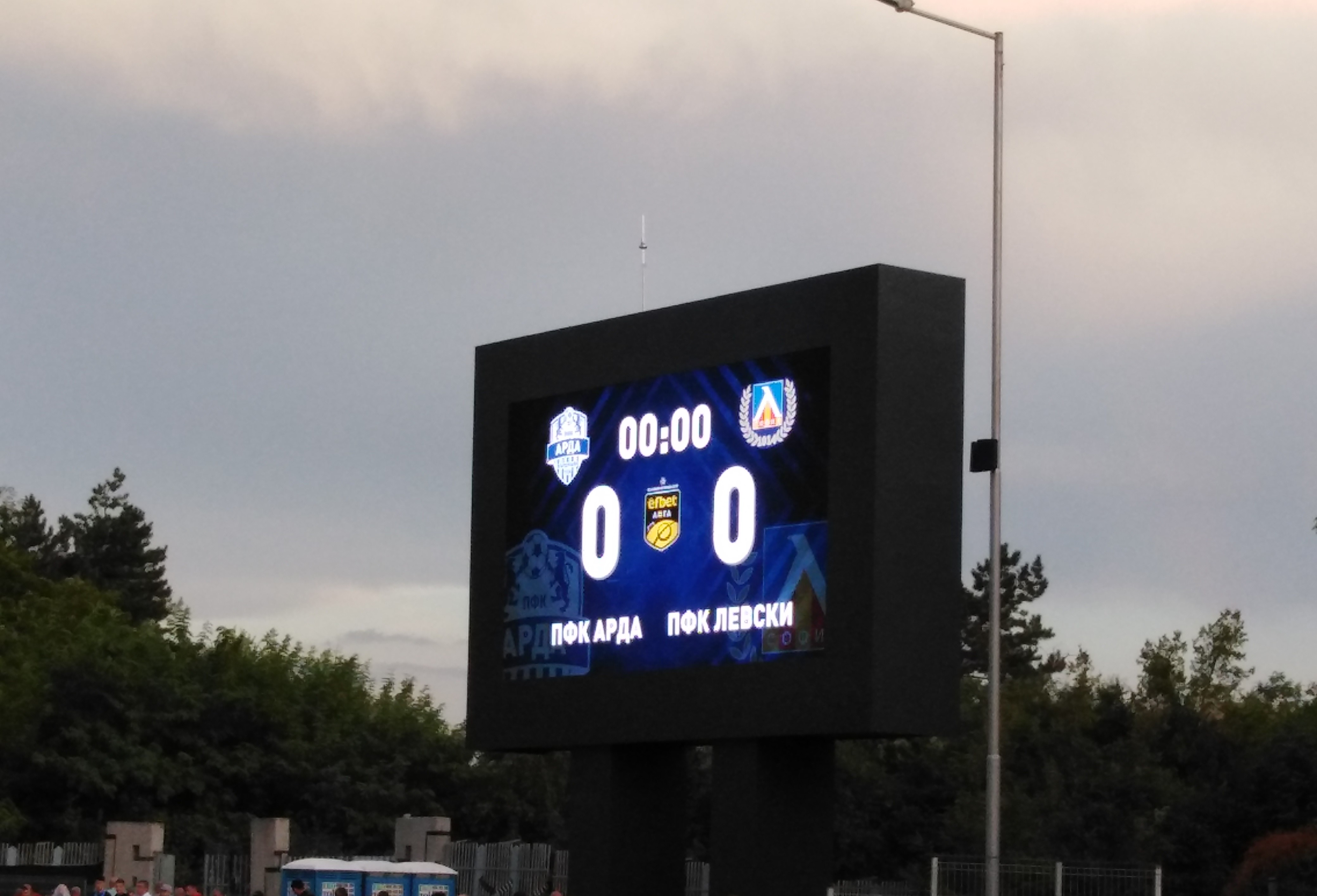

== Records ==
The highest attendance of a football match, estimated 30,000 spectators, was recorded in 1984 during the Cup of Bulgaria final held between Levski Sofia and Botev Plovdiv.

== Transport ==
The stadium is located about 1.2 kilometers north of the intercity Bus Station, and about 1.9 kilometers northwest from the Train Station. The stadium has limited parking facilities for supporters.
