= Tri Mogili =

Tri Mogili (Bulgarian: Три могили) may refer to the following places in Bulgaria:

- Tri Mogili, Kardzhali Province
- Tri Mogili, Plovdiv Province
