= Nikolay Ovcharov =

Bulgarian archaeologist

- Николай Овчаров
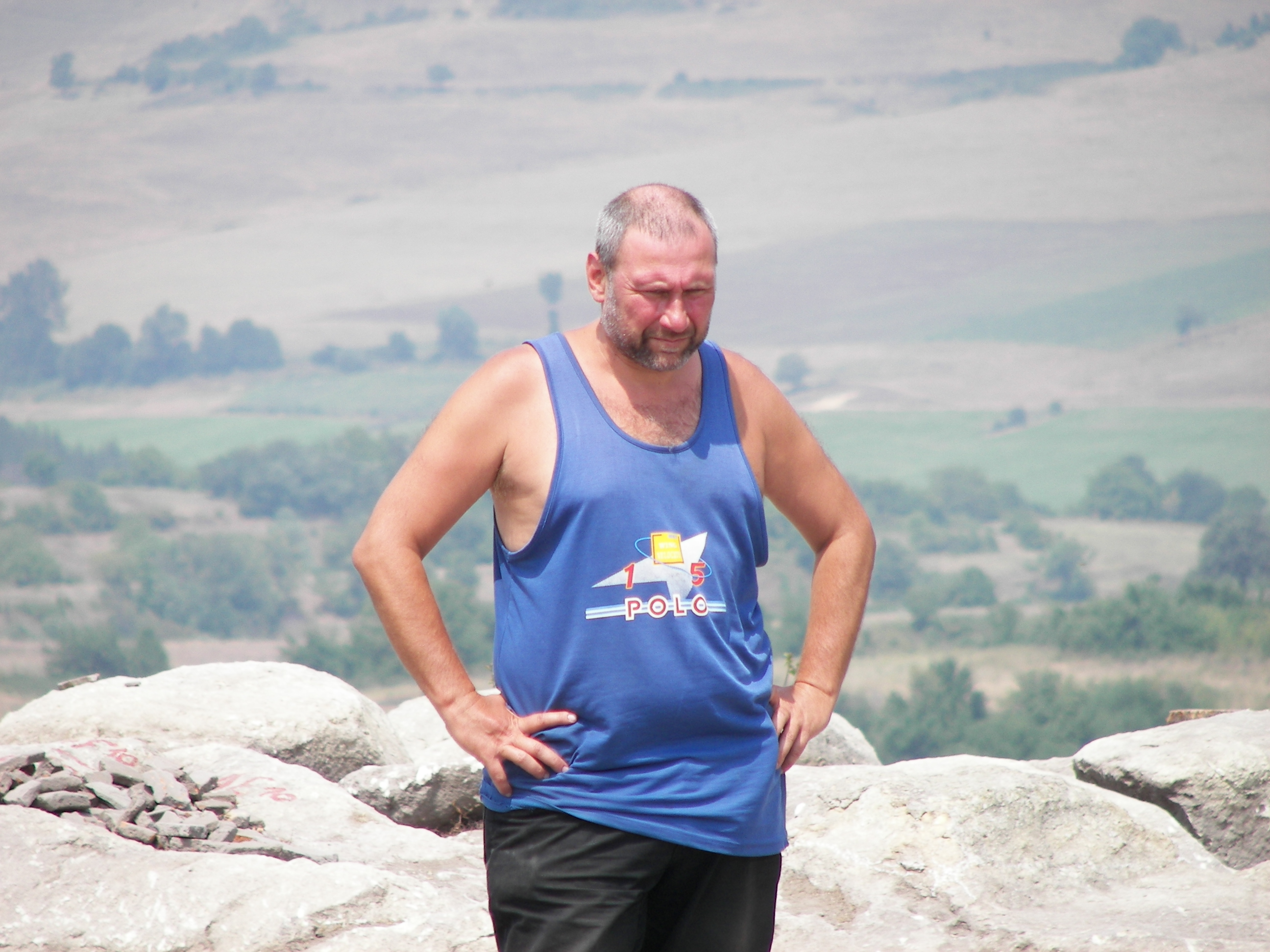
- Born: Nikolay Dimitrov Ovcharov; 19 July 1957 (age 69); Veliko Tarnovo, Bulgaria
- Education: Sofia University
- Known for: Archaeological work on Perperikon and Tatul; Historical and archaeological research
- Spouse: Irina Ovcharova
- Parents: Dimitar Ovcharov (father); Mariya Ovcharova (mother)
- Awards: Order "Knight of the Order of Saints Cyril and Methodius"; Award named after Professor Alexander Fol for research in Traceology; Honorary citizen of Kardzhali, Zlatograd, Targovishte and Sofia; Distinction "Golden Age" by the Ministry of Culture of Bulgaria

Nikolay Ovcharov (Bulgarian: Николай Овчаров; born 19 July 1957) is a Bulgarian archaeologist and thracologist. He is known for his archaeological expeditions in Perperikon, a unique ancient Thracian city located in the eastern Rhodopes, as well as Tatul – the prehistoric surface tomb and sanctuary located near a village of the same name.

== Biography ==
Nikolay Ovcharov was born on 19 July 1957 in Veliko Tarnovo. graduated with a degree in History from Sofia University in 1981 and specialized in Archaeology and Traceology at the Bulgarian Academy of Sciences. Ovcharov holds a PhD and D.Sc. in History from the National Archaeological Institute and received a professorship from the International Slavic Institute, a Moscow-based university. In 2012, Ovcharov was awarded the title ‘academic’ form the Bulgarian Academy of Sciences.

=== Archaeological expeditions in Perperikon and Tatul ===
Ovcharov is principally known for his archaeological expeditions in Perperikon, a unique ancient Thracian city located in the eastern Rhodopes. Perperikon is considered to have been a famous sanctuary and oracular shrine dedicated to the worship of Dionysus, the Greek god of fertility, by the Bessi, an independent Thracian tribe.

In 2005, German scholars from the University of Heidelberg confirmed that the two rather small fragments discovered by Ovcharov in the Eastern Rhodopes mountains are written in the Minoan Linear A script from about 15th century BC. In August 2006, Ovcharov claimed that a stone tile dating allegedly to 5,000 BC contains some unknown writing. The tile is believed to have been unearthed in Bulgaria in the 1980s.

Ovcharov has also been credited for his archaeological expeditions in Tatul, a Thracian surface tomb located in southern Bulgaria. Tatul has been recognised as an exclusive religious centre in the region which according to Ovcharov was the site of the sanctuary and tomb of an influential Thracian leader who was deified after his death. Ovcharov has theorised Tatul to have been linked to the cult of Orpheus, a legendary musician and prophet in ancient Greek religion.

=== International archaeological and academic work ===
In conjunction with his work in Perperikon and Tatul, Ovcharov has led archaeological expeditions in Georgia, Greece, Montenegro, the Republic of North Macedonia, Russia, Serbia, and Turkey. Ovcharov has given numerous lectures in Bulgaria and abroad. Some of the universities that he has visited include the University of Illinois Chicago, Columbus State University, the Charles University in Prague, the Ghent University, the Ural University in Yekaterinburg, the University of Nicosia, the University of Athens, the Far Eastern Federal University of Vladivostok, and the Beijing Foreign Studies University. Ovcharov also teaches history in the New Bulgarian University and the Slavic University in Moscow.

Ovcharov is an accomplished scholar, and has over 68 published monographs and books, as well as 300 articles which have been published in Austria, Bulgaria, the Czech Republic, Germany, Greece, Italy, Kazakhstan, Malta, Moldova, Montenegro, the Netherlands, North Macedonia, Poland, Russia, Serbia, Ukraine, and the United States. From 2005 to 2018, Ovcharov wrote a weekend column focused on history, archaeology, and cultural tourism in Standart, a Bulgarian daily newspaper. In 2019, Ovcharov began writing for Trud, a Bulgarian daily newspaper, leading a weekend column focused on history and archaeology. From 2002 to 2007, Ovcharov was the host of 'The Holy Grail', a Bulgarian history television show produced by Evrokom, a Bulgarian television channel. The show received numerous awards and recognitions, including an award by the Eurasian Academy of Television and Radio, a Moscow-based film organisation.

=== Cultural work and achievements ===
In addition to his academic and archaeological work, Ovcharov is actively involved with developing cultural activities in Bulgaria. From 2014 to 2021, Ovcharov served as the lead advisor to the Minister of Culture of Bulgaria. From 2018 to 2019, Ovcharov organised the government-led initiative ‘Mission Bulgaria’ together with Professor Plamen Pavlov, a prominent Bulgarian historian. As part of the initiative, Ovcharov and Pavlov gave lectures exploring the history and culture of Bulgaria in universities and embassies across the globe, including in China, India, Russia, and Switzerland.

Ovcharov holds numerous awards and recognitions for his work in Bulgaria, including:

- In 2000, Ovcharov became an honorary citizen of Kardzhali, a town in southern Bulgaria.
- In 2009, Ovcharov received an award named after Professor Alexander Fol, a prominent Bulgarian historian, for his research in the field of Traceology.
- In 2010, Ovcharov was awarded the title of Knight of the Order of Saints Cyril and Methodius, the second highest order of Bulgaria awarded for merit in the fields of arts, science, education, and culture.
- In 2017, Ovcharov received the distinction ‘Golden Age’, a badge of honour awarded by the Ministry of Culture of Bulgaria.
- In 2017, Ovcharov became an honorary citizen of Zlatograd, a town in southern Bulgaria.
- In 2018, Ovcharov further became an honorary citizen of Targovishte, a town in northern Bulgaria, and of Sofia, the capital city of Bulgaria.
- In 2024, Ovcharov received the title of 'honorary professor' from the Academy of Economics in Svishtov.

== Work ==
- The graffiti drawings from the "Imaret Mosque" in Plovdiv as a source for the history of the Mediterranean in the 15th century. Sofia: BAS Publishing House, 1987, 101 pp. (Excavations and studies, XVIII).
- The Great Royal Palace in Veliki Preslav, I. Preslav Patriarchate in the 10th century. Sofia: "Agres" Publishing House, 1991. (together with Dimitar Ovcharov and Zh. Aladzhov).
- Shipping on the Bulgarian Black Sea coast XIV–XIX centuries. Sofia: University Publishing House "St. Kliment Ohridski", 1992, 175 p.
- A medieval monastery in the town of Kardjali - the center of the Ahridos episcopate XI-XIV centuries. Sofia: BAS Publishing House, 1992. (with D. Hadjieva) (Excavations and studies, XXIV).
- Ships and shipping in the Black Sea XIV–XIX centuries . Sofia: St. Kliment Ohridski University Press, 1993, 153 p.
- Studies on the Middle Ages and recent history of Vardar Macedonia. Sofia: University Publishing House "St. Kliment Ohridski", 1994, 165 p.
- History and archaeology of Vardar Macedonia in the 14th century. Sofia: University Publishing House "St. Kliment Ohridski", 1996.
- The victories of King Kaloyan (1197 – 1207). Bulgaria's historical choice between Orthodoxy and Catholicism. Sofia: TanNakRa Publishing House, 2000.
- Perperikon and surrounding fortresses in the Middle Ages. Fortress construction in the Eastern Rhodopes. Sofia: TanNakRa Publishing House, 2003, 112 pp. (together with D. Kojamanova).
- The Warrior Saints in Old Bulgarian Art. Legends and Reality. Sofia: Agato Publishers, 2003, 115 p.
- Ten pearls from the crown of Bulgaria, Sofia: Bulgarian Bestseller, 2005, 64 pp. ISBN 978-954-9308-68-6
- Perperikon. A civilization of the rock people. Sofia: Borina, 2005, 162 c. (the same in Bulgarian, French and German). ISBN 978-954-500-140-6
- Historical contributions to Old Bulgarian and Old Slavic epigraphy and literature . Sofia: Marin Drinov Academic Publishing House, 2006, 403 p.
- The stories of the Bulgarian Indiana Jones, Sofia: Standart, 2006, 160 pp. ISBN 978-954-90426-5-8
- The Medieval Bulgarian Empire, Plovdiv: Lettera, 2006, 168 pp. + 200 color illustrations, in Bulgarian, English, German. and fr. language. ISBN 978-954-516-676-1
- Chronicle of the Holy City of Perperikon, Sofia: Bulgarian Bestseller, 2006, 82 pp. ISBN 978-954-9308-87-7
- The Shortest History of Bulgaria, Plovdiv: Lettera, 2006, 72 pp. ISBN 978-954-516-582-5
- The sanctuary of Orpheus near the village of Tatul, Momchilgradsko, Varna: Slavena, 24 pp. ISBN 978-954-579-481-0
- The image and likeness. Aesthetics of the Image in Bulgarian Medieval Art, Sofia: Zahariy Stoyanov, 2007, 80 pp. ISBN 978-954-09-0007-0
- The discoveries of the Bulgarian Indiana Jones. Disappeared cities, forgotten temples, ancient writings, sunken ships, Sofia: Zahariy Stoyanov, 2008, 160 pp. ISBN 978-954-09-0185-5
- Archaeological Travels in Macedonia, Varna: Slavena, 2009, 93 pp. ISBN 978-954-579-791-0
- The cipher of Perperikon, Sofia: Standart, 2009, 64 p.
- An archaeologist travels around the world, Sofia: Ciela, 2010, 355 pp. ISBN 978-954-28-0785-8
- The necropolis of the late medieval settlement of Galitsa near the village of Nisovo, Rusensko . Varna: Slavena, 2010, (with Elena Vasileva)
- Tsar Ivan Shishman – traitor or saint . Sofia: Standart, 2010, 62 p.
- The Bulgarian epic of wine. History of wine in the Bulgarian lands, Sofia: Standart, 2011, 65 pp. ISBN 9789549457064
- Foretold of Perperikon, Sofia: Standart, 2011, 63 pp. ISBN 978-954-2934-03-5
- Orpheus - the oracle from Tatul, Sofia: Standart 2011, 64 pp. ISBN 978-954-2934-05-9
- Tsarstveniyat Tarnovgrad, Sofia: Standart, 2011, 64 pp. ISBN 978-954-2934-11-0
- Veliki Preslav - the capital of the Bulgarian Empire, Sofia: Standart, 2011, 65 pp. ISBN 978-954-2934-14-1
- Journey through countries of eagles and castles, Plovdiv: Hermes, 2012, 184 pp. ISBN 978-954-26-1097-7
- The seeker of the past discovers the world, Plovdiv: Hermes, 2013, 312 pp. ISBN 978-954-26-1258-2
- In Africa among lions and shadows of ancestors, Plovdiv: Hermes, 2014, 160 pp. ISBN 978-954-26-1377-0
- Russia begins from Kamchatka, Plovdiv: Hermes, 2015, 159 pp. ISBN 978-954-26-1513-2
- Archaeologist. From "Hosanna!" to "Crucify Him!" Plovdiv: Janet 45, 2015, 319 pp. ISBN 978-619-186-175-0
- Tsar Ivan Shishman. Defender of the Fatherland . Sofia: Zahariy Stoyanov, 2016, 157 p.
- King Kaloyan. The regimental commander. Sofia: Zahariy Stoyanov, 2017, 198 p.
- Tsar Ivan Alexander Asen. The peacemaker. Sofia: Faber, 2017, 136 p.
- Tsar Constantine Tychus Assen. The evil king . Sofia: Faber, 2017, 140 p.
- The sun sets over Angkor. A journey through the mysterious Indochina, Sofia: Hermes, 2017, 191 pp. ISBN 978-954-26-1694-8
- Cyprus. The Island of Aphrodite, Sofia: Hermes, 2018, 159 pp. ISBN 978-954-26-1806-5
- Temple of the Jaguar. A Journey into the Lost World of Mesoamerica. Sofia, 2019, 236 pp. "Faber" Publishing House, ISBN 978-619-00-1078-4
- Dracula. The Bulgarian version. Sofia 2020, 144 p., Market Pool Publishing House, ISBN 978-619-91188-2-5
- Boy. The King of Rhodope (with Pavlov Square). Varna, 2020, 71 p., Slavena Publishing House, ISBN 978-619-190-171-5
- Kokalyanski Urvich fortress and the late medieval monastery in it (with Filip Petrunov). Sofia, 2020, 159 p., "Unikart" Publishing House, ISBN 978-954-2953-99-9
- The end of the Second Bulgarian Kingdom and the fate of the Zlatograd region. Sofia, 2021, 144 p., "Unikart" Publishing House, ISBN 978-954-2953-00-5
- The Ancient and Medieval City of Perperikon (with Zdravko Dimitrov, Daniela Kojamanova, Konstantin Dochev, Dimitar Stoimenov and Nikolai Sharankov), Volume I. The Acropolis. Sofia, 2021, 554 p., "Unikart" Publishing House, ISBN 978-619-7629-04-0
- Christianity in the Zlatograd region. Varna, 2021, 71 p., Slavena Publishing House, ISBN 978-619-190-193-7
- From the holy Perperikon to the royal Tarnovgrad. 15 remarkable historical places in Bulgaria. Sofia, 2021, 32 p., "Unikart" Publishing House, ISBN 978-619-7629-02-6
- The Lords of Kren and their Treasures. The medieval history of Kazanlak. Sofia, 2022, 198 p., "Unikart" Publishing House, ISBN 978-619-7629-07-1
- The Svishtov fortress . Sofia, 2022, 225 p., "Unikart" Publishing House, ISBN 978-619-7629-13-2
- Illustrated history of medieval Bulgaria. Sofia, 2022, 121 p., ISBN 978-619-7629-12-5
- The medieval monastery "St. Equal Apostles Peter and Paul" in Veliko Tarnovo and its treasures. Sofia, 2023, 119 p., "Unikart" Publishing House, ISBN 978-619-7629-14-9
- Tsar Theodore Svetoslav and despot Aldimir from the great khan family of Terteroba. Sofia, 2023, 166 p., "Zachariy Stoyanov" Publishing House, ISBN 978-954-09-1709-2
- The Bolyar treasures of the medieval Missionis. Varna, 2023, 26 p., Slavena Publishing House, ISBN 978-619-190-241-5
- The fortified passage with a tower-well in Rusokastro and the building tradition in medieval Europe. Burgas, 2023, 192 p., Regional Historical Museum Burgas, ISBN 978-619-91678-8-5; Online edition ISBN 978-619-91678-9-2 (with M. Nikolov)
- The great rulers of the Second Bulgarian Kingdom. Sofia, 2024, "Ciela" Publishing House, ISBN 978-954-28-4614-7
