= Lyulyakovo =

Lyulyakovo may refer to the following places in Bulgaria:

- Lyulyakovo, Burgas Province
- Lyulyakovo, Dobrich Province
- Lyulyakovo, Kardzhali Province
