= Perperikon =

Archaeological site in Bulgaria

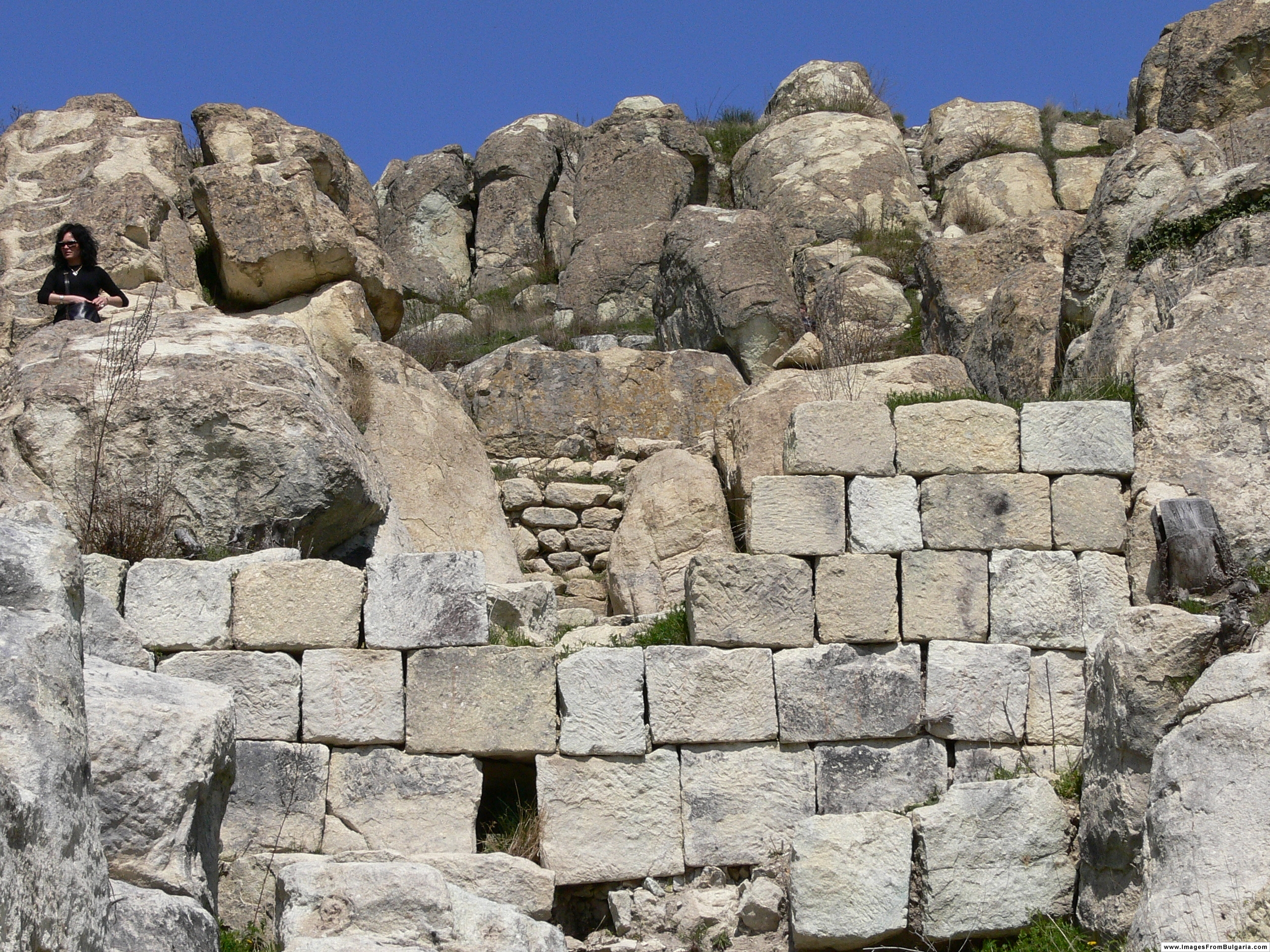
- The ruins of the ancient city of Perperikon

- Location within Bulgaria
- 41°42′53″N 25°27′55″E
- Type: Settlement, capital with Palace and Shrine
- Cultures: Thracian, Roman, Byzantine
- Location: Kardzhali Province, Bulgaria
- Region: Thrace

History
- Built: 5000 BCE, Bronze Age, Iron Age, Classical era
- Abandoned: 14th century

Site notes
- Material: rock-cut, stone masonry
- Excavation dates: 1931; from 2000 and still ongoing;
- Archaeologists: Nikolay Ovcharov
- Condition: In ruins

Perperikon (Bulgarian: Перперикон), also Perpericum, is an ancient Thracian city located in the Eastern Rhodope Mountains, 15 km northeast of the present-day town of Kardzhali, Bulgaria on a 470 m high rocky hill, which is thought to have been a sacred place. The village of Gorna krepost ("Upper Fortress") is located at the foot of the hill and the gold-bearing Perpereshka River flows nearby. Perperikon is the largest megalith ensemble site in the Balkans. In the Middle Ages Perperikon served as a fortress.

== Etymology ==
The name Perperikon (Greek: Περπερικόν) dates from the Middle Ages – 11th–13th centuries. The original name Hyperperakion was shortened by scribes to Perperakion or Perperikon. There are at least two theories about the origin and meaning of the name, both associating it with gold-mining: The city may have been named after a medieval high-temperature gold-refining process (Medieval Greek hyperpyros), or the resumed use of a classical-era name for the site, derived from a word for altar-fire (ancient Greek hyperpyros).

== History ==
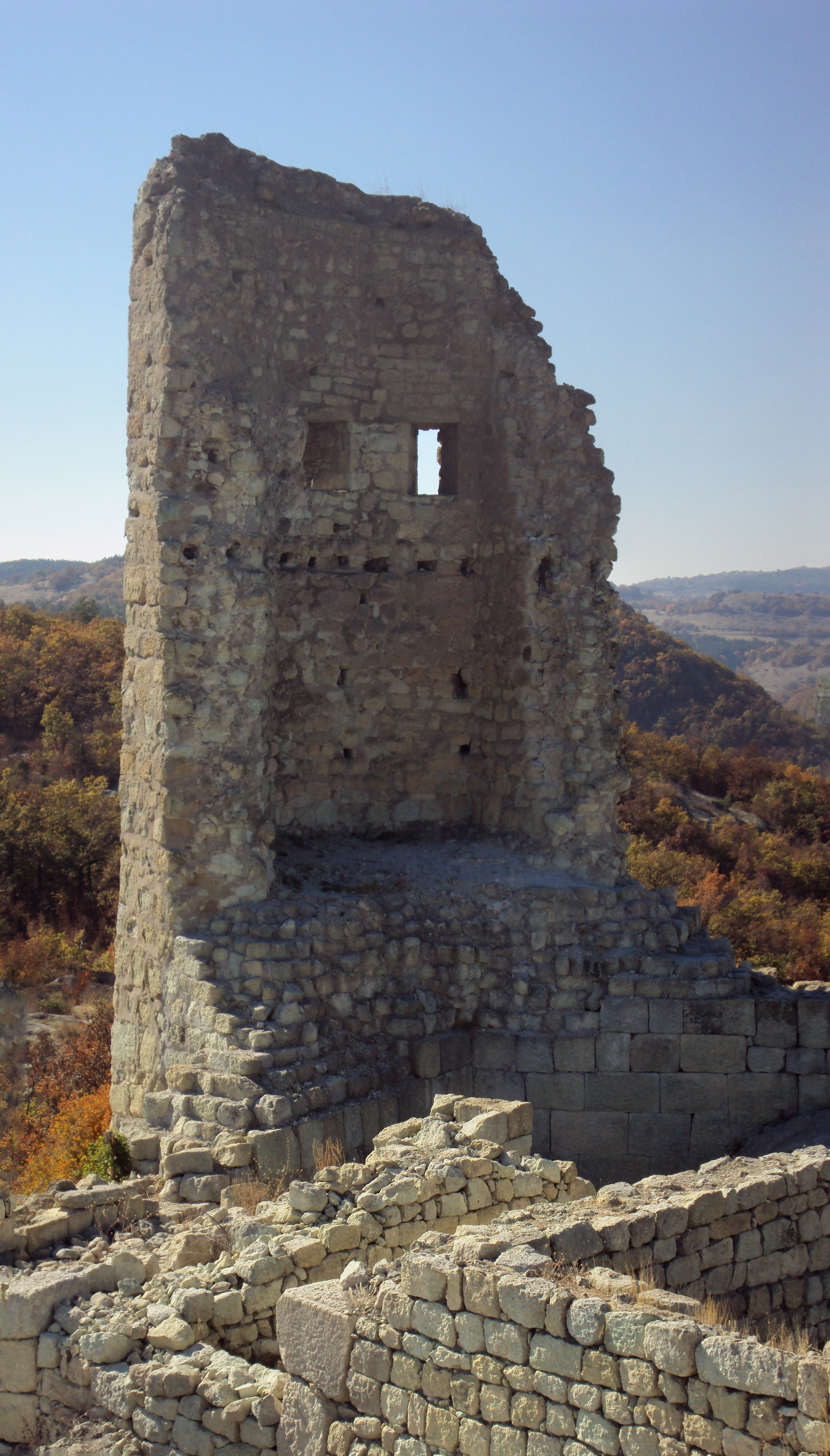
Tower of the medieval fortress

Human activity in the area dates back to 5000 BCE. The first traces of civilization on the hill date from the Bronze Age, while the ceramics found on the place date from the Early Iron Age, as well as the impressive round altar, almost 2 m in diameter, hewn out of the rocks.

It is thought that a famous Temple of Dionysus was located at Perperikon during the classical era.

Perperikon is the site from which Medokos declared himself the king of Thrace in 424 BCE, after Sitalces's death, but was overthrown.

Bulgarian archaeologist Nikolay Ovcharov started the excavation works at Perperikon in 2000, and revealed the remains of ancient architectural complex.

Archaeologists have uncovered a giant multi-story palace and an imposing fortress built around the hill, with walls as thick as 2.8 m. This dates from the time of the Roman Empire. Temples and residential quarters were also constructed in the fortress. The megalithic complex has been laid in ruins and re-erected many times throughout history.

A 2.4 million Euro visitor centre is being constructed with funds provided by the EU.

== Church ==
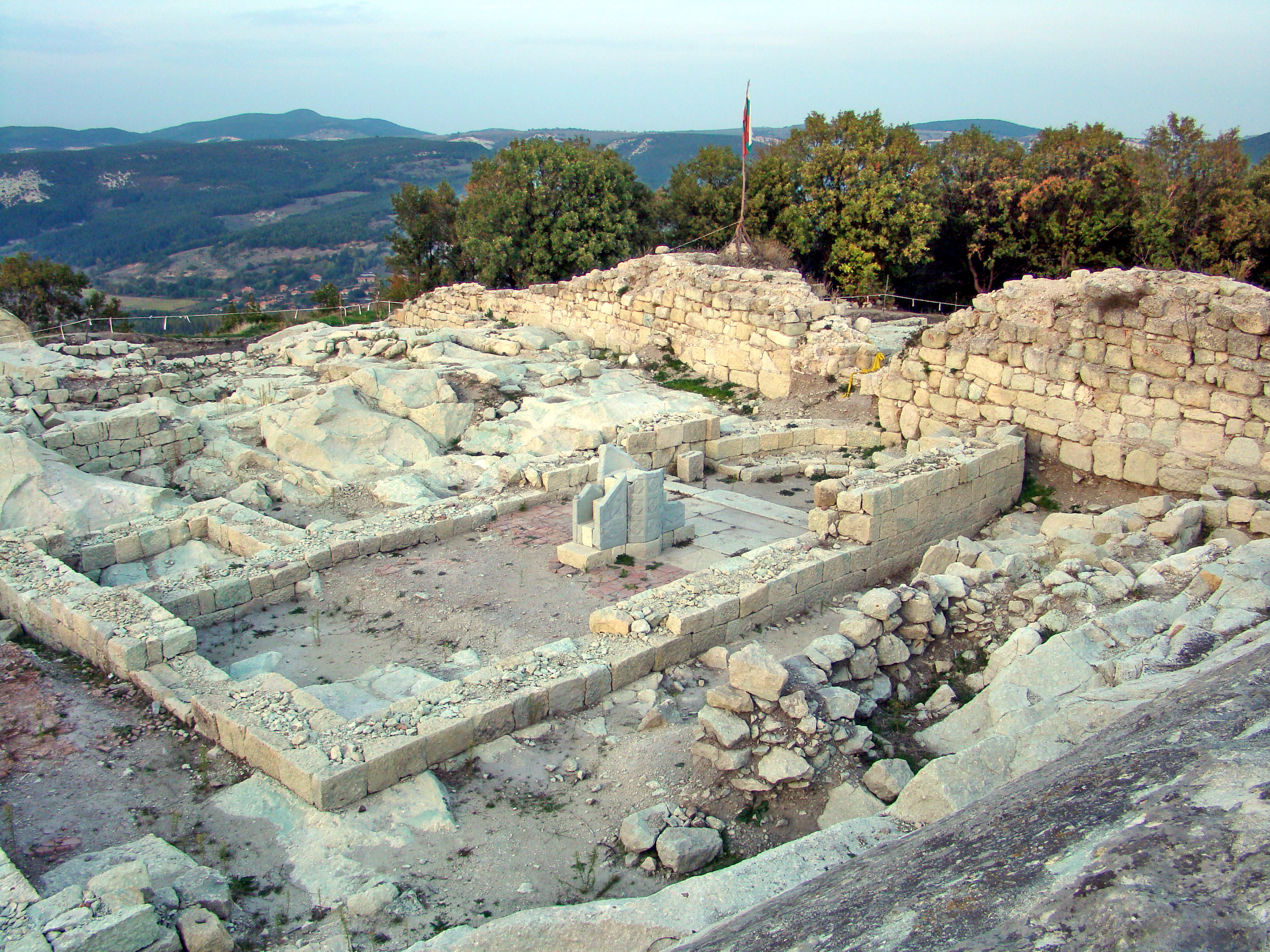
The Perperikon church site

A church pulpit was found by Bulgarian archeologists at the peak of the Thracian rock sanctuary on 10 September 2005. It is thought to be the first found in Bulgaria. The pulpit was probably built at the end of the 4th century CE or the early 5th century during the reign of Byzantine emperor Arcadius and coincided with the period of the Christianization of the Thracians in the Rhodopes area.

The church foundations are laid out in the form of a single nave basilica of 16.5 m length, which is the most typical form of late antique Christian church building. The pulpit is exceptionally well preserved and is richly decorated with ornaments incised on the stone, including a clearly visible eagle with outstretched wings. It also bears five inscriptions in Greek.

== Gallery ==
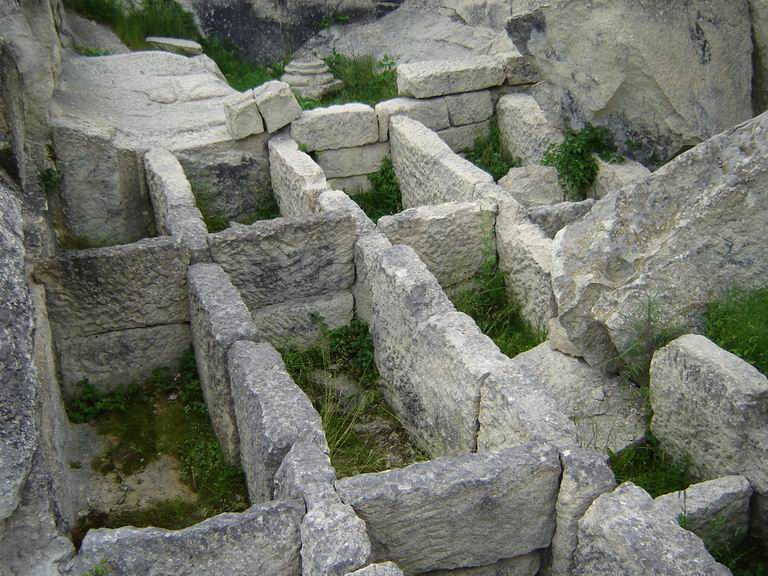
The tombs of the rulers.

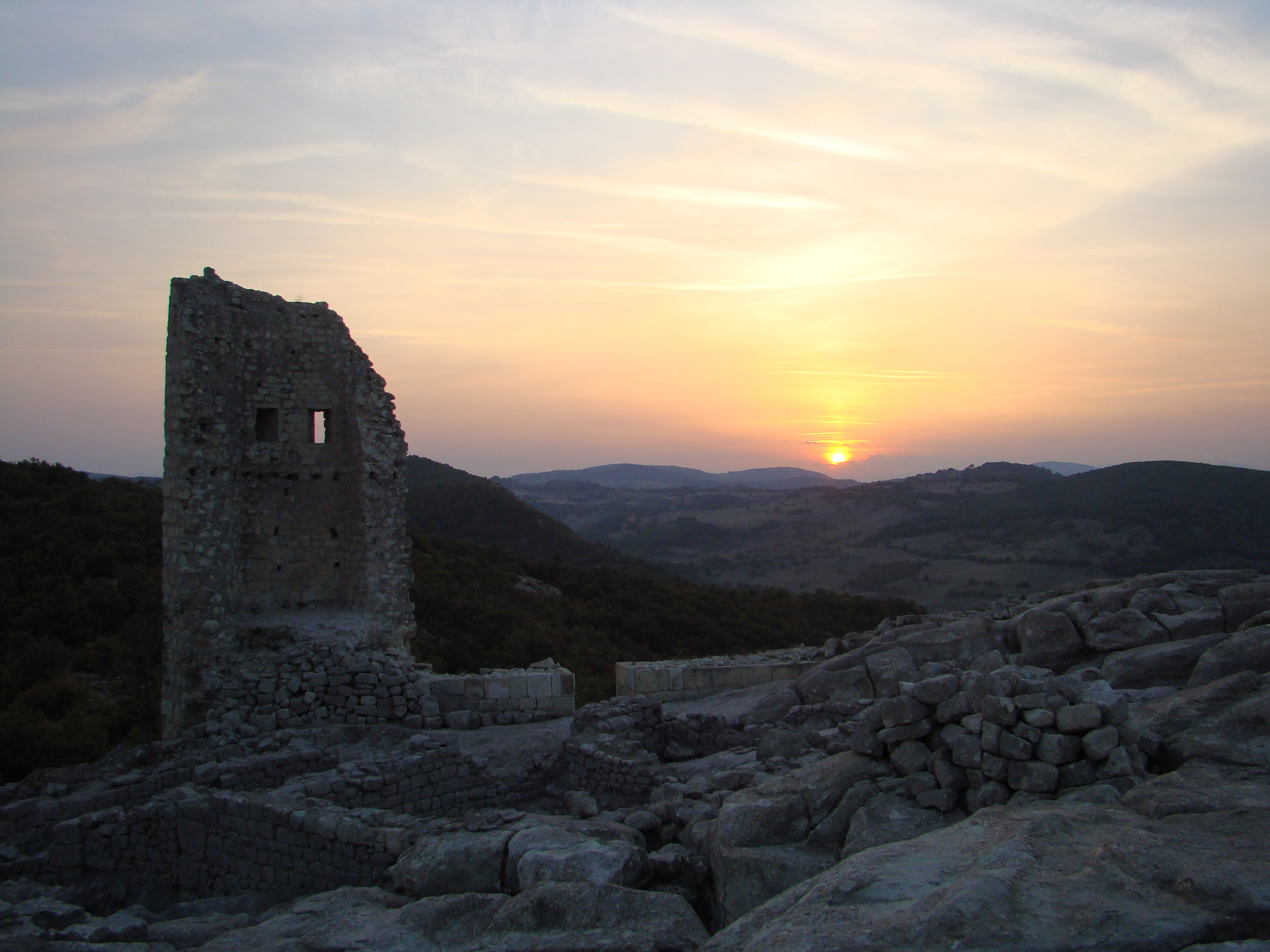
Other ancient buildings in Perperikon.

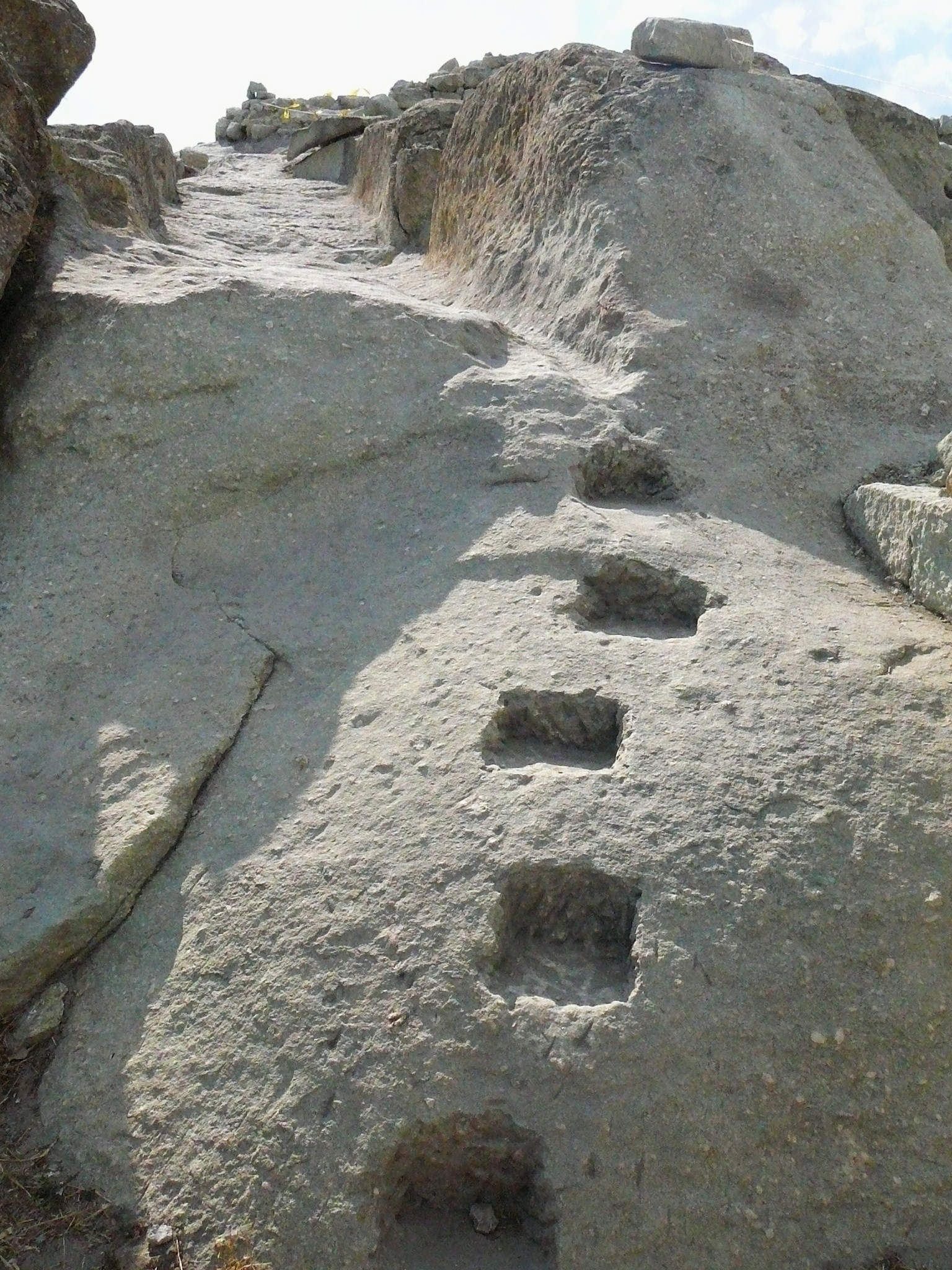

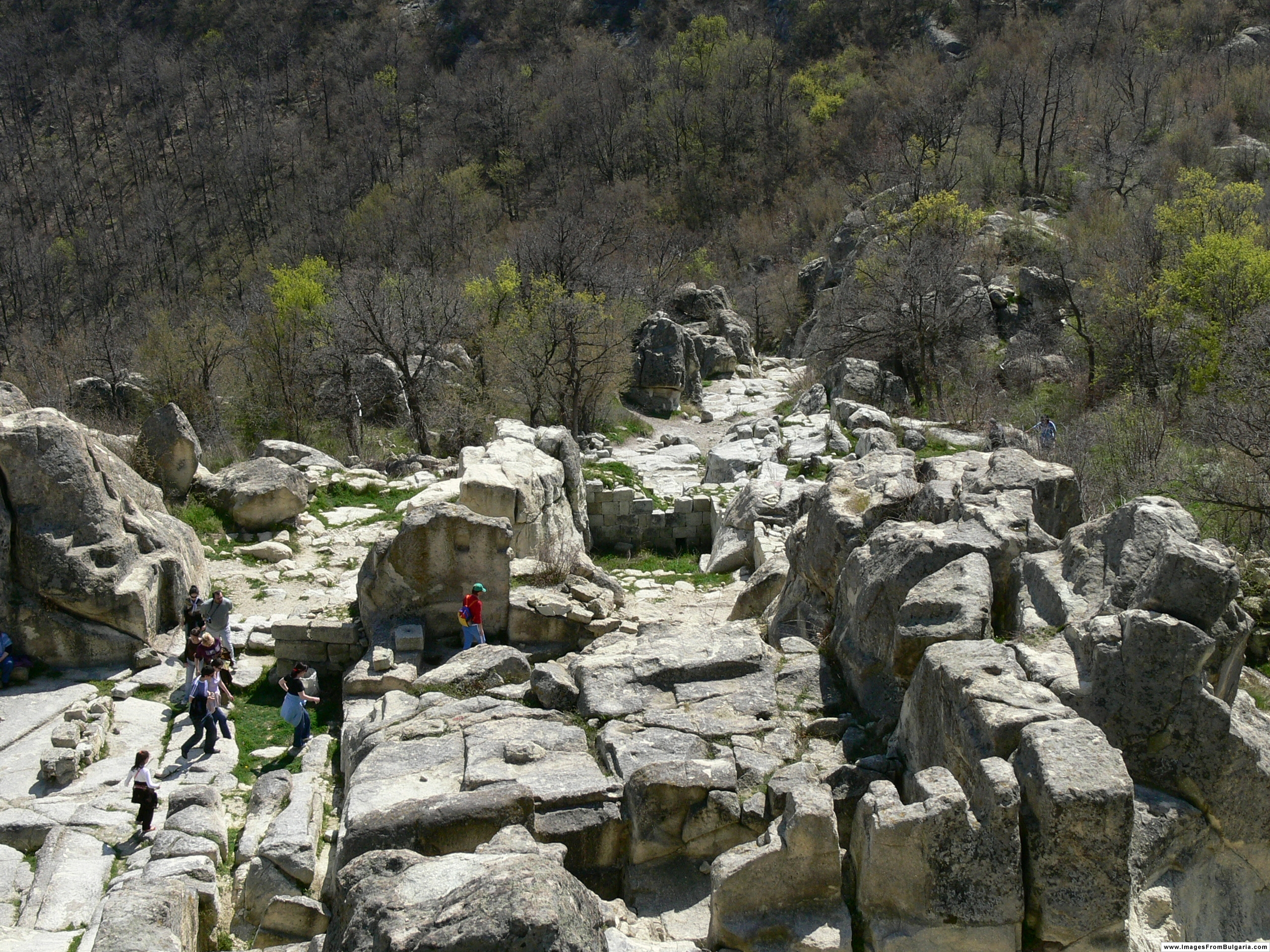

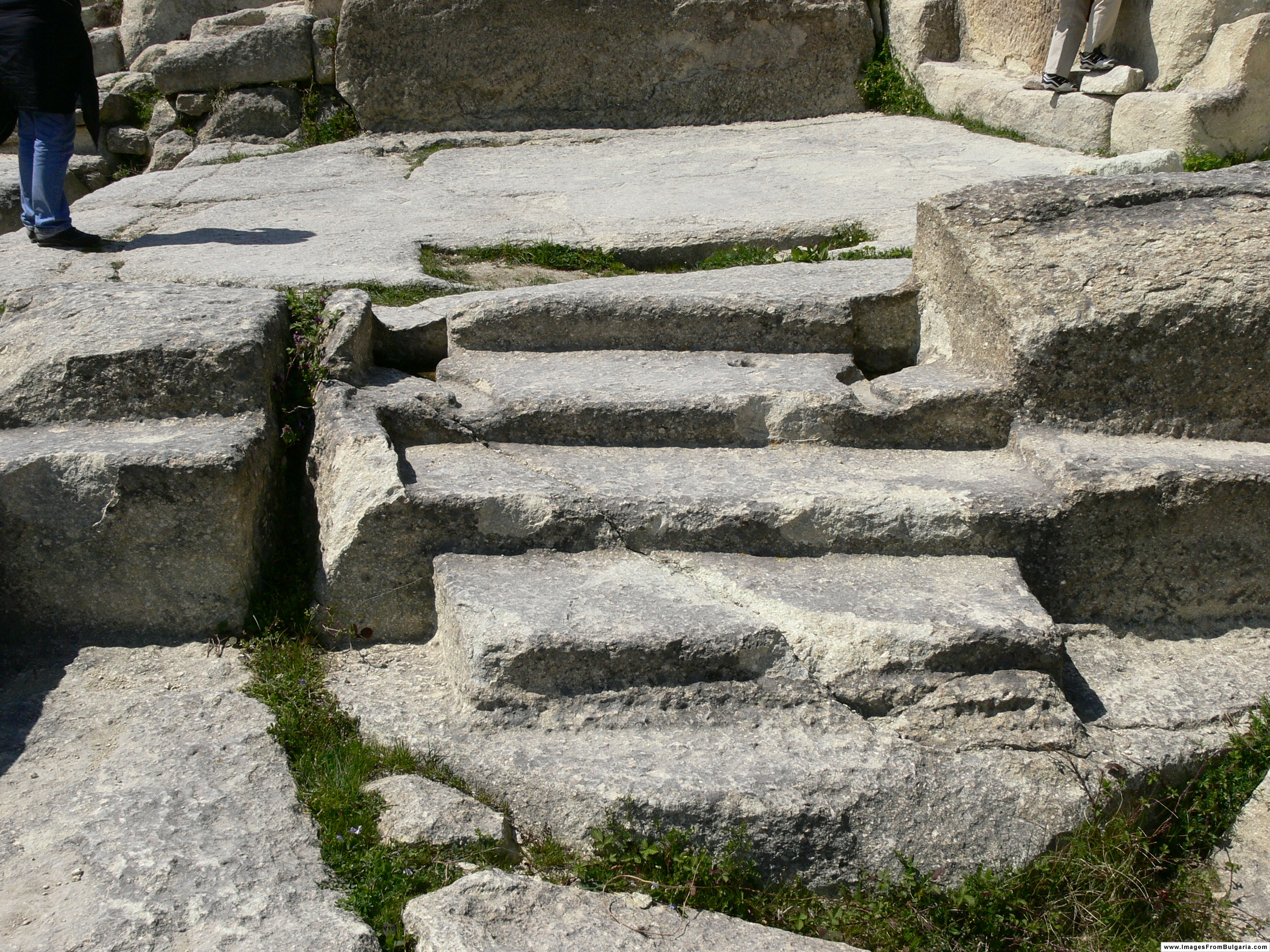

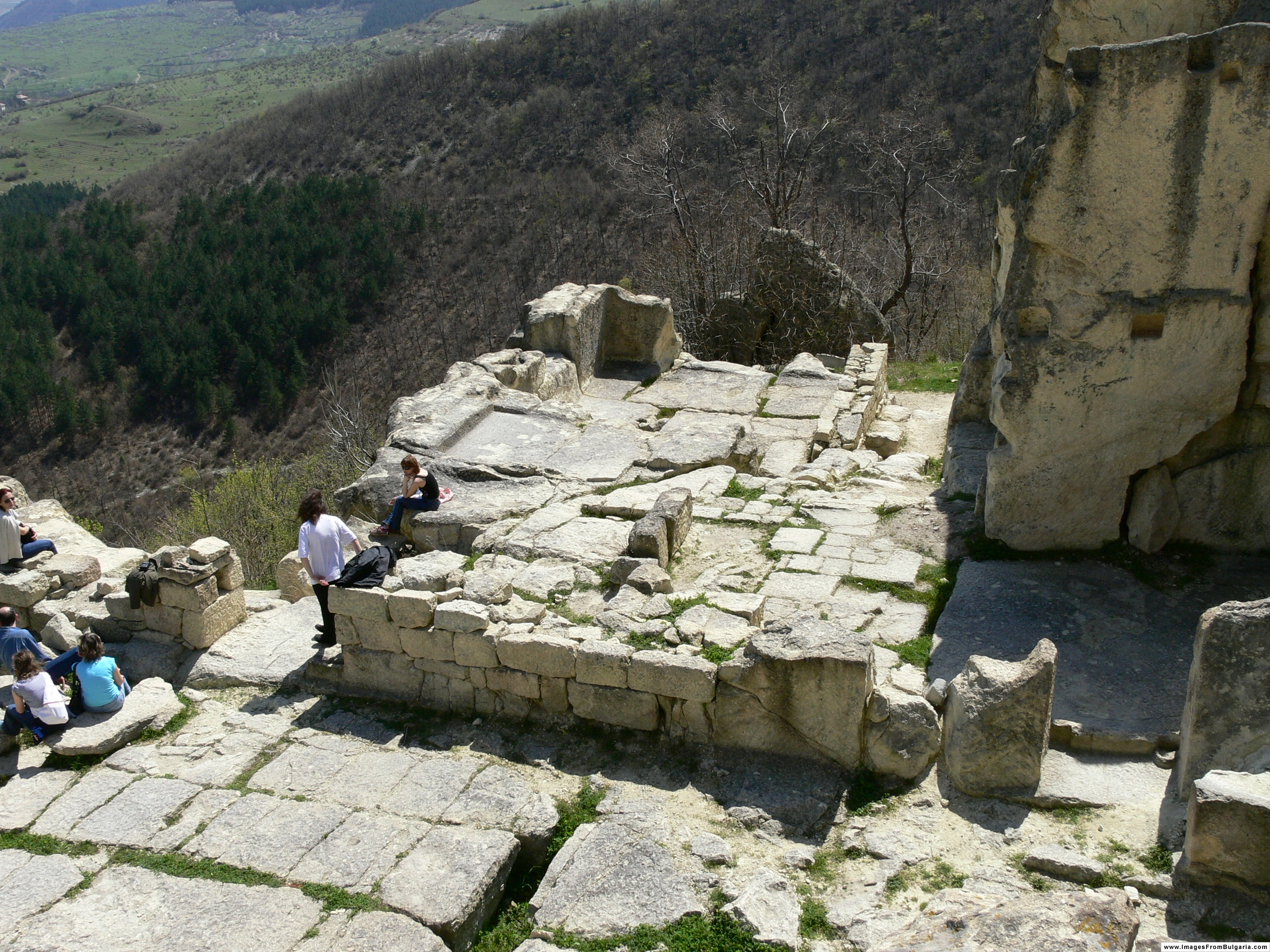

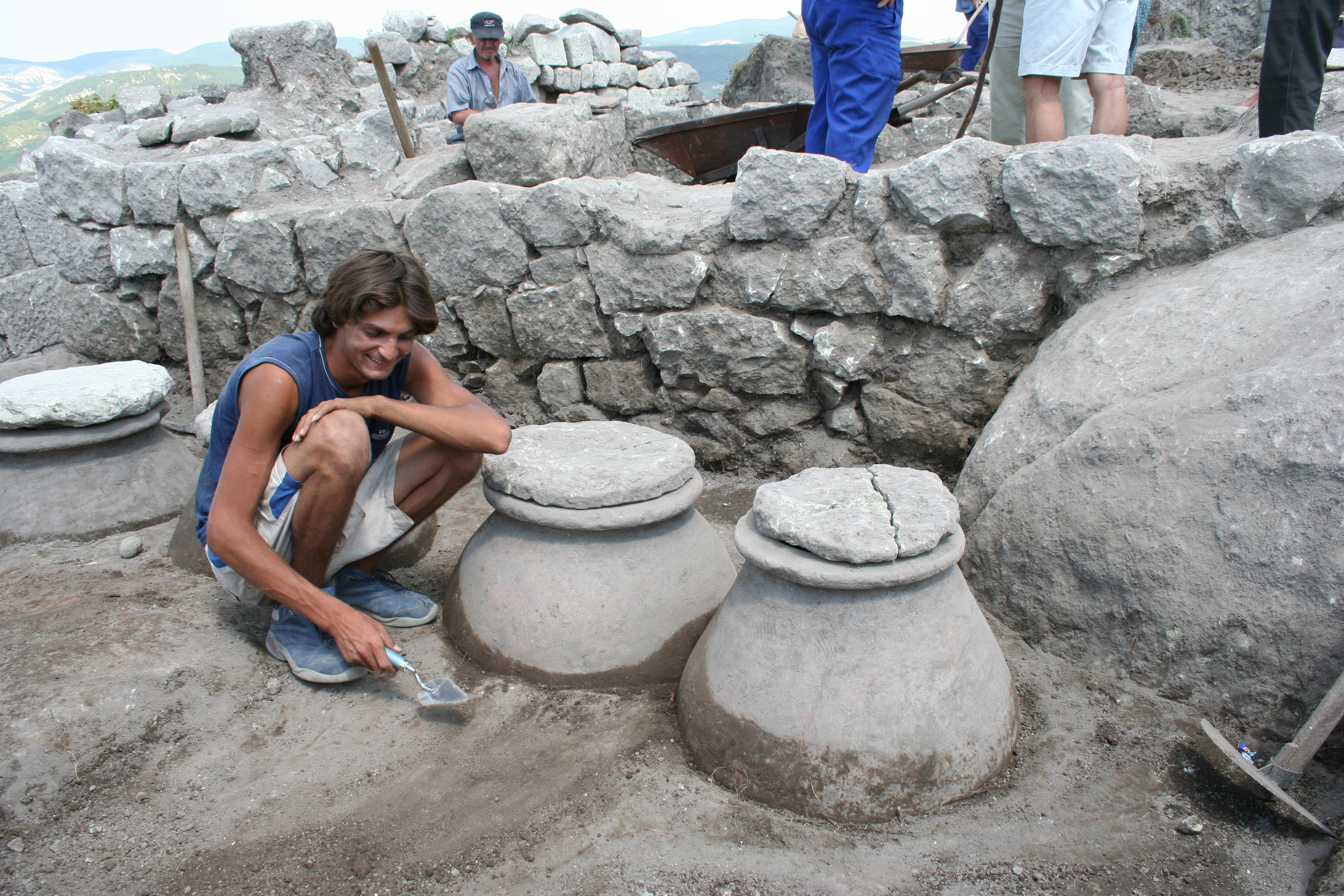
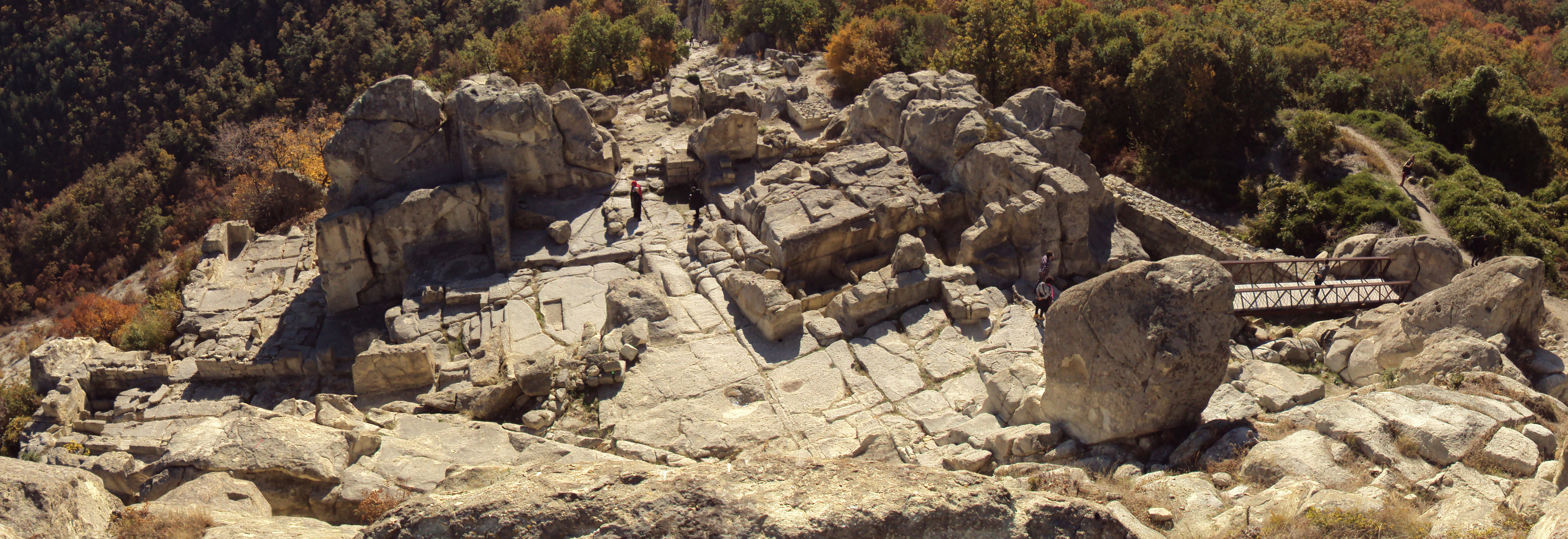
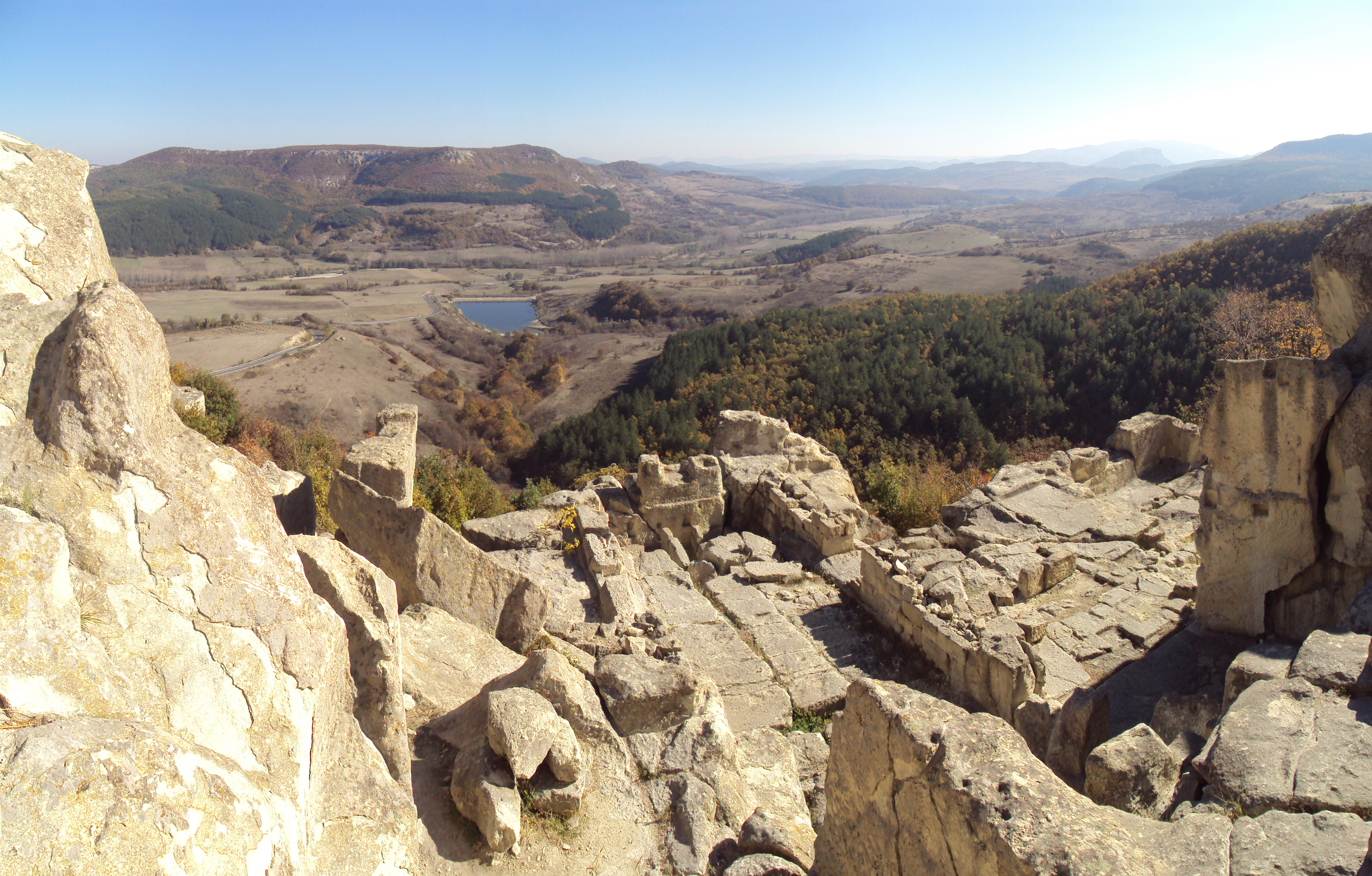
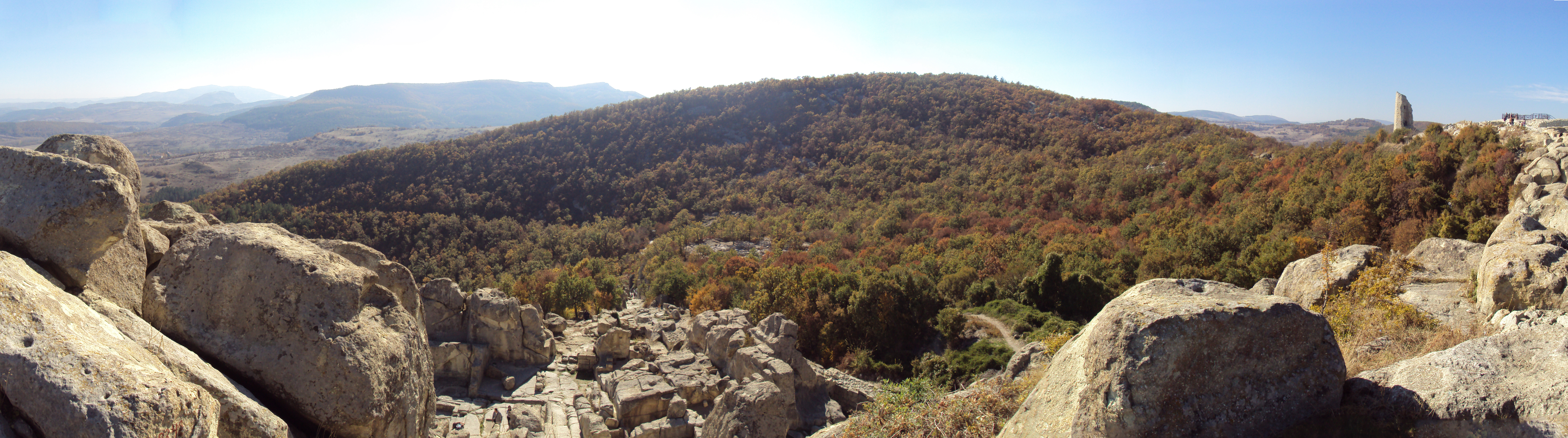
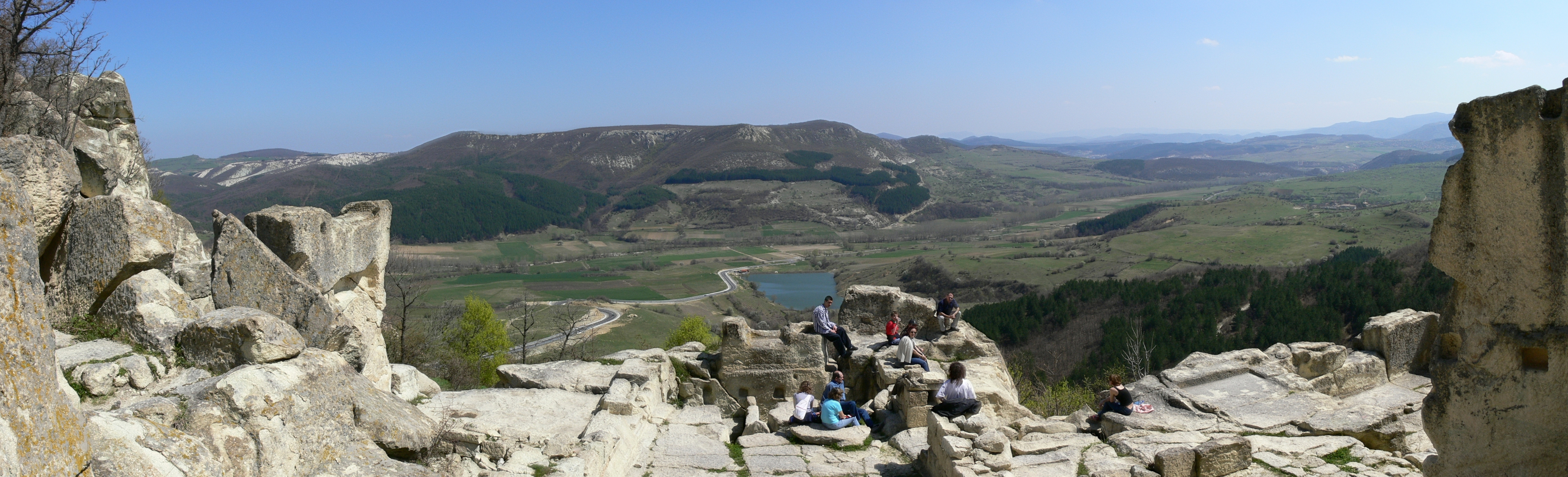

== Other sites named Perperek ==
Perperek Knoll on Livingston Island in the South Shetland Islands, Antarctica is named after the settlement of Perperek, in connection with the Thracian holy city of Perperikon.

== See also ==
- Durankulak (archaeological site)
- List of ancient cities in Thrace and Dacia
- Karanovo culture
- Seuthopolis
- Solnitsata
- Varna culture
- Tell Yunatsite
- Barbarikon
