= Perperek Knoll =

Peak on Livingston Island, Antarctica

Location of Varna Peninsula on Livingston Island in the South Shetland Islands

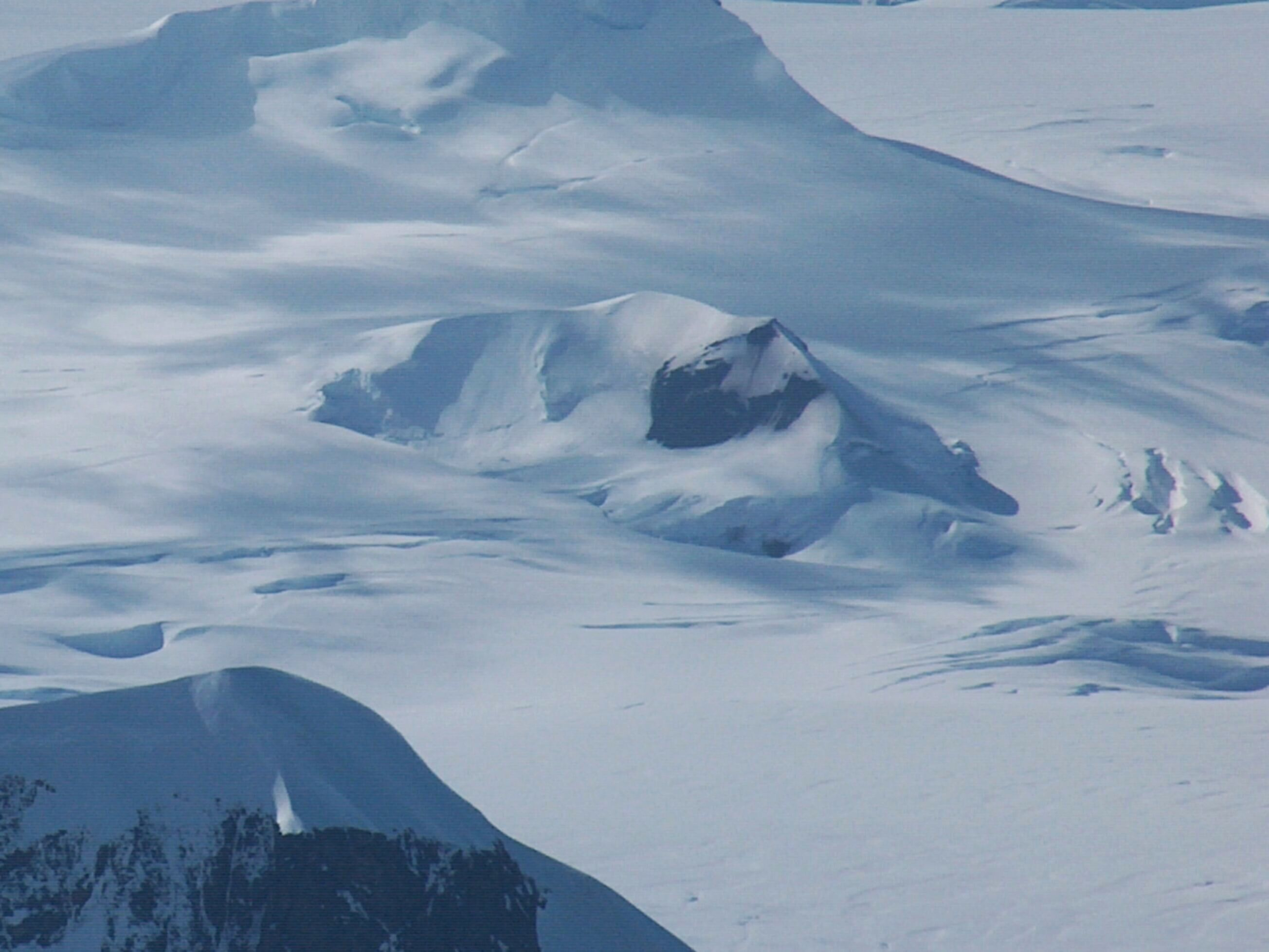
Perperek Knoll from Ongal Peak

Topographic map of Livingston Island and Smith Island

Perperek Knoll (Perperekska Mogila \per-pe-'rek-ska mo-'gi-la\) is a 360 meter peak in Vidin Heights on Varna Peninsula, Livingston Island in the South Shetland Islands, Antarctica. It has partly ice-free southeast slopes. The peak is named after the settlement of Perperek in the Rhodope Mountains site of the ancient town of Perperikon.

== Location ==
The knoll is located at 62°32′57″S 60°07′41″W which is 5.77 km north of Sliven Peak, 4.51 km northeast of Leslie Hill and 2.41 km southeast of Miziya Peak (Bulgarian topographic survey Tangra 2004/05, and mapping in 2005 and 2009).

== Maps ==
- L.L. Ivanov et al. Antarctica: Livingston Island and Greenwich Island, South Shetland Islands (from English Strait to Morton Strait, with illustrations and ice-cover distribution). Scale 1:100000 topographic map. Sofia: Antarctic Place-names Commission of Bulgaria, 2005.
- L.L. Ivanov. Antarctica: Livingston Island and Greenwich, Robert, Snow and Smith Islands. Scale 1:120000 topographic map. Troyan: Manfred Wörner Foundation, 2009. ISBN 978-954-92032-6-4
- A. Kamburov and L. Ivanov. Bowles Ridge and Central Tangra Mountains: Livingston Island, Antarctica. Scale 1:25000 map. Sofia: Manfred Wörner Foundation, 2023. ISBN 978-619-90008-6-1
