= Madrets, Kardzhali Province =

Mudrets Мъдрец
- Village
- Location within Bulgaria
- Coordinates: 41.7000°N 25.5333°E
- Country: Bulgaria
- Province: Kardzhali Province
- Municipality: Kardzhali

Area
  - Total: 5.452 km^{2} (2.105 sq mi)

Population
  - Total: 822
- Time zone: UTC+2 (EET)
  - Summer (DST): UTC+3 (EEST)

Mudrets is a village in Kardzhali Municipality, Kardzhali Province, southern Bulgaria.
