= Dolna krepost =

Dolna krepost Долна крепост
- Village
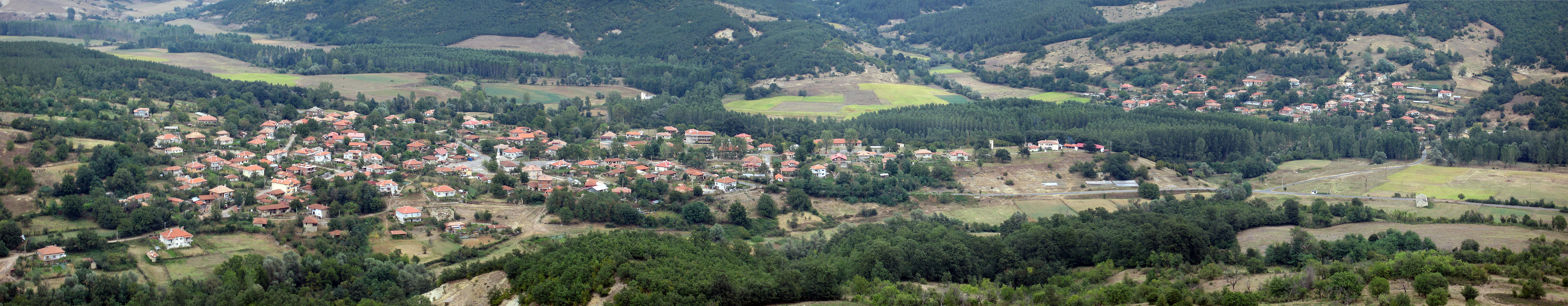
- View towards the Bulgarian villages of Gorna krepost (left) and Dolna krepost (right) from Perperikon

- Location within Bulgaria
- Coordinates: 41.7333°N 25.4833°E
- Country: Bulgaria
- Province: Kardzhali Province
- Municipality: Kardzhali
- Time zone: UTC+2 (EET)
  - Summer (DST): UTC+3 (EEST)

Dolna krepost is a village in Kardzhali Municipality, Kardzhali Province, southern Bulgaria.
