= Use-wear analysis =

Analysis of traces of use in archeology

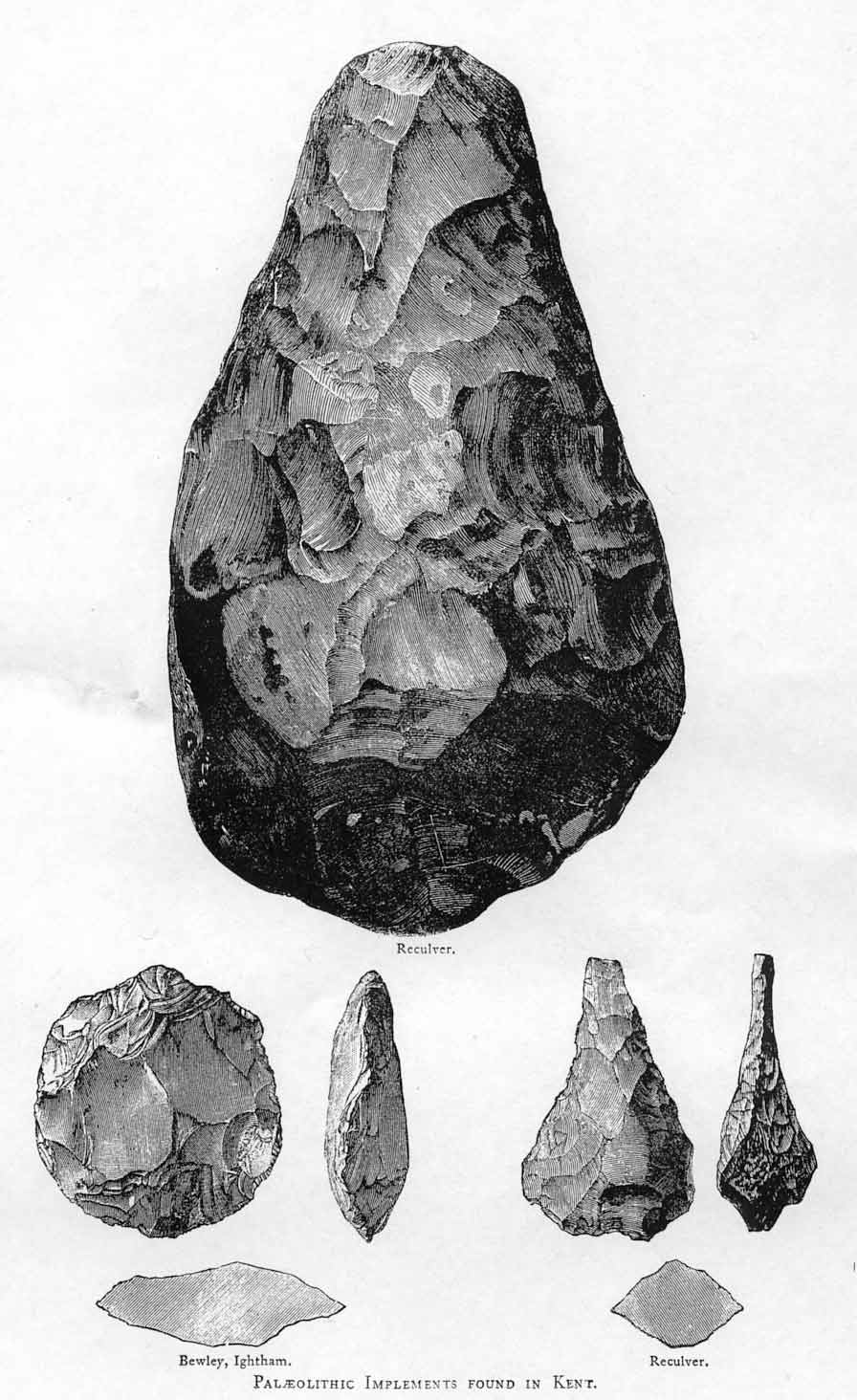
Acheulean hand-axes from Kent. The types shown are (clockwise from top) cordate, ficron, and ovate.

Use-wear analysis is a method in archaeology to identify the functions of artifact tools by closely examining their working surfaces and edges. It is mainly used on stone tools, and is sometimes referred to as "traceological analysis" (from the neologism traceology).

In studying the wear on a lithics, different techniques are often used. A distinction is often made between use-wear and microwear analysis. Use-wear uses an approach of low magnification study while micro-wear employs high magnification; this raises contentions as to which approach is more useful. Therefore, use-wear studies regularly employ magnification up to 50x, while magnification beyond 50x is relegated to microwear analysis. In addition to the two groups of magnification in which researchers align themselves, a third group examines evidence of use by attempting to identify organic residues present on a lithic. The organic residues are analyzed in order to understand the activities the lithics were used for such as butchering, or other tasks which can leave behind traces of working with wood, ceramics, or plant remains.

Tool edge damage and polish are two major sources for information about the use of a tool. Variations of polish type are formed depending on how a tool edge is used functionally, on the type(s) of material, and duration of use.

The type of edge damage also varies among different tools. But a distinction is necessary between the intended use, what the tool maker designed the tool for, and actual use. This is an important distinction to note as tools can be used for more than its intended function or designed for several purposes. An often noted example from modern culture are screwdrivers which are designed for driving screws but are regularly used to open cans of paint. This type of multi-purpose tool is noted in lithic assemblages by ethnographic and ethnoarchaeological studies. Basic edge damage types include step fractures, snap fractures, micro-flake scars, and edge rounding. Fractures are differentiated by looking at both fracture initiation and propagation. Fracture initiation is defined as where and how the fracture of an edge begins. Fracture propagation is defined by the path a crack follows, and the degree of the crack's growth. Fractures are often used to note how tools are created but also used in wear studies. For example, fracturing can help note whether a tool was used in an outward bending action rather than a downward force which can cause a flake to detach and create damage. In addition to flake scars, abrasion, edge rounding, and striations occurring after tool use, one must be careful to note whether this was from actual use or from handling after excavation/collection. Alterations to a tool's edge or surface can result from improper handling or storage. For example, two artifacts within the same bag can cause wear marks from constant interaction, also the bags themselves have been noted to cause wear on artifacts.

Experimental archaeology can be employed to test hypotheses on tool function by replicating different activities with freshly made tools. The reliability of experimental archaeology as an information source for use-wear analysis has been tested through multiple blind tests. These tests judge the ability to identify tool motion and contact material. One study done at the University of California Davis found that tool action was correctly identified 84 percent of the time, while tool material was correctly identified 74 percent of the time.

The reliability of experimental archaeology has made it a popular method for assisting in the analysis of use-wear. With a microscope and proper training, use-wear analysis can be a useful resource. Although experimental analysis of use-wear may be used for its relatively cheap price, it can be a time-consuming endeavor. This may require flint-knapping a tool comparable to the artifact under analysis, which can be long process dependent on personal ability, or buying such a tool. Also, the replication of tool use requires comparable source material (for tool creation) as well as access to the material the tool was used on. Additionally, the experiments must last an acceptable amount of time; slicing an object once will not suffice and requires countless attempts per tool and per material used upon. One example notes how Méry conducted use-wear analysis and experimental archaeology to examine 7 flint blades from a pottery workshop of Nausharo site in Pakistan, which reveals that these blades were used to trim clay on a turning wheel.
