= Tri Mogili, Kardzhali Province =

Tri mogili Три могили
- Village
- Location within Bulgaria
- Coordinates: 41°49′35″N 25°04′05″E
- Country: Bulgaria
- Province: Kardzhali Province
- Municipality: Kardzhali
- Time zone: UTC+2 (EET)
  - Summer (DST): UTC+3 (EEST)

Tri mogili is a village in Kardzhali Municipality, Kardzhali Province, southern Bulgaria.
