= Perperek (village) =

Perperek Перперек
- Village
- Location within Bulgaria
- Coordinates: 41.6833°N 25.5500°E
- Country: Bulgaria
- Province: Kardzhali Province
- Municipality: Kardzhali

Population (2017)
  - Total: ▲714
- Time zone: UTC+2 (EET)
  - Summer (DST): UTC+3 (EEST)

Perperek is a village in Kardzhali Municipality, Kardzhali Province, southern Bulgaria.

== Population ==
According to the 2011 census, the collage of Perperek has 706 inhabitants. Perperek has a Turkish speaking population, consisting of ethnic Turks (59%) and Romani people (38%). There are also a few ethnic Bulgarians (3%) living in the village.
