= Dabin =

Dabin may refer to:

- Da-bin, Korean given name
- Zuo Dabin, Chinese actress
- Tan Dabin, a village in Talesh County, Gilan Province, Iran
- Dabin (music producer), a Canadian music producer
- Dabin, a former member of the boy group Touch
- Florence Dabin (born 1979), French politician

== See also ==
- Dabbing, a gesture
