= Jean de La Rochefoucauld-Bayers =

French nobleman

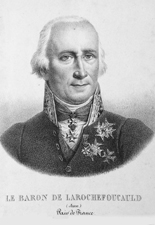

Peer of France
- In office 17 August 1815 – 8 January 1832

Personal details
- Born: Jean Baptiste de La Rochefoucauld-Bayers; 27 June 1757 Apremont, Vendée
- Died: 1 February 1834 (aged 76) Paris
- Spouse: Denise de Mauroy (m. 1798; died 1834)
- Children: François Denis Henri Albert de La Rochefoucauld
- Parent(s): Jacques-Louis de La Rochefoucauld-Bayers; Suzanne Poictevin du Plessis-Landry
- Awards: Order of Saint-Louis; Order of the Holy Spirit; Order of Saint-Michel

Jean Baptiste de La Rochefoucauld-Bayers, 1st Baron of La Rochefoucauld-Bayers (27 June 1757 – 1 February 1834) was a French soldier in the Armée des Émigrés and ultra-royalist politician during the 18th and 19th centuries.

== Early life ==
Jean Baptiste was born on 27 June 1757 at the Château de la Boislivière in Apremont, Vendée. He was the third son of Jacques-Louis I de La Rochefoucauld (1717–1798), Lord of Beaulieu, and Suzanne Poictevin du Plessis-Landry de La Rochette (1725–1793). He had at least eight brothers and sisters, including Jacques-Louis II, Marquis of La Rochefoucauld-Bayers; Charles-François de La Rochefoucauld-Bayers, deputy to the Estates General of 1789; and Pierre Aimé de La Rochefoucauld-Bayers, Lord of Breuil.

His paternal grandparents were René Claude de La Rochefoucauld, Captain General of the Coast Guard, and Anne Louise Robert de Lézardière. His maternal grandparents were Louis Poictevin, Lord of la Guittière, and Suzanne Thomasset.

== Career ==
He entered service in the Auvergne regiment on 1 January 1772, was appointed Captain in the regiment of La Rochefoucauld Dragoons, the 28 January 1778 then Colonel of Infantry. He emigrated in 1790, and created Maréchal de camp on 1 January 1796. Baron de La Rochefoucauld made all the campaigns in the corps of Louis Joseph, Prince of Condé, first as First Aide-Major-General of the Household, then, from 1797, as Major-General. King Louis XVIII charged him with several important missions, and in particular that of negotiating in Saint Petersburg, the transfer to the service of the Army of Condé with Emperor Paul I of Russia in 1797. Shortly after, Baron de la Rochefoucauld was made a Commander of the Russian Order of Saint John of Jerusalem at the Grand Priory of Russia.

Returning to France in 1802, he had trouble with the imperial police, and was detained for nine months, despite the intervention of his relative, the Countess of La Rochefoucauld, dame d'honneur to the French Empress Joséphine. Two years later, he refused the rank of Division General and the restitution of 700,000 francs which he claimed from Emperor Napoleon I.

After the Bourbon Restoration, the King promoted him to Lieutenant-General of the Armies on 13 August 1814, Director of the Dépôt de la Guerre and created a Peer of France on 17 August 1815. He was then, successively, Inspector General of Cavalry in 1816, and Commander, then Grand Cross of the Order of Saint-Louis, on 30 September 1818 and 21 August 1822, and Knight of the Order of the Holy Spirit in 1827.

The Baron of La Rochefoucauld-Bayers was a member of the Commission responsible for examining the services of former emigrants and Vendée. He was called to the government of the 12th Military Division in July 1823, and chaired the General Council of the department of Aude in 1825.

He resigned as a peer in 1832 and died two years later as a result of paralysis which he had suffered in 1830, upon learning the false news of the death of his son, a captain in the Royal Guard, during the July Revolution.

== Personal life ==
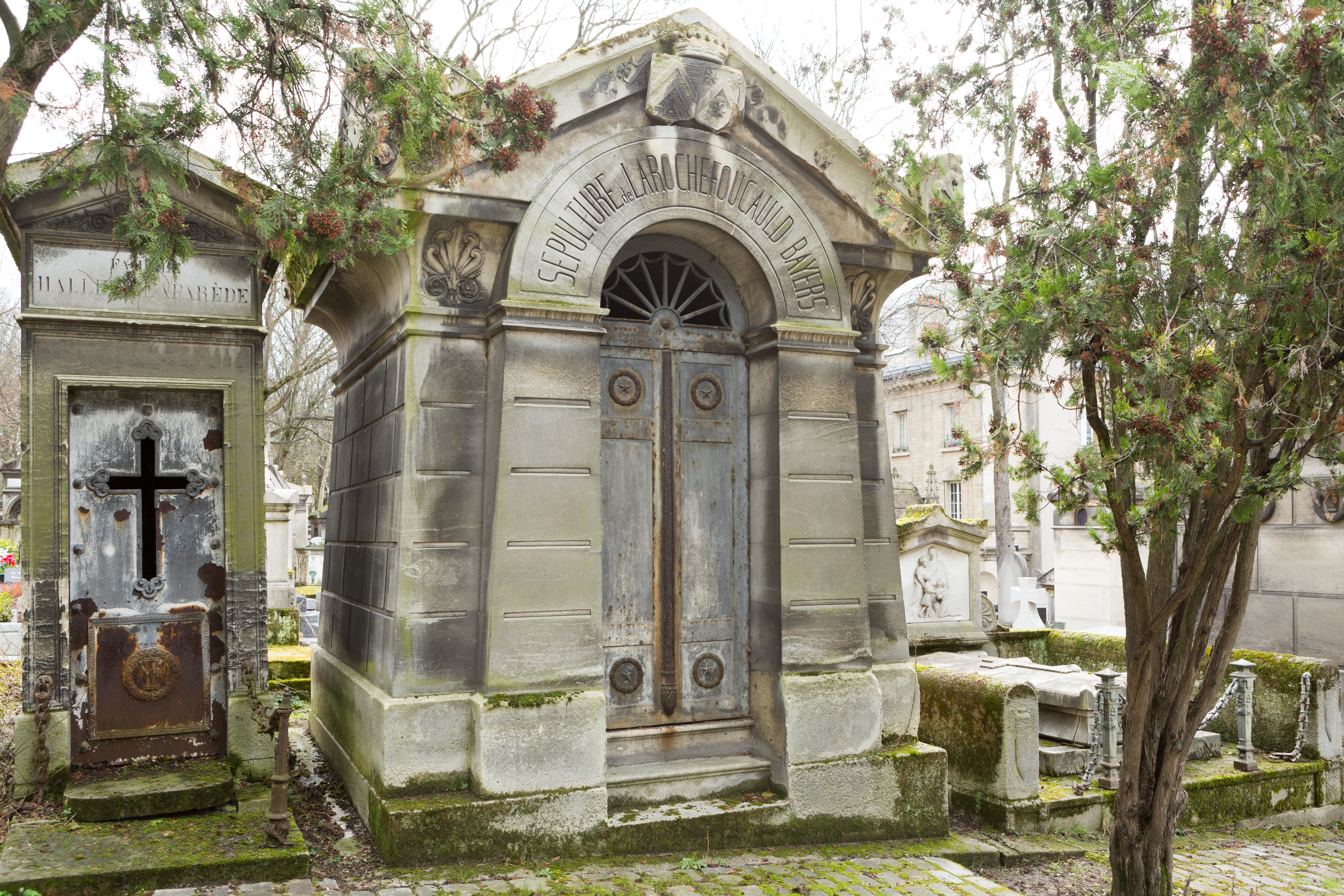
Grave of the Baron of La Rochefoucauld-Bayers

On 13 June 1798, he married Denise-Jeanne-Catherine de Mauroy (d. 1837) in Dubno in the Russian province of Volhynia. She was the only daughter of Denis Jean, Marquis of Mauroy, Lieutenant General of the King's Armies, Governor of Tarascon. Together, they were the parents of one son:

- François Denis Henri Albert de La Rochefoucauld (1799–1854), Baron de Bayers, who married Ida Le Roy de La Potherie, in 1826. They built the neo-Gothic Château de Challain-la-Potherie between 1847 and 1854.

The Baron died on 1 February 1834 in the 10th arrondissement of Paris and was buried at the Père-Lachaise Cemetery.

=== Descendants ===
Through his son François, he was a grandfather of Henri François de La Rochefoucauld (1823–1893), Lord of Challain-la-Potherie, in Maine-et-Loire (who died without issue); and Marie de La Rochefoucauld, who died in 1868 at the Château de Challain-la-Potherie. Henri's heir, the Viscount of Rochebouët, decided not to keep the extensive property and sold the château to Marquis Albert Courtès in 1894.

== Honours ==
- Commander of the Order of Saint Lazarus (1788)
- Commander (1818) and Grand Cross (1822) of the Royal and Military Order of Saint-Louis
- Knight of the Order of the Holy Spirit (1827)
- Knight of the Order of Saint-Michel
