= Da-bin =

- Hangul: 다빈
- RR: Dabin
- MR: Tabin

Da-bin is a Korean given name.

People with this name include:

- Kim Da-bin (born 1989), South Korean football player
- Kim Da-bin (tennis) (born 1997), South Korean tennis player
- Dabin (music producer), Canadian musician
- Lee Da-bin (born 1996), South Korean taekwondo practitioner
- Yeonwoo (born Lee Da-bin, 1996) South Korean actress
- Jeong Da-bin (1980–2007), South Korean actress
- Jung Da-bin (actress, born 2000), South Korean actress
- Choi Da-bin (born 2000), South Korean figure skater
- DPR Live (born Hong Da-bin, 1993), South Korean rapper and singer

== See also ==
- List of Korean given names
- Dabin (disambiguation)
