= Florence Dabin =

French politician (born 1979)

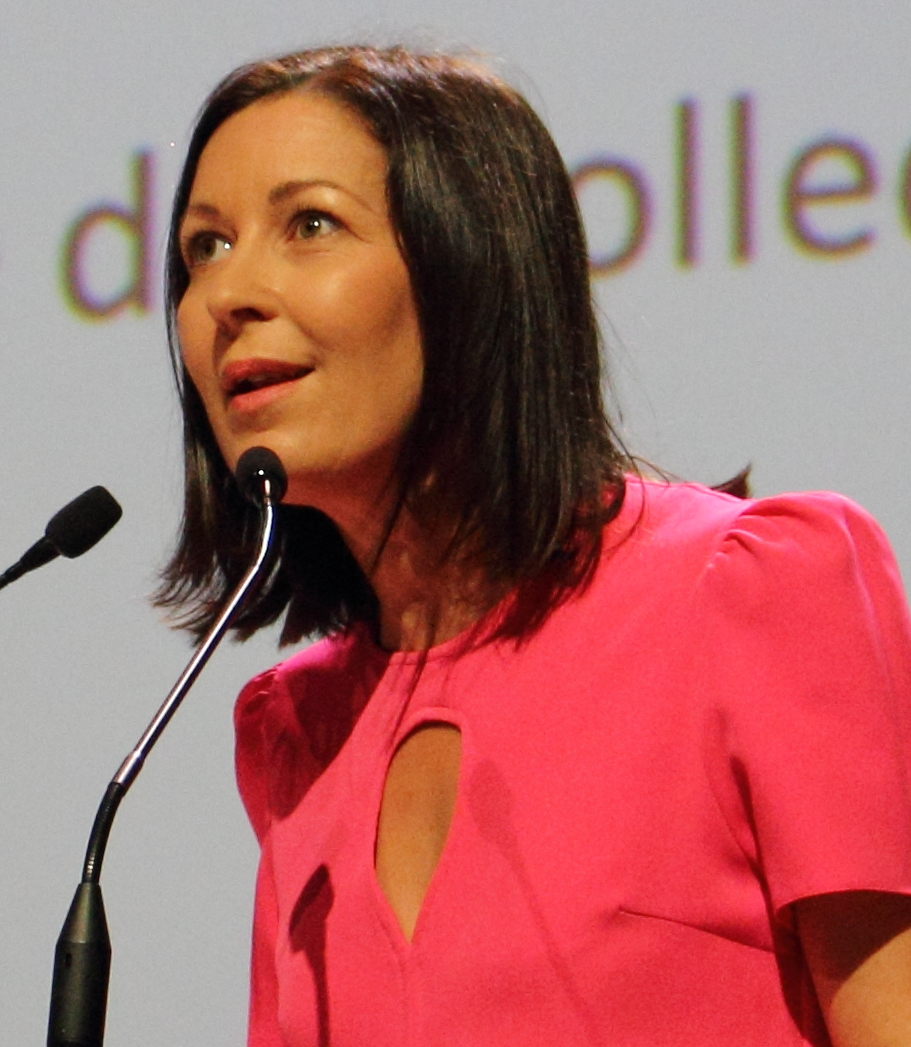
- Dabin in 2022

President of the Departmental Council of Maine-et-Loire
- Incumbent
- Assumed office 2 July 2021
- Preceded by: Christian Gillet

Personal details
- Born: 27 March 1979 (age 47)
- Party: Independent
- Other political affiliations: Miscellaneous right

Florence Dabin (born 27 March 1979) is a French politician serving as a member of the Departmental Council of Maine-et-Loire since 2008. She has served as president of the council since 2021.
