= Tan Dabin =

Tan Dabin تن دبين
- Village
- Location within Iran
- Coordinates: 37°52′11″N 48°39′26″E
- Country: Iran
- Province: Gilan
- County: Talesh
- Bakhsh: Central
- Rural District: Kuhestani-ye Talesh

Population (2006)
  - Total: 141
- Time zone: UTC+3:30 (IRST)
  - Summer (DST): UTC+4:30 (IRDT)

Tan Dabin (Persian: تن دبين, also Romanized as Tan Dabīn; also known as Nāvān-e Bālā and Tan Davīn) is a village in Kuhestani-ye Talesh Rural District, in the Central District of Talesh County, Gilan Province, Iran. At the 2006 census, its population was 141, in 28 families.

== Language ==
Linguistic composition of the village.

Tan Dabin linguistic composition
language	percent
Azerbaijani	100%
