= Challain-la-Potherie =

- Commune
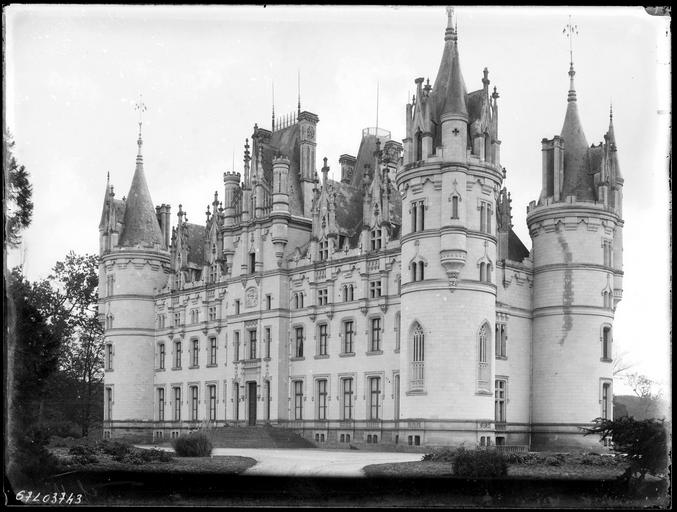
- The Chateau of Challain-la-Potherie
- Location of Challain-la-Potherie
- Location within France Location within Pays de la Loire
- Coordinates: 47°38′13″N 1°02′43″W
- Country: France
- Region: Pays de la Loire
- Department: Maine-et-Loire
- Arrondissement: Segré
- Canton: Segré-en-Anjou Bleu

Government
  - Mayor (2020–2026): Anaël Robert
- Area^{1}: 47.87 km^{2} (18.48 sq mi)
- Elevation: 58 m (190 ft)
- Highest elevation: 106 m (348 ft)
- Lowest elevation: 42 m (138 ft)
- Population (2023): 827
  - Density: 17.3/km^{2} (44.7/sq mi)
- Demonym(s): Chalainois, Chalainoise
- Time zone: UTC+01:00 (CET)
  - Summer (DST): UTC+02:00 (CEST)
- INSEE/Postal code: 49061 /49440
- ^{1} French Land Register data, which excludes lakes, ponds, glaciers > 1 km^{2} (0.386 sq mi or 247 acres) and river estuaries.

Challain-la-Potherie (French pronunciation: [ʃalɛ̃ la pɔtʁi]) is a village and a commune in the Maine-et-Loire department in western France. It is 9 km (6 mi) north of Candé.

== Twinning ==
In 2010 Challain-la-Potherie celebrated the tenth anniversary of its accord with the village of Somersham in Suffolk, England. The accord has been very successful with annual coach trips between the two villages - visits alternating year and year about. Many friendships have been formed and the twinning is particularly strong in the number of children and young people involved.

== See also ==
- Communes of the Maine-et-Loire department
- Château de Challain-la-Potherie
