= Departmental Council of Maine-et-Loire =

Departmental legislature in France

Departmental Council of Maine-et-Loire Conseil départemental de Maine-et-Loire

Leadership
- President: Florence Dabin, DVD since 1 July 2021

Structure
- Seats: 42
- Political groups: Government (34): DVD (26); LR (4); Agir (2); UDI (2); Opposition (8): DVG (6); PS (2); www.maine-et-loire.fr

The Departmental Council of Maine-et-Loire (French: Conseil départemental de Maine-et-Loire), is the deliberative assembly of the Maine-et-Loire department in the region of Pays de la Loire. It consists of 42 members (general councilors) from 21 cantons and its headquarters are in Angers.

The President of the General Council is Florence Dabin since 1 July 2021.

== Vice-Presidents ==
The President of the Departmental Council is assisted by 12 vice-presidents chosen from among the departmental councilors. Each of them has a delegation of authority.

List of vice-presidents of the Maine-et-Loire Departmental Council (as of 2021)
Order	Name	Party	Canton (constituency)	Delegation
1st	Philippe Chalopin	DVD	Beaufort-en-Anjou	Tourism and finance
2nd	Marie-Jo Hamard	DVC	Segré-en-Anjou Bleu	Ecological transition
3rd	Jean-François Raimbault	DVC	Angers-5	Elderly
4th	Régine Brichet	DVD	Tiercé	Education and sports
5th	Gilles Piton	DVD	Mauges-sur-Loire	Attractiveness and territorial balance
6th	Françoise Damas	DVD	Saumur	Child protection
7th	Xavier Testard	DVD	Cholet-2	Resources and quality of public service
8th	Marie-Pierre Martin	DVD	Beaufort-en-Anjou	Better living for the disabled
9th	Yann Semler-Collery	DVC	Chemillé-en-Anjou	Culture and heritage
10th	Roselyne Bienvenu	UCD	Angers-1	Social equality and inclusion
11th	Gilles Leroy	DVC	Beaupréau-en-Mauges	Integration, habitat, housing and city policy
12th	Marie-Paule Chesneau	DVD	Chalonnes-sur-Loire	Prevention

== See also ==
- Maine-et-Loire
- General councils of France
