= Flée =

Flée may refer to the following communes in France:

- Flée, Côte-d'Or, in the Côte-d'Or department
- Flée, Sarthe, in the Sarthe department
- Dampierre-et-Flée, in the Côte-d'Or department
- L'Hôtellerie-de-Flée, in the Maine-et-Loire department
- La Ferrière-de-Flée, in the Maine-et-Loire department
- Saint-Sauveur-de-Flée, in the Maine-et-Loire department

== See also ==
- Flee (disambiguation)
