= Semur =

Semur may refer to:

== Geography ==
One of several communes in France:

- Bierre-lès-Semur, in the Côte-d'Or département
- Courcelles-lès-Semur, in the Côte-d'Or département
- Massingy-lès-Semur, in the Côte-d'Or département
- Semur-en-Auxois, in the Côte-d'Or département
- Semur-en-Brionnais, in the Saône-et-Loire département
- Semur-en-Vallon, in the Sarthe département

== Cuisine ==
- Semur (Indonesian stew)

== See also ==
- Semu
