= Massingy =

Massingy is the name or part of the name of the following communes in France:

- Massingy, Côte-d'Or, in the Côte-d'Or department
- Massingy, Haute-Savoie, in the Haute-Savoie department
- Massingy-lès-Semur, in the Côte-d'Or department
- Massingy-lès-Vitteaux, in the Côte-d'Or department
