= Fleay =

Fleay is a surname of English origin. People with the name include:

- Clarrie Fleay (1886–1955), Australian cricketer
- David Fleay (1907–1993), Australian naturalist
- Frederick Gard Fleay (1831–1909), English Shakespeare scholar

== See also ==
- Flea (disambiguation)
- Fleayi (disambiguation)
