= Sainte-Gemmes-d'Andigné =

- Part of Segré-en-Anjou Bleu
- Location of Sainte-Gemmes-d'Andigné
- Location within France Location within Pays de la Loire
- Coordinates: 47°40′32″N 0°53′00″W
- Country: France
- Region: Pays de la Loire
- Department: Maine-et-Loire
- Arrondissement: Segré
- Canton: Segré
- Commune: Segré-en-Anjou Bleu
- Area^{1}: 25.34 km^{2} (9.78 sq mi)
- Elevation: 32 m (105 ft)
- Highest elevation: 62 m (203 ft)
- Lowest elevation: 22 m (72 ft)
- Population (2022): 1,461
  - Density: 57.66/km^{2} (149.3/sq mi)
- Time zone: UTC+01:00 (CET)
  - Summer (DST): UTC+02:00 (CEST)
- Postal code: 49500
- ^{1} French Land Register data, which excludes lakes, ponds, glaciers > 1 km^{2} (0.386 sq mi or 247 acres) and river estuaries.

Sainte-Gemmes-d'Andigné (French pronunciation: [sɛ̃t ʒɛm dɑ̃diɲe], literally Sainte-Gemmes- of Andigné) is a former commune in the Maine-et-Loire department in western France. On 15 December 2016, it was merged into the new commune Segré-en-Anjou Bleu. Its population was 1,461 in 2022.

== Geography ==
The river Oudon forms part of the commune's north-eastern border. The village lies on the right bank of the Verzée, which flows east-northeastward through the commune.

== See also ==
- Communes of the Maine-et-Loire department
