= Muséotrain =

Narrow-gauge heritage railway in Semur-en-Vallon, France

Le petit train de Semur Chemin de Fer de Semur en Vallon
- Locale: Semur-en-Vallon, France
- Coordinates: 48.0167612°N 0.6553027°E
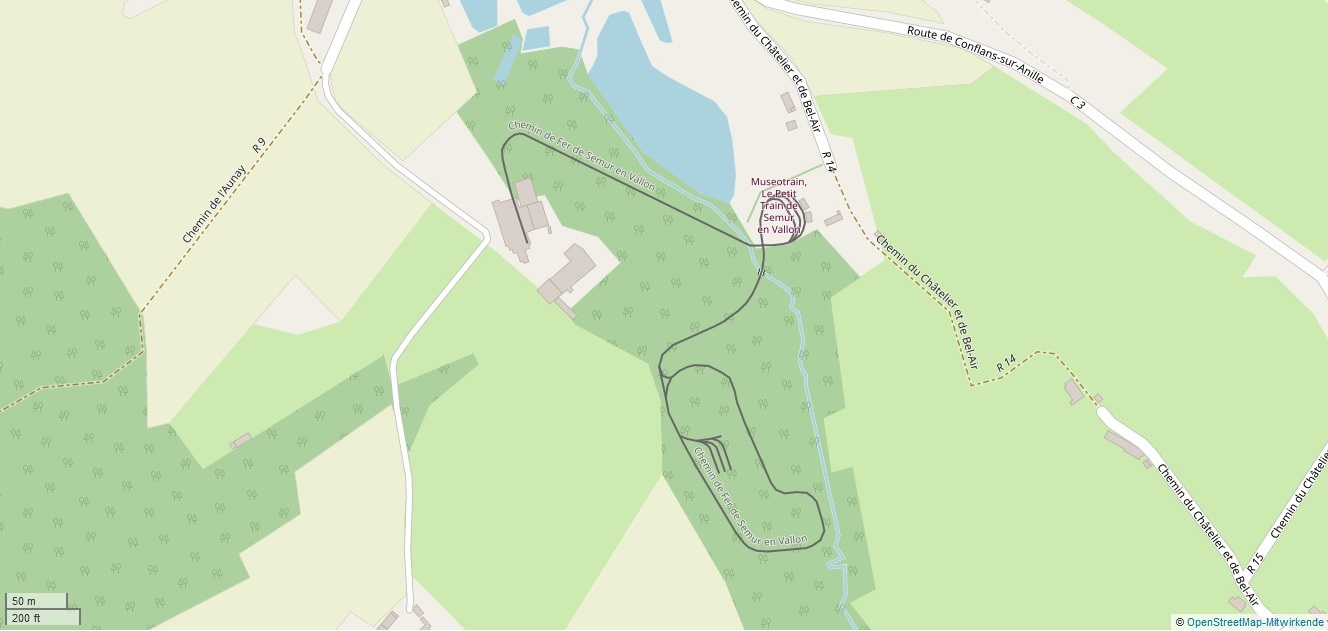
- Map of the route

Commercial operations
- Original gauge: 600 mm (1 ft 11 5/8 in)

Preserved operations
- Owned by: Compagnie du Chemin de Fer de Semur en Vallon
- Operated by: Compagnie du Chemin de Fer de Semur en Vallon
- Stations: 2
- Length: 4 km

Commercial history
- Opened: 1972

The Muséotrain or Le petit Train de Semur is operated by the Compagnie du Chemin de Fer de Semur en Vallon as a 4 km long narrow-gauge heritage railway with a gauge of 600 mm (1 ft 11 5/8 in) in Semur-en-Vallon in France.

== Route ==
The line runs from a three-track station to an engine shed, where historical rolling stock is exhibited, and in the other direction over a crossing to a loop in the forest.

== History ==
In July 1968 a man-made lake with pedal boats and rowing boats as well as for fishing and swimming was put into operation as a leisure attraction. From 1972 onwards, initially only 500 metres long Decauville tracks were laid there, which had previously been salvaged at the Passeneaud company in Mondoubleau. At the beginning of the 1980s, the narrow-gauge railway was extended and a depot and museum for the growing collection of historic rail vehicles was built. A few years later, in 1990, the Muséotrain was created, and in 1995 a real railway station was inaugurated.

== Museum ==
In the 700 square metres (7,500 sq ft) museum building, visitors can take a 180 metres (200 yd) tour of the museum, which includes not only the rail vehicles but also 14 videos, six screenings of old films and three sound rooms. A unique exhibit is the crane bridges from the foundry in Saint-Pavin-des-Champs^{(fr)} near Le Mans, which were originally built in 1850.

== Operation ==
The Muséotrain with 40 seats per train will run daily from 5 July to 30 August 2020 and then on Sundays from 1 to 27 September 2020. For groups, special trips are also possible until the end of October by prior arrangement.
