= Aviré =

- Part of Segré-en-Anjou Bleu
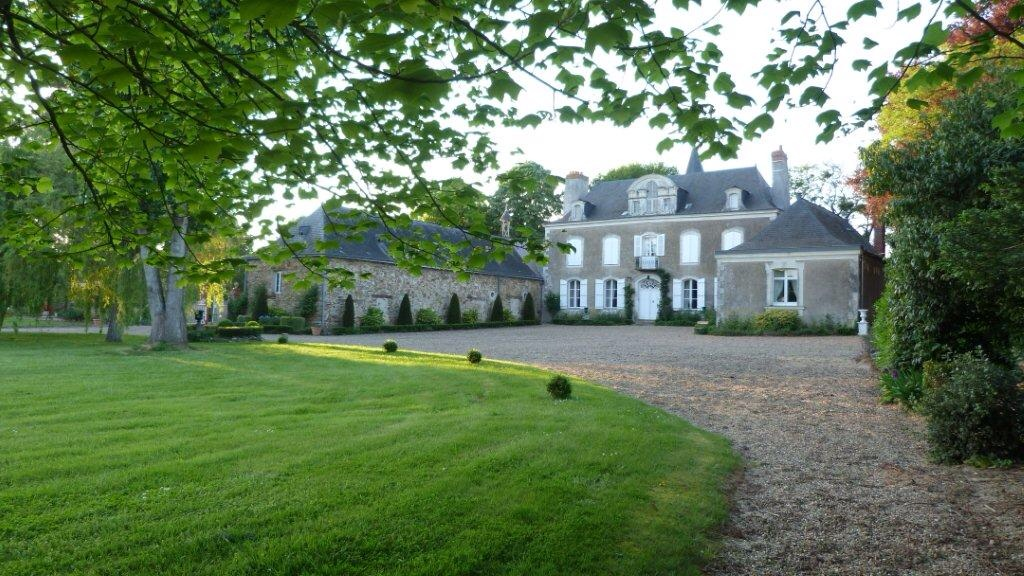
- The Château de La Montchevalleraie
- Location of Aviré
- Location within France Location within Pays de la Loire
- Coordinates: 47°42′25″N 0°47′42″W
- Country: France
- Region: Pays de la Loire
- Department: Maine-et-Loire
- Arrondissement: Segré
- Canton: Segré
- Commune: Segré-en-Anjou Bleu
- Area^{1}: 14.36 km^{2} (5.54 sq mi)
- Elevation: 72 m (236 ft)
- Highest elevation: 87 m (285 ft)
- Lowest elevation: 28 m (92 ft)
- Population (2023): 499
  - Density: 34.7/km^{2} (90.0/sq mi)
- Time zone: UTC+01:00 (CET)
  - Summer (DST): UTC+02:00 (CEST)
- Postal code: 49500
- ^{1} French Land Register data, which excludes lakes, ponds, glaciers > 1 km^{2} (0.386 sq mi or 247 acres) and river estuaries.

Aviré (French pronunciation: [aviʁe]) is a former commune in the Maine-et-Loire department in western France. On 15 December 2016, it was merged into the new commune Segré-en-Anjou Bleu.

== See also ==
- Communes of the Maine-et-Loire department
