= Châtelais =

- Part of Segré-en-Anjou Bleu
- Location of Châtelais
- Location within France Location within Pays de la Loire
- Coordinates: 47°45′30″N 0°55′34″W
- Country: France
- Region: Pays de la Loire
- Department: Maine-et-Loire
- Arrondissement: Segré
- Canton: Segré
- Commune: Segré-en-Anjou Bleu
- Area^{1}: 23.68 km^{2} (9.14 sq mi)
- Elevation: 90 m (300 ft)
- Highest elevation: 102 m (335 ft)
- Lowest elevation: 26 m (85 ft)
- Population (2022): 695
  - Density: 29.3/km^{2} (76.0/sq mi)
- Demonym(s): Châtelaisien, Châtelaisienne
- Time zone: UTC+01:00 (CET)
  - Summer (DST): UTC+02:00 (CEST)
- Postal code: 49520
- ^{1} French Land Register data, which excludes lakes, ponds, glaciers > 1 km^{2} (0.386 sq mi or 247 acres) and river estuaries.

Châtelais (French pronunciation: [ʃatlɛ]) is a former commune in the Maine-et-Loire department of western France. On 15 December 2016, it was merged into the new commune Segré-en-Anjou Bleu.

== Geography ==
The river Oudon flows through the middle of the commune and forms part of its northern border.

== See also ==
- Communes of the Maine-et-Loire department
