= Marans, Maine-et-Loire =

Marans
- Part of Segré-en-Anjou Bleu
- Location of Marans
- Location within France Location within Pays de la Loire
- Coordinates: 47°38′22″N 0°51′27″W
- Country: France
- Region: Pays de la Loire
- Department: Maine-et-Loire
- Arrondissement: Segré
- Canton: Segré
- Commune: Segré-en-Anjou Bleu
- Area^{1}: 9.59 km^{2} (3.70 sq mi)
- Elevation: 39 m (128 ft)
- Highest elevation: 51 m (167 ft)
- Lowest elevation: 26 m (85 ft)
- Population (2022): 497
  - Density: 51.8/km^{2} (134/sq mi)
- Demonym(s): Marantais, Marantaise
- Time zone: UTC+01:00 (CET)
  - Summer (DST): UTC+02:00 (CEST)
- Postal code: 49500
- ^{1} French Land Register data, which excludes lakes, ponds, glaciers > 1 km^{2} (0.386 sq mi or 247 acres) and river estuaries.

Marans (French pronunciation: [maʁɑ̃]) is a former commune in the Maine-et-Loire department in western France. On 15 December 2016, it was merged into the new commune Segré-en-Anjou Bleu.

== See also ==
- Communes of the Maine-et-Loire department
