= Arrondissements of the Maine-et-Loire department =

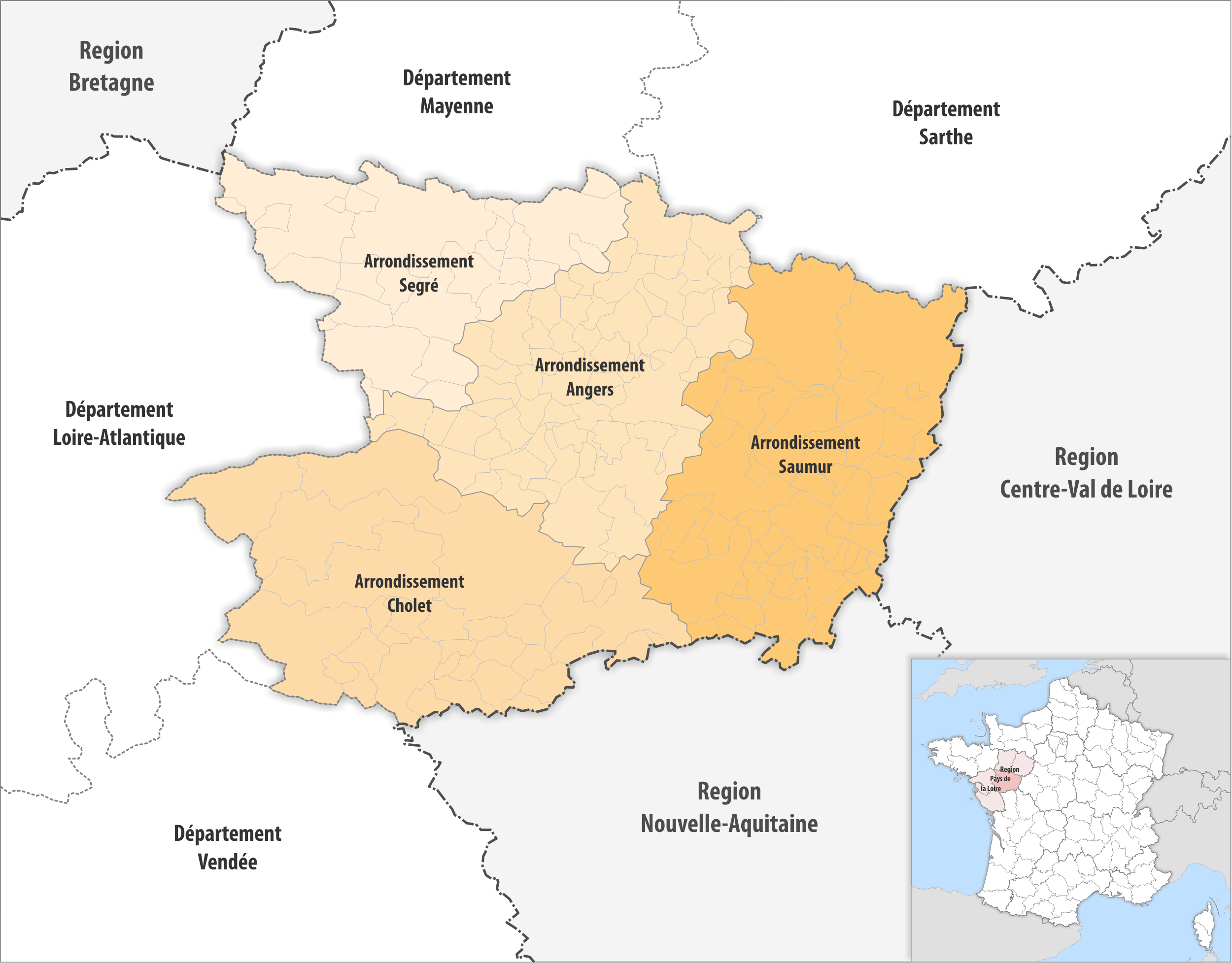
Map of arrondissements of the Maine-et-Loire department.

The 4 arrondissements of the Maine-et-Loire department are:

1. Arrondissement of Angers, (prefecture of the Maine-et-Loire department: Angers) with 66 communes. The population of the arrondissement was 394,646 in 2021.
2. Arrondissement of Cholet, (subprefecture: Cholet) with 32 communes. The population of the arrondissement was 226,096 in 2021.
3. Arrondissement of Saumur, (subprefecture: Saumur) with 52 communes. The population of the arrondissement was 133,080 in 2021.
4. Arrondissement of Segré, (subprefecture: Segré-en-Anjou Bleu) with 26 communes. The population of the arrondissement was 70,921 in 2021.

== History ==
In 1800 the arrondissements of Angers, Baugé, Beaupréau, Saumur and Segré were established. In 1857 Cholet replaced Beaupréau as subprefecture. The arrondissement of Baugé was disbanded in 1926.

The borders of the arrondissements of Maine-et-Loire were modified in January 2017:

- four communes from the arrondissement of Angers to the arrondissement of Saumur
- four communes from the arrondissement of Angers to the arrondissement of Segré
- two communes from the arrondissement of Saumur to the arrondissement of Angers
- nine communes from the arrondissement of Saumur to the arrondissement of Cholet
