= Oudon (river) =

River in France

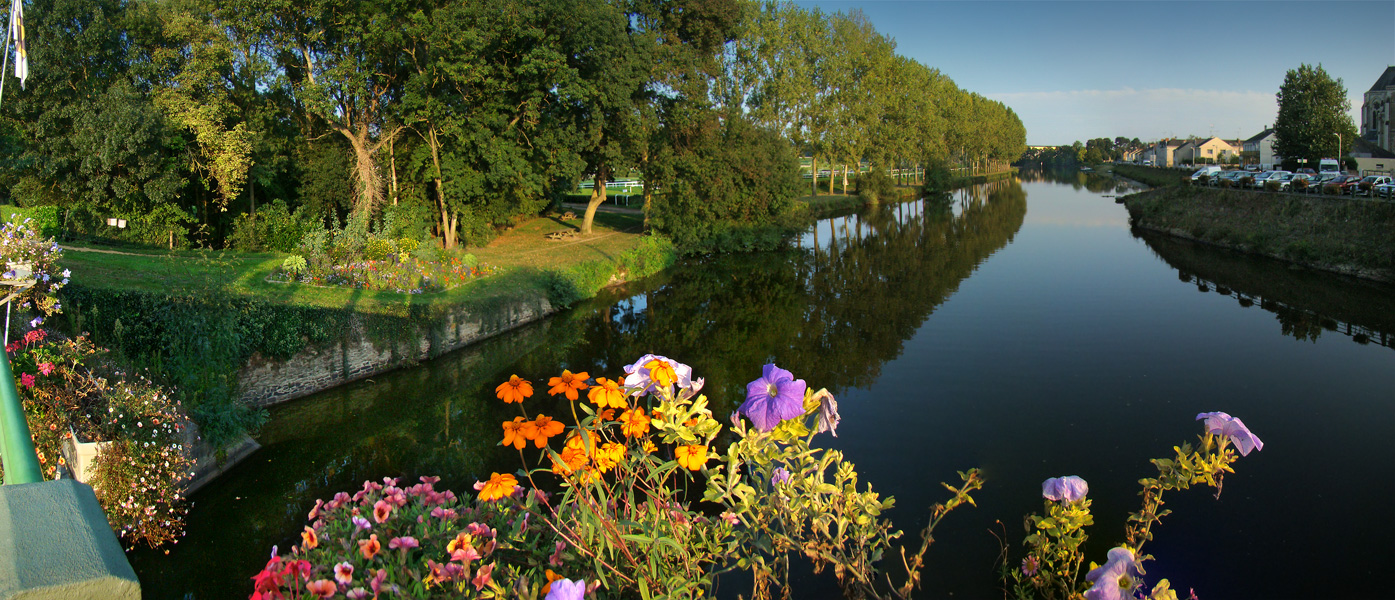
- Sunset on Le Lion-d'Angers

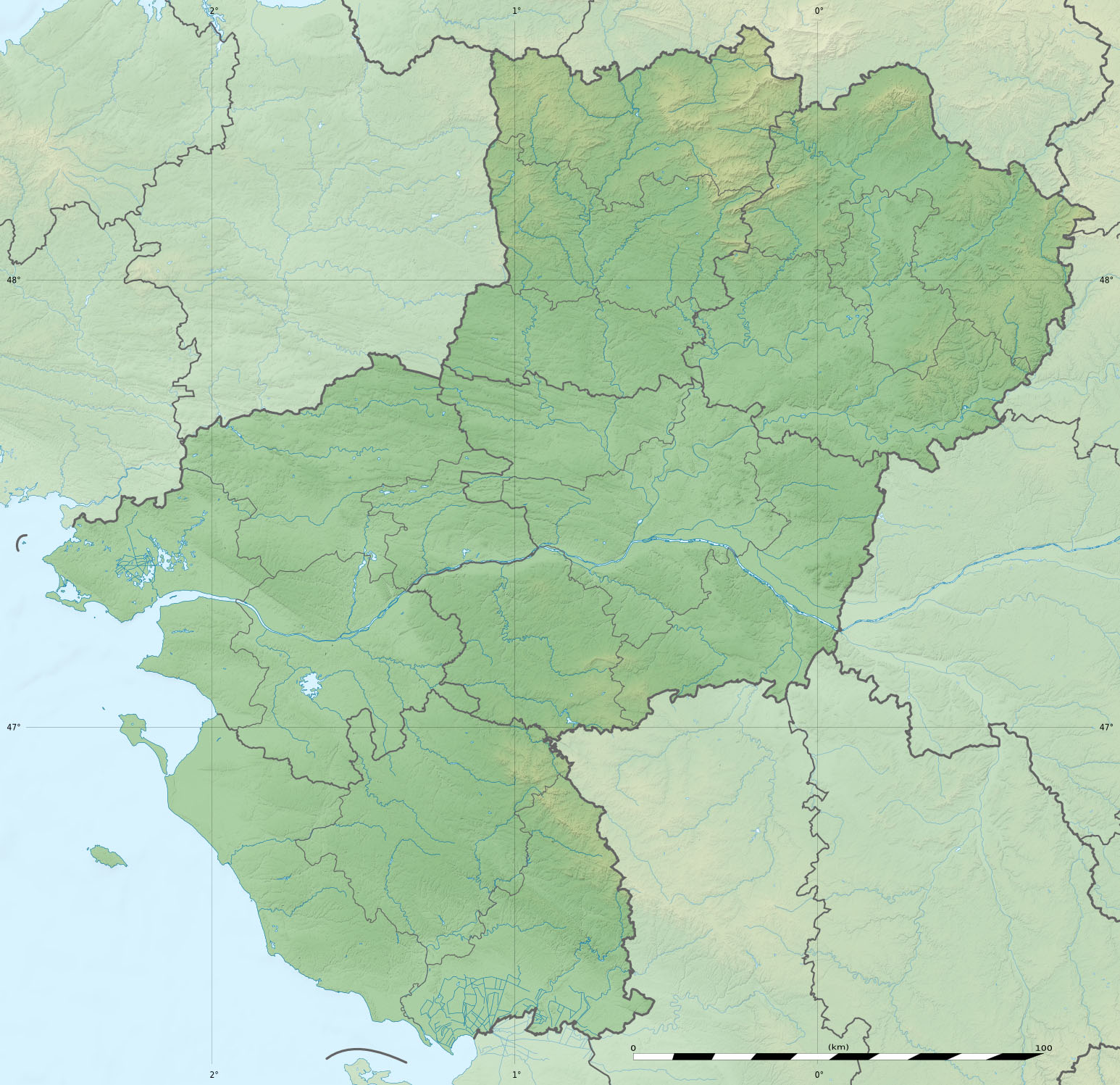
- Location within France Location within Pays de la Loire
- Native name: L'Oudon (French)

Location
- Country: France

Physical characteristics
- Source
  - location: La Gravelle
  - coordinates: 48°04′12″N 01°00′30″W
  - elevation: 150 m (490 ft)
- Mouth
  - location: Mayenne
  - coordinates: 47°36′58″N 0°41′40″W
  - elevation: 18 m (59 ft)
- Length: 103.2 km (64.1 mi)
- Basin size: 1,350 km^{2} (520 sq mi)
- Discharge
  - average: 9.04 m^{3}/s (319 cu ft/s)

Basin features
- Progression: Mayenne→ Maine→ Loire→ Atlantic Ocean

The Oudon (French pronunciation: [udɔ̃]) is a 103.2 km (64.1 mi) long river in the Mayenne and Maine-et-Loire départements, western France. Its source is near La Gravelle. It flows generally south-east. It is a right tributary of the Mayenne into which it flows between Le Lion-d'Angers and Grez-Neuville.

Its main tributary is the Verzée.

== Départements and communes along its course ==
The river flows through the following départements and localities, from source to mouth:

- Mayenne: La Gravelle, Saint-Cyr-le-Gravelais, Ruillé-le-Gravelais, Montjean, Beaulieu-sur-Oudon, Méral, Cossé-le-Vivien, La Chapelle-Craonnaise, Athée, Livré-la-Touche, Craon, Bouchamps-lès-Craon, Chérancé
- Maine-et-Loire: Châtelais, L'Hôtellerie-de-Flée, Nyoiseau, Sainte-Gemmes-d'Andigné, Segré, La Chapelle-sur-Oudon, Andigné, Louvaines, Saint-Martin-du-Bois, Montreuil-sur-Maine, Le Lion-d'Angers and Grez-Neuville

== Navigation ==
The Oudon was canalised in the 19th century from Segré to the river Mayenne, over a distance of 18 km with three locks. The waterway was used to transport timber for construction, granite and slate. The river, restored to navigation in 1980, is now part of the popular Anjou river network, with the Mayenne, Sarthe and their "common trunk" of the Maine down to the river Loire.

== External sources ==
- River Mayenne (River Maine) and River Oudon, with maps and details of places, ports and moorings, by the author of Inland Waterways of France, Imray
- Navigation details for 80 French rivers and canals (French waterways website section)
