= Noyant-la-Gravoyère =

- Part of Segré-en-Anjou Bleu
- Location of Noyant-la-Gravoyère
- Location within France Location within Pays de la Loire
- Coordinates: 47°42′17″N 0°57′14″W
- Country: France
- Region: Pays de la Loire
- Department: Maine-et-Loire
- Arrondissement: Segré
- Canton: Segré
- Commune: Segré-en-Anjou Bleu
- Area^{1}: 11.91 km^{2} (4.60 sq mi)
- Elevation: 97 m (318 ft)
- Highest elevation: 102 m (335 ft)
- Lowest elevation: 32 m (105 ft)
- Population (2021): 1,867
  - Density: 156.8/km^{2} (406.0/sq mi)
- Time zone: UTC+01:00 (CET)
  - Summer (DST): UTC+02:00 (CEST)
- Postal code: 49520
- ^{1} French Land Register data, which excludes lakes, ponds, glaciers > 1 km^{2} (0.386 sq mi or 247 acres) and river estuaries.

Noyant-la-Gravoyère (French pronunciation: [nwajɑ̃ la ɡʁavwajɛʁ]) is a former commune in the Maine-et-Loire department in western France. On 15 December 2016, it was merged into the new commune of Segré-en-Anjou Bleu. Its population was 1,867 in 2021, down from 1,961 in 1962.

== Geography ==
The river Verzée forms part of the commune's southern border. The Mine Bleue slate museum offers visits 126 metres (413 ft) below ground.

== See also ==
- Communes of the Maine-et-Loire department
