= La Chapelle-sur-Oudon =

- Part of Segré-en-Anjou Bleu
- Location of La Chapelle-sur-Oudon
- Location within France Location within Pays de la Loire
- Coordinates: 47°40′46″N 0°49′31″W
- Country: France
- Region: Pays de la Loire
- Department: Maine-et-Loire
- Arrondissement: Segré
- Canton: Segré
- Commune: Segré-en-Anjou Bleu
- Area^{1}: 12.73 km^{2} (4.92 sq mi)
- Elevation: 52 m (171 ft)
- Highest elevation: 68 m (223 ft)
- Lowest elevation: 19 m (62 ft)
- Population (2022): 689
  - Density: 54.1/km^{2} (140/sq mi)
- Demonym(s): Chapellois, Chapelloise
- Time zone: UTC+01:00 (CET)
  - Summer (DST): UTC+02:00 (CEST)
- Postal code: 49500
- ^{1} French Land Register data, which excludes lakes, ponds, glaciers > 1 km^{2} (0.386 sq mi or 247 acres) and river estuaries.

La Chapelle-sur-Oudon (French pronunciation: [la ʃapɛl syʁ udɔ̃], La Chapelle on Oudon) is a former commune in the Maine-et-Loire department of western France. On 15 December 2016, it was merged into the new commune Segré-en-Anjou Bleu.

== Geography ==
The river Oudon forms all of the commune's northern border.

== See also ==
- Communes of the Maine-et-Loire department
