= Grez-Neuville =

- Commune
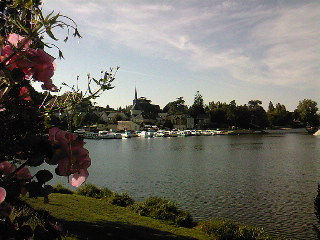
- The Mayenne, the church and the port of Neuville
- Location of Grez-Neuville
- Location within France Location within Pays de la Loire
- Coordinates: 47°36′07″N 0°40′59″W
- Country: France
- Region: Pays de la Loire
- Department: Maine-et-Loire
- Arrondissement: Segré
- Canton: Tiercé

Government
  - Mayor (2020–2026): Pascal Crubleau
- Area^{1}: 48 km^{2} (19 sq mi)
- Highest elevation: 97 m (318 ft)
- Lowest elevation: 16 m (52 ft)
- Population (2023): 1,447
  - Density: 30/km^{2} (78/sq mi)
- Demonym(s): Grez-Neuvillois, Grez-Neuvilloise
- Time zone: UTC+01:00 (CET)
  - Summer (DST): UTC+02:00 (CEST)
- INSEE/Postal code: 49155 /49220
- ^{1} French Land Register data, which excludes lakes, ponds, glaciers > 1 km^{2} (0.386 sq mi or 247 acres) and river estuaries.

Grez-Neuville (French pronunciation: [ɡʁe nøvil]) is a commune in the Maine-et-Loire department in western France.

== Geography ==
The Oudon forms part of the commune's northern border before joining the Mayenne, which flows south through the commune.

== See also ==
- Communes of the Maine-et-Loire department
