= Montguillon =

- Part of Segré-en-Anjou Bleu
- Location of Montguillon
- Location within France Location within Pays de la Loire
- Coordinates: 47°43′43″N 0°44′36″W
- Country: France
- Region: Pays de la Loire
- Department: Maine-et-Loire
- Arrondissement: Segré
- Canton: Segré
- Commune: Segré-en-Anjou Bleu
- Area^{1}: 11.91 km^{2} (4.60 sq mi)
- Elevation: 54 m (177 ft)
- Highest elevation: 87 m (285 ft)
- Lowest elevation: 46 m (151 ft)
- Population (2022): 235
  - Density: 19.7/km^{2} (51.1/sq mi)
- Demonym(s): Montguillonnais, Montguillonnaise
- Time zone: UTC+01:00 (CET)
  - Summer (DST): UTC+02:00 (CEST)
- Postal code: 49500
- ^{1} French Land Register data, which excludes lakes, ponds, glaciers > 1 km^{2} (0.386 sq mi or 247 acres) and river estuaries.

Montguillon (French pronunciation: [mɔ̃ɡijɔ̃]) is a former commune in the Maine-et-Loire department in western France. On 15 December 2016, it was merged into the new commune Segré-en-Anjou Bleu.

== See also ==
- Communes of the Maine-et-Loire department
