= Nyoiseau =

- Part of Segré-en-Anjou Bleu
- Location of Nyoiseau
- Location within France Location within Pays de la Loire
- Coordinates: 47°43′02″N 0°54′54″W
- Country: France
- Region: Pays de la Loire
- Department: Maine-et-Loire
- Arrondissement: Segré
- Canton: Segré
- Commune: Segré-en-Anjou Bleu
- Area^{1}: 15.55 km^{2} (6.00 sq mi)
- Elevation: 53 m (174 ft)
- Highest elevation: 97 m (318 ft)
- Lowest elevation: 22 m (72 ft)
- Population (2022): 1,175
  - Density: 75.56/km^{2} (195.7/sq mi)
- Demonym(s): Nyoisien, Nyoisienne
- Time zone: UTC+01:00 (CET)
  - Summer (DST): UTC+02:00 (CEST)
- Postal code: 49500
- ^{1} French Land Register data, which excludes lakes, ponds, glaciers > 1 km^{2} (0.386 sq mi or 247 acres) and river estuaries.

Nyoiseau (French pronunciation: [niwazo]) is a former commune in the Maine-et-Loire department in western France. On 15 December 2016, it was merged into the new commune Segré-en-Anjou Bleu.

== Geography ==
The river Oudon flows through the middle of the commune and forms part of its northern border.

== See also ==
- Communes of the Maine-et-Loire department
