= Saint-Martin-du-Bois, Maine-et-Loire =

Saint-Martin-du-Bois
- Part of Segré-en-Anjou Bleu
- Location of Saint-Martin-du-Bois
- Location within France Location within Pays de la Loire
- Coordinates: 47°42′24″N 0°44′27″W
- Country: France
- Region: Pays de la Loire
- Department: Maine-et-Loire
- Arrondissement: Segré
- Canton: Segré
- Commune: Segré-en-Anjou Bleu
- Area^{1}: 21.73 km^{2} (8.39 sq mi)
- Elevation: 62 m (203 ft)
- Highest elevation: 83 m (272 ft)
- Lowest elevation: 17 m (56 ft)
- Population (2022): 969
  - Density: 44.6/km^{2} (115/sq mi)
- Time zone: UTC+01:00 (CET)
  - Summer (DST): UTC+02:00 (CEST)
- Postal code: 49500
- ^{1} French Land Register data, which excludes lakes, ponds, glaciers > 1 km^{2} (0.386 sq mi or 247 acres) and river estuaries.

Saint-Martin-du-Bois (French pronunciation: [sɛ̃ maʁtɛ̃ dy bwa]) is a former commune in the Maine-et-Loire department in western France. On 15 December 2016, it was merged into the new commune Segré-en-Anjou Bleu. Its population was 969 in 2022.

== Geography ==
The river Oudon forms the commune's southern border.

== See also ==
- Communes of the Maine-et-Loire department
