= The Carnival Papers =

Studio album by Steve Reynolds
- Released: 3 June 2008
- Recorded: Blackbox Studios; Le Bourg-d'Iré, Pays de la Loire, France
- Genre: Alternative
- Length: 54:01
- Label: 429

The Carnival Papers is the third album by Steve Reynolds. The album was recorded at Blackbox Studios in Le Bourg-d'Iré, Pays de la Loire, France. It was released 3 June 2008 on 429 Records. The song "Mistaken Identity" appears in the season 5 premiere of Grey's Anatomy. Dream a Little Dream of Me aired on ABC 25 September 2008.

== Track listing ==
No.	Title	Length
1.	"Winter Stores"	3:59
2.	"Set Your Sights"	3:21
3.	"Save Your Best"	4:24
4.	"Once in Your Life"	3:40
5.	"For the Last Time (feat. Gemma Hayes)"	4:51
6.	"Coming in Too Low"	6:18
7.	"Cover of Night"	4:33
8.	"House I Built"	4:39
9.	"It's Too Late"	4:04
10.	"Mistaken Identity"	4:05
11.	"We Will Pay"	6:18
12.	"Stage Fright"	3:48
Total length:		54:01

== See also ==
- 2008 in Canadian music
