= Loiron-Ruillé =

- Commune
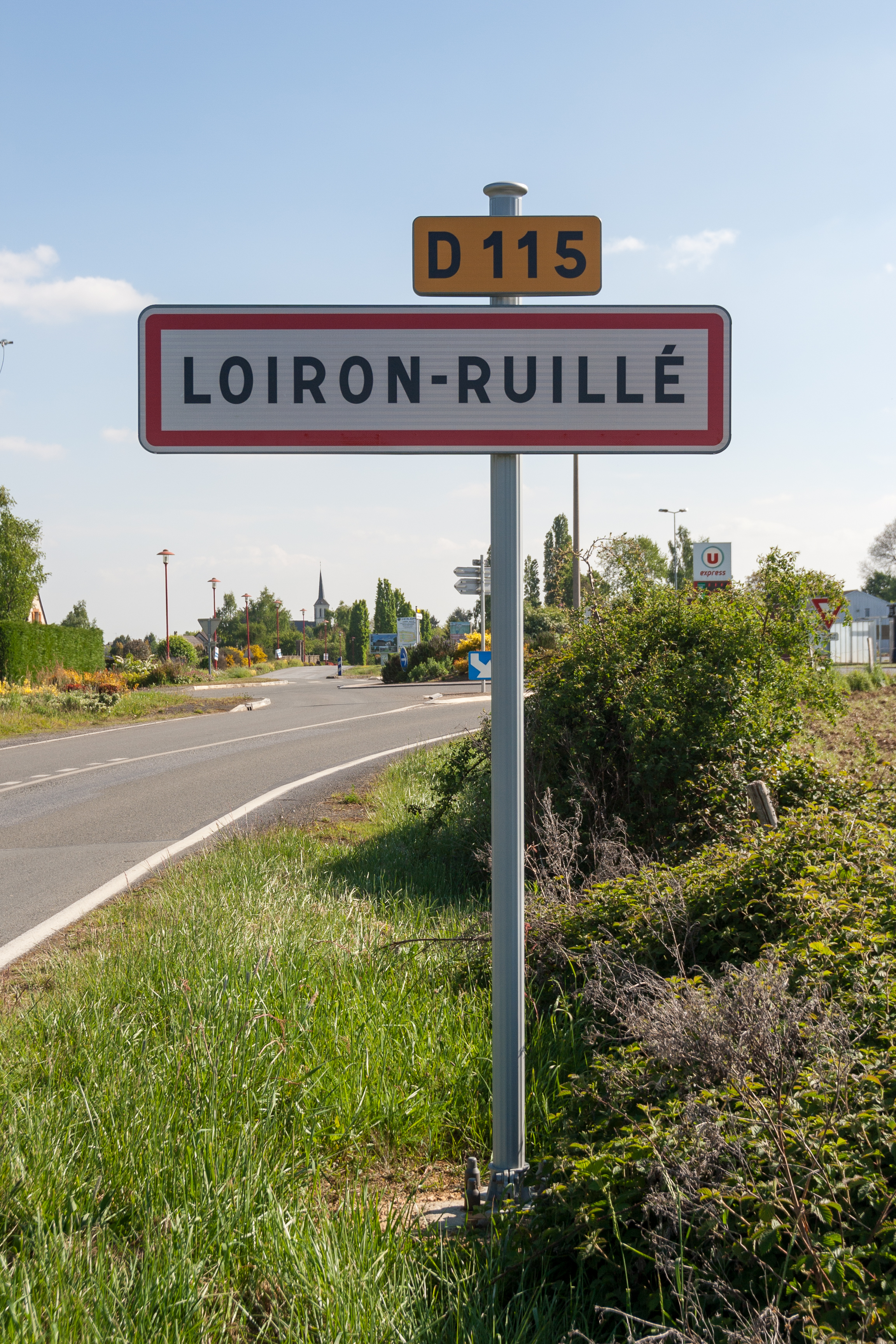
- The road into Loiron-Ruillé
- Location of Loiron-Ruillé
- Location within France Location within Pays de la Loire
- Coordinates: 48°03′36″N 0°56′06″W
- Country: France
- Region: Pays de la Loire
- Department: Mayenne
- Arrondissement: Laval
- Canton: Loiron-Ruillé
- Intercommunality: Laval Agglomération

Government
  - Mayor (2020–2026): Bernard Bourgeais
- Area^{1}: 39.86 km^{2} (15.39 sq mi)
- Population (2023): 2,758
  - Density: 69.19/km^{2} (179.2/sq mi)
- Time zone: UTC+01:00 (CET)
  - Summer (DST): UTC+02:00 (CEST)
- INSEE/Postal code: 53137 /53320
- ^{1} French Land Register data, which excludes lakes, ponds, glaciers > 1 km^{2} (0.386 sq mi or 247 acres) and river estuaries.

Loiron-Ruillé (French pronunciation: [lwaʁɔ̃ ʁɥije]) is a commune in the department of Mayenne, western France. The municipality was established on 1 January 2016 by merger of the former communes of Loiron and Ruillé-le-Gravelais.

== Population ==
Population data refer to the area corresponding with the commune as of January 2025.

Historical population
Year	Pop.	±% p.a.
1968	1,243	—
1975	1,459	+2.32%
1982	1,806	+3.09%
1990	1,884	+0.53%
1999	1,892	+0.05%
2007	2,276	+2.34%
2012	2,442	+1.42%
2017	2,667	+1.78%
2023	2,758	+0.56%
Source: INSEE

== See also ==
- Communes of the Mayenne department
