= Fleadh =

Fleadh is a pre-20th C spelling reform rendering of the Irish word fleá (pronounced [fʲlʲaː]), meaning a festive occasion or banquet. It is used by a number of festivals such as The Philadelphia Fleadh, which have an Irish-originated inspiration. It may also refer to:

- Fleadh Cheoil, an Irish music competition run by Comhaltas Ceoltóirí Éireann.
- Fleadh Nua, an Irish cultural festival.
- Galway Film Fleadh, a cinematography festival.
- TUS Thurles Games Fleadh, a game jam.
