= Flee =

The term flee may refer to:

- Flee (album), an album by Jeremy Spencer
- Flee, or run away, the flight option of the fight-or-flight response
- Flee, withdrawal (military) or retreat from battle
- Flee the Seen, an American band nicknamed "Flee"
- Flee (film), a 2021 Danish animated documentary film

== See also ==
- Flea (disambiguation)
- Flée (disambiguation), several French communes
