= Ruillé-le-Gravelais =

- Part of Loiron-Ruillé
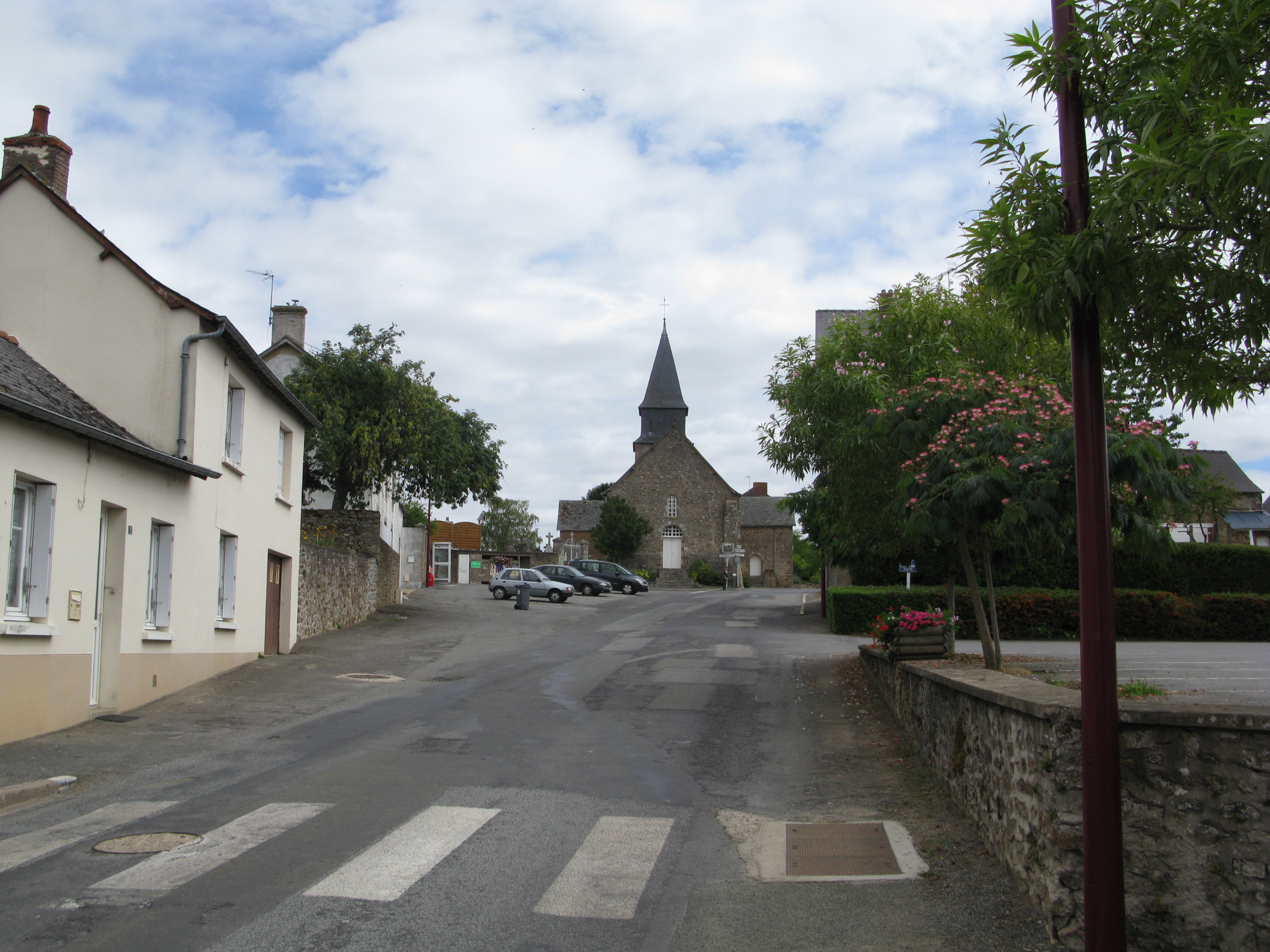
- The church in Ruillé-le-Gravelais

- Coat of arms
- Location of Ruillé-le-Gravelais
- Location within France Location within Pays de la Loire
- Coordinates: 48°03′24″N 0°57′15″W
- Country: France
- Region: Pays de la Loire
- Department: Mayenne
- Arrondissement: Laval
- Canton: Loiron
- Commune: Loiron-Ruillé
- Area^{1}: 16.94 km^{2} (6.54 sq mi)
- Elevation: 105 m (344 ft)
- Highest elevation: 191 m (627 ft)
- Lowest elevation: 90 m (300 ft)
- Population (2022): 927
  - Density: 54.7/km^{2} (142/sq mi)
- Time zone: UTC+01:00 (CET)
  - Summer (DST): UTC+02:00 (CEST)
- Postal code: 53320
- ^{1} French Land Register data, which excludes lakes, ponds, glaciers > 1 km^{2} (0.386 sq mi or 247 acres) and river estuaries.

Ruillé-le-Gravelais (French pronunciation: [ʁɥije lə ɡʁavlɛ]) is a former commune in the Mayenne department in north-western France. On 1 January 2016, it was merged into the new commune of Loiron-Ruillé.

== Geography ==
The river Oudon flows through the middle of the commune and forms part of its southern border.

== See also ==
- Communes of Mayenne
