= L'Hôtellerie-de-Flée =

- Part of Segré-en-Anjou Bleu
- Location of L'Hôtellerie-de-Flée
- Location within France Location within Pays de la Loire
- Coordinates: 47°44′43″N 0°53′18″W
- Country: France
- Region: Pays de la Loire
- Department: Maine-et-Loire
- Arrondissement: Segré
- Canton: Segré
- Commune: Segré-en-Anjou Bleu
- Area^{1}: 14.77 km^{2} (5.70 sq mi)
- Elevation: 75 m (246 ft)
- Highest elevation: 92 m (302 ft)
- Lowest elevation: 26 m (85 ft)
- Population (2022): 537
  - Density: 36.4/km^{2} (94.2/sq mi)
- Time zone: UTC+01:00 (CET)
  - Summer (DST): UTC+02:00 (CEST)
- Postal code: 49500
- ^{1} French Land Register data, which excludes lakes, ponds, glaciers > 1 km^{2} (0.386 sq mi or 247 acres) and river estuaries.

L'Hôtellerie-de-Flée (French pronunciation: [lotɛlʁi də fle]) is a former commune in the Maine-et-Loire department in western France. On 15 December 2016, it was merged into the new commune Segré-en-Anjou Bleu.

== Geography ==
The river Oudon flows through the commune and forms part of its south-western border.

== See also ==
- Communes of the Maine-et-Loire department
