= Flea (disambiguation) =

A flea is a parasitic insect.

Flea may also refer to:

== People ==
- Flea (musician), the stage name of Michael Balzary, bassist of Red Hot Chili Peppers
- Darryl Virostko, professional big wave surfer nicknamed "Flea" from Santa Cruz, California, USA
- Flea, the former alias of Australian hip-hop artist and Lgeez member Alex Jones

== Literature and fiction ==
- The Flea (poem), a poem by John Donne
- The Flea (character), a character from the animated TV series ¡Mucha Lucha!
- The Flea (fairy tale), a fairy tale by Giambattista Basile
- Flea (Chrono Trigger), a video game character
- "Fleas" (poem), a common alias for "Lines on the Antiquity of Microbes"
- "Fleas (The Good Wife)", a first season episode of The Good Wife
- "Fleas", a song by NOFX from Punk in Drublic

== Other uses ==
- Cat flea, Ctenocephalides felis, whose primary host are domestic cats
- Snow flea, small jumping insects in the order Collembola and a term sometimes also used for wingless scorpionflies in the family Boreidae
- Water flea, any of several small aquatic crustacea
- FLEA (psychedelic), a psychedelic phenethylamine
- Fuel fleas, microscopic particles of radioactive nuclear fuel
- Bugaboo (The Flea), a 1983 video game by Paco Portalo and Paco Suarez
- Stir bar, sometimes known as a flea, a bar magnet used as part of a magnetic stirrer to stir solutions in a laboratory

== See also ==
- Flee (disambiguation)
- Fleadh (disambiguation), an archaic spelling of the Irish word fleá, meaning a festive occasion or banquet
