= Steve Reynolds (singer-songwriter) =

- Born: Stephen B. Reynolds; Vancouver, British Columbia, Canada
- Origin: vancouver Canada
- Genres: folk
- Occupation(s): Singer, songwriter, musician
- Instrument(s): Vocals, guitar
- Years active: 1997–present
- Labels: The Cellar Music/Jaded Minstrel Music
- Website: www.thecellarmusic.com

Steve Reynolds is a singer-songwriter from Vancouver, British Columbia. Reynolds was nominated for a 2008 Grammy award for his album, the Carnival Papers. He has released three albums on various record labels. His song "Mistaken Identity" appears in the season 5 premiere for Grey's Anatomy along with dozens of other TV shows, films and ad campaigns.

== History ==
Reynolds was born in Vancouver, British Columbia, Canada and based in Los Angeles and San Pancho, Mexico. He has most recently returned to his hometown, Vancouver. His second album Exile was released 24 January 2006 on 429 Records. Exile was described as "an impressive debut from a well-rounded musician" by Performing Songwriter Magazine. Reynolds' third album The Carnival Papers was released 5 June 2008 on Savoy Records. He also appeared playing "Stage Fright" on the tribute album Endless Highway: The Music of The Band in 2007. His song "Mistaken Identity" appears in the season 5 premiere for Grey's Anatomy.

Recently, he partnered with the Los Angeles and New York-based sync agency The Cellar Music to commemorate the 10th anniversary of The Carnival Papers.

== Discography ==
- 2006: Exile
  1. "Intro" – 0:44
  2. "Happy" – 2:48
  3. "Dear Rose" – 4:19
  4. "That Old Love" – 4:23
  5. "Market Fool" – 3:47
  6. "Only Son" – 4:31
  7. "Miner's Lamp" – 3:47
  8. "Forsaken" – 3:28
  9. "Painter and Son" – 3:59
  10. "Satellite" – 4:10
  11. "Static" – 4:21
  12. "Exile" – 4:10
- 2008: The Carnival Papers
- 2018: The Carnival Papers Anniversary Release
- 2021: See the Sun

== See also ==
- List of Canadian musicians
