= Le Lion-d'Angers =

- Commune
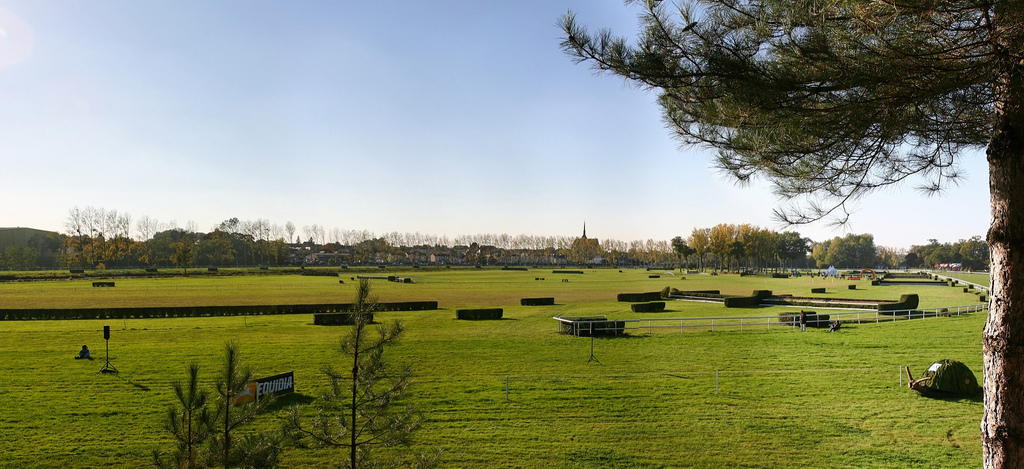
- A general view of Le Lion-d'Angers

- Coat of arms
- Location of Le Lion-d'Angers
- Location within France Location within Pays de la Loire
- Coordinates: 47°37′43″N 0°42′42″W
- Country: France
- Region: Pays de la Loire
- Department: Maine-et-Loire
- Arrondissement: Segré
- Canton: Tiercé
- Intercommunality: Vallées du Haut-Anjou

Government
  - Mayor (2020–2026): Étienne Glémot
- Area^{1}: 47.74 km^{2} (18.43 sq mi)
- Elevation: 13 m (43 ft)
- Highest elevation: 78 m (256 ft)
- Lowest elevation: 17 m (56 ft)
- Population (2023): 5,390
  - Density: 113/km^{2} (292/sq mi)
- Demonym(s): Lionnais, Lionnaise
- Time zone: UTC+01:00 (CET)
  - Summer (DST): UTC+02:00 (CEST)
- INSEE/Postal code: 49176 /49220
- ^{1} French Land Register data, which excludes lakes, ponds, glaciers > 1 km^{2} (0.386 sq mi or 247 acres) and river estuaries.

Le Lion-d'Angers (French pronunciation: [lə ljɔ̃ dɑ̃ʒe]) is a commune in the Maine-et-Loire department in western France. On 1 January 2016, the former commune of Andigné was merged into Le Lion-d'Angers.

== Geography ==
The river Oudon forms part of the commune's southern border before joining the river Mayenne, which forms part of the commune's eastern border.

== Population ==
The population data given in the table below refer to the commune in its geography as of January 2025.

Historical population
Year	Pop.	±% p.a.
1968	2,478	—
1975	2,569	+0.52%
1982	2,983	+2.16%
1990	3,362	+1.51%
1999	3,609	+0.79%
2007	3,989	+1.26%
2012	4,268	+1.36%
2017	4,924	+2.90%
2023	5,390	+1.52%
Source: INSEE

== See also ==
- Communes of the Maine-et-Loire department
