= Segré =

Commune in Maine-et-Loire, France

- Part of Segré-en-Anjou Bleu
- Coat of arms
- Location of Segré
- Location within France Location within Pays de la Loire
- Coordinates: 47°41′14″N 0°52′15″W
- Country: France
- Region: Pays de la Loire
- Department: Maine-et-Loire
- Arrondissement: Segré
- Canton: Segré
- Commune: Segré-en-Anjou Bleu
- Area^{1}: 15.87 km^{2} (6.13 sq mi)
- Elevation: 31 m (102 ft)
- Highest elevation: 92 m (302 ft)
- Lowest elevation: 22 m (72 ft)
- Population (2022): 6,959
  - Density: 438.5/km^{2} (1,136/sq mi)
- Time zone: UTC+01:00 (CET)
  - Summer (DST): UTC+02:00 (CEST)
- Postal code: 49500
- ^{1} French Land Register data, which excludes lakes, ponds, glaciers > 1 km^{2} (0.386 sq mi or 247 acres) and river estuaries.

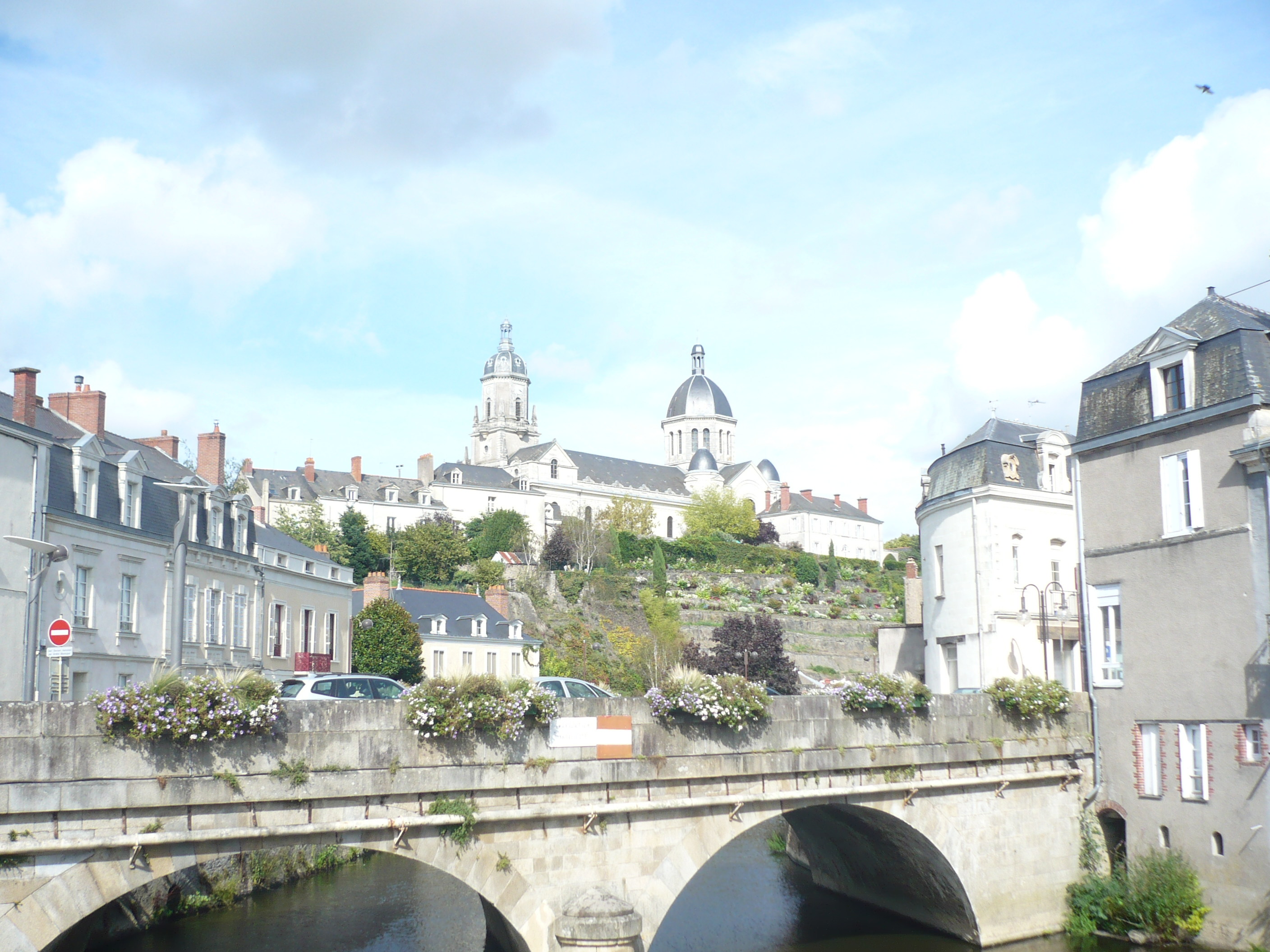
Segré - Eglise - Vue depuis le vieux pont

Segré (French: [səɡʁe]) is a former commune in the Maine-et-Loire department in western France. On 15 December 2016, it was merged into the new commune Segré-en-Anjou Bleu. There is a subprefecture of the Maine-et-Loire department in Segré.

== Geography ==
In the town of Segré, the Verzée flows into the Oudon.

== Twin towns ==
- (England) Ferndown, Dorset, United Kingdom

== See also ==
- Communes of the Maine-et-Loire department
