= Louvaines =

- Part of Segré-en-Anjou Bleu
- Location of Louvaines
- Location within France Location within Pays de la Loire
- Coordinates: 47°41′33″N 0°48′04″W
- Country: France
- Region: Pays de la Loire
- Department: Maine-et-Loire
- Arrondissement: Segré
- Canton: Segré
- Commune: Segré-en-Anjou Bleu
- Area^{1}: 15.07 km^{2} (5.82 sq mi)
- Elevation: 27 m (89 ft)
- Highest elevation: 78 m (256 ft)
- Lowest elevation: 18 m (59 ft)
- Population (2022): 497
  - Density: 33.0/km^{2} (85.4/sq mi)
- Demonym(s): Louvenois, Louvenoise
- Time zone: UTC+01:00 (CET)
  - Summer (DST): UTC+02:00 (CEST)
- Postal code: 49500
- ^{1} French Land Register data, which excludes lakes, ponds, glaciers > 1 km^{2} (0.386 sq mi or 247 acres) and river estuaries.

Louvaines (French pronunciation: [luvɛn]) is a former commune in the Maine-et-Loire department in western France. On 15 December 2016, it was merged into the new commune Segré-en-Anjou Bleu.

== Geography ==
The river Oudon forms all of the commune's southern border.

== See also ==
- Communes of the Maine-et-Loire department
- Owen Franklin Aldis, an American lawyer, died in Louvaines.
