= Le Val-Larrey =

- Commune
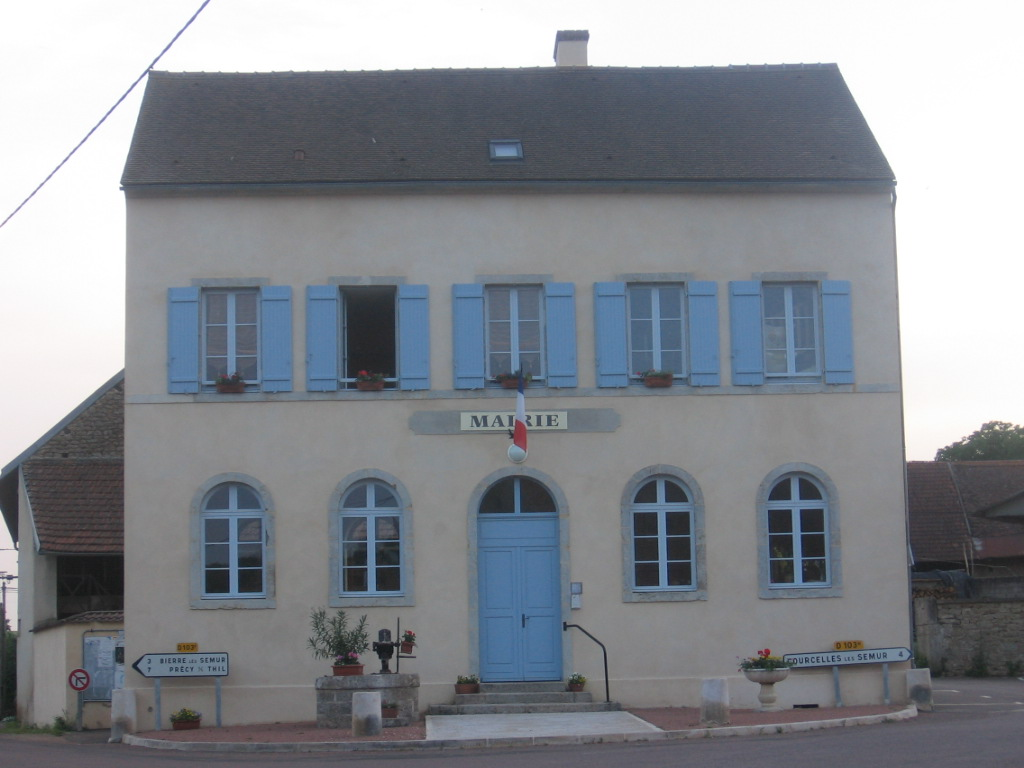
- Town hall in Flée
- Location of Le Val-Larrey
- Location within France Location within Bourgogne-Franche-Comté
- Coordinates: 47°26′10″N 4°19′47″E
- Country: France
- Region: Bourgogne-Franche-Comté
- Department: Côte-d'Or
- Arrondissement: Montbard
- Canton: Semur-en-Auxois
- Intercommunality: Terres d'Auxois

Government
  - Mayor (2020–2026): Samuel Galaud
- Area^{1}: 20.02 km^{2} (7.73 sq mi)
- Highest elevation: 386 m (1,266 ft)
- Lowest elevation: 285 m (935 ft)
- Population (2023): 275
  - Density: 13.7/km^{2} (35.6/sq mi)
- Time zone: UTC+01:00 (CET)
  - Summer (DST): UTC+02:00 (CEST)
- INSEE/Postal code: 21272 /21140
- ^{1} French Land Register data, which excludes lakes, ponds, glaciers > 1 km^{2} (0.386 sq mi or 247 acres) and river estuaries.

Le Val-Larrey (French pronunciation: [lə val laʁɛ]) is a commune in the Côte-d'Or department in eastern France. It was established on 1 January 2019 by merger of the former communes of Flée (the seat) and Bierre-lès-Semur.

== See also ==
- Communes of the Côte-d'Or department
