= Saint-Sauveur-de-Flée =

- Part of Segré-en-Anjou Bleu
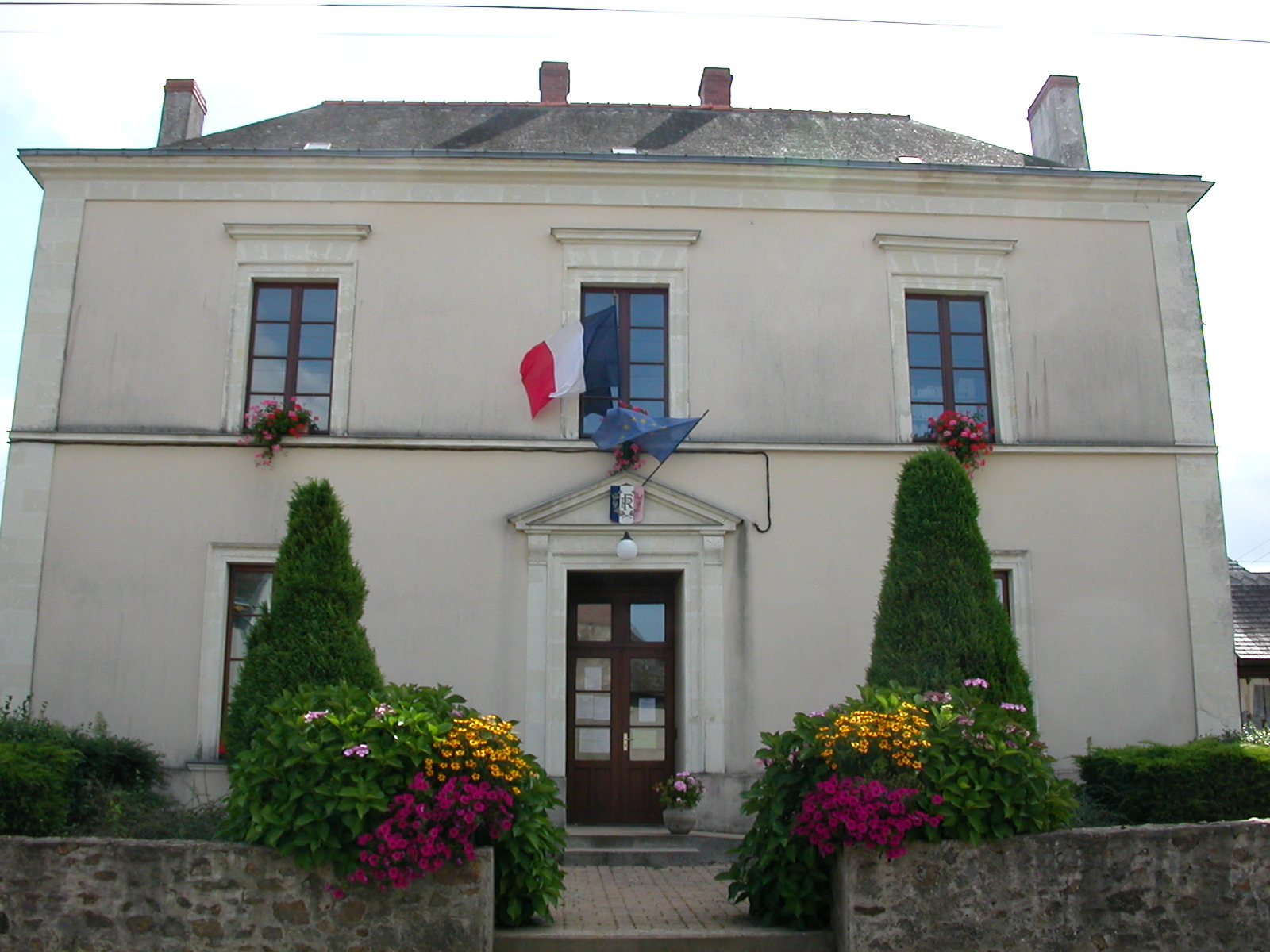
- Town hall
- Location of Saint-Sauveur-de-Flée
- Location within France Location within Pays de la Loire
- Coordinates: 47°45′16″N 0°47′27″W
- Country: France
- Region: Pays de la Loire
- Department: Maine-et-Loire
- Arrondissement: Segré
- Canton: Segré
- Commune: Segré-en-Anjou Bleu
- Area^{1}: 12.87 km^{2} (4.97 sq mi)
- Elevation: 80 m (260 ft)
- Highest elevation: 86 m (282 ft)
- Lowest elevation: 42 m (138 ft)
- Population (2022): 313
  - Density: 24.3/km^{2} (63.0/sq mi)
- Time zone: UTC+01:00 (CET)
  - Summer (DST): UTC+02:00 (CEST)
- Postal code: 49500
- ^{1} French Land Register data, which excludes lakes, ponds, glaciers > 1 km^{2} (0.386 sq mi or 247 acres) and river estuaries.

Saint-Sauveur-de-Flée (French pronunciation: [sɛ̃ sovœʁ də fle]) is a former commune in the Maine-et-Loire department in western France. On 15 December 2016, it was merged into the new commune Segré-en-Anjou Bleu. Its population was 313 in 2022.

== See also ==
- Communes of the Maine-et-Loire department
