= Loiron =

Commune in Mayenne, France

- Part of Loiron-Ruillé
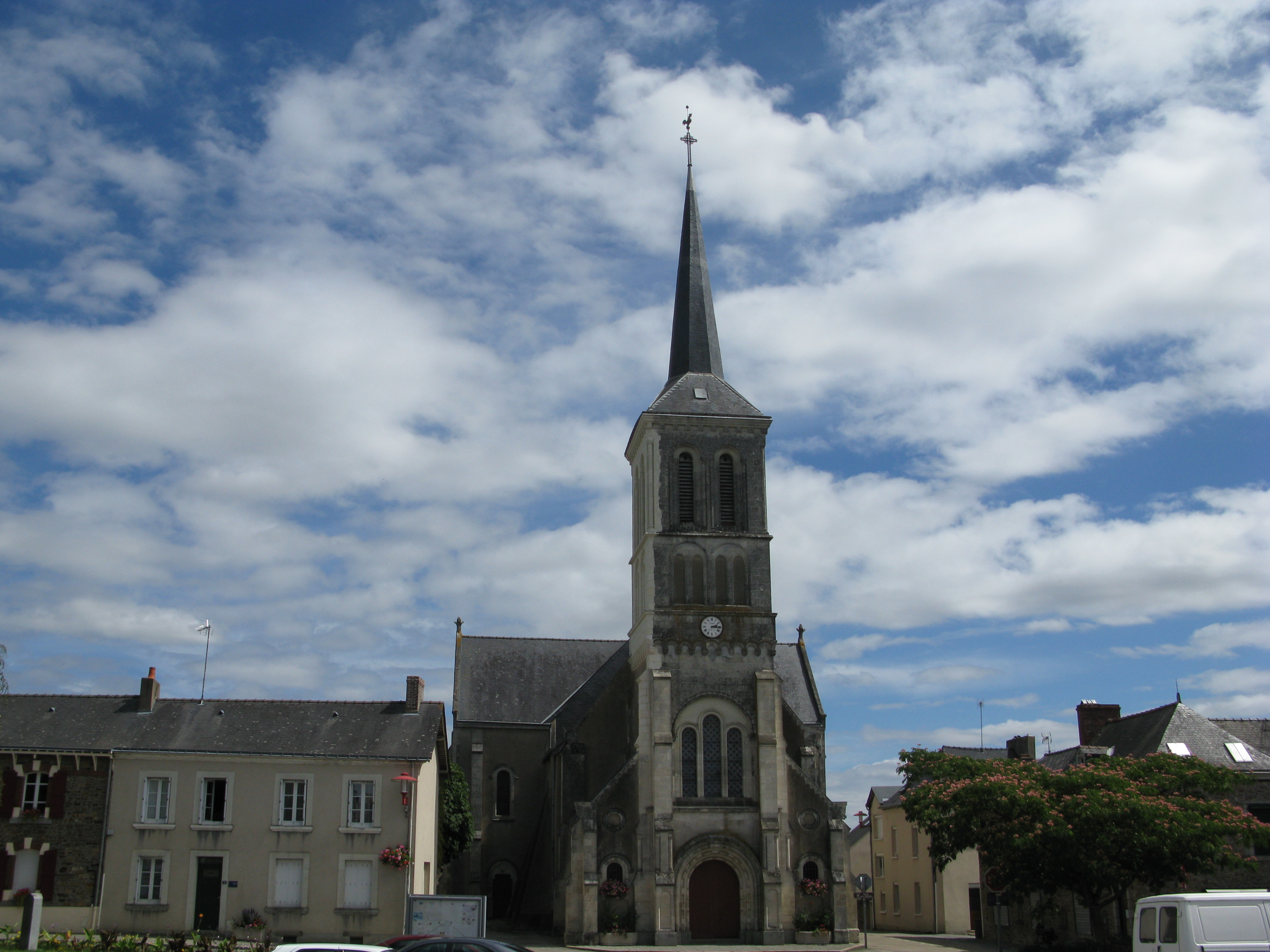
- The church of Saint-Gervais and Saint-Protais

- Coat of arms
- Location of Loiron
- Location within France Location within Pays de la Loire
- Coordinates: 48°03′36″N 0°56′02″W
- Country: France
- Region: Pays de la Loire
- Department: Mayenne
- Arrondissement: Laval
- Canton: Loiron
- Commune: Loiron-Ruillé
- Area^{1}: 22.92 km^{2} (8.85 sq mi)
- Elevation: 140 m (460 ft)
- Highest elevation: 172 m (564 ft)
- Lowest elevation: 88 m (289 ft)
- Population (2022): 1,797
  - Density: 78.40/km^{2} (203.1/sq mi)
- Time zone: UTC+01:00 (CET)
  - Summer (DST): UTC+02:00 (CEST)
- Postal code: 53320
- ^{1} French Land Register data, which excludes lakes, ponds, glaciers > 1 km^{2} (0.386 sq mi or 247 acres) and river estuaries.

Loiron (French pronunciation: [lwaʁɔ̃]) is a former commune in the Mayenne department in north-western France. On 1 January 2016, it was merged into the new commune of Loiron-Ruillé.

== See also ==
- Communes of the Mayenne department
