= Andigné =

- Part of Le Lion-d'Angers
- Location of Andigné
- Location within France Location within Pays de la Loire
- Coordinates: 47°39′59″N 0°46′46″W
- Country: France
- Region: Pays de la Loire
- Department: Maine-et-Loire
- Arrondissement: Segré
- Canton: Tiercé
- Commune: Le Lion-d'Angers
- Area^{1}: 6.63 km^{2} (2.56 sq mi)
- Elevation: 53 m (174 ft)
- Highest elevation: 61 m (200 ft)
- Lowest elevation: 18 m (59 ft)
- Population (2023): 476
  - Density: 71.8/km^{2} (186/sq mi)
- Time zone: UTC+01:00 (CET)
  - Summer (DST): UTC+02:00 (CEST)
- Postal code: 49220
- ^{1} French Land Register data, which excludes lakes, ponds, glaciers > 1 km^{2} (0.386 sq mi or 247 acres) and river estuaries.

Andigné (French pronunciation: [ɑ̃diɲe]) is a former commune in the Maine-et-Loire department in western France. On 1 January 2016, it was merged into the commune of Le Lion-d'Angers.

== Geography ==
The river Oudon forms all of the commune's northern border.

== See also ==
- Communes of the Maine-et-Loire department
