= Le Bourg-d'Iré =

- Part of Segré-en-Anjou Bleu
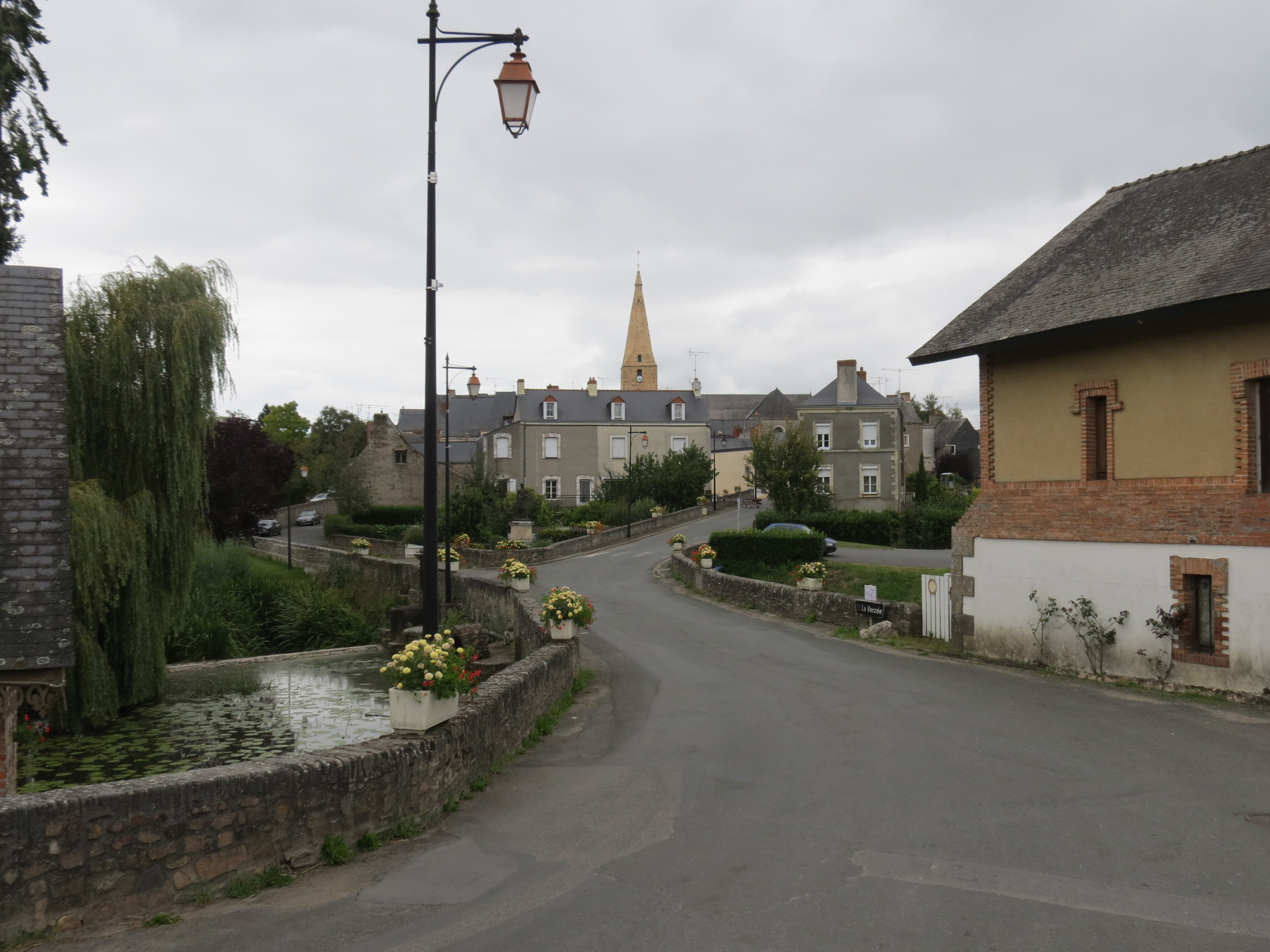
- A general view of Le Bourg-d'Iré
- Location of Le Bourg-d'Iré
- Location within France Location within Pays de la Loire
- Coordinates: 47°40′52″N 0°57′57″W
- Country: France
- Region: Pays de la Loire
- Department: Maine-et-Loire
- Arrondissement: Segré
- Canton: Segré
- Commune: Segré-en-Anjou Bleu
- Area^{1}: 23.03 km^{2} (8.89 sq mi)
- Elevation: 64 m (210 ft)
- Highest elevation: 96 m (315 ft)
- Lowest elevation: 27 m (89 ft)
- Population (2023): 848
  - Density: 36.8/km^{2} (95.4/sq mi)
- Time zone: UTC+01:00 (CET)
  - Summer (DST): UTC+02:00 (CEST)
- Postal code: 49520
- ^{1} French Land Register data, which excludes lakes, ponds, glaciers > 1 km^{2} (0.386 sq mi or 247 acres) and river estuaries.

Le Bourg-d'Iré (French pronunciation: [lə buʁ diʁe]) is a former commune in the Maine-et-Loire department in western France. On 15 December 2016, it was merged into the new commune Segré-en-Anjou Bleu.

== Geography ==
The river Verzée forms part of the commune's northwestern border, then flows east-southeast through the commune and crosses the village.

== See also ==
- Communes of the Maine-et-Loire department
