= Bierre-lès-Semur =

- Part of Le Val-Larrey
- Location of Bierre-lès-Semur
- Location within France Location within Bourgogne-Franche-Comté
- Coordinates: 47°25′13″N 4°18′05″E
- Country: France
- Region: Bourgogne-Franche-Comté
- Department: Côte-d'Or
- Arrondissement: Montbard
- Canton: Semur-en-Auxois
- Commune: Le Val-Larrey
- Area^{1}: 8.28 km^{2} (3.20 sq mi)
- Elevation: 360 m (1,180 ft)
- Highest elevation: 386 m (1,266 ft)
- Lowest elevation: 307 m (1,007 ft)
- Population (2023): 106
  - Density: 12.8/km^{2} (33.2/sq mi)
- Time zone: UTC+01:00 (CET)
  - Summer (DST): UTC+02:00 (CEST)
- Postal code: 21390
- ^{1} French Land Register data, which excludes lakes, ponds, glaciers > 1 km^{2} (0.386 sq mi or 247 acres) and river estuaries.

Bierre-lès-Semur (French pronunciation: [bjɛʁ lɛ səmyʁ], literally Bierre near Semur) is a former commune in the Côte-d'Or department in eastern France. On 1 January 2019, it was merged into the commune Le Val-Larrey.

== See also ==
- Communes of the Côte-d'Or department
