= Fleayi =

Fleayi is the Latinized spelling of David Fleay's surname, and may refer to:

- David Fleay
- Fleay's Barred Frog (Mixophyes fleayi)
- Tasmanian Wedge-tailed Eagle (Aquala audax fleayii)
