= Games Fleadh =

Video game development convention in Ireland

Games Fleadh (Irish for "games festival"), is a 2-day mid-week convention held annually in LIT-Tipperary (formally Tipperary Institute) for computer games enthusiasts and developers to showcase their talent and programming skills. It is usually held in early March and is partially funded by LIT-Tipperary's Centre for Entertainment & Game Technology Research. Additional supporters include Microsoft, EA, and Demonware.

== History ==
Games Fleadh was originally a competition called RoboCode Ireland Challenge, which was an artificial intelligence programming language challenge for first year college students. Teams of students designed a robot that would compete against another colleges robot, and with the robot with the best algorithm receiving the Robocode Marshal title. As this competition grew, Games Fleadh was established as an overarching event.

Games Fleadh started in 2008, by the festivals driving force Philip Bourke, a lecturer of Games Design and Development at LIT-Tipperary, when he saw no other strong festival for the growing Irish Games design industry. It started off small, with a small number of colleges being invited to participate. RoboCode is now an event inside the convention of Games Fleadh.

Since 2014, Dr Liam Noonan, a lecturer in the Limerick IT Campus, has taken over coordination of this event and with the support of other third level Irish colleges, students every year design and develop games based around a theme.

== Events ==
=== Competitions and challenges ===
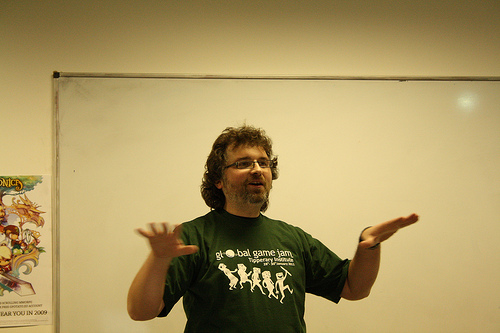
Philip Bourke, a lecturer of Games Design and Development at LIT-Tipperary, at Global Games Jam 2011

The challenge competitions are judged by 3rd party industry professionals. Previous Judges have been from Microsoft, EA, Havok, Playfirst, NeverMind Games, and OpenEmotion Studios.

- Microsoft Game Studio Ireland Challenge – students are set a task of designing a game. This game is judged on game play and originality around a specific theme.
- RoboCode Ireland Challenge – first years from different colleges and universities from around Ireland fight for supremacy over everyone with their robot.

=== Other events ===
- GamesPro - a series of games and software developer panels that give small talks on a specific point from their prospective.
- Global Game Jam (GGJ) - a group challenge in which game developers build computer games in forty eight hours.
- Games Fleadh:Evolved.
- Games Fleadh:Expo - purported to include Ireland's first Digital Game Expo, the exhibit is expected to include indie developer titles.
- Engineers Ireland Game Developer Awards - an awards show acknowledging the best games which are developed in Ireland.

== Themes ==
Over the years there has been a number of different themes which typically revolve around the anniversary of a game.

- 2018 Platformer
- 2017 Shoot 'Em Up
- 2016 Tower Defence
- 2015 Endless runner
- 2014 Hitchhikers Guide to the Galaxy
- 2013- Robot Tank
- 2012– Chopper Command.
- 2011– Frogger.
- 2010– Pac-Man.
- 2009– Asteroids.
- 2008– Space Invaders.

== Honours list ==
Robocode Ireland Challenge Champions

- University of Limerick (2016)
- University of Limerick (2015)
- University of Limerick (2014)
- National University of Ireland, Maynooth (2013)
- Dundalk Institute of Technology (2012)
- Dundalk Institute of Technology (2011)
- University of Limerick (2010)
- Trinity College Dublin (2009)
- Griffith College Dublin (2008)
- Dublin Institute of Technology (2007)
- Cork Institute of Technology (2006)
- LIT-Tipperary formally Tipperary Institute (2005)
- Waterford Institute of Technology (2004)

XNA Game Studio Ireland Challenge/Game Studio Ireland Challenge

- Institute of Technology, Carlow (2016)
- Institute of Technology, Carlow (2015)
- LIT-Tipperary (2013)
- Queen's University, Belfast (2012)
- Dublin Institute of Technology (2011)
- National University of Ireland Galway (2010)
- Dublin Institute of Technology (2009)

DirectX Ireland Challenge Honours List:

- LIT-Tipperary (2013)
- LIT-Tipperary (2012)
- National University of Ireland Galway (2011)
