= Segré-en-Anjou Bleu =

- Subprefecture and commune
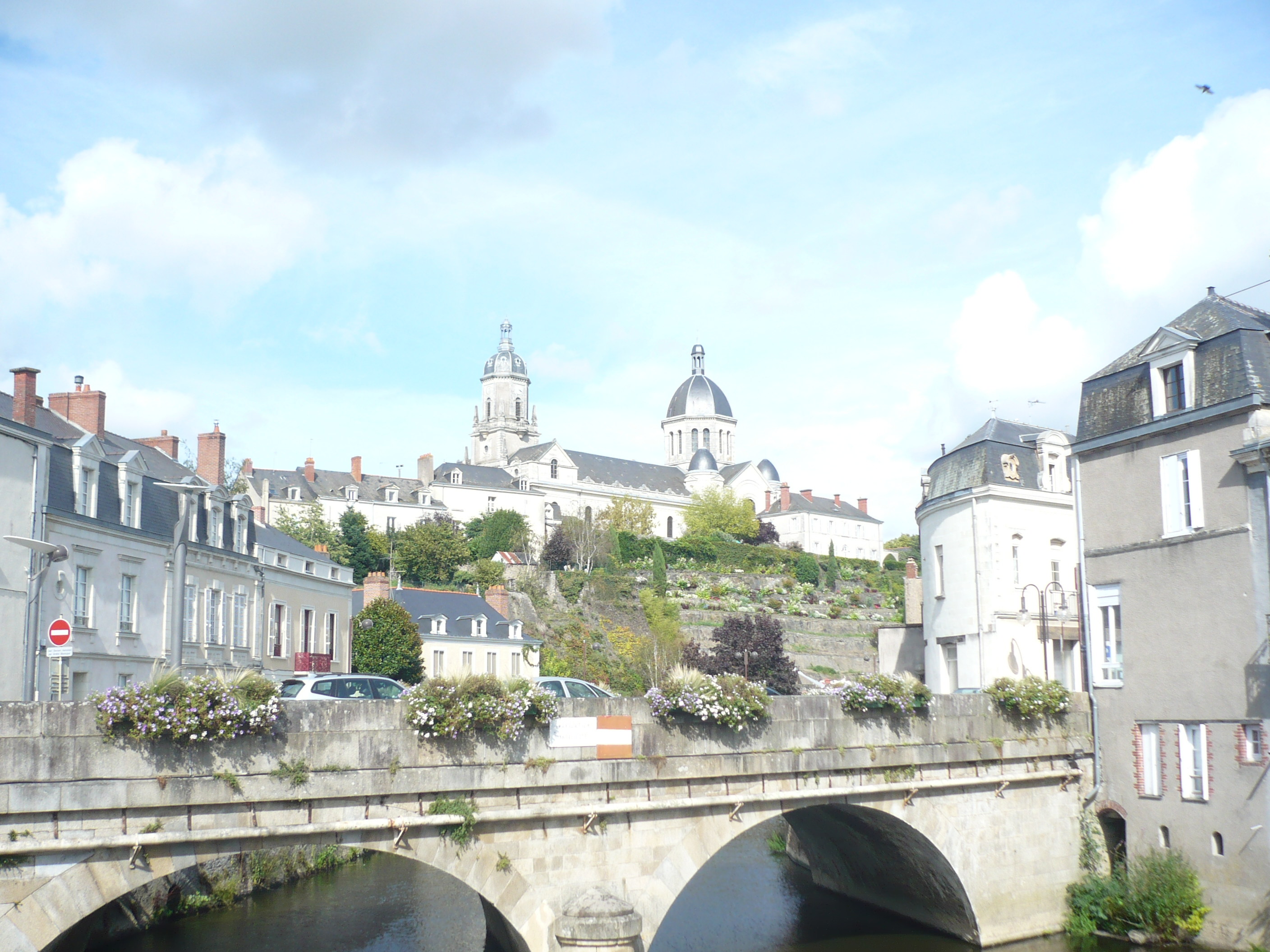
- The church in Segré
- Location of Segré-en-Anjou Bleu
- Location within France Location within Pays de la Loire
- Coordinates: 47°41′13″N 0°52′16″W
- Country: France
- Region: Pays de la Loire
- Department: Maine-et-Loire
- Arrondissement: Segré
- Canton: Segré-en-Anjou Bleu
- Intercommunality: Anjou Bleu Communauté

Government
  - Mayor (2020–2026): Geneviève Coquereau
- Area^{1}: 241.53 km^{2} (93.26 sq mi)
- Population (2023): 17,667
  - Density: 73.146/km^{2} (189.45/sq mi)
- Time zone: UTC+01:00 (CET)
  - Summer (DST): UTC+02:00 (CEST)
- INSEE/Postal code: 49331 /49500, 49520
- ^{1} French Land Register data, which excludes lakes, ponds, glaciers > 1 km^{2} (0.386 sq mi or 247 acres) and river estuaries.

Segré-en-Anjou Bleu (French pronunciation: [səɡʁe ɑ̃.n‿ɑ̃ʒu blø], lit. 'Segré in Blue Anjou') is a commune in the Maine-et-Loire department of western France. The municipality was established on 15 December 2016 and consists of the former communes of Aviré, Le Bourg-d'Iré, La Chapelle-sur-Oudon, Châtelais, La Ferrière-de-Flée, L'Hôtellerie-de-Flée, Louvaines, Marans, Montguillon, Noyant-la-Gravoyère, Nyoiseau, Sainte-Gemmes-d'Andigné, Saint-Martin-du-Bois, Saint-Sauveur-de-Flée and Segré. It is a subprefecture of the Maine-et-Loire department. The only hospitals are Hospital Pole Santé, Rue Cugnot & Centre Haut Anjou

== Population ==
Historical population
Year	Pop.	±% p.a.
1968	16,168	—
1975	16,411	+0.21%
1982	16,437	+0.02%
1990	15,693	−0.58%
1999	15,564	−0.09%
2007	16,610	+0.82%
2012	17,388	+0.92%
2017	17,562	+0.20%
2023	17,667	+0.10%
Populations of the area corresponding with the commune of Segré-en-Anjou Bleu at 1 January 2025. Source: INSEE

== See also ==
- Communes of the Maine-et-Loire department
- Owen Franklin Aldis, an American lawyer, died in Louvaines (Segré-en-Anjou Bleu)
