= Flée, Côte-d'Or =

Flée
- Part of Le Val-Larrey
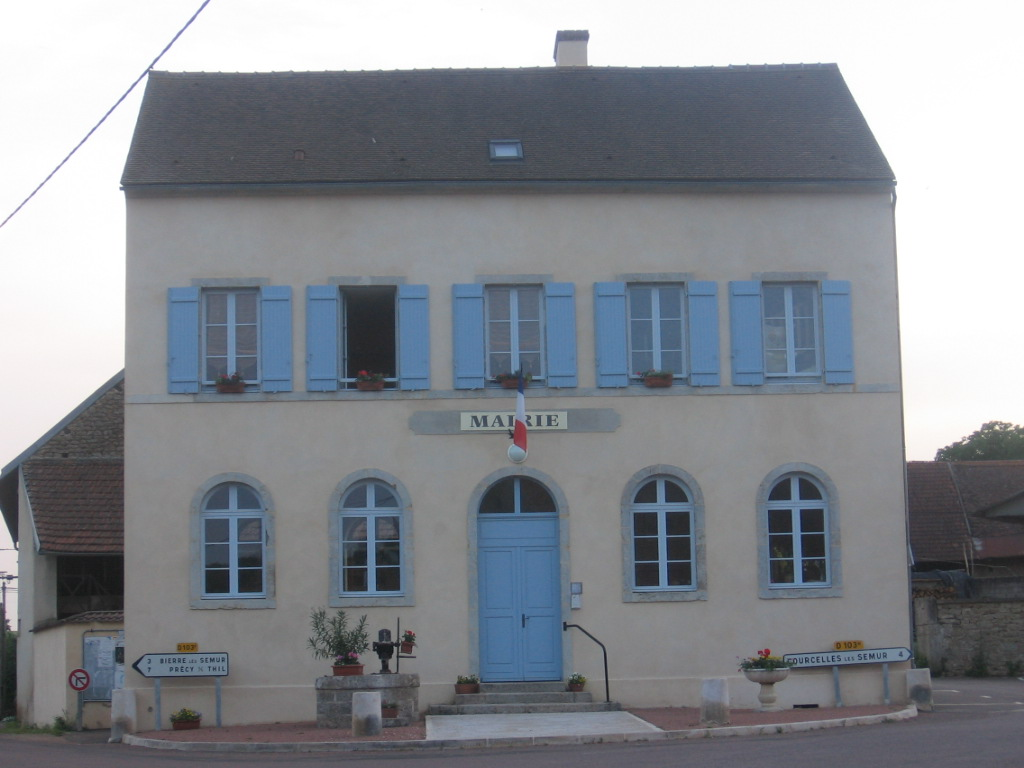
- Town hall
- Location of Flée
- Location within France Location within Bourgogne-Franche-Comté
- Coordinates: 47°26′10″N 4°19′47″E
- Country: France
- Region: Bourgogne-Franche-Comté
- Department: Côte-d'Or
- Arrondissement: Montbard
- Canton: Semur-en-Auxois
- Commune: Le Val-Larrey
- Area^{1}: 11.74 km^{2} (4.53 sq mi)
- Elevation: 340 m (1,120 ft)
- Highest elevation: 386 m (1,266 ft)
- Lowest elevation: 285 m (935 ft)
- Population (2023): 169
  - Density: 14.4/km^{2} (37.3/sq mi)
- Time zone: UTC+01:00 (CET)
  - Summer (DST): UTC+02:00 (CEST)
- Postal code: 21140
- ^{1} French Land Register data, which excludes lakes, ponds, glaciers > 1 km^{2} (0.386 sq mi or 247 acres) and river estuaries.

Flée (French pronunciation: [fle]) is a former commune in the Côte-d'Or department in eastern France. On 1 January 2019, it was merged into the commune Le Val-Larrey.

== See also ==
- Communes of the Côte-d'Or department
