= Massingy-lès-Vitteaux =

- Commune
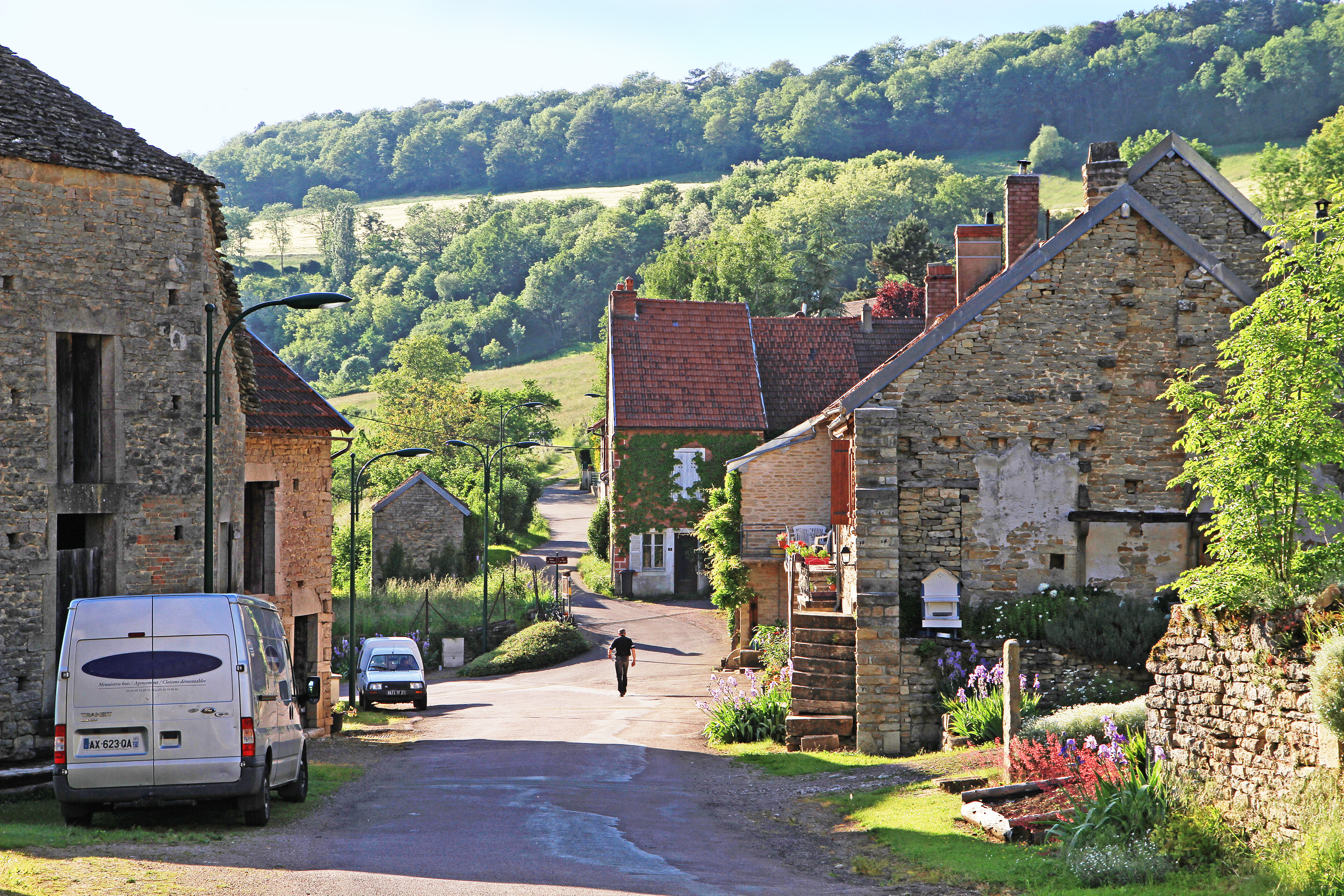
- The main road of Massingy-lès-Vitteaux
- Location of Massingy-lès-Vitteaux
- Location within France Location within Bourgogne-Franche-Comté
- Coordinates: 47°23′59″N 4°34′58″E
- Country: France
- Region: Bourgogne-Franche-Comté
- Department: Côte-d'Or
- Arrondissement: Montbard
- Canton: Semur-en-Auxois

Government
  - Mayor (2020–2026): Jean-Michel Petreau
- Area^{1}: 9.27 km^{2} (3.58 sq mi)
- Elevation: 420 m (1,380 ft)
- Highest elevation: 529 m (1,736 ft)
- Lowest elevation: 364 m (1,194 ft)
- Population (2023): 92
  - Density: 9.9/km^{2} (26/sq mi)
- Time zone: UTC+01:00 (CET)
  - Summer (DST): UTC+02:00 (CEST)
- INSEE/Postal code: 21395 /21350
- ^{1} French Land Register data, which excludes lakes, ponds, glaciers > 1 km^{2} (0.386 sq mi or 247 acres) and river estuaries.

Massingy-lès-Vitteaux (French pronunciation: [masɛ̃ʒi lɛ vito], literally Massingy near Vitteaux) is a commune in the Côte-d'Or department in eastern France.

== Population ==
Historical population
Year	Pop.	±% p.a.
1968	131	—
1975	99	−3.92%
1982	113	+1.91%
1990	112	−0.11%
1999	101	−1.14%
2007	85	−2.13%
2012	89	+0.92%
2017	96	+1.53%
2023	92	−0.71%
Source: INSEE

== See also ==
- Communes of the Côte-d'Or department
