= Massingy, Côte-d'Or =

Massingy
- Commune
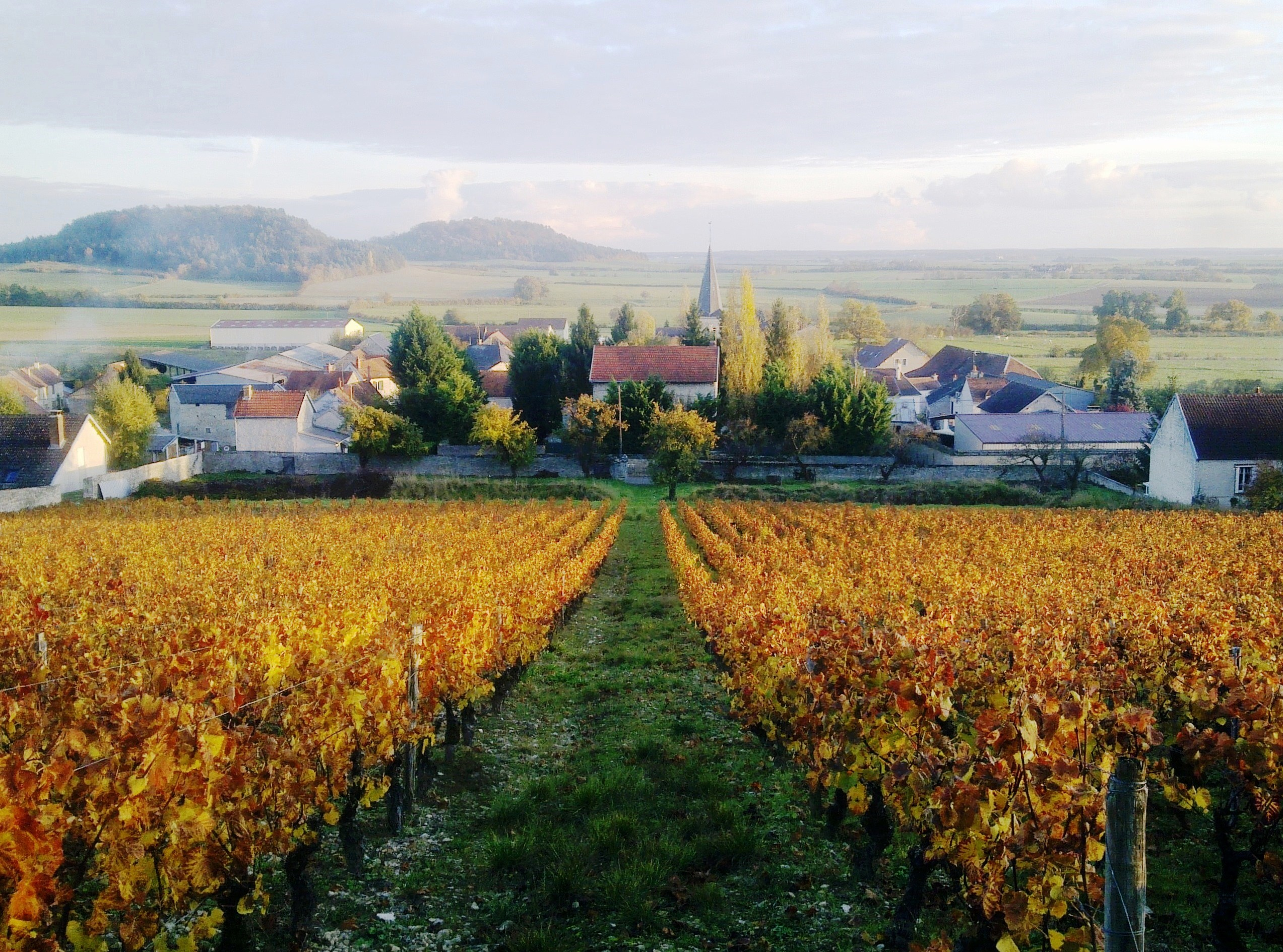
- A general view of Massingy

- Coat of arms
- Location of Massingy
- Location within France Location within Bourgogne-Franche-Comté
- Coordinates: 47°54′30″N 4°35′54″E
- Country: France
- Region: Bourgogne-Franche-Comté
- Department: Côte-d'Or
- Arrondissement: Montbard
- Canton: Châtillon-sur-Seine
- Intercommunality: Pays Châtillonnais

Government
  - Mayor (2020–2026): Jérémie Brigand
- Area^{1}: 9.49 km^{2} (3.66 sq mi)
- Elevation: 243 m (797 ft)
- Highest elevation: 333 m (1,093 ft)
- Lowest elevation: 209 m (686 ft)
- Population (2023): 171
  - Density: 18.0/km^{2} (46.7/sq mi)
- Time zone: UTC+01:00 (CET)
  - Summer (DST): UTC+02:00 (CEST)
- INSEE/Postal code: 21393 /21400
- ^{1} French Land Register data, which excludes lakes, ponds, glaciers > 1 km^{2} (0.386 sq mi or 247 acres) and river estuaries.

Massingy (French pronunciation: [masɛ̃ʒi]) is a commune in the Côte-d'Or department in eastern France.

== Population ==
Historical population
| Year | Pop. | ±% p.a. |
|---|---|---|
| 1968 | 125 | — |
| 1975 | 145 | +2.14% |
| 1982 | 116 | −3.14% |
| 1990 | 130 | +1.43% |
| 1999 | 150 | +1.60% |
| 2007 | 161 | +0.89% |
| 2012 | 155 | −0.76% |
| 2017 | 152 | −0.39% |
| 2023 | 171 | +1.98% |
Source: INSEE

== See also ==
- Communes of the Côte-d'Or department
