= Semur-en-Vallon =

- Commune
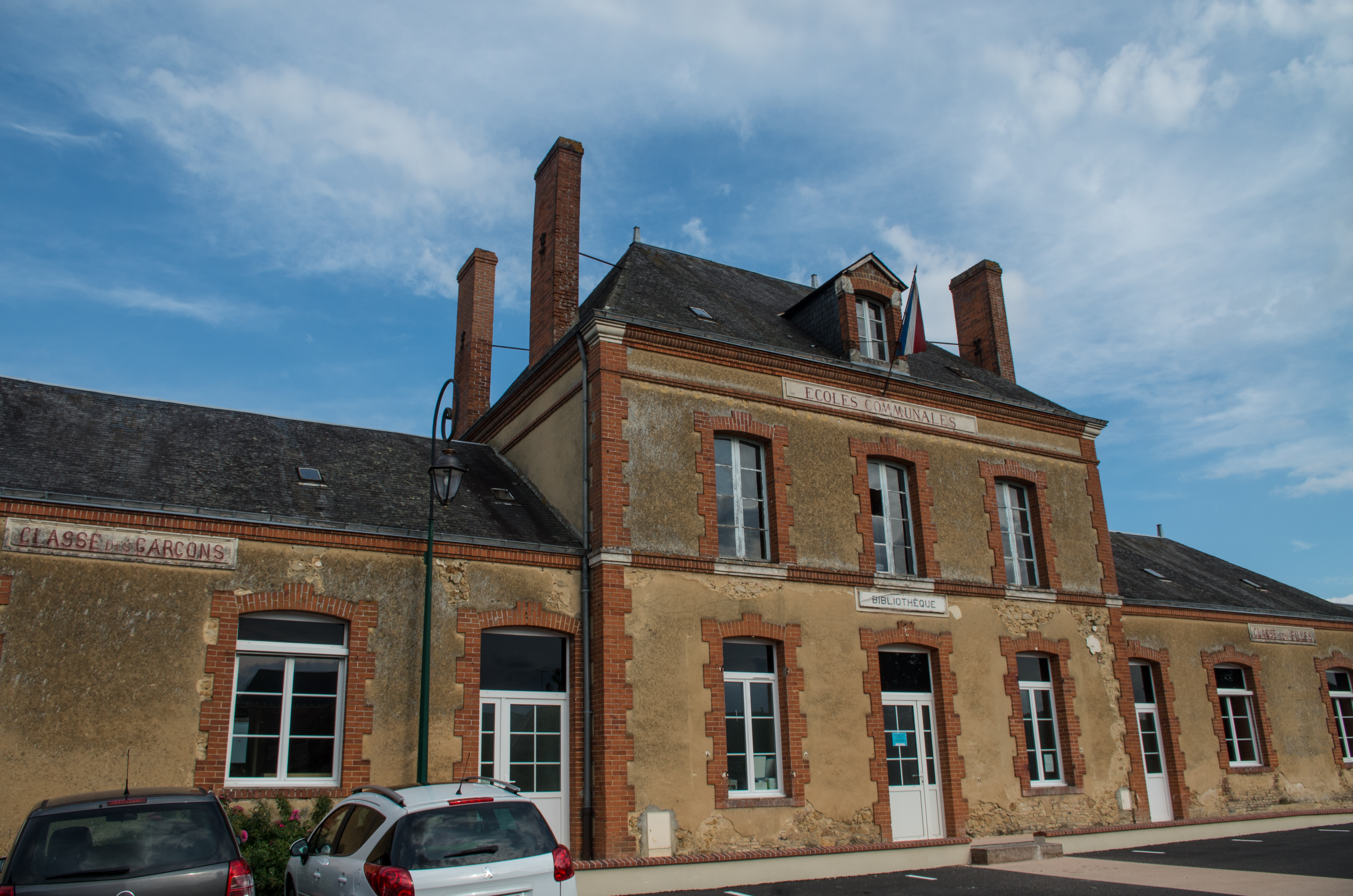
- The school of Semur-en-Vallon
- Location of Semur-en-Vallon
- Location within France Location within Pays de la Loire
- Coordinates: 48°01′26″N 0°39′16″E
- Country: France
- Region: Pays de la Loire
- Department: Sarthe
- Arrondissement: Mamers
- Canton: Saint-Calais
- Intercommunality: Vallées de la Braye et de l'Anille

Government
  - Mayor (2020–2026): Yvan Bosnyak
- Area^{1}: 15.13 km^{2} (5.84 sq mi)
- Highest elevation: 184 m (604 ft)
- Lowest elevation: 104 m (341 ft)
- Population (2023): 428
  - Density: 28.3/km^{2} (73.3/sq mi)
- Demonym(s): Semurois, Semuroise
- Time zone: UTC+01:00 (CET)
  - Summer (DST): UTC+02:00 (CEST)
- INSEE/Postal code: 72333 /72390
- ^{1} French Land Register data, which excludes lakes, ponds, glaciers > 1 km^{2} (0.386 sq mi or 247 acres) and river estuaries.

Semur-en-Vallon (French pronunciation: [səmyʁ ɑ̃ valɔ̃]) is a commune in the Sarthe department in the region of Pays de la Loire in north-western France.

== In film ==
The building was featured in the 1959 film The Scapegoat, with it being used for Jaques De Gué's country house/chateau.

== See also ==
- Communes of the Sarthe department
