= Massingy-lès-Semur =

- Commune
- Location of Massingy-lès-Semur
- Location within France Location within Bourgogne-Franche-Comté
- Coordinates: 47°30′42″N 4°24′07″E
- Country: France
- Region: Bourgogne-Franche-Comté
- Department: Côte-d'Or
- Arrondissement: Montbard
- Canton: Semur-en-Auxois

Government
  - Mayor (2020–2026): Sophie Lépée
- Area^{1}: 8.43 km^{2} (3.25 sq mi)
- Elevation: 320 m (1,050 ft)
- Highest elevation: 432 m (1,417 ft)
- Lowest elevation: 265 m (869 ft)
- Population (2023): 151
  - Density: 17.9/km^{2} (46.4/sq mi)
- Time zone: UTC+01:00 (CET)
  - Summer (DST): UTC+02:00 (CEST)
- INSEE/Postal code: 21394 /21140
- ^{1} French Land Register data, which excludes lakes, ponds, glaciers > 1 km^{2} (0.386 sq mi or 247 acres) and river estuaries.

Massingy-lès-Semur (French pronunciation: [masɛ̃ʒi lɛ səmyʁ], literally Massingy near Semur) is a commune in the Côte-d'Or department in eastern France.

== Population ==
Historical population
Year	Pop.	±% p.a.
1968	92	—
1975	88	−0.63%
1982	90	+0.32%
1990	120	+3.66%
1999	168	+3.81%
2007	201	+2.27%
2012	184	−1.75%
2017	163	−2.39%
2023	151	−1.27%
Source: INSEE

== See also ==
- Communes of the Côte-d'Or department
