= Maine-et-Loire =

Department in Pays de la Loire, France

- Department of France
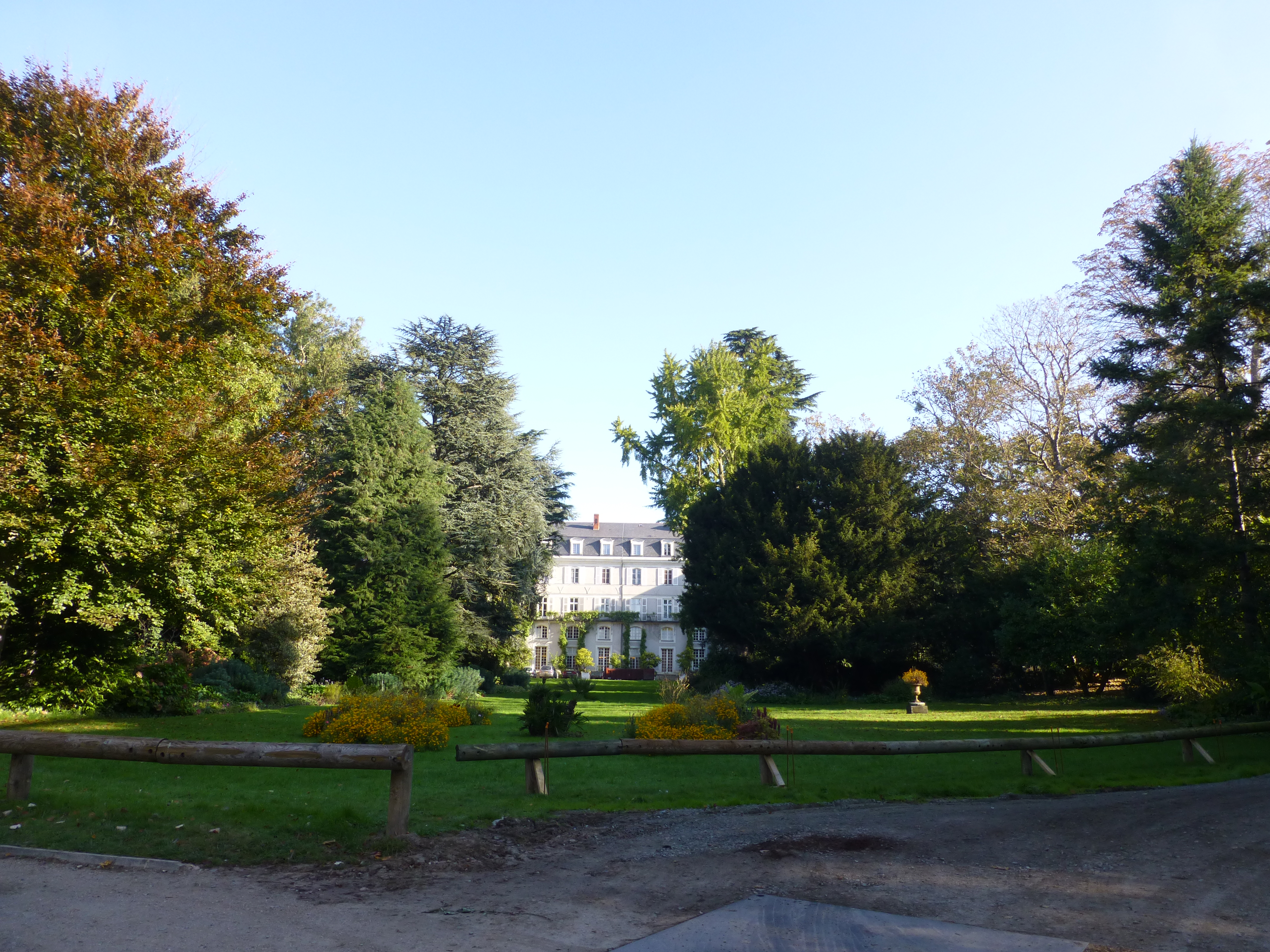
- Prefecture gardens in Angers

- Coat of arms

- Location of Maine-et-Loire in France
- Coordinates: 47°27′N 0°36′W
- Country: France
- Region: Pays de la Loire
- Prefecture: Angers
- Subprefectures: Cholet; Saumur; Segré-en-Anjou Bleu

Government
  - President of the Departmental Council: Florence Dabin (DVD)

Area^{1}
  - Total: 7,107 km^{2} (2,744 sq mi)

Population (2023)
  - Total: 833,776
  - Rank: 28th
  - Density: 117.3/km^{2} (303.9/sq mi)
- Time zone: UTC+1 (CET)
  - Summer (DST): UTC+2 (CEST)
- Department number: 49
- Arrondissements: 4
- Cantons: 21
- Communes: 176
- ^1 French Land Register data, which exclude estuaries and lakes, ponds and glaciers larger than 1 km^{2}

Maine-et-Loire (French pronunciation: [mɛn e lwaʁ]; lit. 'Maine and Loire') is a department in the Loire Valley in the Pays de la Loire region in Western France. It is named after the two rivers, Maine and the Loire. It borders Mayenne and Sarthe to the north, Loire-Atlantique to the west, Indre-et-Loire to the east, Vienne and Deux-Sèvres to the south, Vendée to the south-west, and Ille-et-Vilaine to the north-west. Its prefecture is Angers; its subprefectures are Cholet, Saumur and Segré-en-Anjou Bleu. Maine-et-Loire had a population of 833,776 in 2023.

== History ==
Maine-et-Loire is one of the original 83 departments created during the French Revolution on 4 March 1790, mostly out of the southern portion of the former province of Anjou. Originally it was called Mayenne-et-Loire, but its name was changed to Maine-et-Loire in 1791. Its present name is drawn from the rivers Maine and Loire, which meet within the department. The name Anjou is still occasionally used to refer to the department, including usage on official promotional channels.

== Geography ==
Maine-et-Loire is part of the current region of Pays de la Loire. The principal city is Angers, the seat of a bishopric and of a court of appeal.

It has a varied landscape, with forested ranges of hills in the south and north separated by the valley of the Loire. The highest point is Colline des Gardes at 210 m (690 ft). Part of the Loire Valley UNESCO World Heritage Site lies in Maine-et-Loire.

The area has many navigable rivers such as the Loire, Sarthe, Mayenne, Loir, and Authion.

=== Principal towns ===
The most populous commune is Angers, the prefecture. As of 2023, there are 6 communes with more than 20,000 inhabitants:

Commune	Population (2023)
Angers	159,022
Cholet	54,404
Saumur	26,241
Sèvremoine	25,797
Beaupréau-en-Mauges	23,989
Chemillé-en-Anjou	21,999

== Demographics ==
The inhabitants of Maine-et-Loire have no official qualifier. They are sometimes known as Angevins, from the former province of Anjou, or Mainéligériens, from the name of the department.

Population development since 1801:

Historical population

Year	Pop.	±% p.a.
1801	375,544	—
1806	404,134	+1.48%
1821	442,859	+0.61%
1831	467,871	+0.55%
1841	488,472	+0.43%
1851	515,452	+0.54%
1861	526,012	+0.20%
1872	518,471	−0.13%
1881	523,491	+0.11%
1891	518,589	−0.09%
1901	514,658	−0.08%
1911	508,149	−0.13%
1921	474,786	−0.68%
1931	475,991	+0.03%

Year	Pop.	±% p.a.
1936	477,690	+0.07%
1946	496,068	+0.38%
1954	518,241	+0.55%
1962	556,272	+0.89%
1968	584,933	+0.84%
1975	629,466	+1.05%
1982	674,997	+1.00%
1990	705,599	+0.56%
1999	732,657	+0.42%
2007	770,608	+0.63%
2012	795,405	+0.64%
2017	813,493	+0.45%
2023	833,776	+0.41%

== Politics ==
The president of the Departmental Council is Florence Dabin, elected in July 2021.

=== Current National Assembly Representatives ===
Constituency	Member	Party
Maine-et-Loire's 1st constituency	François Gernigon	Horizons
Maine-et-Loire's 2nd constituency	Stella Dupont	Renaissance
Maine-et-Loire's 3rd constituency	Anne-Laure Blin	The Republicans
Maine-et-Loire's 4th constituency	Laëtitia Saint-Paul	Renaissance
Maine-et-Loire's 5th constituency	Denis Masséglia	Renaissance
Maine-et-Loire's 6th constituency	Nicole Dubré-Chirat	Renaissance
Maine-et-Loire's 7th constituency	Philippe Bolo	MoDem

== Tourism ==
Châteaux of the Loire Valley

- Château de Montsoreau.
- Royal Abbey of Fontevraud.
- Château de Brissac.
- Château de Saumur.
- Château d'Angers.
- Château de Brézé.

Anjou traditions

- The largest vineyard of the Loire Valley.
- The boule de fort, the traditional boules game in Anjou

Angers and around:

- The Angers castle and the Apocalypse Tapestry, the largest tapestry in the world.
- The Cointreau museum, in Saint-Barthélemy-d'Anjou
- The Château de Brissac, the tallest castle of the Loire Valley.
- The crooked spires in Baugé region.

Saumur and around:

- The Cadre Noir, one of the most famous horsemanship school in the world.
- Montsoreau Flea Market is the largest Flea Market in the Loire Valley taking place every second Sunday of the month.
- Château de Montsoreau-Museum of contemporary art, featuring the Philippe Méaille Collection, largest collection of works by the British conceptual artists, Art & Language.
- The Royal Abbey of Fontevraud and the graves of the House of Plantagenet, including Richard I of England.
- The Tank museum of Saumur, which display the largest tank collection in France.
- Around Saumur, the largest concentration of troglodyte house in Europe.

Cholet and around:

- The textile museum of Cholet, and the creation of the famous red and white handkerchief.
- The Château de Touvois
- The Parc Oriental de Maulévrier, the largest Japanese garden of France

Segré and around:

- The fortified city of Pouancé and its medieval castle.
- The Blue Mine, a slate mine, with a funicular which goes 130 meters under the surface.
- The National stud of Le Lion-d'Angers, which host every year Le Mondial du Lion
- The Château de Challain-la-Potherie
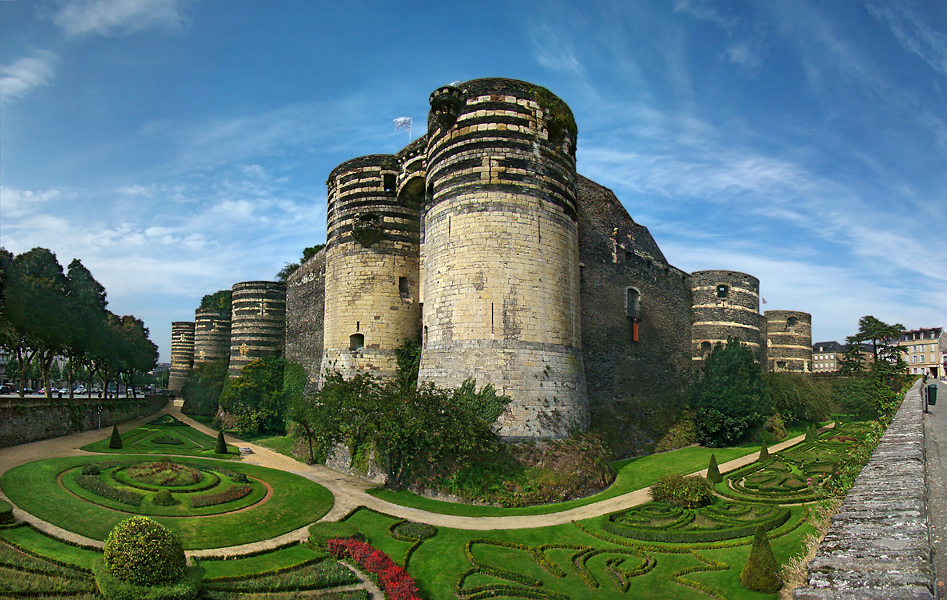
Château d'Angers

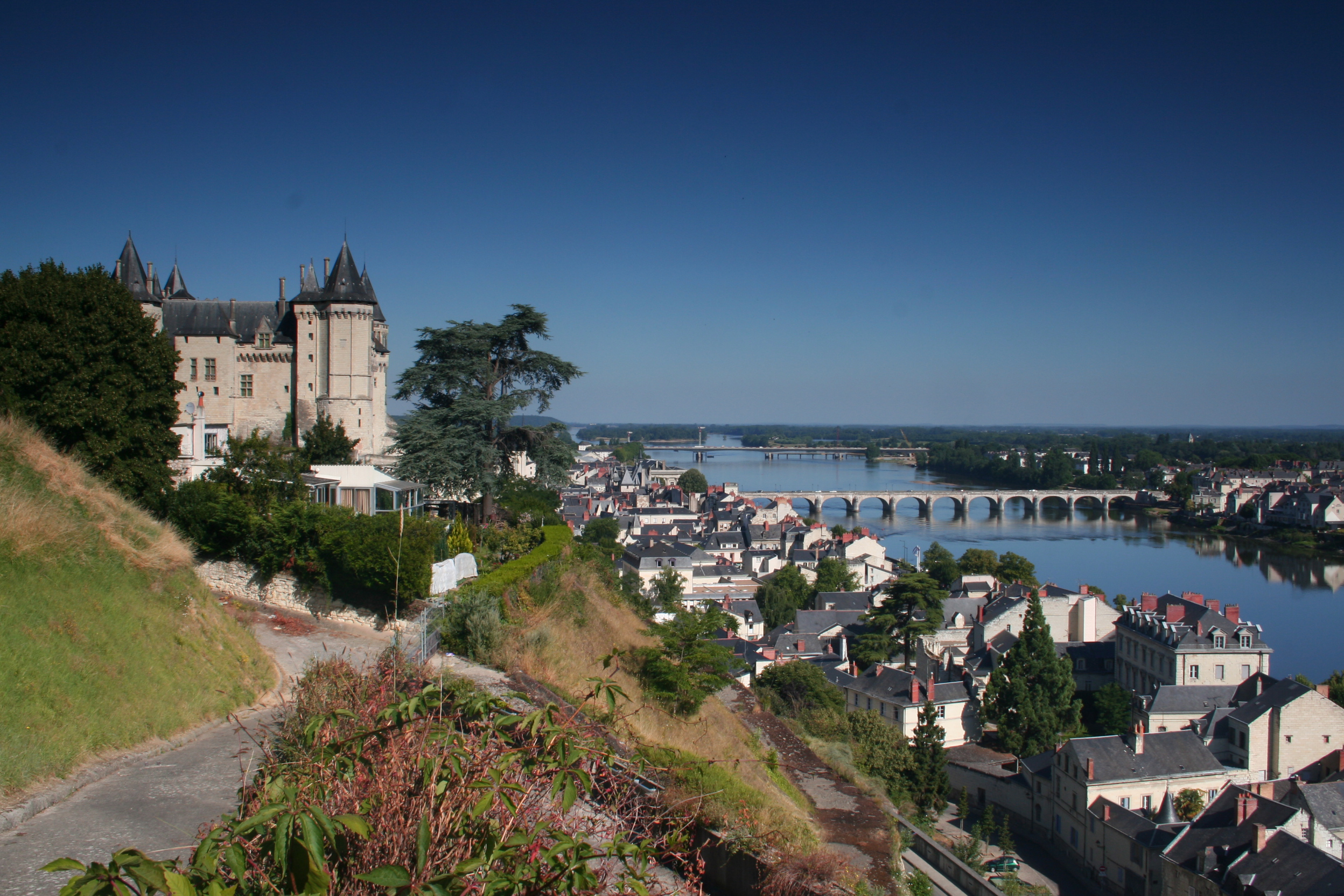
Saumur

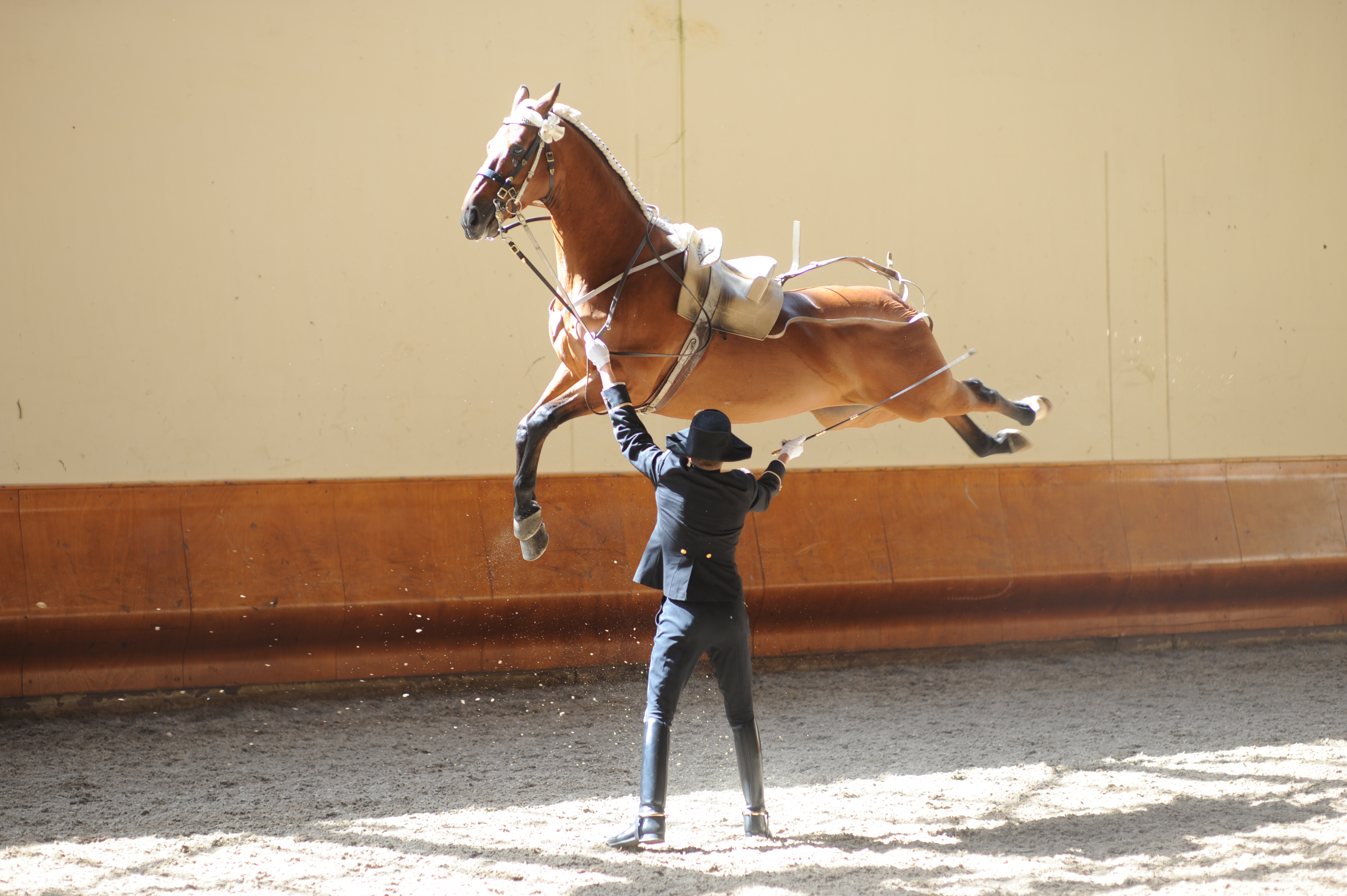
Cadre Noir

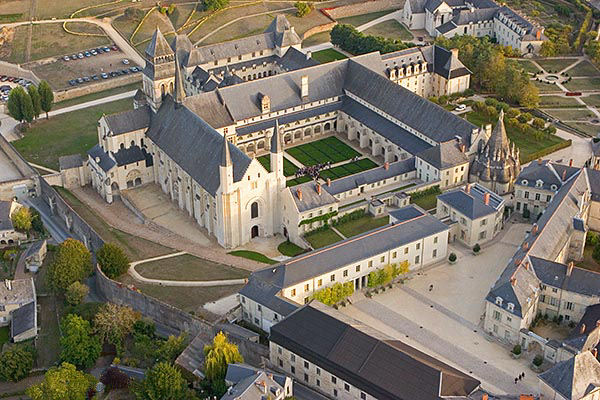
Fontevraud Abbey

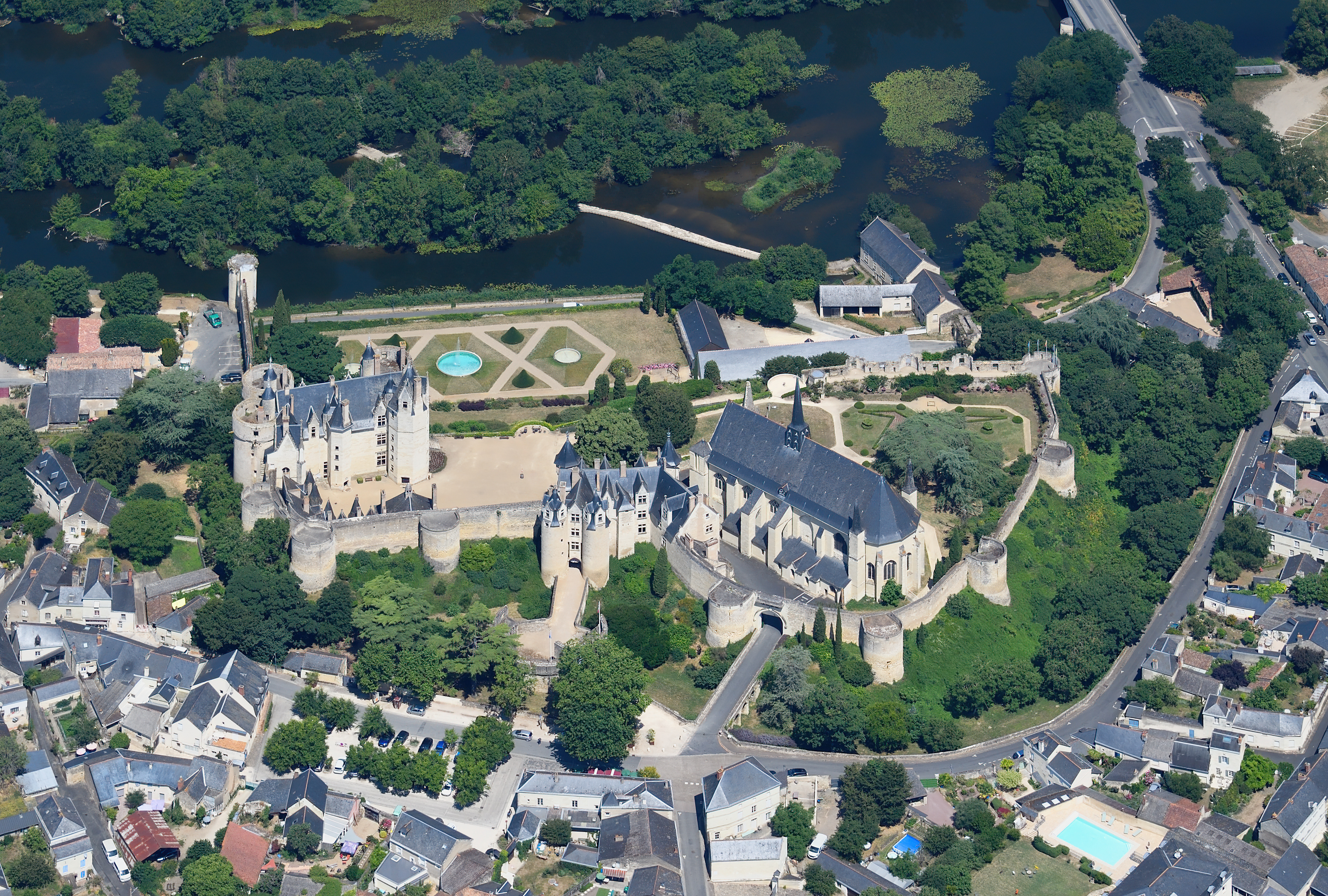
Montreuil-Bellay

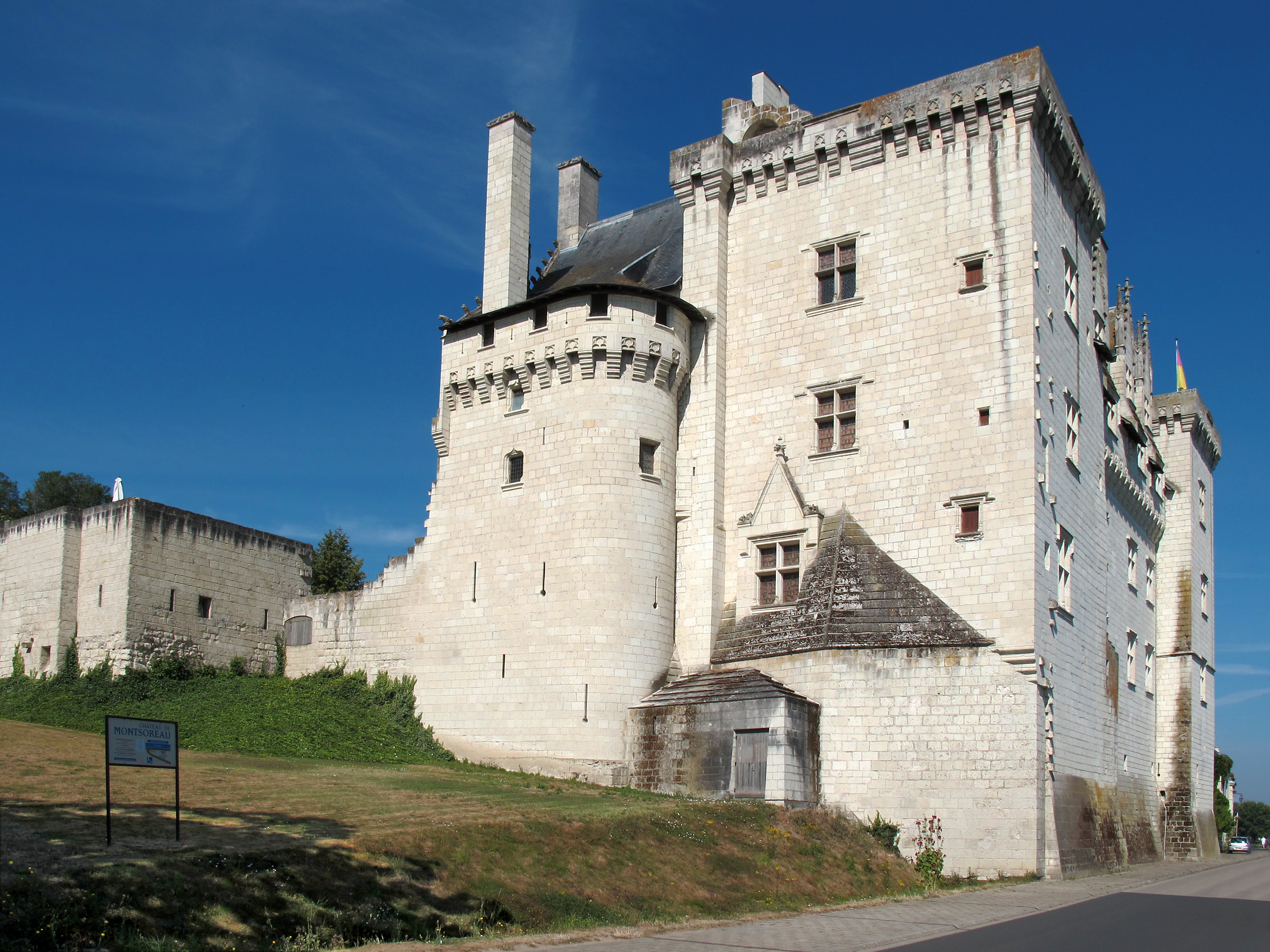
Château de Montsoreau-Museum of Contemporary Art

== See also ==
- Cantons of the Maine-et-Loire department
- Communes of the Maine-et-Loire department
- Arrondissements of the Maine-et-Loire department
- Anjou wine
- Château de Challain-la-Potherie
- Owen Franklin Aldis, an American lawyer, died in Louvaines (Segré-en-Anjou Bleu)
