= La Pouëze =

- Part of Erdre-en-Anjou
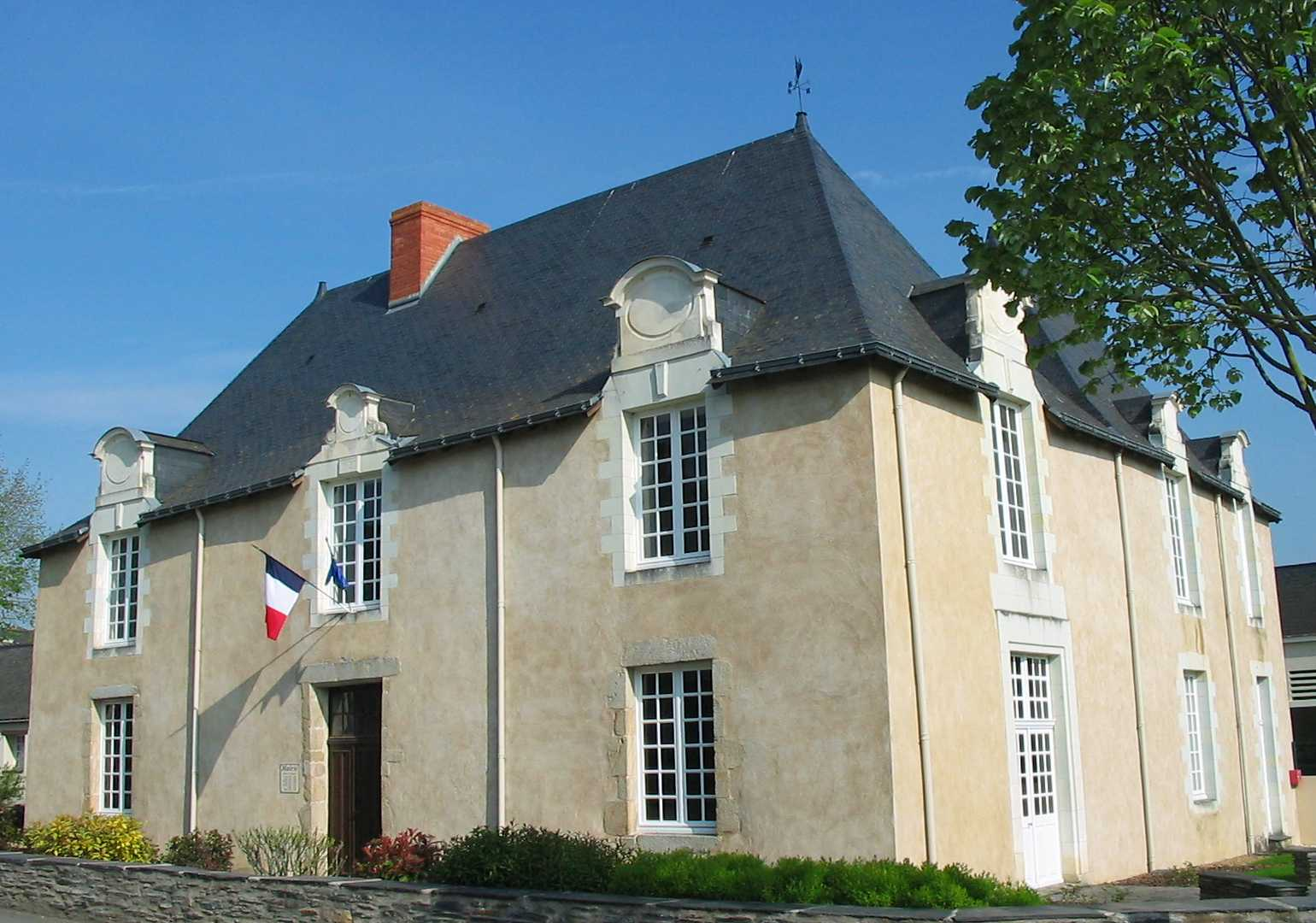
- Location of La Pouëze
- Location within France Location within Pays de la Loire
- Coordinates: 47°33′13″N 0°48′30″W
- Country: France
- Region: Pays de la Loire
- Department: Maine-et-Loire
- Arrondissement: Segré
- Canton: Chalonnes-sur-Loire
- Commune: Erdre-en-Anjou
- Area^{1}: 22.15 km^{2} (8.55 sq mi)
- Elevation: 70 m (230 ft)
- Highest elevation: 97 m (318 ft)
- Lowest elevation: 51 m (167 ft)
- Population (2022): 2,009
  - Density: 90.70/km^{2} (234.9/sq mi)
- Demonym(s): Pouëzéen, Pouëzéenne
- Time zone: UTC+01:00 (CET)
  - Summer (DST): UTC+02:00 (CEST)
- Postal code: 49370
- ^{1} French Land Register data, which excludes lakes, ponds, glaciers > 1 km^{2} (0.386 sq mi or 247 acres) and river estuaries.

La Pouëze (French pronunciation: [la pwɛz]) is a former commune in the Maine-et-Loire department in western France. On 28 December 2015, it was merged into the new commune Erdre-en-Anjou.

== See also ==
- Communes of the Maine-et-Loire department
