= La Cornuaille =

- Part of Val d'Erdre-Auxence
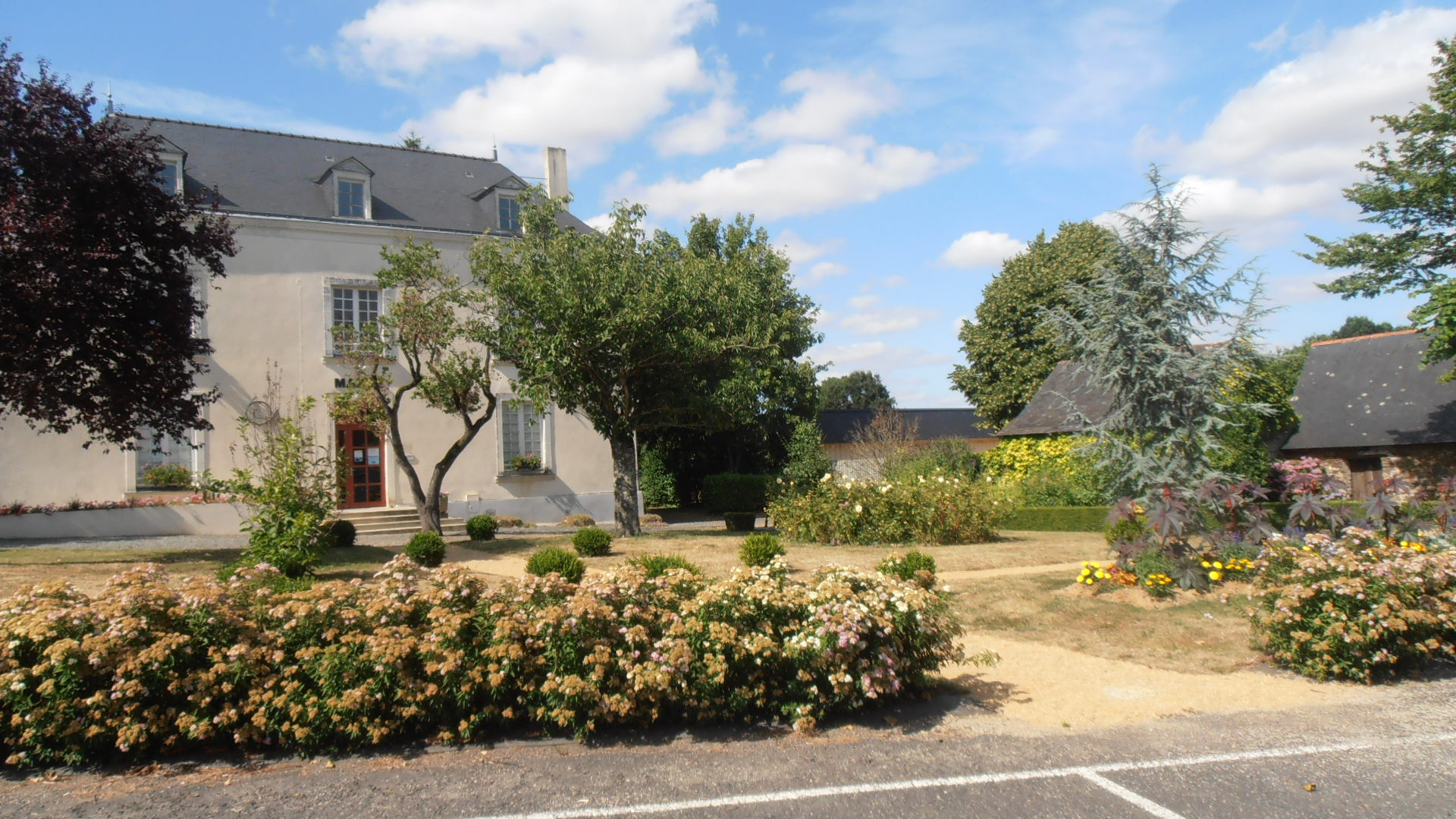
- Town hall
- Location of La Cornuaille
- Location within France Location within Pays de la Loire
- Coordinates: 47°30′42″N 0°59′01″W
- Country: France
- Region: Pays de la Loire
- Department: Maine-et-Loire
- Arrondissement: Segré
- Canton: Chalonnes-sur-Loire
- Commune: Val d'Erdre-Auxence
- Area^{1}: 43.92 km^{2} (16.96 sq mi)
- Elevation: 54 m (177 ft)
- Highest elevation: 89 m (292 ft)
- Lowest elevation: 38 m (125 ft)
- Population (2022): 967
  - Density: 22.0/km^{2} (57.0/sq mi)
- Demonym(s): Cornuaillais, Cornuaillaise
- Time zone: UTC+01:00 (CET)
  - Summer (DST): UTC+02:00 (CEST)
- Postal code: 49440
- ^{1} French Land Register data, which excludes lakes, ponds, glaciers > 1 km^{2} (0.386 sq mi or 247 acres) and river estuaries.

La Cornuaille (French pronunciation: [la kɔʁnɥaj]) is a former commune in the Maine-et-Loire department in western France. On 15 December 2016, it was merged into the new commune Val d'Erdre-Auxence.

== Population ==
Historical population
Year	Pop.	±% p.a.
1962	1,019	—
1968	983	−0.60%
1975	841	−2.20%
1982	785	−0.98%
1990	719	−1.09%
1999	791	+1.07%
2006	877	+1.49%
Source: EHESS

== See also ==
- Communes of the Maine-et-Loire department
