= Le Louroux-Béconnais =

- Part of Val d'Erdre-Auxence
- Location of Le Louroux-Béconnais
- Location within France Location within Pays de la Loire
- Coordinates: 47°31′21″N 0°53′06″W
- Country: France
- Region: Pays de la Loire
- Department: Maine-et-Loire
- Arrondissement: Segré
- Canton: Chalonnes-sur-Loire
- Commune: Val d'Erdre-Auxence
- Area^{1}: 65.57 km^{2} (25.32 sq mi)
- Highest elevation: 91 m (299 ft)
- Lowest elevation: 27 m (89 ft)
- Population (2022): 3,309
  - Density: 50.47/km^{2} (130.7/sq mi)
- Demonym(s): Lorétain, Lorétaine
- Time zone: UTC+01:00 (CET)
  - Summer (DST): UTC+02:00 (CEST)
- Postal code: 49370
- ^{1} French Land Register data, which excludes lakes, ponds, glaciers > 1 km^{2} (0.386 sq mi or 247 acres) and river estuaries.

Le Louroux-Béconnais (French pronunciation: [lə luʁu bekɔnɛ]) is a former commune in the Maine-et-Loire department in western France. On 15 December 2016, it was merged into the new commune Val d'Erdre-Auxence.

== See also ==
- Communes of the Maine-et-Loire department
