= Villemoisan =

- Part of Val d'Erdre-Auxence
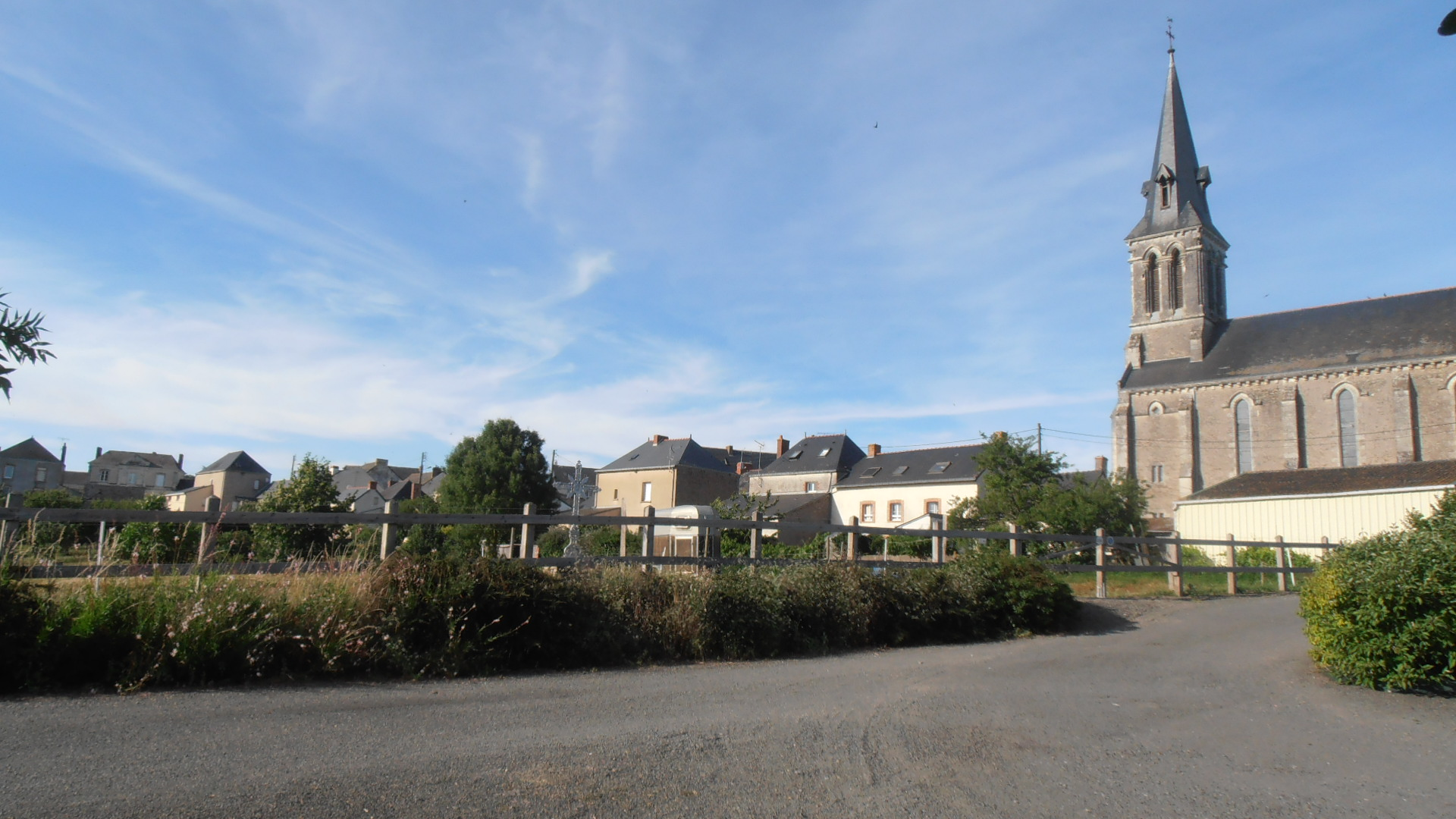
- Location of Villemoisan
- Location within France Location within Pays de la Loire
- Coordinates: 47°27′51″N 0°53′28″W
- Country: France
- Region: Pays de la Loire
- Department: Maine-et-Loire
- Arrondissement: Segré
- Canton: Chalonnes-sur-Loire
- Commune: Val d'Erdre-Auxence
- Area^{1}: 20.75 km^{2} (8.01 sq mi)
- Elevation: 60 m (200 ft)
- Highest elevation: 90 m (300 ft)
- Lowest elevation: 12 m (39 ft)
- Population (2022): 691
  - Density: 33.3/km^{2} (86.2/sq mi)
- Demonym(s): Villemoisanais, Villemoisanaise
- Time zone: UTC+01:00 (CET)
  - Summer (DST): UTC+02:00 (CEST)
- Postal code: 49370
- Website: Site officiel de Villemoisan
- ^{1} French Land Register data, which excludes lakes, ponds, glaciers > 1 km^{2} (0.386 sq mi or 247 acres) and river estuaries.

Villemoisan (French pronunciation: [vilmwazɑ̃]) is a former commune in the Maine-et-Loire department in western France. On 15 December 2016, it was merged into the new commune Val d'Erdre-Auxence.

== See also ==
- Communes of the Maine-et-Loire department
