= Ingrandes, Maine-et-Loire =

Ingrandes
- Part of Ingrandes-Le Fresne sur Loire
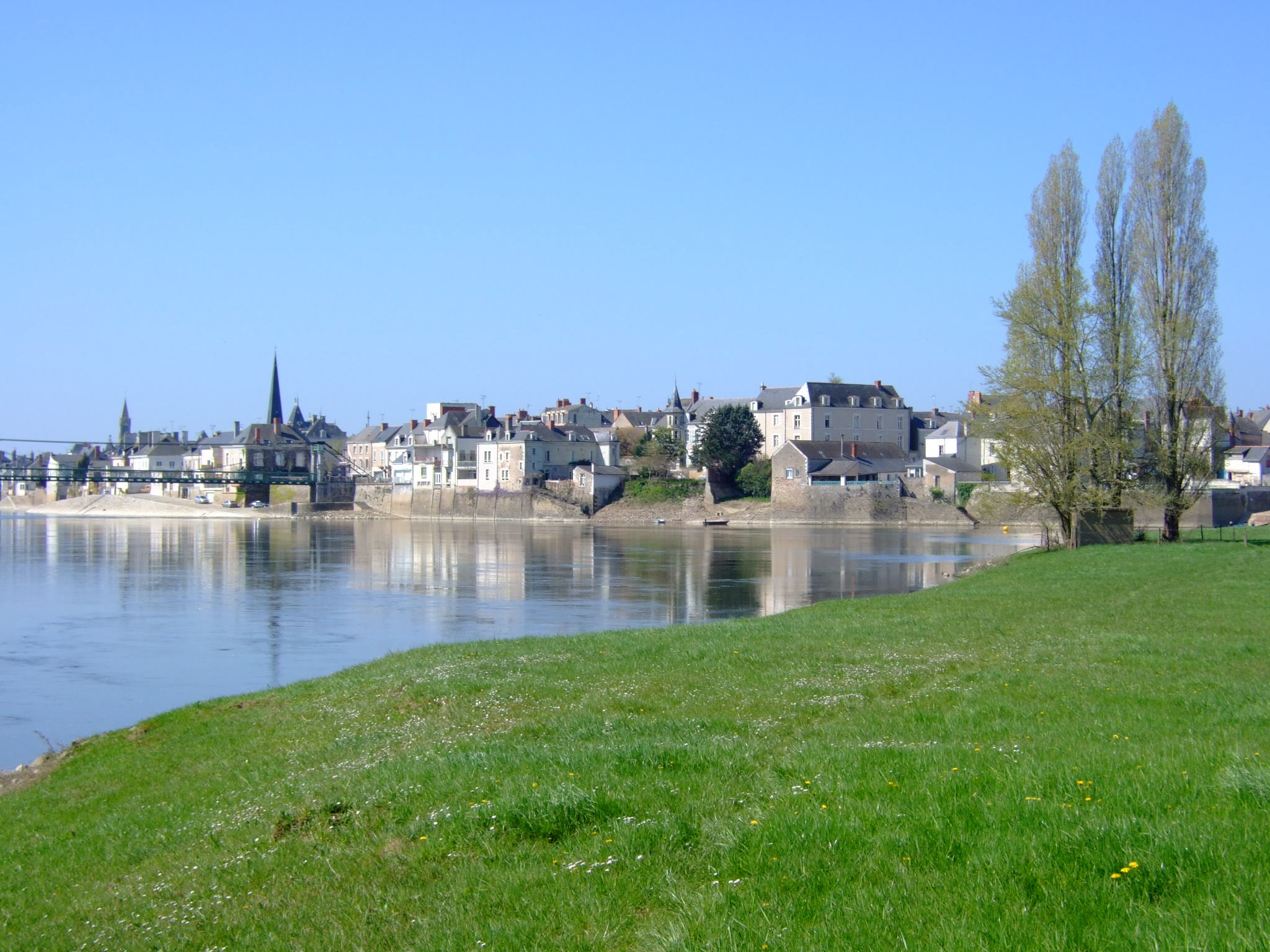

- Coat of arms
- Location of Ingrandes
- Location within France Location within Pays de la Loire
- Coordinates: 47°24′11″N 0°55′20″W
- Country: France
- Region: Pays de la Loire
- Department: Maine-et-Loire
- Arrondissement: Angers
- Canton: Chalonnes-sur-Loire
- Commune: Ingrandes-Le Fresne sur Loire
- Area^{1}: 6.65 km^{2} (2.57 sq mi)
- Highest elevation: 69 m (226 ft)
- Lowest elevation: 7 m (23 ft)
- Population (2013): 1,661
  - Density: 250/km^{2} (647/sq mi)
- Demonym(s): Ingrandais, Ingrandaise
- Time zone: UTC+01:00 (CET)
  - Summer (DST): UTC+02:00 (CEST)
- Postal code: 49123
- ^{1} French Land Register data, which excludes lakes, ponds, glaciers > 1 km^{2} (0.386 sq mi or 247 acres) and river estuaries.

Ingrandes (French pronunciation: [ɛ̃ɡʁɑ̃d]) is a former commune in the Maine-et-Loire department, Pays de la Loire, France. On 1 January 2016, it was merged into the new commune of Ingrandes-le-Fresne-sur-Loire.

== See also ==
- Communes of the Maine-et-Loire department
