= Saint-Sigismond, Maine-et-Loire =

Saint-Sigismond
- Part of Ingrandes-le-Fresne-sur-Loire
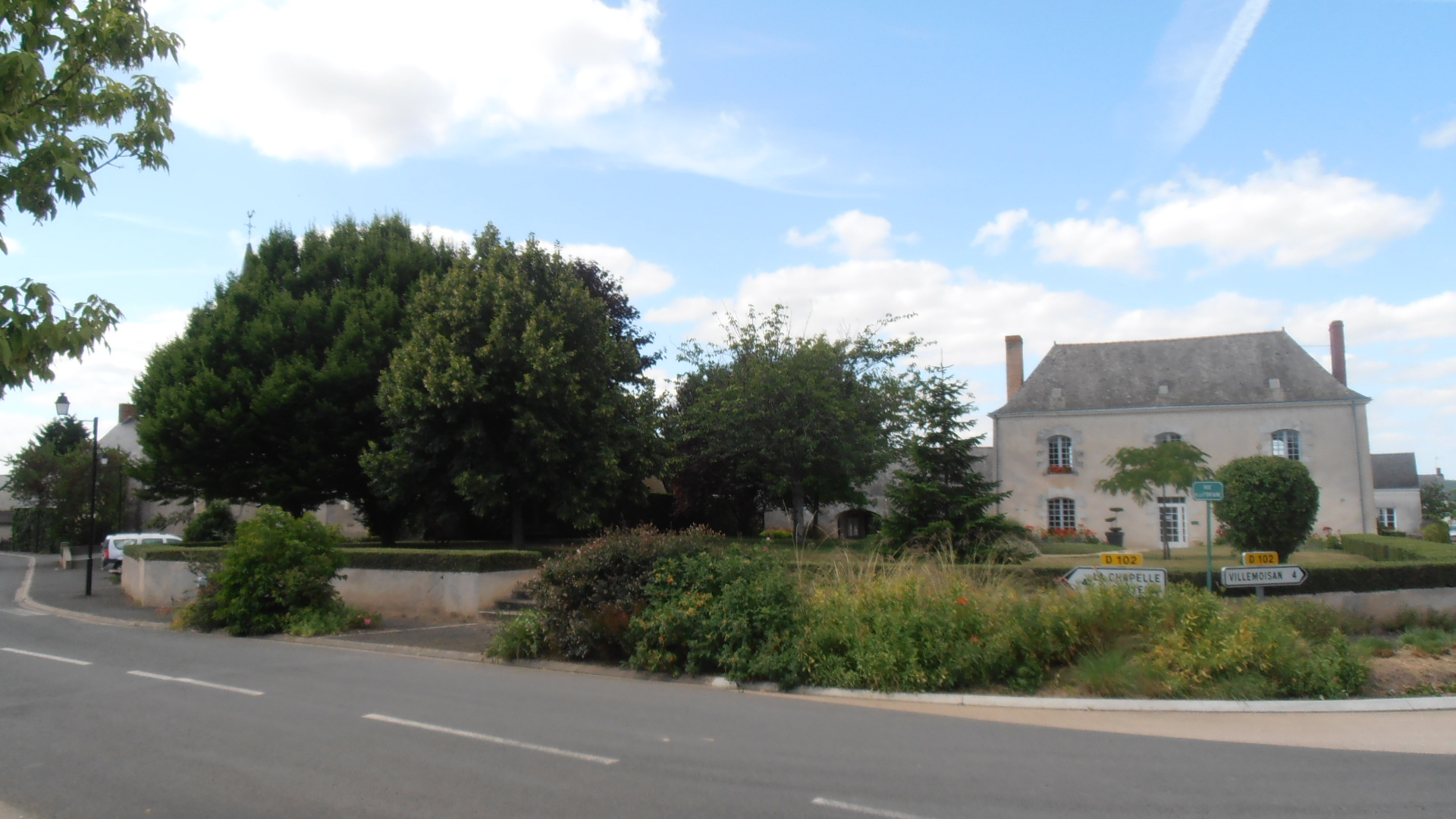
- The centre of the village
- Location of Saint-Sigismond
- Location within France Location within Pays de la Loire
- Coordinates: 47°27′16″N 0°56′29″W
- Country: France
- Region: Pays de la Loire
- Department: Maine-et-Loire
- Arrondissement: Segré
- Canton: Chalonnes-sur-Loire
- Commune: Ingrandes-le-Fresne-sur-Loire
- Area^{1}: 12.72 km^{2} (4.91 sq mi)
- Elevation: 68 m (223 ft)
- Highest elevation: 86 m (282 ft)
- Lowest elevation: 24 m (79 ft)
- Population (2021): 390
  - Density: 31/km^{2} (79/sq mi)
- Time zone: UTC+01:00 (CET)
  - Summer (DST): UTC+02:00 (CEST)
- Postal code: 49123
- ^{1} French Land Register data, which excludes lakes, ponds, glaciers > 1 km^{2} (0.386 sq mi or 247 acres) and river estuaries.

Saint-Sigismond (French pronunciation: [sɛ̃ siʒismɔ̃]) is a former commune in the Maine-et-Loire department in western France. On 1 January 2024, it was merged into the commune of Ingrandes-le-Fresne-sur-Loire.

== See also ==
- Communes of the Maine-et-Loire department
