= Saint-Sigismond =

Saint-Sigismond may refer to the following places in France:

- Saint-Sigismond, Loiret, a commune in the Loiret department
- Saint-Sigismond, Maine-et-Loire, a commune in the Maine-et-Loire department
- Saint-Sigismond, Haute-Savoie, a commune in the Haute-Savoie department
- Saint-Sigismond, Vendée, a commune in the Vendée department
