= Gené, Maine-et-Loire =

Gené
- Part of Erdre-en-Anjou
- Location of Gené
- Location within France Location within Pays de la Loire
- Coordinates: 47°37′54″N 0°48′08″W
- Country: France
- Region: Pays de la Loire
- Department: Maine-et-Loire
- Arrondissement: Segré
- Canton: Tiercé
- Commune: Erdre-en-Anjou
- Area^{1}: 9.25 km^{2} (3.57 sq mi)
- Elevation: 44 m (144 ft)
- Highest elevation: 54 m (177 ft)
- Lowest elevation: 36 m (118 ft)
- Population (2022): 497
  - Density: 53.7/km^{2} (139/sq mi)
- Demonym(s): Genéen, Genéenne
- Time zone: UTC+01:00 (CET)
  - Summer (DST): UTC+02:00 (CEST)
- Postal code: 49220
- ^{1} French Land Register data, which excludes lakes, ponds, glaciers > 1 km^{2} (0.386 sq mi or 247 acres) and river estuaries.

Gené (French pronunciation: [ʒəne]) is a former commune in the Maine-et-Loire department in western France. On 28 December 2015, it was merged into the new commune Erdre-en-Anjou. The demonym is Genéen for men and Genéenne for women.

== See also ==
- Communes of the Maine-et-Loire department
