= Vern-d'Anjou =

Vern-d’Anjou
- Part of Erdre-en-Anjou
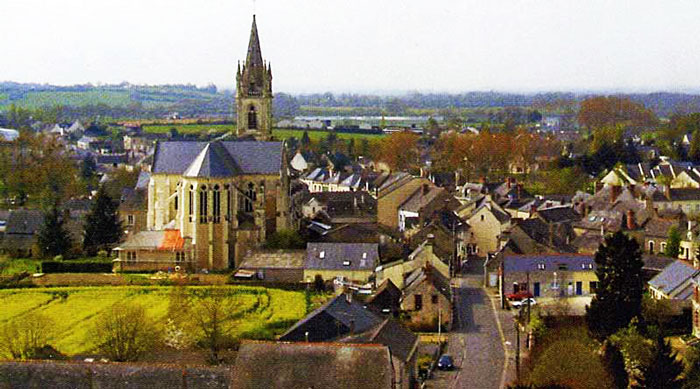
- Location of Vern-d’Anjou
- Location within France Location within Pays de la Loire
- Coordinates: 47°36′14″N 0°50′00″W
- Country: France
- Region: Pays de la Loire
- Department: Maine-et-Loire
- Arrondissement: Segré
- Canton: Tiercé
- Commune: Erdre-en-Anjou
- Area^{1}: 36.11 km^{2} (13.94 sq mi)
- Highest elevation: 87 m (285 ft)
- Lowest elevation: 33 m (108 ft)
- Population (2022): 2,329
  - Density: 64.50/km^{2} (167.0/sq mi)
- Demonym: Vernois
- Time zone: UTC+01:00 (CET)
  - Summer (DST): UTC+02:00 (CEST)
- Postal code: 49220
- Website: www.ville-verndanjou.fr
- ^{1} French Land Register data, which excludes lakes, ponds, glaciers > 1 km^{2} (0.386 sq mi or 247 acres) and river estuaries.

Vern-d'Anjou (French pronunciation: [vɛʁn dɑ̃ʒu], literally Vern of Anjou) is a former commune in the Maine-et-Loire department in western France. On 28 December 2015, it was merged into the new commune Erdre-en-Anjou.

== See also ==
- Communes of the Maine-et-Loire department
