= Brain-sur-Longuenée =

- Part of Erdre-en-Anjou
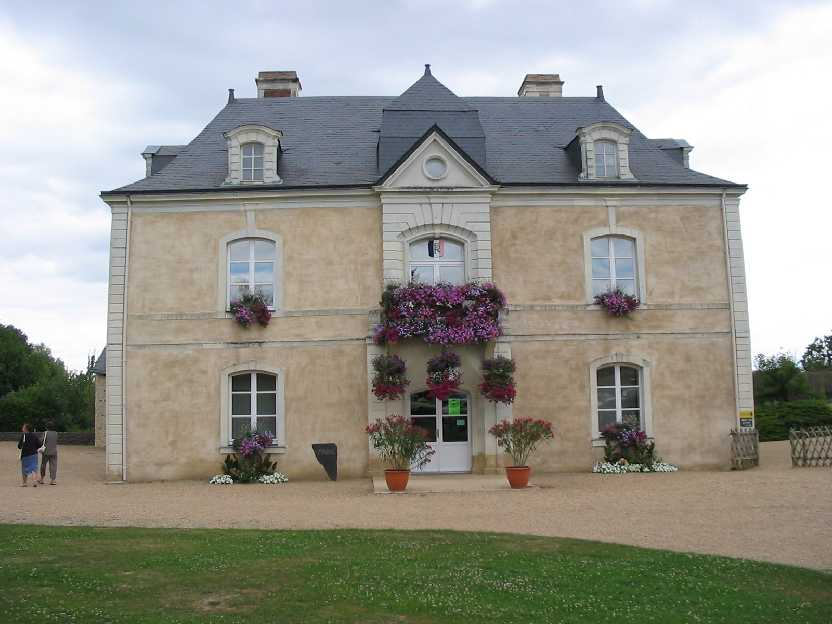
- Town hall

- Flag
- Location of Brain-sur-Longuenée
- Location within France Location within Pays de la Loire
- Coordinates: 47°35′08″N 0°45′39″W
- Country: France
- Region: Pays de la Loire
- Department: Maine-et-Loire
- Arrondissement: Segré
- Canton: Tiercé
- Commune: Erdre-en-Anjou
- Area^{1}: 22.43 km^{2} (8.66 sq mi)
- Elevation: 78 m (256 ft)
- Highest elevation: 102 m (335 ft)
- Lowest elevation: 41 m (135 ft)
- Population (2023): 955
  - Density: 42.6/km^{2} (110/sq mi)
- Time zone: UTC+01:00 (CET)
  - Summer (DST): UTC+02:00 (CEST)
- Postal code: 49220
- ^{1} French Land Register data, which excludes lakes, ponds, glaciers > 1 km^{2} (0.386 sq mi or 247 acres) and river estuaries.

Brain-sur-Longuenée (French pronunciation: [bʁɛ̃ syʁ lɔ̃ɡne]) is a former commune in the Maine-et-Loire department in western France. On 28 December 2015, it was merged into the new commune Erdre-en-Anjou.

== See also ==
- Communes of the Maine-et-Loire department
