= Le Fresne-sur-Loire =

Commune in Loire-Atlantique, France

- Part of Ingrandes-le-Fresne-sur-Loire
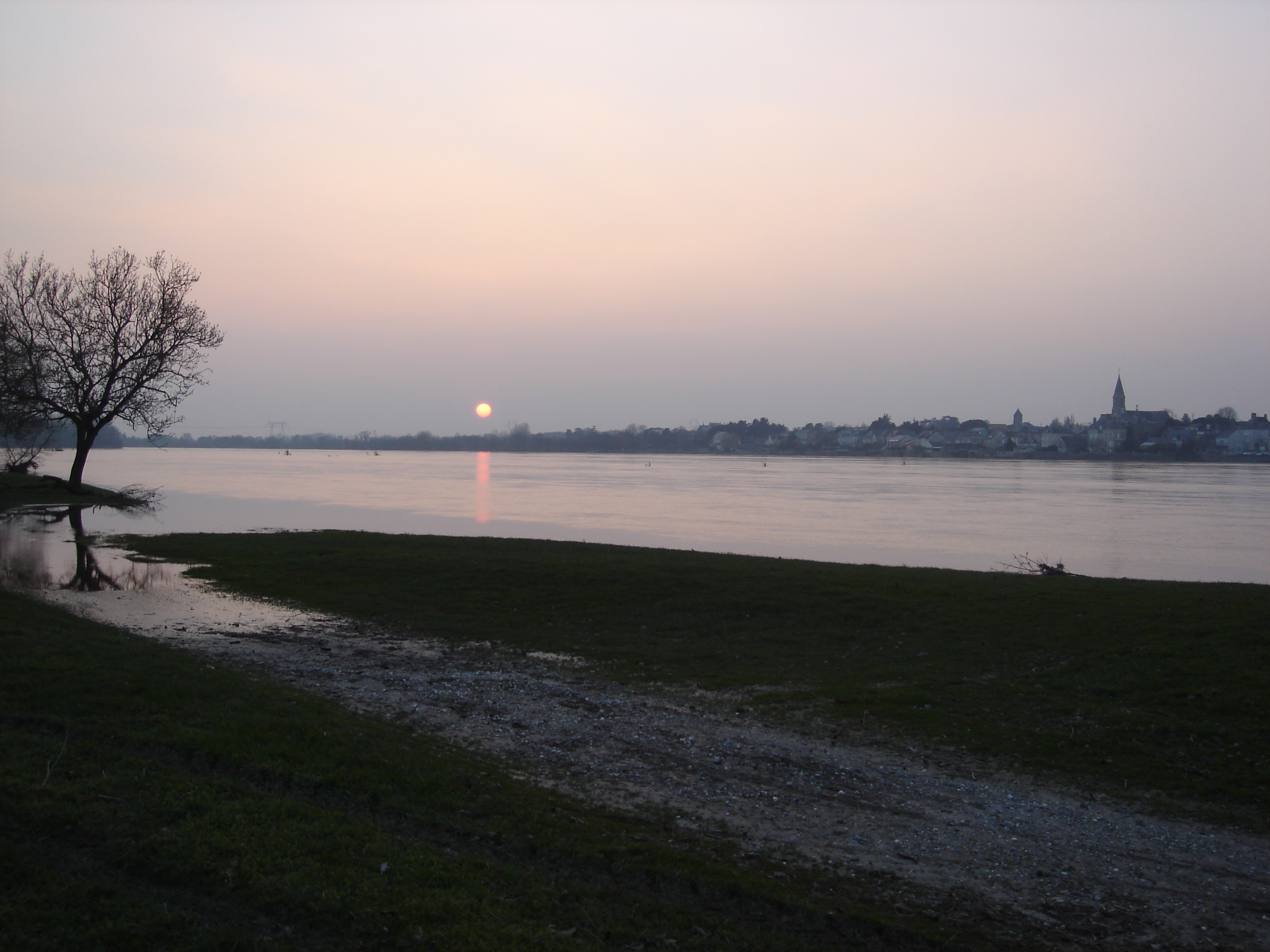
- Le Fresne-sur-Loire seen from the south bank of the Loire, during high water.

- Coat of arms
- Location of Le Fresne-sur-Loire
- Location within France Location within Pays de la Loire
- Coordinates: 47°24′06″N 0°55′37″W
- Country: France
- Region: Pays de la Loire
- Department: Maine-et-Loire
- Arrondissement: Angers
- Canton: Chalonnes-sur-Loire
- Commune: Ingrandes-le-Fresne-sur-Loire
- Area^{1}: 6.29 km^{2} (2.43 sq mi)
- Highest elevation: 61 m (200 ft)
- Lowest elevation: 7 m (23 ft)
- Population (2019): 987
  - Density: 157/km^{2} (406/sq mi)
- Demonym(s): Fresnoises, Fresnois
- Time zone: UTC+01:00 (CET)
  - Summer (DST): UTC+02:00 (CEST)
- Postal code: 49123
- Website: http://www.lefresnesurloire.fr/
- ^{1} French Land Register data, which excludes lakes, ponds, glaciers > 1 km^{2} (0.386 sq mi or 247 acres) and river estuaries.

Le Fresne-sur-Loire (French pronunciation: [lə fʁɛn syʁ lwaʁ], literally Le Fresne on Loire; Breton: Runonn) is a former commune of the Loire-Atlantique department in western France. On 1 January 2016, it was merged into the new commune of Ingrandes-le-Fresne-sur-Loire, and became part of the Maine-et-Loire department. It is around 25 km west of Angers, and around 50 km east of Nantes.
