= Denée, Maine-et-Loire =

Denée
- Commune
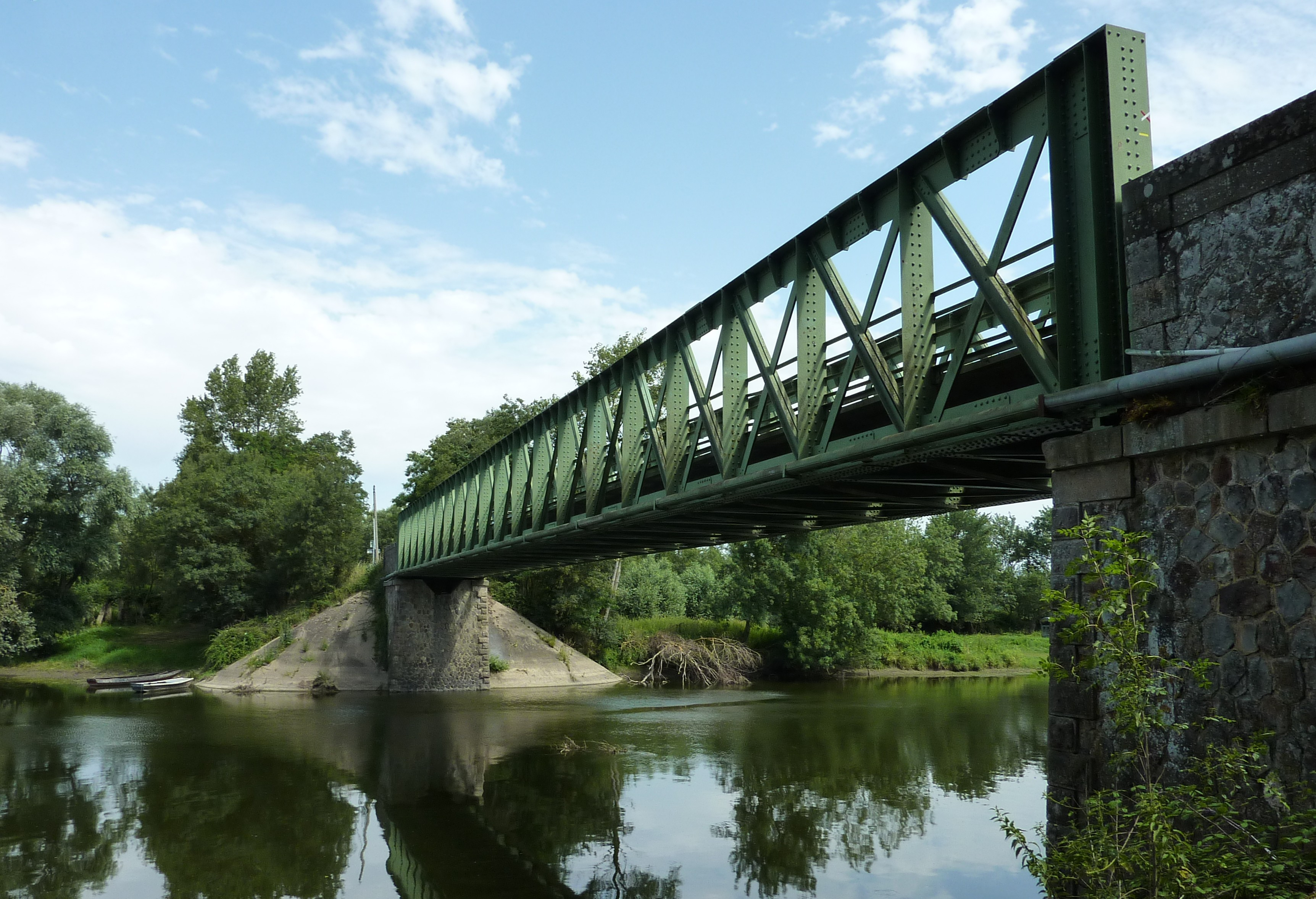
- The Port Qui Tremble Bridge between Saint-Jean-de-la-Croix and Denée

- Coat of arms
- Location of Denée
- Location within France Location within Pays de la Loire
- Coordinates: 47°22′49″N 0°36′24″W
- Country: France
- Region: Pays de la Loire
- Department: Maine-et-Loire
- Arrondissement: Angers
- Canton: Chalonnes-sur-Loire
- Intercommunality: Loire Layon Aubance

Government
  - Mayor (2020–2026): Priscille Guillet
- Area^{1}: 15.6 km^{2} (6.0 sq mi)
- Elevation: 30 m (98 ft)
- Highest elevation: 90 m (300 ft)
- Lowest elevation: 12 m (39 ft)
- Population (2023): 1,449
  - Density: 92.9/km^{2} (241/sq mi)
- Demonym(s): Denéen, Denéenne
- Time zone: UTC+01:00 (CET)
  - Summer (DST): UTC+02:00 (CEST)
- INSEE/Postal code: 49120 /49190
- ^{1} French Land Register data, which excludes lakes, ponds, glaciers > 1 km^{2} (0.386 sq mi or 247 acres) and river estuaries.

Denée (French pronunciation: [dəne]) is a commune in the Maine-et-Loire department in western France.

== See also ==
- Communes of the Maine-et-Loire department
