= Carbay =

- Commune
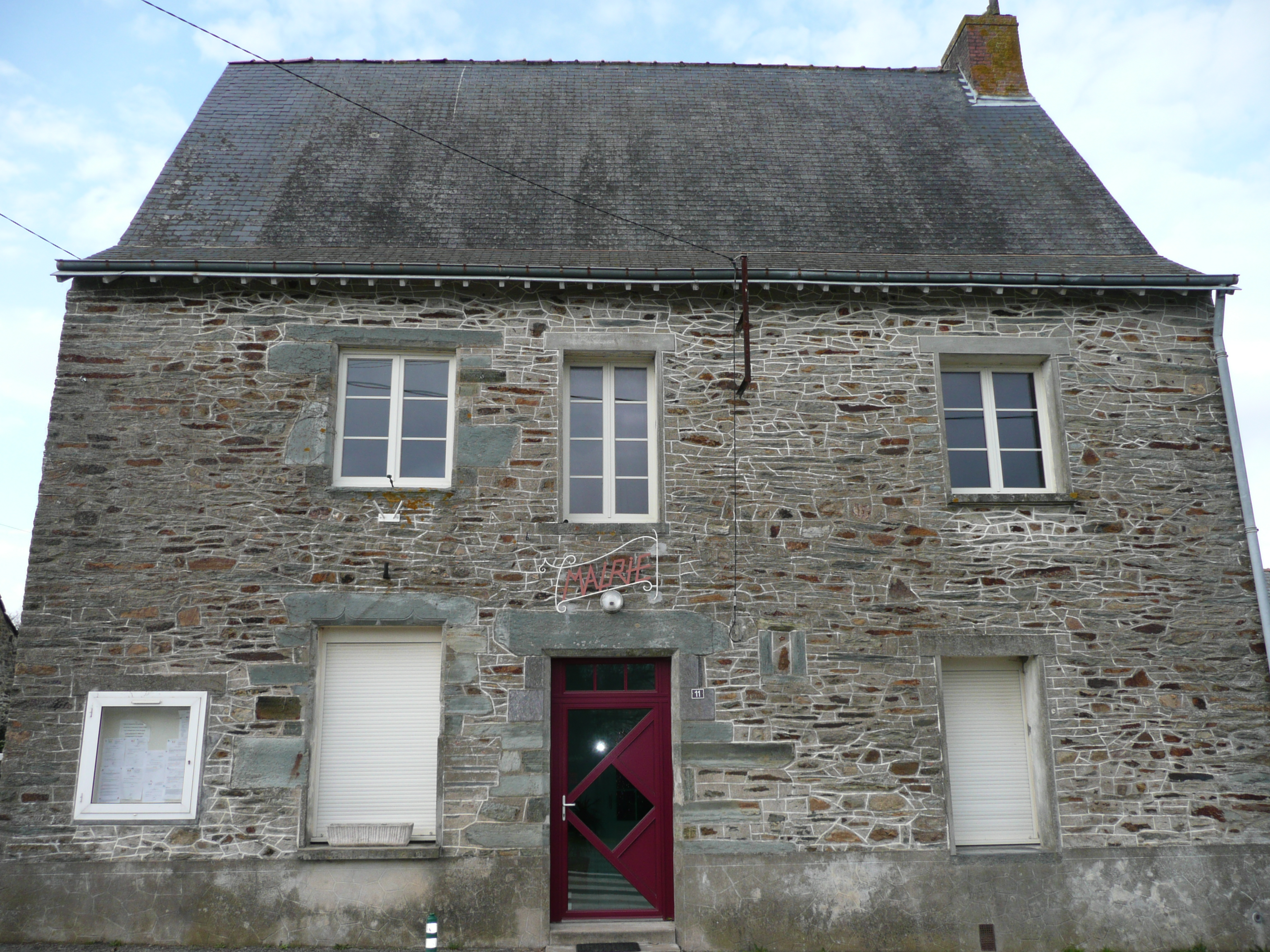
- Carbay town hall
- Location of Carbay
- Location within France Location within Pays de la Loire
- Coordinates: 47°44′00″N 1°13′05″W
- Country: France
- Region: Pays de la Loire
- Department: Maine-et-Loire
- Arrondissement: Segré
- Canton: Segré-en-Anjou Bleu

Government
  - Mayor (2020–2026): Martial Brillet
- Area^{1}: 7.63 km^{2} (2.95 sq mi)
- Elevation: 79 m (259 ft)
- Highest elevation: 101 m (331 ft)
- Lowest elevation: 54 m (177 ft)
- Population (2023): 277
  - Density: 36.3/km^{2} (94.0/sq mi)
- Demonym(s): Carbaisien, Carbaisienne
- Time zone: UTC+01:00 (CET)
  - Summer (DST): UTC+02:00 (CEST)
- INSEE/Postal code: 49056 /49420
- ^{1} French Land Register data, which excludes lakes, ponds, glaciers > 1 km^{2} (0.386 sq mi or 247 acres) and river estuaries.

Carbay (French pronunciation: [kaʁbɛ]) is a commune in the Maine-et-Loire department in western France.

== See also ==
- Communes of the Maine-et-Loire department
