= Bécon-les-Granits =

- Commune
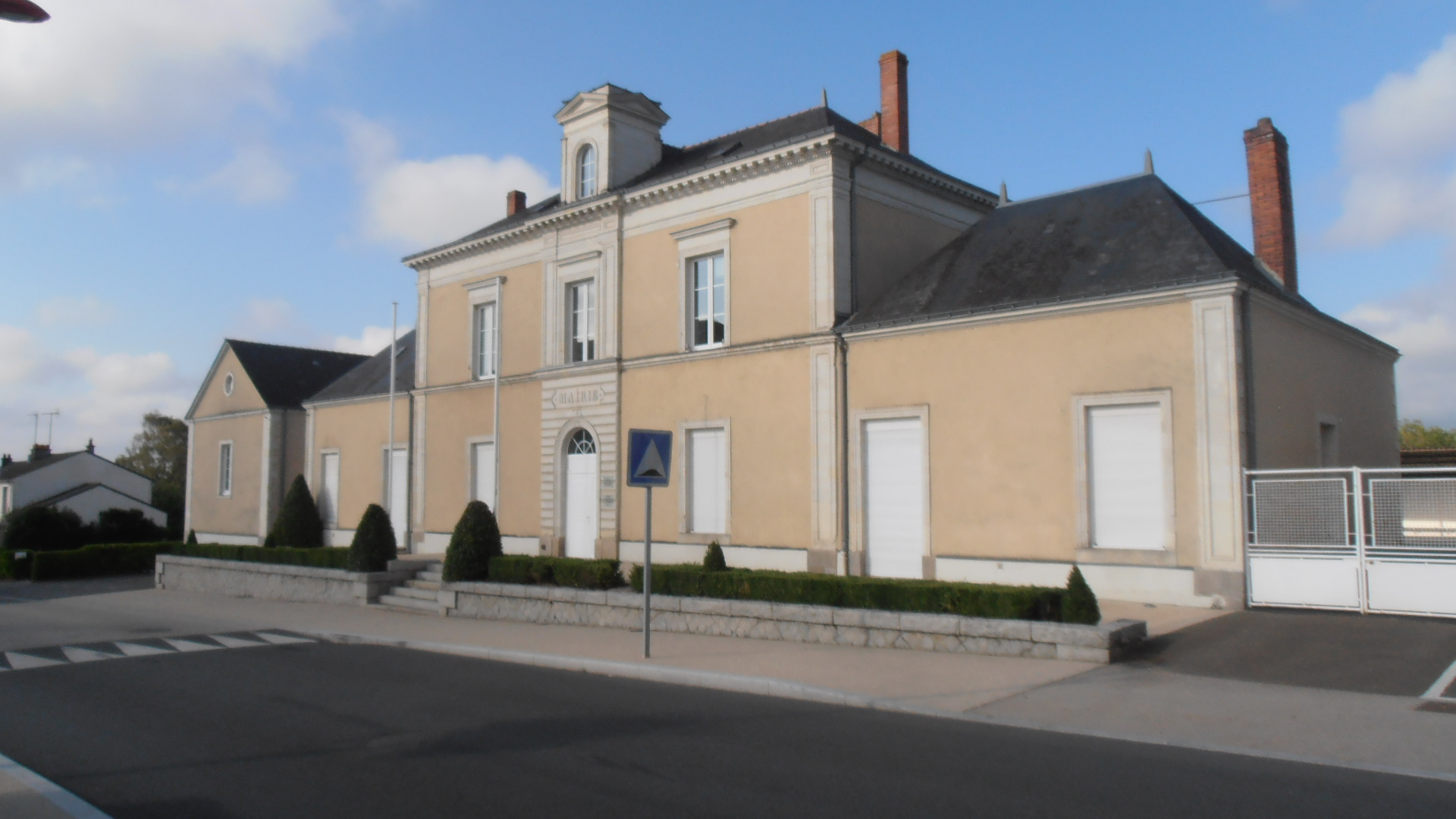
- The town hall of Bécon-les-Granits

- Coat of arms
- Location of Bécon-les-Granits
- Location within France Location within Pays de la Loire
- Coordinates: 47°30′12″N 0°47′59″W
- Country: France
- Region: Pays de la Loire
- Department: Maine-et-Loire
- Arrondissement: Segré
- Canton: Chalonnes-sur-Loire

Government
  - Mayor (2020–2026): Marie-Ange Fouchereau
- Area^{1}: 46.17 km^{2} (17.83 sq mi)
- Elevation: 65 m (213 ft)
- Highest elevation: 88 m (289 ft)
- Lowest elevation: 18 m (59 ft)
- Population (2023): 2,811
  - Density: 60.88/km^{2} (157.7/sq mi)
- Time zone: UTC+01:00 (CET)
  - Summer (DST): UTC+02:00 (CEST)
- INSEE/Postal code: 49026 /49370
- ^{1} French Land Register data, which excludes lakes, ponds, glaciers > 1 km^{2} (0.386 sq mi or 247 acres) and river estuaries.

Bécon-les-Granits (French pronunciation: [bekɔ̃ le ɡʁanit]) is a commune in the Maine-et-Loire department in western France.

== Population ==
Historical population

| Year | Pop. | ±% p.a. |
|---|---|---|
| 1793 | 1,444 | — |
| 1821 | 1,310 | −0.35% |
| 1846 | 1,914 | +1.53% |
| 1872 | 2,057 | +0.28% |
| 1901 | 2,036 | −0.04% |
| 1926 | 1,830 | −0.43% |
| 1946 | 1,658 | −0.49% |
| 1962 | 1,606 | −0.20% |
| 1968 | 1,563 | −0.45% |

| Year | Pop. | ±% p.a. |
|---|---|---|
| 1975 | 1,432 | −1.24% |
| 1982 | 1,820 | +3.48% |
| 1990 | 2,252 | +2.70% |
| 1999 | 2,327 | +0.36% |
| 2007 | 2,601 | +1.40% |
| 2012 | 2,714 | +0.85% |
| 2017 | 2,803 | +0.65% |
| 2023 | 2,811 | +0.05% |

Source: EHESS and INSEE (1968-2023)

== See also ==
- Communes of the Maine-et-Loire department
