= Val d'Erdre-Auxence =

- Commune
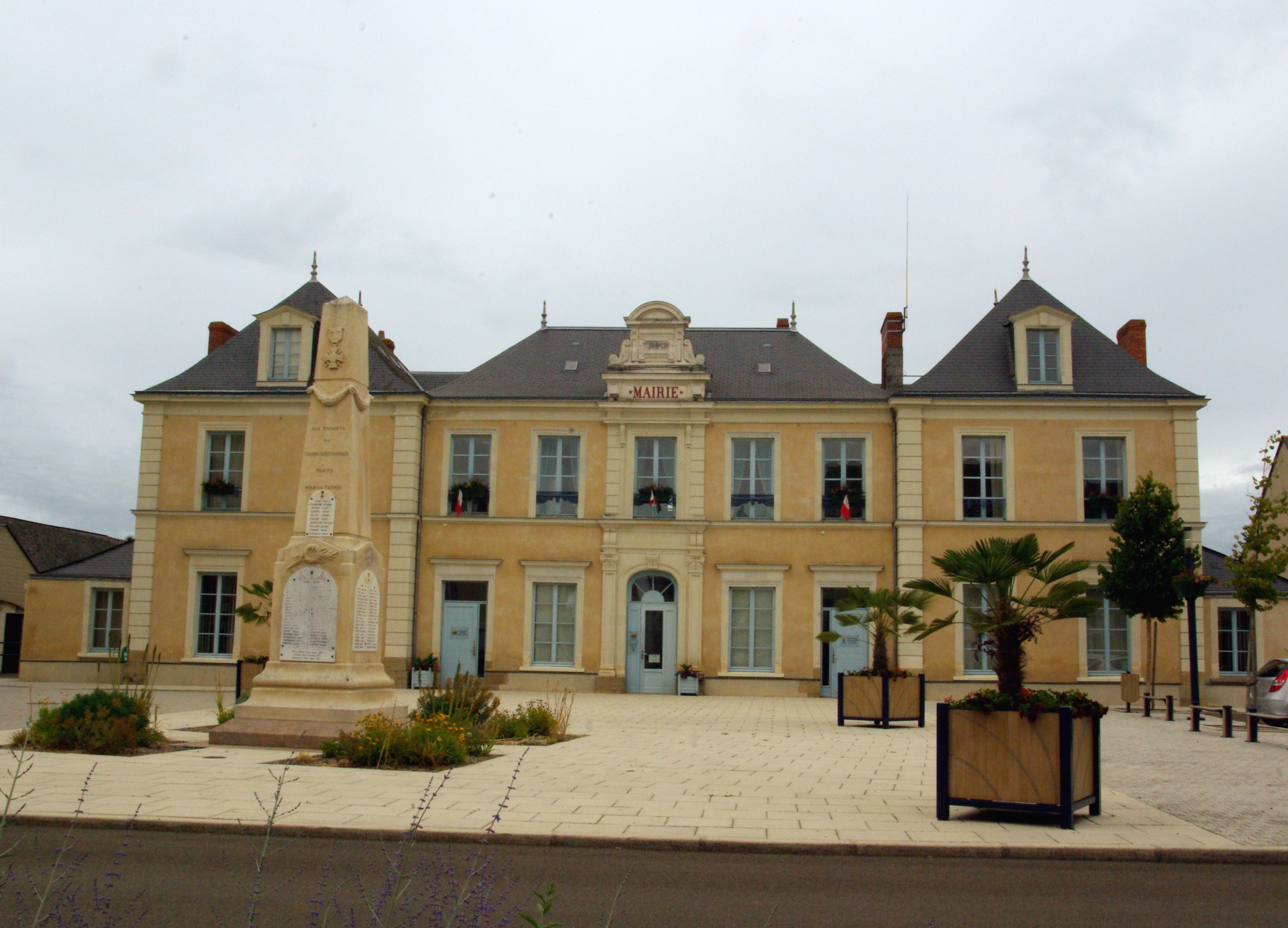
- The town hall in Louroux-Béconnais
- Location of Val d'Erdre-Auxence
- Location within France Location within Pays de la Loire
- Coordinates: 47°31′23″N 0°53′06″W
- Country: France
- Region: Pays de la Loire
- Department: Maine-et-Loire
- Arrondissement: Segré
- Canton: Chalonnes-sur-Loire
- Intercommunality: Vallées du Haut-Anjou
- Area^{1}: 213.22 km^{2} (82.32 sq mi)
- Population (2023): 4,981
  - Density: 23.36/km^{2} (60.50/sq mi)
- Time zone: UTC+01:00 (CET)
  - Summer (DST): UTC+02:00 (CEST)
- INSEE/Postal code: 49183 /49370
- ^{1} French Land Register data, which excludes lakes, ponds, glaciers > 1 km^{2} (0.386 sq mi or 247 acres) and river estuaries.

Val d'Erdre-Auxence (French pronunciation: [val dɛʁdʁ oksɑ̃s]) is a commune in the Maine-et-Loire department of western France. The municipality was established on 15 December 2016 and consists of the former communes of La Cornuaille, Le Louroux-Béconnais and Villemoisan.

== Population ==
Population data refer to the area corresponding with the commune as of January 2025.

Historical population
Year	Pop.	±% p.a.
1968	3,250	—
1975	3,066	−0.83%
1982	3,165	+0.46%
1990	3,206	+0.16%
1999	3,351	+0.49%
2007	4,181	+2.80%
2012	4,617	+2.00%
2017	4,892	+1.16%
2023	4,981	+0.30%
Source: INSEE

== See also ==
- Communes of the Maine-et-Loire department
