= Rochefort-sur-Loire =

- Commune
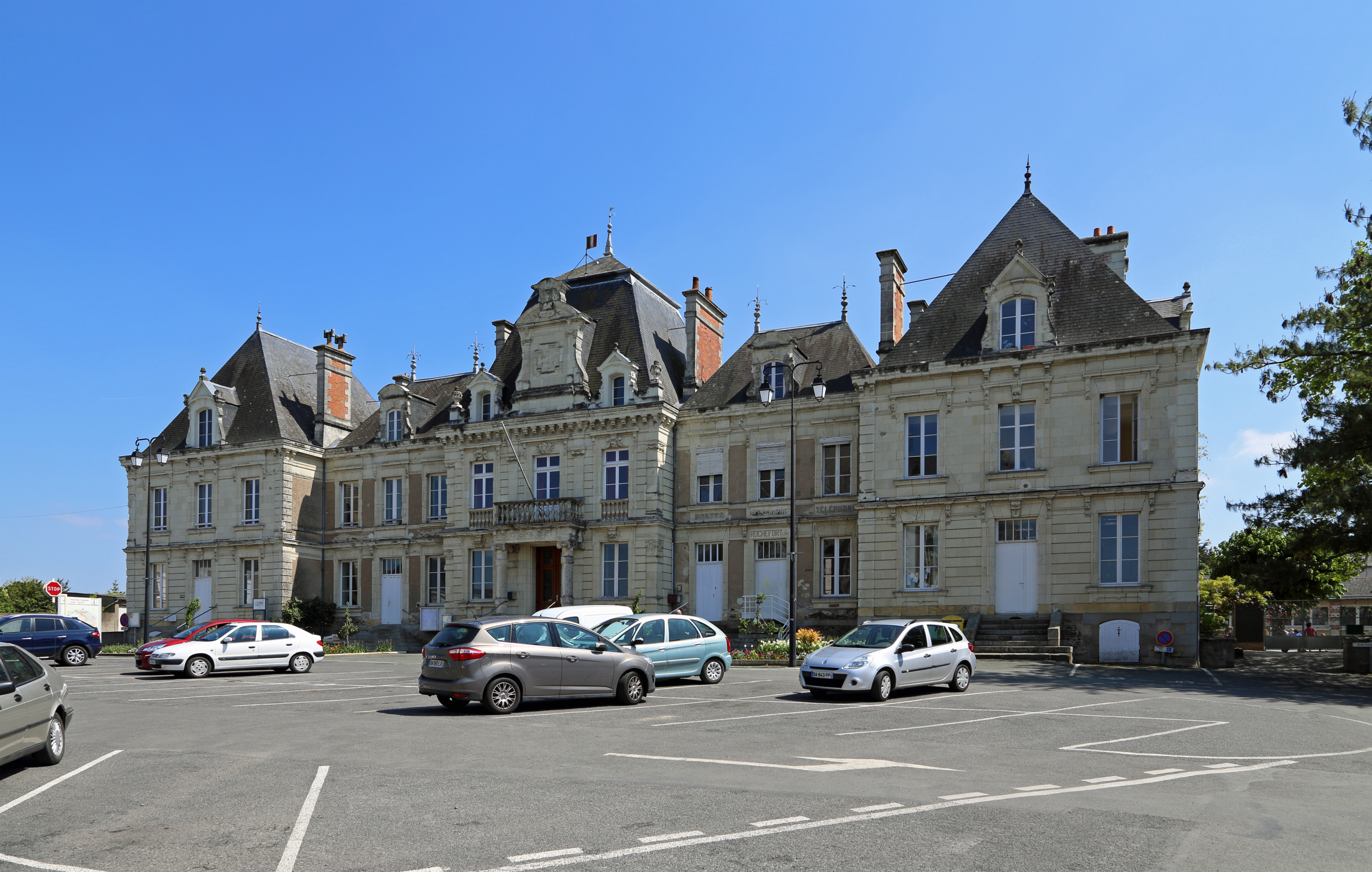
- Town hall of Rochefort-sur-Loire

- Coat of arms
- Location of Rochefort-sur-Loire
- Location within France Location within Pays de la Loire
- Coordinates: 47°21′28″N 0°39′17″W
- Country: France
- Region: Pays de la Loire
- Department: Maine-et-Loire
- Arrondissement: Angers
- Canton: Chalonnes-sur-Loire
- Intercommunality: Loire Layon Aubance

Government
  - Mayor (2022–2026): Didier Le Gall
- Area^{1}: 27.8 km^{2} (10.7 sq mi)
- Highest elevation: 104 m (341 ft)
- Lowest elevation: 12 m (39 ft)
- Population (2023): 2,333
  - Density: 83.9/km^{2} (217/sq mi)
- Demonym(s): Rochefortais, Rochefortaise
- Time zone: UTC+01:00 (CET)
  - Summer (DST): UTC+02:00 (CEST)
- INSEE/Postal code: 49259 /49190
- ^{1} French Land Register data, which excludes lakes, ponds, glaciers > 1 km^{2} (0.386 sq mi or 247 acres) and river estuaries.

Rochefort-sur-Loire (French pronunciation: [ʁɔʃfɔʁ syʁ lwaʁ], literally Rochefort on Loire) is a commune in the Maine-et-Loire department in western France.

== Geography ==
The commune is traversed by the river Layon.

== Population ==
Historical population
Year	Pop.	±% p.a.
1968	1,618	—
1975	1,620	+0.02%
1982	1,814	+1.63%
1990	1,877	+0.43%
1999	1,991	+0.66%
2007	2,127	+0.83%
2012	2,274	+1.35%
2017	2,355	+0.70%
2023	2,333	−0.16%
Source: INSEE

== See also ==
- Communes of the Maine-et-Loire department
- Baumard winery
