= Saint-Augustin-des-Bois =

- Commune
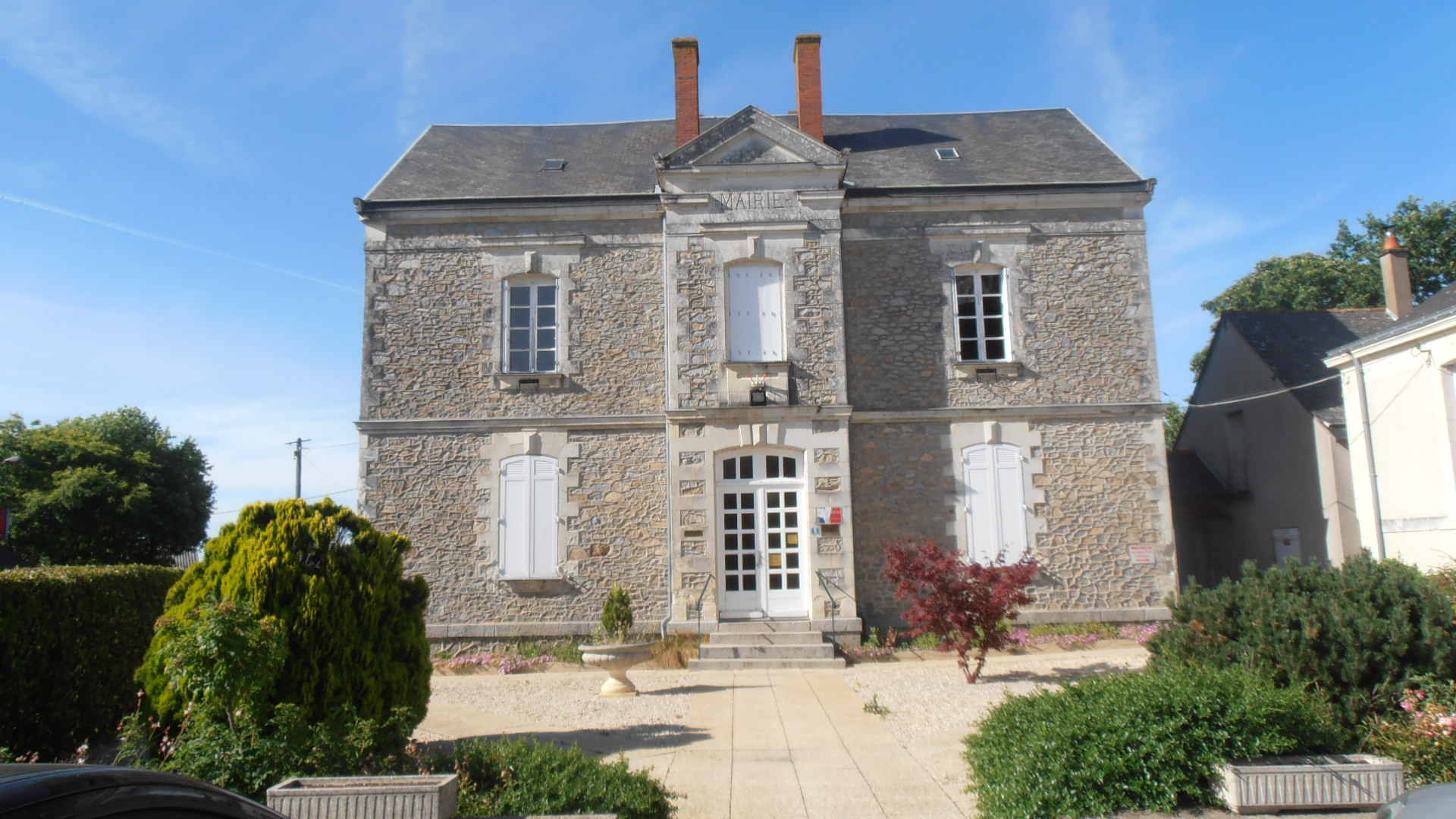
- The town hall
- Location of Saint-Augustin-des-Bois
- Location within France Location within Pays de la Loire
- Coordinates: 47°27′36″N 0°47′38″W
- Country: France
- Region: Pays de la Loire
- Department: Maine-et-Loire
- Arrondissement: Segré
- Canton: Chalonnes-sur-Loire
- Intercommunality: Vallées du Haut-Anjou

Government
  - Mayor (2020–2026): Virginie Guichard
- Area^{1}: 27.28 km^{2} (10.53 sq mi)
- Elevation: 83 m (272 ft)
- Highest elevation: 84 m (276 ft)
- Lowest elevation: 12 m (39 ft)
- Population (2023): 1,295
  - Density: 47.47/km^{2} (122.9/sq mi)
- Time zone: UTC+01:00 (CET)
  - Summer (DST): UTC+02:00 (CEST)
- INSEE/Postal code: 49266 /49170
- ^{1} French Land Register data, which excludes lakes, ponds, glaciers > 1 km^{2} (0.386 sq mi or 247 acres) and river estuaries.

Saint-Augustin-des-Bois (French pronunciation: [sɛ̃.t‿oɡystɛ̃ de bwa]) is a commune in the Maine-et-Loire department in western France.

== See also ==
- Communes of the Maine-et-Loire department
