= Saint-Germain-des-Prés, Maine-et-Loire =

Saint-Germain-des-Prés
- Commune
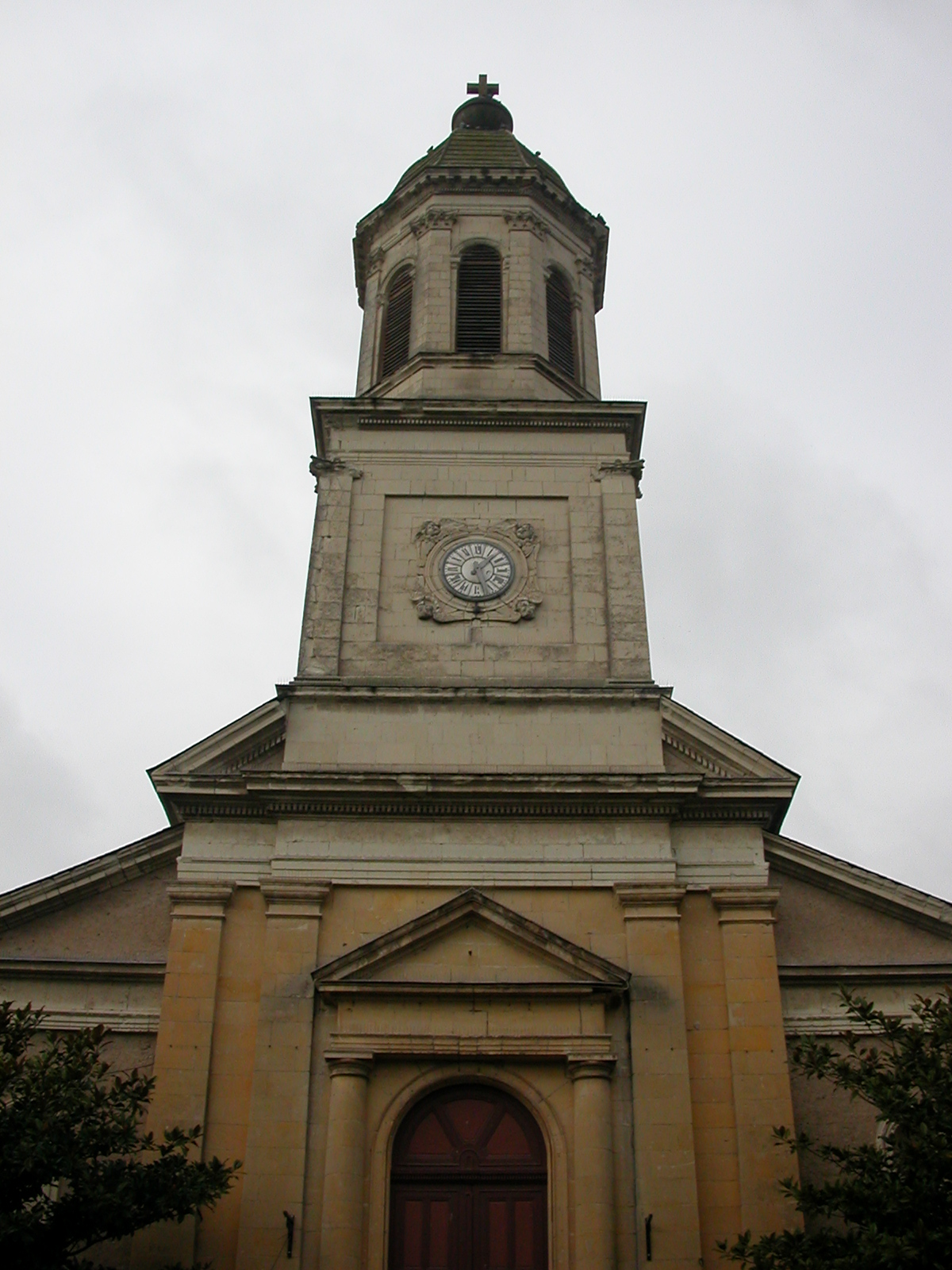
- The church of Saint-Germain-des-Prés

- Coat of arms
- Location of Saint-Germain-des-Prés
- Location within France Location within Pays de la Loire
- Coordinates: 47°24′36″N 0°49′58″W
- Country: France
- Region: Pays de la Loire
- Department: Maine-et-Loire
- Arrondissement: Angers
- Canton: Chalonnes-sur-Loire

Government
  - Mayor (2020–2026): Nicolas Benetta
- Area^{1}: 19.76 km^{2} (7.63 sq mi)
- Elevation: 29 m (95 ft)
- Highest elevation: 71 m (233 ft)
- Lowest elevation: 10 m (33 ft)
- Population (2023): 1,388
  - Density: 70.24/km^{2} (181.9/sq mi)
- Time zone: UTC+01:00 (CET)
  - Summer (DST): UTC+02:00 (CEST)
- INSEE/Postal code: 49284 /49170
- ^{1} French Land Register data, which excludes lakes, ponds, glaciers > 1 km^{2} (0.386 sq mi or 247 acres) and river estuaries.

Saint-Germain-des-Prés (French pronunciation: [sɛ̃ ʒɛʁmɛ̃ de pʁe]) is a commune in the Maine-et-Loire department in western France.

== See also ==
- Communes of the Maine-et-Loire department
