= Bouillé-Ménard =

- Commune
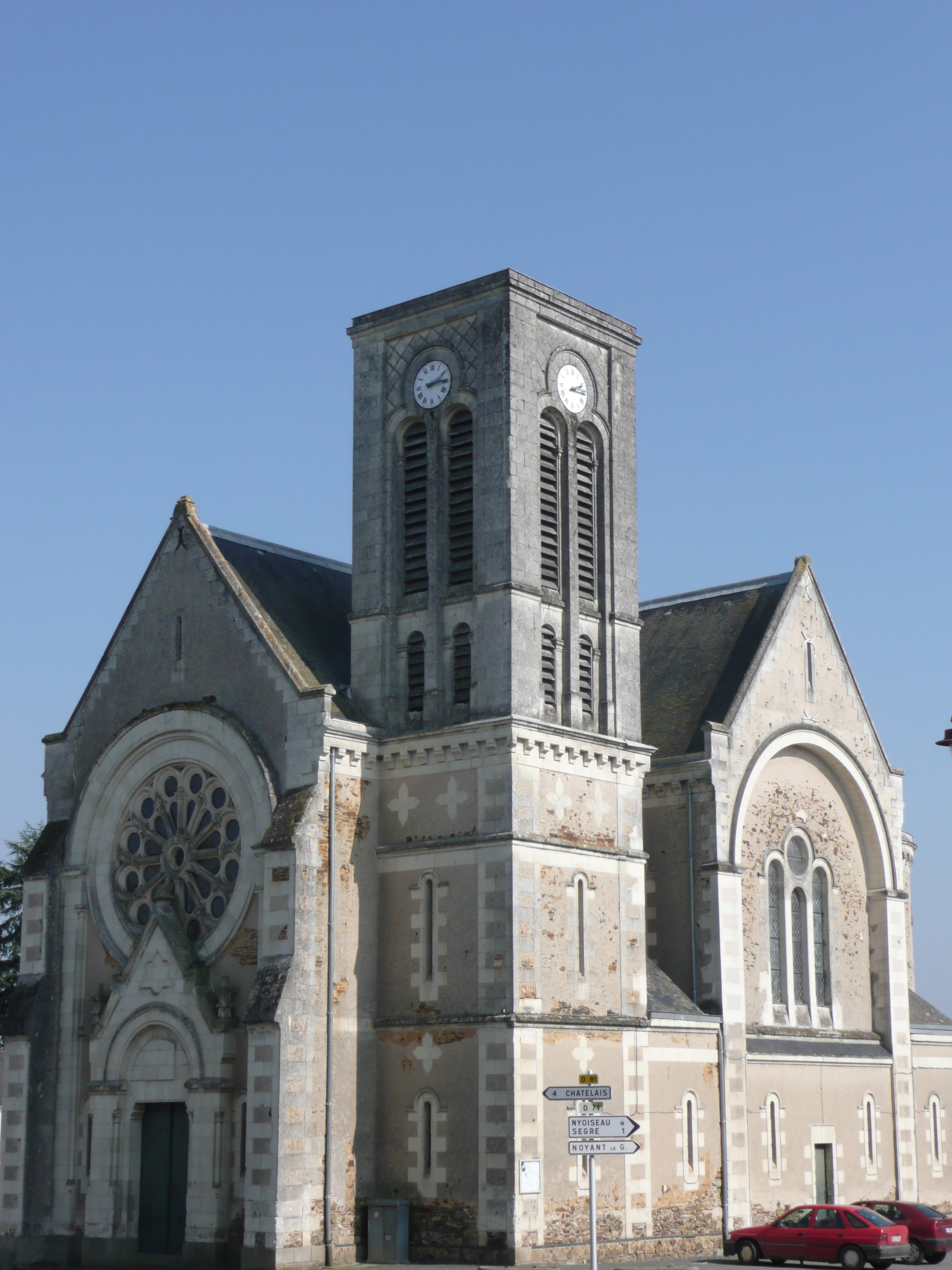
- The church in Bouillé-Ménard
- Location of Bouillé-Ménard
- Location within France Location within Pays de la Loire
- Coordinates: 47°44′33″N 0°58′00″W
- Country: France
- Region: Pays de la Loire
- Department: Maine-et-Loire
- Arrondissement: Segré
- Canton: Segré-en-Anjou Bleu

Government
  - Mayor (2020–2026): Yannick Galon
- Area^{1}: 15.79 km^{2} (6.10 sq mi)
- Elevation: 99 m (325 ft)
- Highest elevation: 104 m (341 ft)
- Lowest elevation: 32 m (105 ft)
- Population (2023): 785
  - Density: 49.7/km^{2} (129/sq mi)
- Time zone: UTC+01:00 (CET)
  - Summer (DST): UTC+02:00 (CEST)
- INSEE/Postal code: 49036 /49520
- ^{1} French Land Register data, which excludes lakes, ponds, glaciers > 1 km^{2} (0.386 sq mi or 247 acres) and river estuaries.

Bouillé-Ménard (French pronunciation: [buje menaʁ]) is a commune in the Maine-et-Loire department in western France. It is the antipode of the Bounty Islands.

== Population ==
Historical population
Year	Pop.	±% p.a.
1968	891	—
1975	746	−2.51%
1982	733	−0.25%
1990	719	−0.24%
1999	638	−1.32%
2007	728	+1.66%
2012	734	+0.16%
2017	750	+0.43%
2023	785	+0.76%
Source: INSEE

== See also ==
- Communes of the Maine-et-Loire department
