= Bourg-l'Évêque =

- Commune
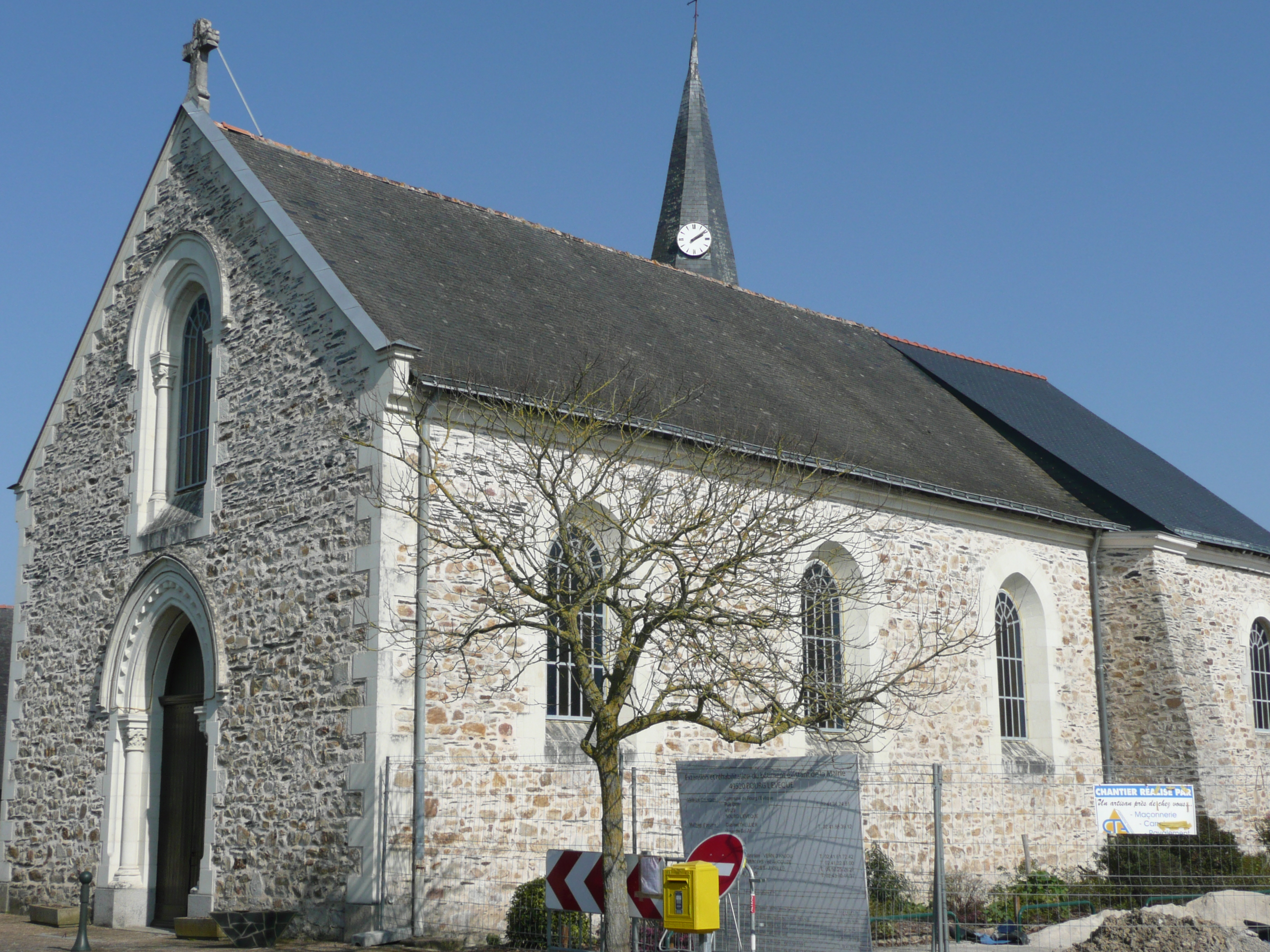
- The church in Bourg-l'Évêque
- Location of Bourg-l'Évêque
- Location within France Location within Pays de la Loire
- Coordinates: 47°44′12″N 1°00′43″W
- Country: France
- Region: Pays de la Loire
- Department: Maine-et-Loire
- Arrondissement: Segré
- Canton: Segré-en-Anjou Bleu

Government
  - Mayor (2020–2026): Hervé Gaudin
- Area^{1}: 5.29 km^{2} (2.04 sq mi)
- Elevation: 111 m (364 ft)
- Highest elevation: 103 m (338 ft)
- Lowest elevation: 54 m (177 ft)
- Population (2023): 236
  - Density: 44.6/km^{2} (116/sq mi)
- Time zone: UTC+01:00 (CET)
  - Summer (DST): UTC+02:00 (CEST)
- INSEE/Postal code: 49038 /49520
- ^{1} French Land Register data, which excludes lakes, ponds, glaciers > 1 km^{2} (0.386 sq mi or 247 acres) and river estuaries.

Bourg-l'Évêque (French pronunciation: [buʁ levɛk]) is a commune in the Maine-et-Loire department in western France.

== Population ==
Historical population
Year	Pop.	±% p.a.
1968	319	—
1975	255	−3.15%
1982	207	−2.94%
1990	198	−0.55%
1999	214	+0.87%
2007	212	−0.12%
2012	220	+0.74%
2017	251	+2.67%
2023	236	−1.02%
Source: INSEE

== See also ==
- Communes of the Maine-et-Loire department
