= Ingrandes-le-Fresne-sur-Loire =

- Commune
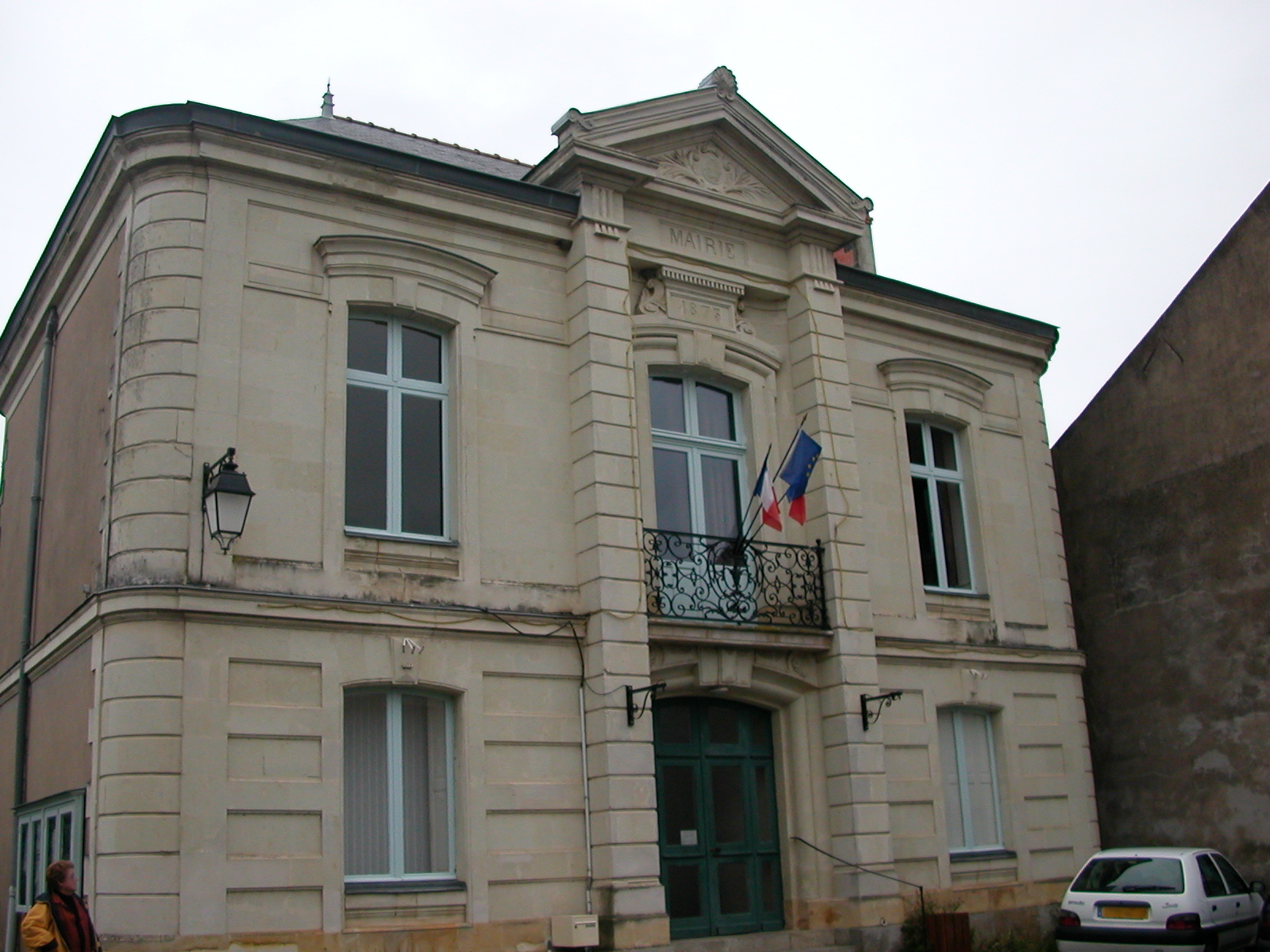
- The town hall in Ingrandes
- Location of Ingrandes-le-Fresne-sur-Loire
- Location within France Location within Pays de la Loire
- Coordinates: 47°24′14″N 0°55′16″W
- Country: France
- Region: Pays de la Loire
- Department: Maine-et-Loire
- Arrondissement: Angers
- Canton: Chalonnes-sur-Loire

Government
  - Mayor (2024–2026): Alain Tusseau
- Area^{1}: 25.66 km^{2} (9.91 sq mi)
- Population (2023): 3,071
  - Density: 119.7/km^{2} (310.0/sq mi)
- Time zone: UTC+01:00 (CET)
  - Summer (DST): UTC+02:00 (CEST)
- INSEE/Postal code: 49160 /49123
- ^{1} French Land Register data, which excludes lakes, ponds, glaciers > 1 km^{2} (0.386 sq mi or 247 acres) and river estuaries.

Ingrandes-le-Fresne-sur-Loire (French pronunciation: [ɛ̃ɡʁɑ̃d lə fʁɛn syʁ lwaʁ], literally Ingrandes-le-Fresne on Loire; before 2024: Ingrandes-Le Fresne sur Loire; Breton: Ingrandes-Runonn) is a commune in the Maine-et-Loire department of western France. The commune was established on 1 January 2016 and consists of the former communes of Ingrandes and Le Fresne-sur-Loire (previously part of the Loire-Atlantique department). On 1 January 2024, the former commune of Saint-Sigismond was merged into Ingrandes-le-Fresne-sur-Loire.

== Population ==
Population data refer to the area corresponding with the commune as of January 2025.

Historical population
Year	Pop.	±% p.a.
1968	2,520	—
1975	2,588	+0.38%
1982	2,500	−0.49%
1990	2,410	−0.46%
1999	2,430	+0.09%
2007	2,916	+2.31%
2012	2,998	+0.56%
2017	3,005	+0.05%
2023	3,071	+0.36%
Source: INSEE

== See also ==
- Communes of the Maine-et-Loire department
