= Saint-Georges-sur-Loire =

- Commune
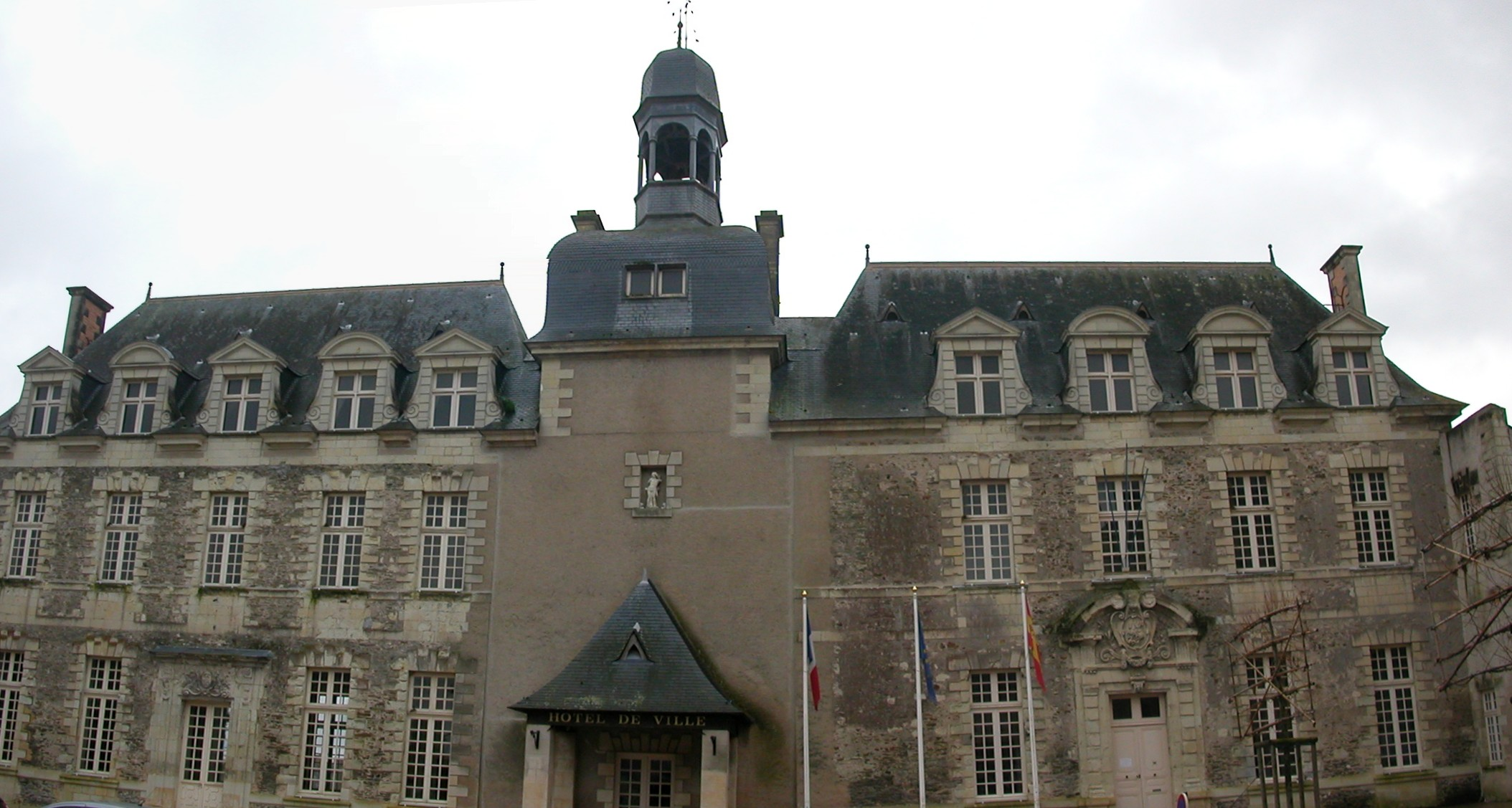
- The town hall of Saint-Georges-sur-Loire

- Coat of arms
- Location of Saint-Georges-sur-Loire
- Location within France Location within Pays de la Loire
- Coordinates: 47°24′36″N 0°45′40″W
- Country: France
- Region: Pays de la Loire
- Department: Maine-et-Loire
- Arrondissement: Angers
- Canton: Chalonnes-sur-Loire

Government
  - Mayor (2020–2026): Philippe Maillart
- Area^{1}: 33.36 km^{2} (12.88 sq mi)
- Elevation: 20 m (66 ft)
- Highest elevation: 81 m (266 ft)
- Lowest elevation: 11 m (36 ft)
- Population (2023): 3,836
  - Density: 115.0/km^{2} (297.8/sq mi)
- Time zone: UTC+01:00 (CET)
  - Summer (DST): UTC+02:00 (CEST)
- INSEE/Postal code: 49283 /49170
- ^{1} French Land Register data, which excludes lakes, ponds, glaciers > 1 km^{2} (0.386 sq mi or 247 acres) and river estuaries.

Saint-Georges-sur-Loire (French pronunciation: [sɛ̃ ʒɔʁʒ syʁ lwaʁ], literally Saint-Georges on Loire) is a commune in the Maine-et-Loire department in western France.

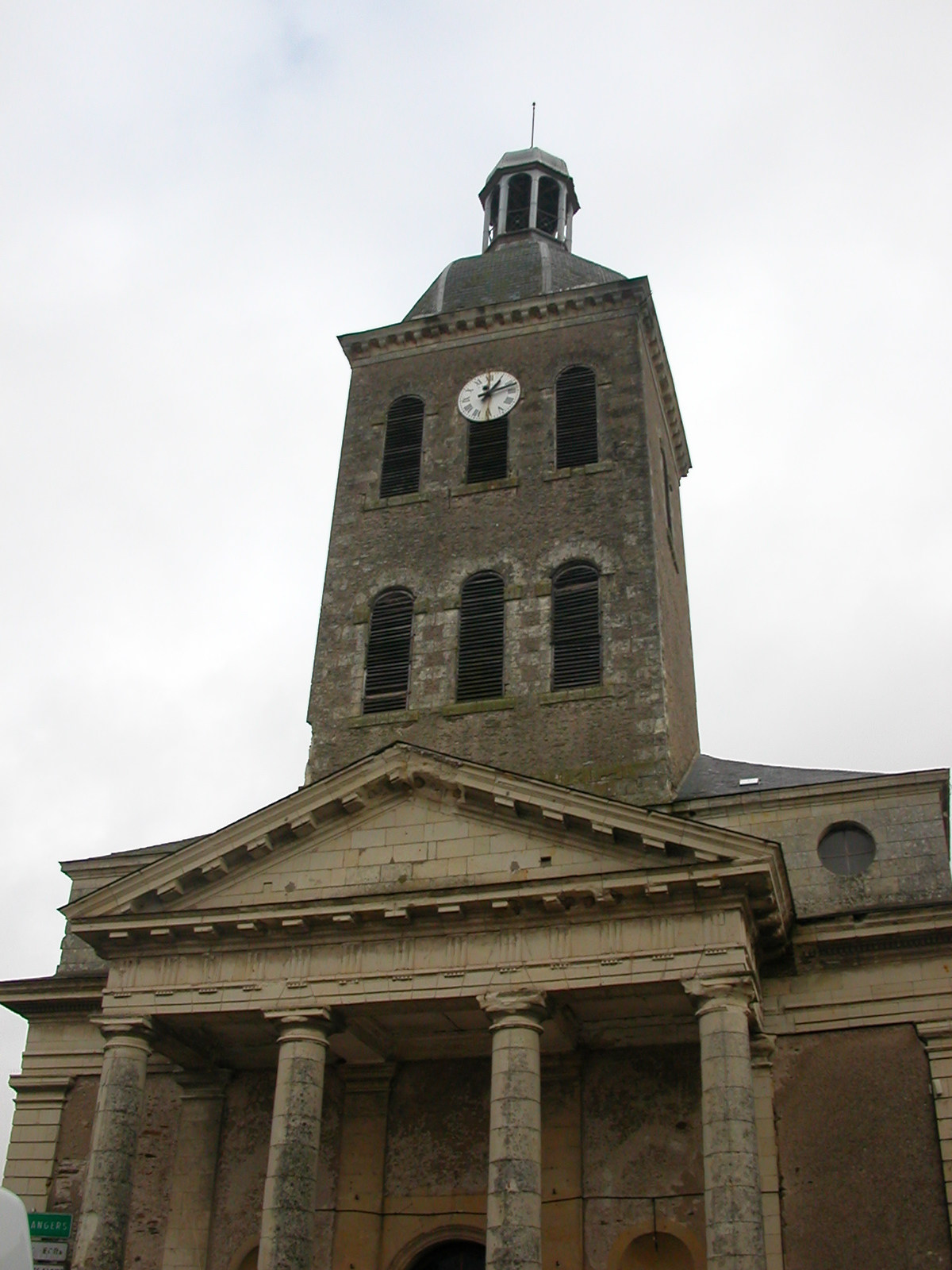
Saint George's church

== Population ==
Historical population
Year	Pop.	±% p.a.
1968	2,001	—
1975	2,330	+2.20%
1982	3,015	+3.75%
1990	3,101	+0.35%
1999	3,011	−0.33%
2007	3,241	+0.92%
2012	3,465	+1.35%
2017	3,610	+0.82%
2023	3,836	+1.02%
Source: INSEE

== See also ==
- Communes of the Maine-et-Loire department
