= Erdre-en-Anjou =

- Commune
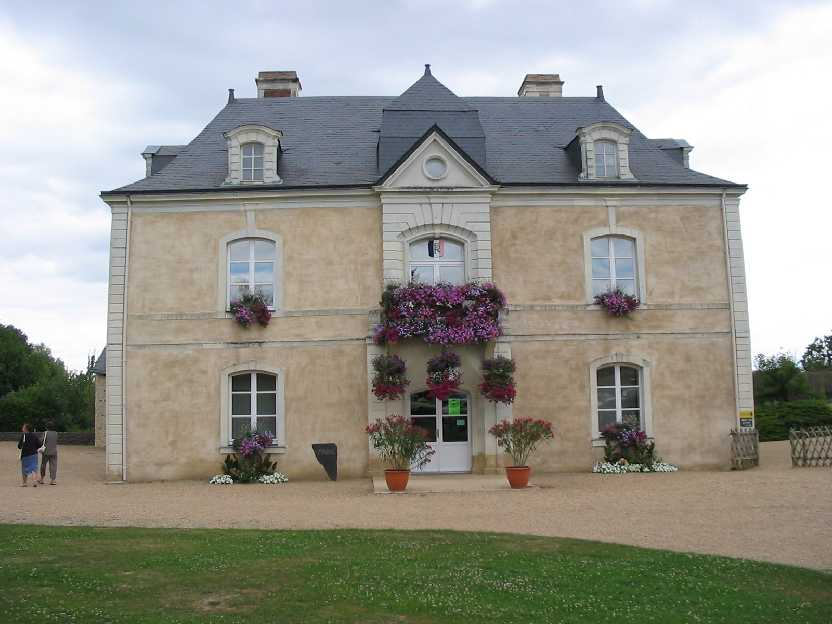
- The town hall of Brain-sur-Longuenée
- Location of Erdre-en-Anjou
- Location within France Location within Pays de la Loire
- Coordinates: 47°36′04″N 0°50′06″W
- Country: France
- Region: Pays de la Loire
- Department: Maine-et-Loire
- Arrondissement: Segré
- Canton: Chalonnes-sur-Loire, Tiercé

Government
  - Mayor (2021–2026): Yamina Riou
- Area^{1}: 89.94 km^{2} (34.73 sq mi)
- Population (2023): 5,771
  - Density: 64.16/km^{2} (166.2/sq mi)
- Time zone: UTC+01:00 (CET)
  - Summer (DST): UTC+02:00 (CEST)
- INSEE/Postal code: 49367 /49220, 49370
- ^{1} French Land Register data, which excludes lakes, ponds, glaciers > 1 km^{2} (0.386 sq mi or 247 acres) and river estuaries.

Erdre-en-Anjou (French pronunciation: [ɛʁdʁ ɑ̃.n‿ɑ̃ʒu], literally Erdre in Anjou) is a commune in the Maine-et-Loire department of western France. Vern-d'Anjou is the municipal seat.

== History ==
It was established on 28 December 2015 and consists of the former communes of Brain-sur-Longuenée, Gené, La Pouëze and Vern-d'Anjou.

== Population ==
The population data given in the table below refer to the commune in its geography as of January 2025.

Historical population
Year	Pop.	±% p.a.
1968	3,583	—
1975	3,388	−0.80%
1982	3,647	+1.06%
1990	3,823	+0.59%
1999	4,011	+0.53%
2007	4,844	+2.39%
2012	5,630	+3.05%
2017	5,746	+0.41%
2023	5,771	+0.07%
Source: INSEE

== See also ==
- Communes of the Maine-et-Loire department
