= Angrie =

- Commune
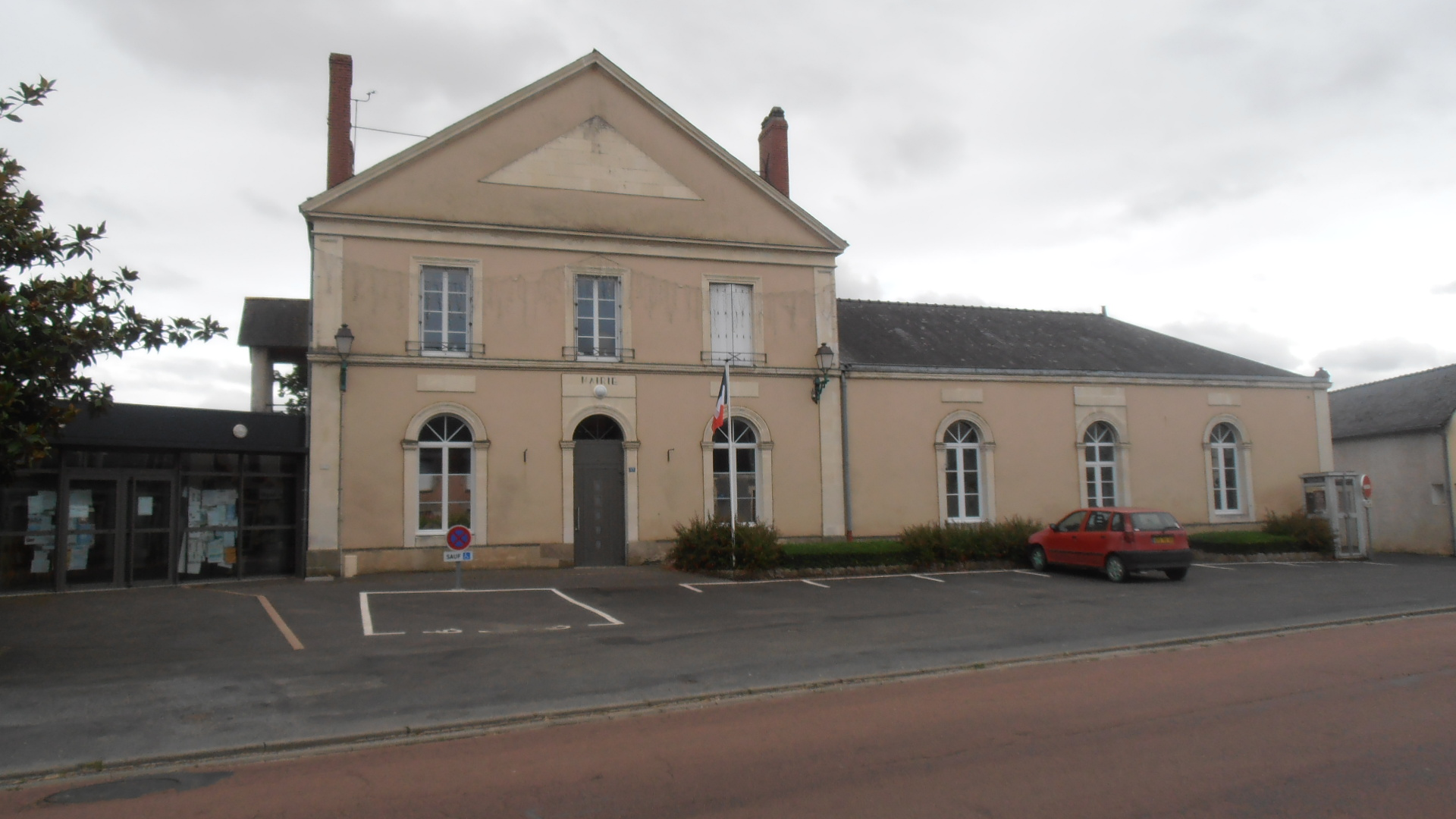
- The town hall of Angrie
- Location of Angrie
- Location within France Location within Pays de la Loire
- Coordinates: 47°34′15″N 0°58′20″W
- Country: France
- Region: Pays de la Loire
- Department: Maine-et-Loire
- Arrondissement: Segré
- Canton: Segré-en-Anjou Bleu
- Intercommunality: Anjou Bleu Communauté

Government
  - Mayor (2020–2026): Marie-Noëlle Richard
- Area^{1}: 40.93 km^{2} (15.80 sq mi)
- Elevation: 64 m (210 ft)
- Highest elevation: 88 m (289 ft)
- Lowest elevation: 36 m (118 ft)
- Population (2023): 913
  - Density: 22.3/km^{2} (57.8/sq mi)
- Time zone: UTC+01:00 (CET)
  - Summer (DST): UTC+02:00 (CEST)
- INSEE/Postal code: 49008 /49440
- ^{1} French Land Register data, which excludes lakes, ponds, glaciers > 1 km^{2} (0.386 sq mi or 247 acres) and river estuaries.

Angrie (French pronunciation: [ɑ̃ɡʁi]) is a commune in the Maine-et-Loire department in western France.

== Population ==
Historical population
Year	Pop.	±% p.a.
1968	925	—
1975	787	−2.28%
1982	704	−1.58%
1990	700	−0.07%
1999	678	−0.35%
2007	866	+3.11%
2012	979	+2.48%
2017	949	−0.62%
2023	913	−0.64%
Source: INSEE

== See also ==
- Communes of the Maine-et-Loire department
