= Candé =

- Commune
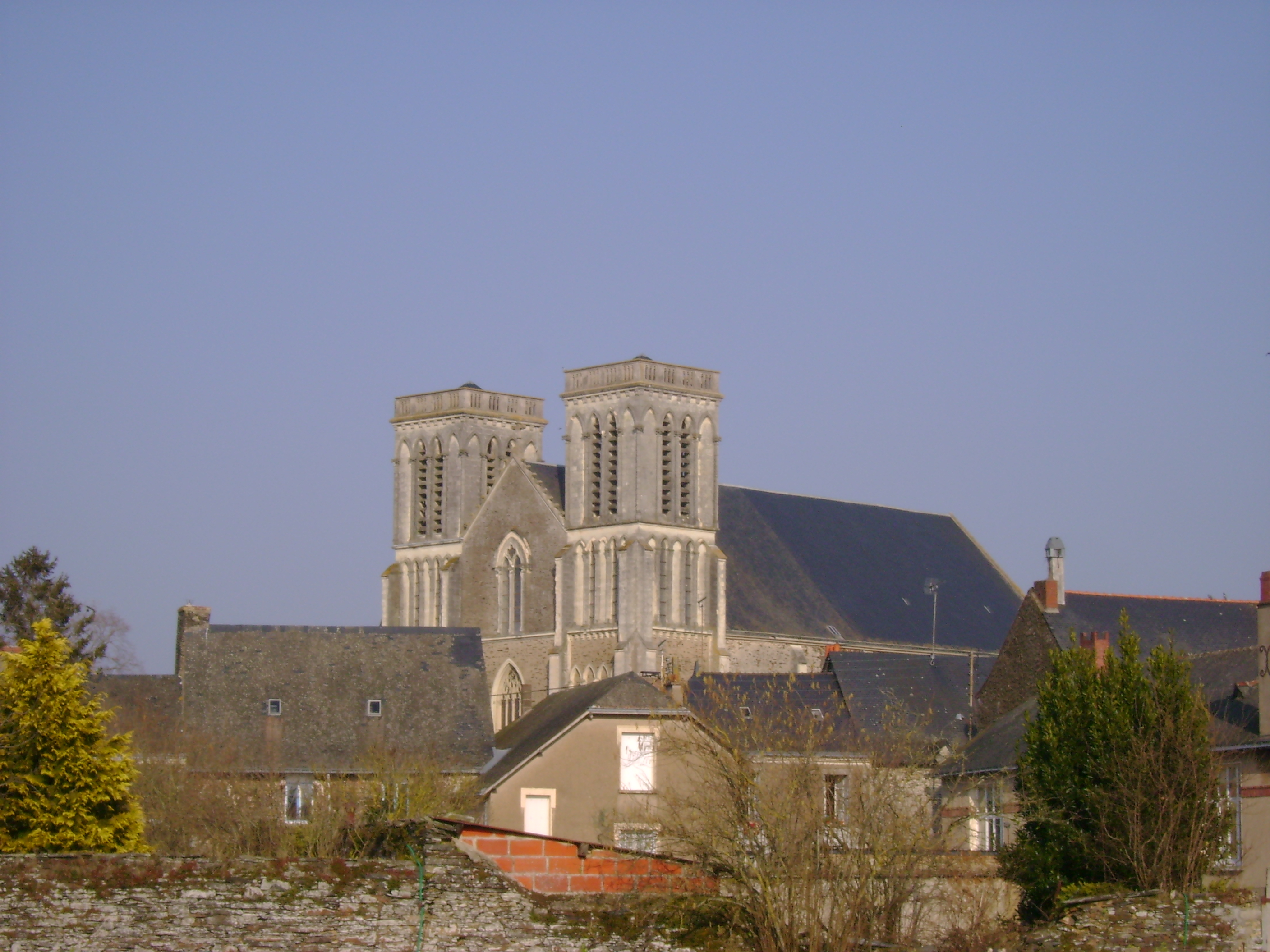
- The church and the old town

- Coat of arms
- Location of Candé
- Location within France Location within Pays de la Loire
- Coordinates: 47°33′42″N 1°02′09″W
- Country: France
- Region: Pays de la Loire
- Department: Maine-et-Loire
- Arrondissement: Segré
- Canton: Segré-en-Anjou Bleu

Government
  - Mayor (2020–2026): Pascal Crossouard
- Area^{1}: 4.91 km^{2} (1.90 sq mi)
- Population (2023): 2,801
  - Density: 570/km^{2} (1,480/sq mi)
- Time zone: UTC+01:00 (CET)
  - Summer (DST): UTC+02:00 (CEST)
- INSEE/Postal code: 49054 /49440
- Dialling codes: 0241
- ^{1} French Land Register data, which excludes lakes, ponds, glaciers > 1 km^{2} (0.386 sq mi or 247 acres) and river estuaries.

Candé (French pronunciation: [kɑ̃de]) is a commune in the Maine-et-Loire department in western France.

== History ==
In the 11th century the village became an important military site for Anjou under baron Rorgon de Candé, at Fort-Castle of Candé.

Candé was noted in 2000-2001 as the residence of Marie Bremont, then the world's oldest person, who died at age 115.

== Name ==
Candé comes from the a Celtic word condate which means confluence. There are two other villages in France with similar names:

- Candé-sur-Beuvron in Loir-et-Cher (pop 1,208) - 170 km (110 mi) from Candé.
- Candes-Saint-Martin in Indre-et-Loire (pop 227) - 90 km (56 mi) from Candé.

== Population ==
Historical population
Year	Pop.	±% p.a.
1968	2,444	—
1975	2,664	+1.24%
1982	2,653	−0.06%
1990	2,542	−0.53%
1999	2,595	+0.23%
2007	2,761	+0.78%
2012	2,909	+1.05%
2017	2,834	−0.52%
2023	2,801	−0.20%
Source: INSEE

== See also ==
- Communes of the Maine-et-Loire department
