= Chazé-sur-Argos =

- Commune
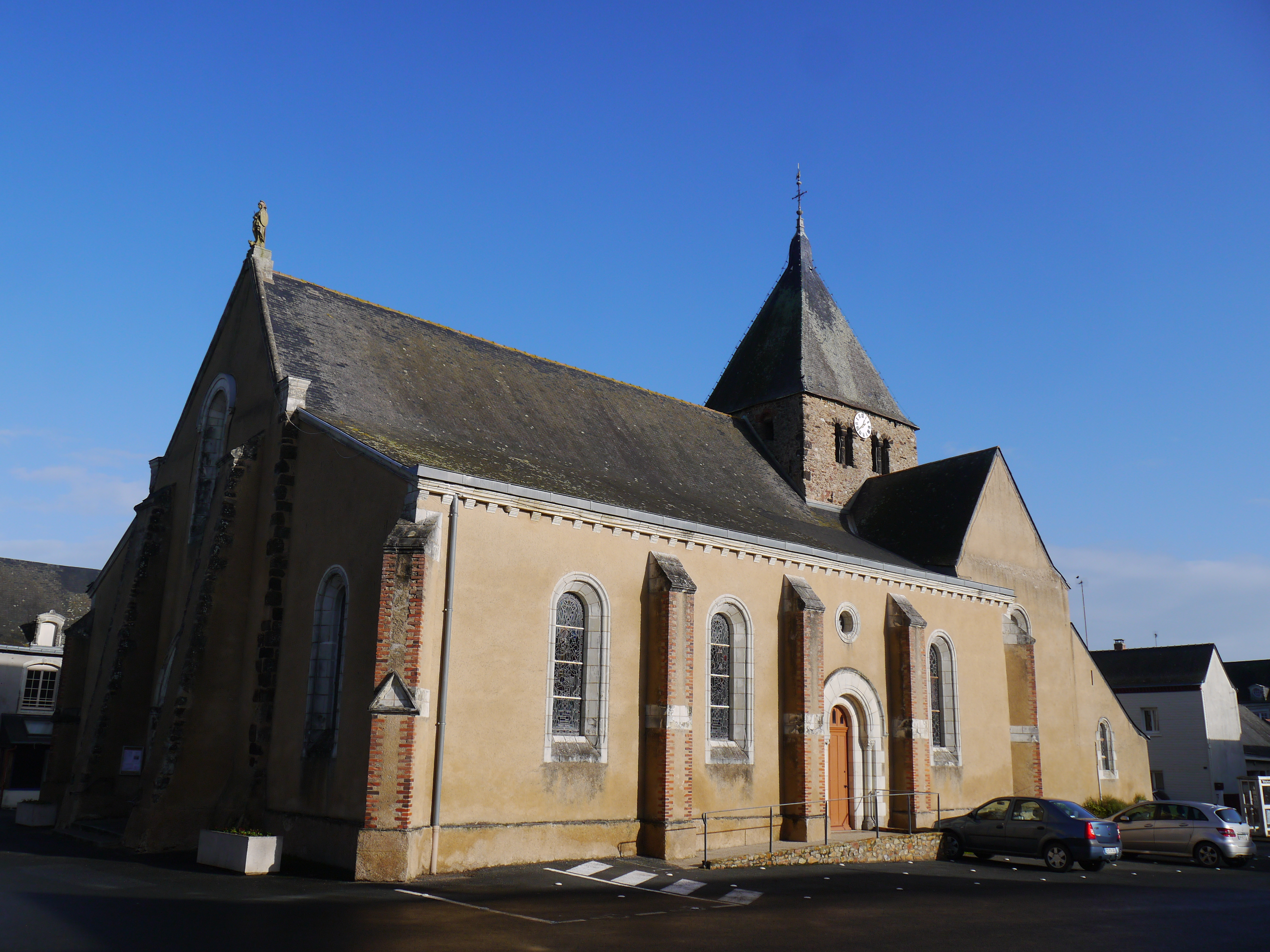
- The church in Chazé-sur-Argos
- Location of Chazé-sur-Argos
- Location within France Location within Pays de la Loire
- Coordinates: 47°37′07″N 0°53′30″W
- Country: France
- Region: Pays de la Loire
- Department: Maine-et-Loire
- Arrondissement: Segré
- Canton: Segré-en-Anjou Bleu

Government
  - Mayor (2020–2026): Françoise Coue
- Area^{1}: 30.82 km^{2} (11.90 sq mi)
- Elevation: 32 m (105 ft)
- Highest elevation: 83 m (272 ft)
- Lowest elevation: 27 m (89 ft)
- Population (2023): 1,086
  - Density: 35.24/km^{2} (91.26/sq mi)
- Demonym(s): Chazéen, Chazéenne
- Time zone: UTC+01:00 (CET)
  - Summer (DST): UTC+02:00 (CEST)
- INSEE/Postal code: 49089 /49500
- ^{1} French Land Register data, which excludes lakes, ponds, glaciers > 1 km^{2} (0.386 sq mi or 247 acres) and river estuaries.

Chazé-sur-Argos (French pronunciation: [ʃaze syʁ aʁɡos]) is a commune in the Maine-et-Loire department of western France.

== See also ==
- Communes of the Maine-et-Loire department
