= Loiré =

Commune in Maine-et-Loire, France

- Commune
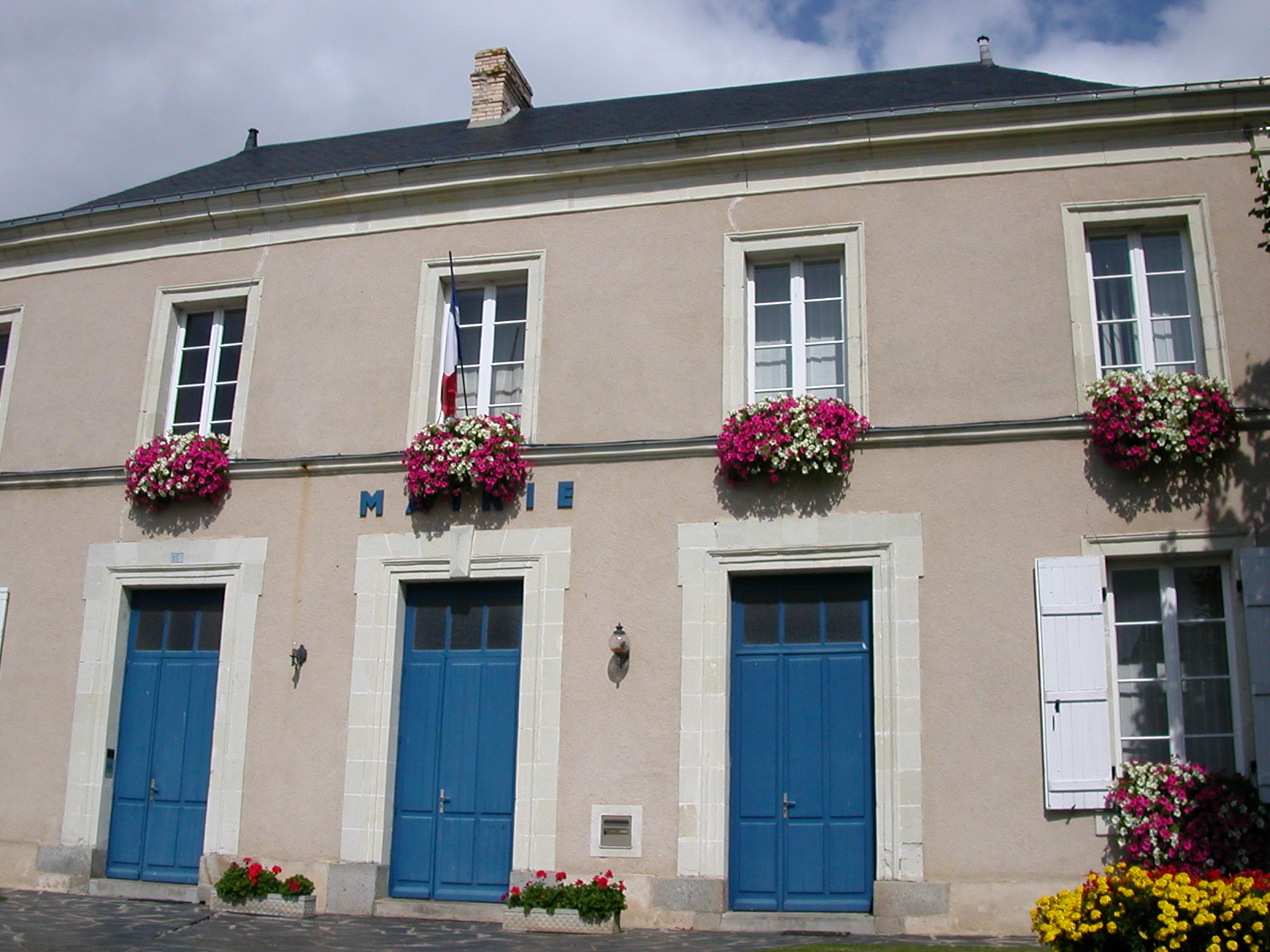
- The town hall in Loiré
- Location of Loiré
- Location within France Location within Pays de la Loire
- Coordinates: 47°36′55″N 0°58′43″W
- Country: France
- Region: Pays de la Loire
- Department: Maine-et-Loire
- Arrondissement: Segré
- Canton: Segré-en-Anjou Bleu

Government
  - Mayor (2020–2026): Jacques Robert
- Area^{1}: 33.73 km^{2} (13.02 sq mi)
- Elevation: 43 m (141 ft)
- Highest elevation: 90 m (300 ft)
- Lowest elevation: 32 m (105 ft)
- Population (2023): 900
  - Density: 27/km^{2} (69/sq mi)
- Demonym(s): Loiréen, Loiréenne
- Time zone: UTC+01:00 (CET)
  - Summer (DST): UTC+02:00 (CEST)
- INSEE/Postal code: 49178 /49440
- ^{1} French Land Register data, which excludes lakes, ponds, glaciers > 1 km^{2} (0.386 sq mi or 247 acres) and river estuaries.

Loiré (French pronunciation: [lwaʁe]) is a commune in the Maine-et-Loire department in western France.

== See also ==
- Communes of the Maine-et-Loire department
