= Champtocé-sur-Loire =

- Commune
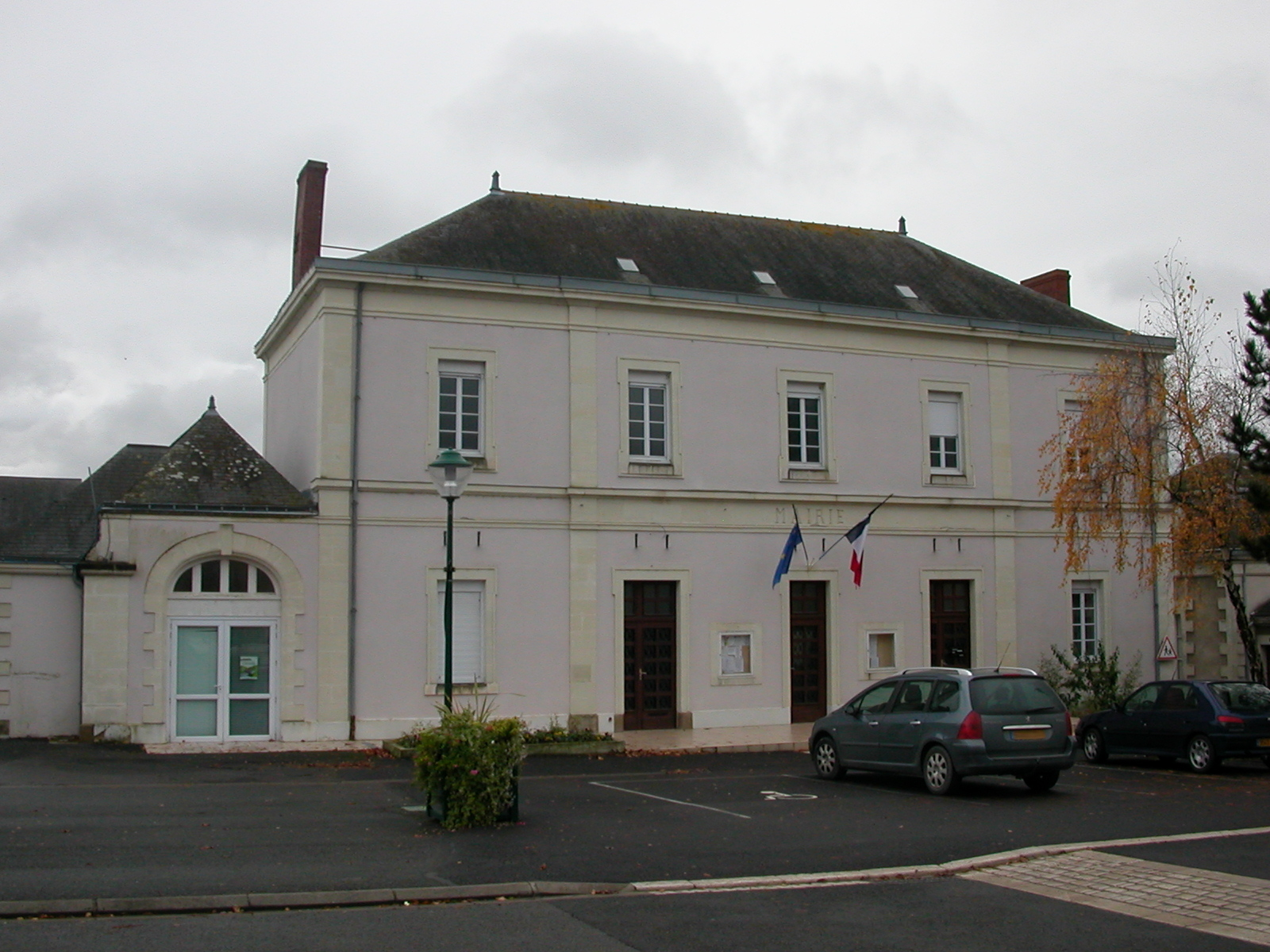
- La mairie
- Location of Champtocé-sur-Loire
- Location within France Location within Pays de la Loire
- Coordinates: 47°24′45″N 0°51′43″W
- Country: France
- Region: Pays de la Loire
- Department: Maine-et-Loire
- Arrondissement: Angers
- Canton: Chalonnes-sur-Loire
- Intercommunality: Loire Layon Aubance

Government
  - Mayor (2020–2026): Valérie Lévêque
- Area^{1}: 36.76 km^{2} (14.19 sq mi)
- Elevation: 73 m (240 ft)
- Highest elevation: 83 m (272 ft)
- Lowest elevation: 11 m (36 ft)
- Population (2023): 1,829
  - Density: 49.76/km^{2} (128.9/sq mi)
- Demonym(s): Champtocéen, Champtocéenne
- Time zone: UTC+01:00 (CET)
  - Summer (DST): UTC+02:00 (CEST)
- INSEE/Postal code: 49068 /49123
- Website: www.champtoce.fr
- ^{1} French Land Register data, which excludes lakes, ponds, glaciers > 1 km^{2} (0.386 sq mi or 247 acres) and river estuaries.

Champtocé-sur-Loire (French pronunciation: [ʃɑ̃tɔse syʁ lwaʁ], literally Champtocé on Loire) is a commune in the Maine-et-Loire department of western France. Its castle gained notoriety as a scene of some of the crimes of the medieval child murderer Gilles de Rais.

== See also ==
- Communes of the Maine-et-Loire department
