= Canton of Segré-en-Anjou Bleu =

Coordinates: 47.69°N 0.87°W

The canton of Segré-en-Anjou Bleu (before March 2020: canton of Segré) is an administrative division of the Maine-et-Loire department, in western France. Its borders were modified at the French canton reorganisation which came into effect in March 2015. Its seat is in Segré-en-Anjou Bleu.

It consists of the following communes:

1. Angrie
2. Armaillé
3. Bouillé-Ménard
4. Bourg-l'Évêque
5. Candé
6. Carbay
7. Challain-la-Potherie
8. Chazé-sur-Argos
9. Loiré
10. Ombrée d'Anjou
11. Segré-en-Anjou Bleu
