= Arrondissement of Segré =

Coordinates: 47.68°N 0.87°W

Segré
- Arrondissement
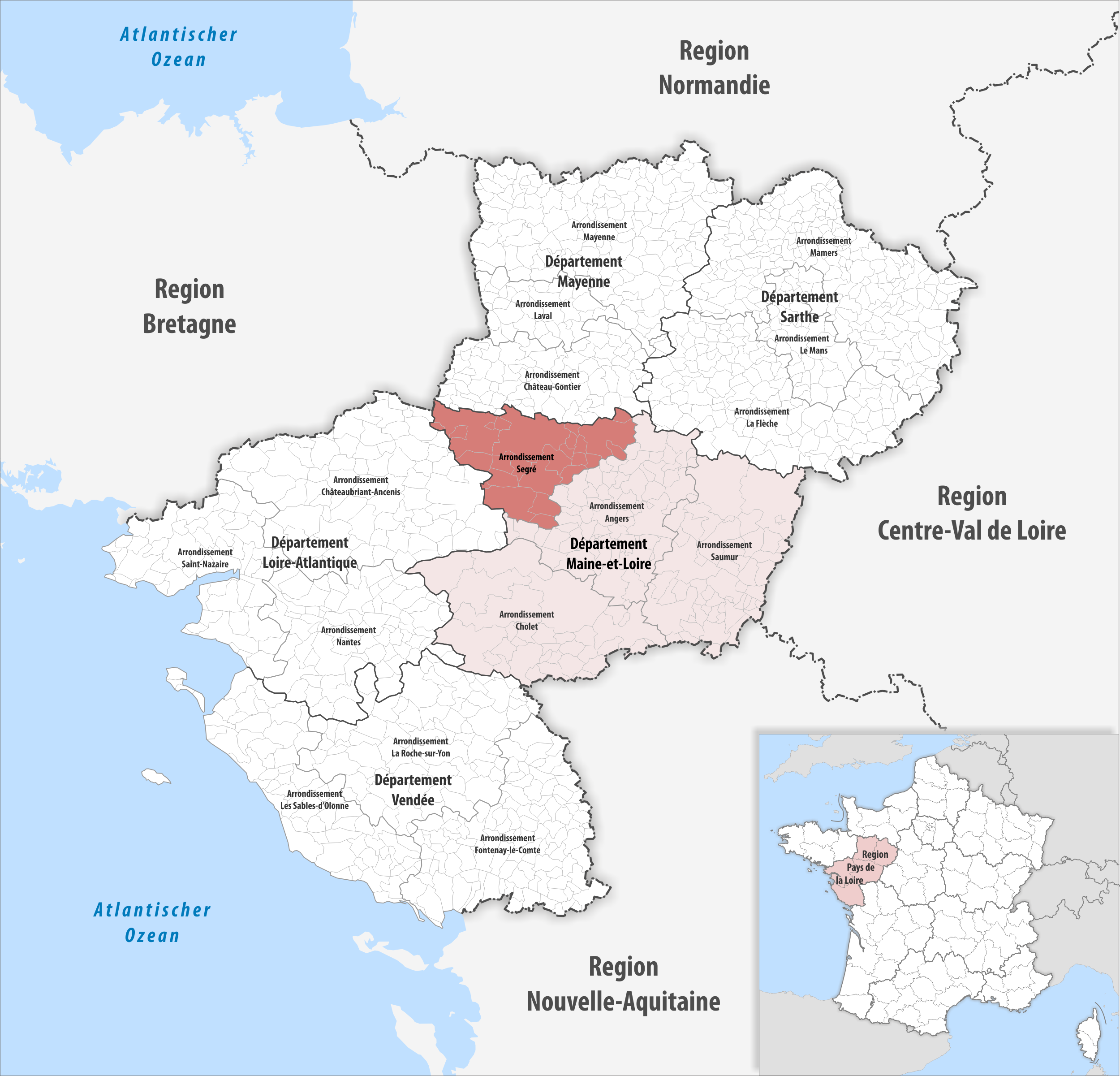
- Location within the region Pays de la Loire
- Country: France
- Region: Pays de la Loire
- Department: Maine-et-Loire
- No. of communes: {{{nbcomm}}}
- Area: 1,283.0 km^{2} (495.4 sq mi)
- Population (2023): 71,236
  - Density: 55.523/km^{2} (143.80/sq mi)
- INSEE code: 494

The arrondissement of Segré is an arrondissement of France in the Maine-et-Loire department in the Pays de la Loire region. It has 26 communes. Its population is 70,921 (2021), and its area is 1,283.0 km^{2} (495.4 sq mi).

== Composition ==
The communes of the arrondissement of Segré, and their INSEE codes, are:

1. Angrie (49008)
2. Armaillé (49010)
3. Bécon-les-Granits (49026)
4. Bouillé-Ménard (49036)
5. Bourg-l'Évêque (49038)
6. Candé (49054)
7. Carbay (49056)
8. Challain-la-Potherie (49061)
9. Chambellay (49064)
10. Chazé-sur-Argos (49089)
11. Chenillé-Champteussé (49067)
12. Erdre-en-Anjou (49367)
13. Grez-Neuville (49155)
14. Les Hauts-d'Anjou (49080)
15. La Jaille-Yvon (49161)
16. Juvardeil (49170)
17. Le Lion-d'Angers (49176)
18. Loiré (49178)
19. Miré (49205)
20. Montreuil-sur-Maine (49217)
21. Ombrée d'Anjou (49248)
22. Saint-Augustin-des-Bois (49266)
23. Sceaux-d'Anjou (49330)
24. Segré-en-Anjou Bleu (49331)
25. Thorigné-d'Anjou (49344)
26. Val d'Erdre-Auxence (49183)

== History ==
The arrondissement of Segré was created in 1800. At the January 2017 reorganisation of the arrondissements of Maine-et-Loire, it gained four communes from the arrondissement of Angers.

As a result of the reorganisation of the cantons of France which came into effect in 2015, the borders of the cantons are no longer related to the borders of the arrondissements. The cantons of the arrondissement of Segré were, as of January 2015:

1. Candé
2. Châteauneuf-sur-Sarthe
3. Le Lion-d'Angers
4. Pouancé
5. Segré
