= Canton of Chalonnes-sur-Loire =

Coordinates: 47.35°N 0.76°W

The canton of Chalonnes-sur-Loire is an administrative division of the Maine-et-Loire department, in western France. Its borders were modified at the French canton reorganisation which came into effect in March 2015. Its seat is in Chalonnes-sur-Loire.

It consists of the following communes:

1. Bécon-les-Granits
2. Chalonnes-sur-Loire
3. Champtocé-sur-Loire
4. Chaudefonds-sur-Layon
5. Denée
6. Erdre-en-Anjou (partly)
7. Ingrandes-Le Fresne sur Loire
8. La Possonnière
9. Rochefort-sur-Loire
10. Saint-Augustin-des-Bois
11. Saint-Georges-sur-Loire
12. Saint-Germain-des-Prés
13. Val d'Erdre-Auxence
