= Primaudière Priory =

Gothic priory in Pays de la Loire, France

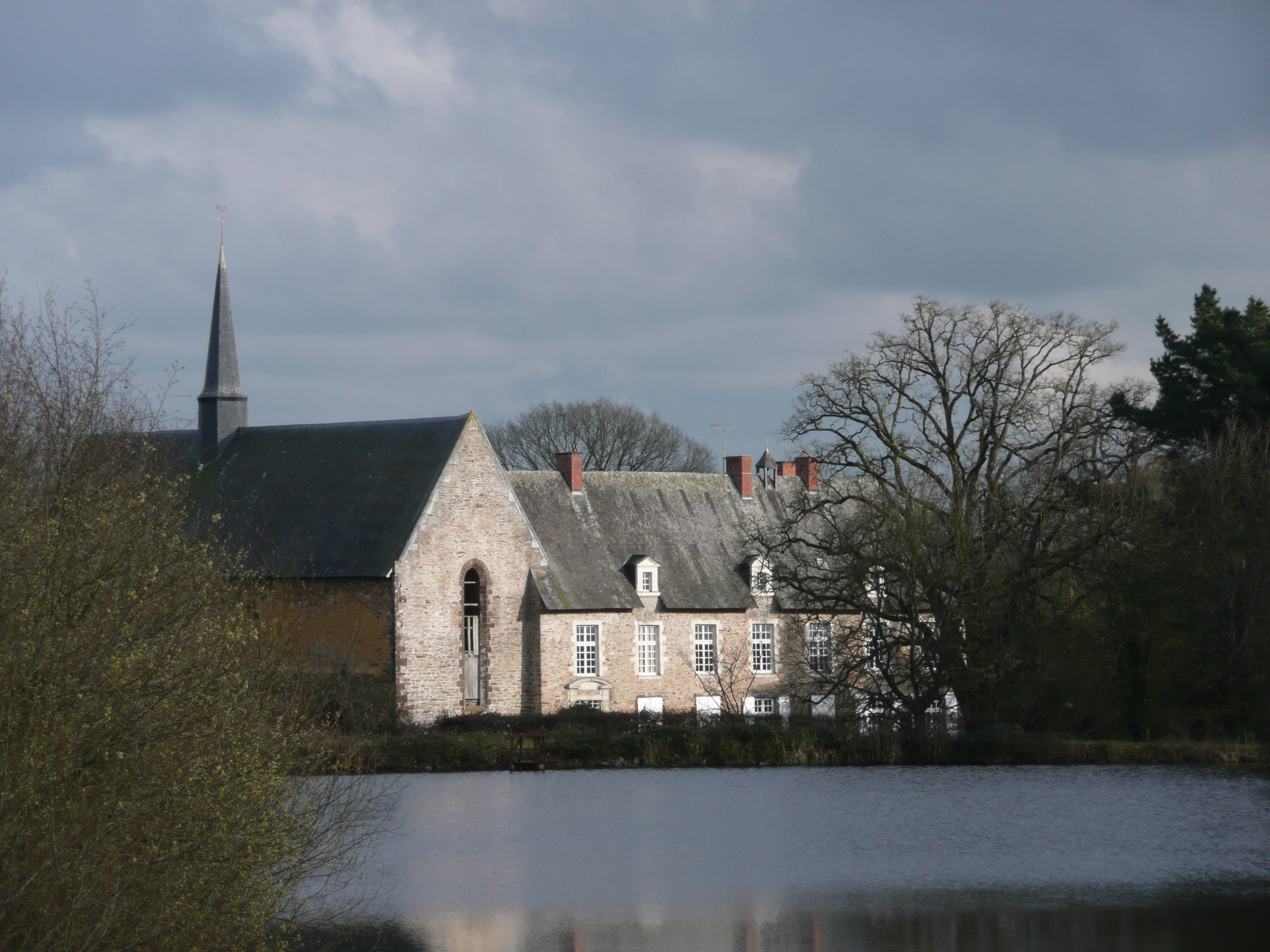
- View of Primaudière Priory, chapel and convent buildings.
- Interactive map of Primaudière Priory

General information
- Type: Priory
- Architectural style: Gothic
- Location: Armaillé and Juigné-des-Moutiers communes, Maine-et-Loire and Loire-Atlantique departments, Pays de la Loire region., France
- Coordinates: 47°41′47″N 01°10′49″W
- Year built: Early 13th century to late 18th century
- Owner: Grandmontines, Catholic church
- Awards and prizes: Monument historique (1965, chapel) Monument historique (2006, convent wing and cloister floor)

Primaudière Priory is an ancient priory dating from the 13th and 18th centuries, located in the French communes of Armaillé in Maine-et-Loire and Juigné-des-Moutiers in Loire-Atlantique (Pays de la Loire region).

It was founded by monks of the Grandmont order in 1207, with the help and support of local lords. It was abandoned by the last monks in 1762. The main building is the Primaudière Chapel, built in the 13th century and a place of pilgrimage in the Middle Ages. The organization of the priory is typical of Grandmont architecture, particularly in terms of the openings in the chapel and its two doors, one for the faithful and the second for the monks serving it.

== Location ==
The priory was built above the river Nymphe. This watercourse once separated the ancient provinces of Anjou and Bretagne. Today, it divides the departments of Maine-et-Loire and Loire-Atlantique. As a result, the monument is situated astride the two departments, in both the Armaillé and Juigné-des-Moutiers communes. The monument is surrounded by the Juigné forest and the Bois de la Fonte.

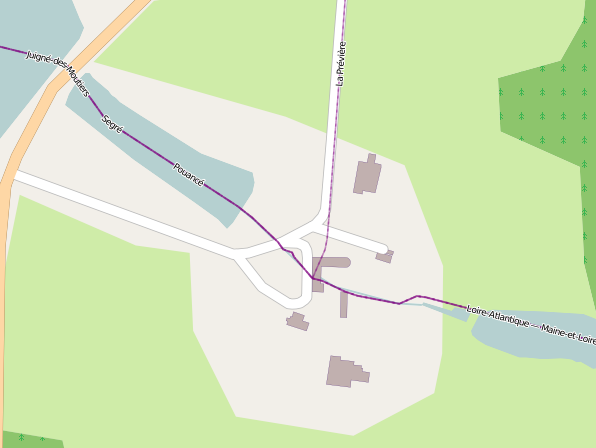
Plan view of the buildings.

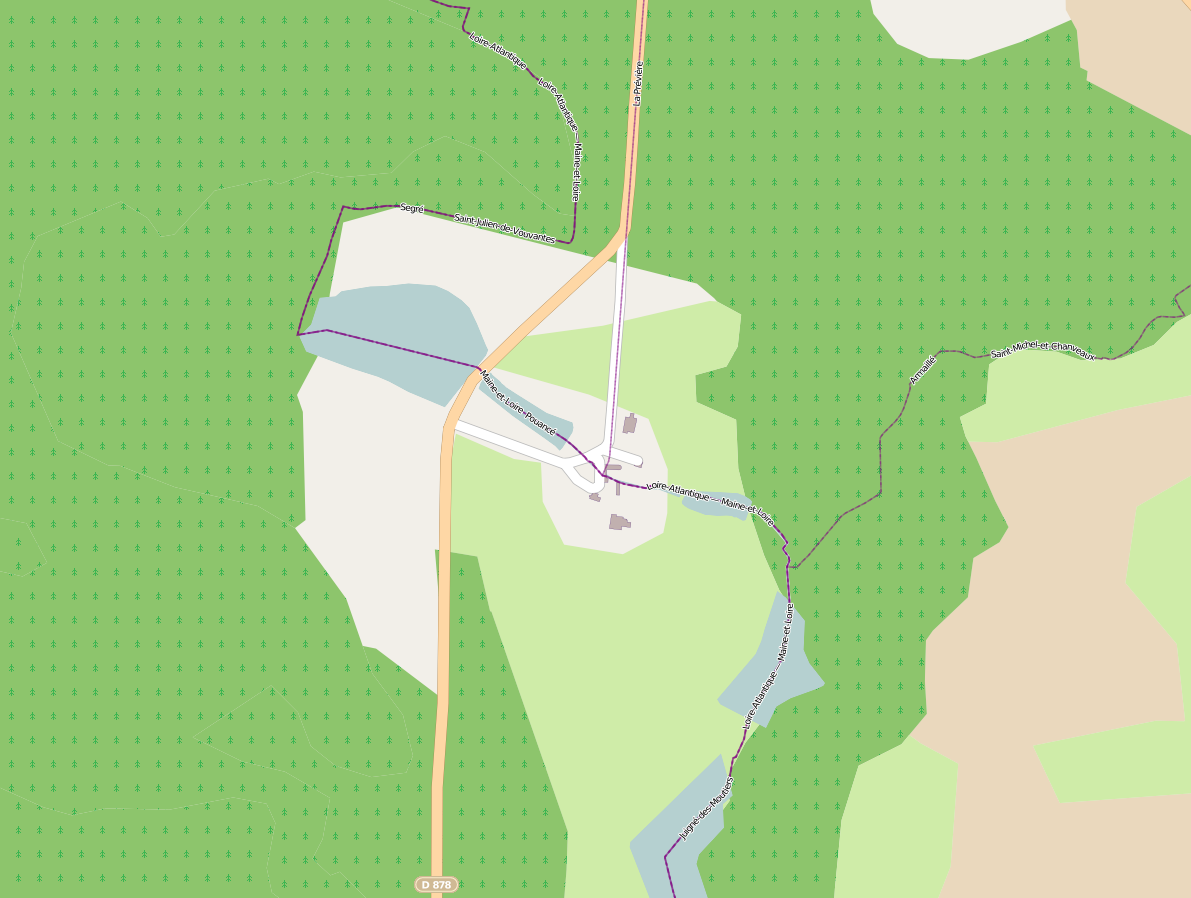
Map of the immediate surroundings.

== Toponymy ==
The place was mentioned as Primauderia around 1095 in the Saint-Jouin cartulary. The same designation appears in the Grandmont cartulary in 1208. The current name, Primaudière, appears in 1544 in a notarized deed, a farm lease from Maistre Jehan Dumas, his prior commendataire. The name is said to derive from a Latin man's name, Primaldus, a possible owner of the property.

== History ==
=== From medieval to modern times ===
The estate belonged to Jean Le Veneur, who gave it to the Abbey of Saint-Sauveur, Redon between 1061 and 1075, probably through the influence of the lord of Châteaubriant. Around 1095, it fell into the hands of Gauthier Hai, lord of Pouancé, who seized it "at the cost of his lance and the blood of his own and others". He also seized the estate's tithe, provoking the wrath of the monks.

While the region belonged to the Duchy of Brittany, Juigné-des-Moutiers was first mentioned in 1123, when its church was donated to Brice, Bishop of Nantes. At the time, two priories coexisted in the territory of the present-day commune. The first, Les Moutiers, was located in the village; the second, La Primaudière, was two kilometers to the north.

Around March 1207 or 1208, Guillaume de la Guerche, lord of Pouancé, Geoffroy, lord of Châteaubriant, and Hervé de La Selle, lord of La Prévière, met and signed a charter. This granted the Primaudière estate, its woods, and lands, to the monks of the Grandmont order. Geoffroy agreed to grant them 10 livres of rent on the tolls of Châteaubriant and the privileges of a burgher in the town, while Guillaume de La Guerche agreed to grant 25 pounds of rent on the farms of Pouancé, and the privileges of a bourgeois in each of the towns of his seigneury, Pouancé, Segré, Martigné, and La Guerche.

The monks of Grandmont then built a priory and a chapel dedicated to Notre Dame, which became a place of pilgrimage and procession on Madeleine Day. The priory was built above the Nymphe, the river separating Anjou from Brittany. The Notre Dame chapel, along with part of the priory, was located on Anjou land, while the other part of the priory was on Breton territory. In 1295, the priory was inhabited by five monks, rising to six in the 14th century. In the 14th century, Grandmont monks from Monnay and Bercey took refuge here. Around 1317, the priory was united with that of Montguyon. The Grandmont order was dissolved in 1772, and the revenues were transferred to the Saint-Charles Seminary in Angers. The priory's two tenant farms were responsible for providing the royal staff with oxen and charettes, particularly for transporting galley slaves.

=== Contemporary period ===
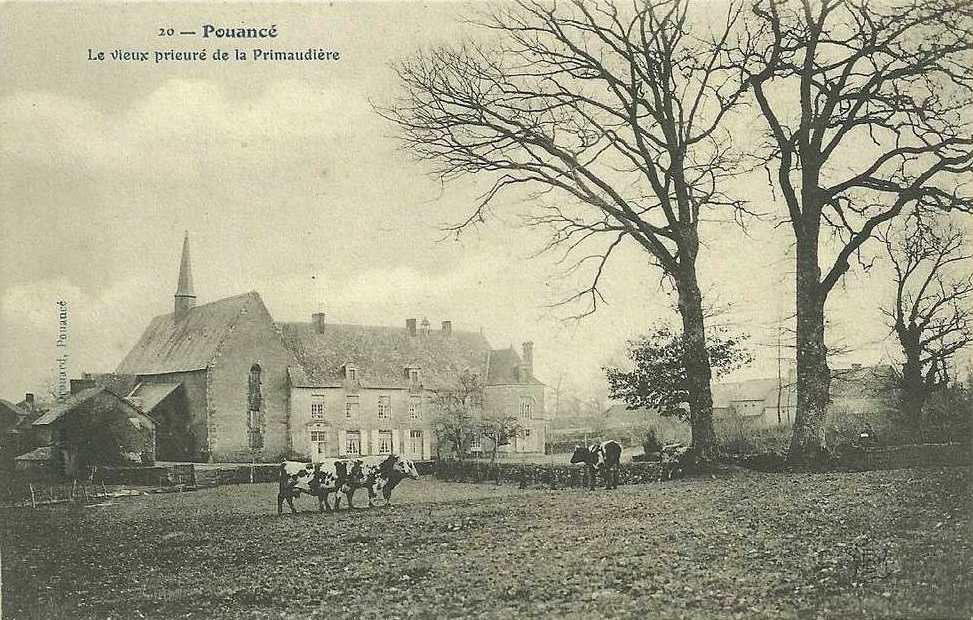
View of the priory circa 1900.

The priory was sold as national property during the French Revolution. Its owner transformed it into a glassworks in 1836. The business only lasted around twenty years. The chapel was then transformed into a stable until the second half of the 20th century. Partitions and floors were installed in the chapel's nave, and its north façade was flanked by a building. Subsequently, the owners carried out clearing and restoration work, recovering the altar table. The building was cleaned up and cleared of later constructions. The 15th- and 18th-century lodgings were also restored.

The priory chapel has been listed as a historic monument since May 31, 1965. The entire convent wing (facades and roofs), as well as the former cloister square for its archaeological interest, have been listed as historic monuments since September 30, 2005.

=== Architecture ===
The Primaudière Priory is characteristic of Grandmontain architecture, and is therefore similar to the two other Grandmontain priories in Anjou, at Breuil-Bellay and La Haie-aux-Bonshommes. The chapel, with its single nave and choir, is oriented from west to east. It has two entrances: to the north, the congregation's door, and to the south, the monks' door. The latter opens onto a courtyard surrounded by a cloister serving the priory's various rooms: chapter house, guest room, refectory, kitchen, and cellar. The dormitories were located upstairs.

At the Primaudière, only the chapel has been completely preserved. Dating from the 13th century, it consists of a forty-meter-long vessel that terminates in the choir, abundantly lit by the three large openings in the chevet. On the west gable, a single opening illuminates the nave. The nave is vaulted over the entire length with a pointed barrel vault. The chancel, 40 cm wider than the nave, is vaulted with a ten-point ribbed groin vault, whose prominent ribs fall onto capitals supported by columns. A liturgical cupboard is dug into the choir to the north, and a double sink to the south. Some of the walls are still plastered, decorated with a scattering of flowers and consecration crosses.

The church door is the most elaborate, with two ogival archivolts separated by round moldings resting on columns with capitals. This door is entirely crafted in Roussard sandstone, a brown to red sandstone that also adorns all the noble parts of the chapel (west window, chevet buttresses, liturgical cabinet and sink, altar).

The remaining convent buildings bear few traces of the 15th century (including a blue sandstone bay on the south gable). They were completely rebuilt in the 18th century. The façade is topped by a hipped roof, and the main door by a curved pediment. A dormer window is inscribed with the dates 1715 and 1887. The convent buildings were restored in the 20th century.

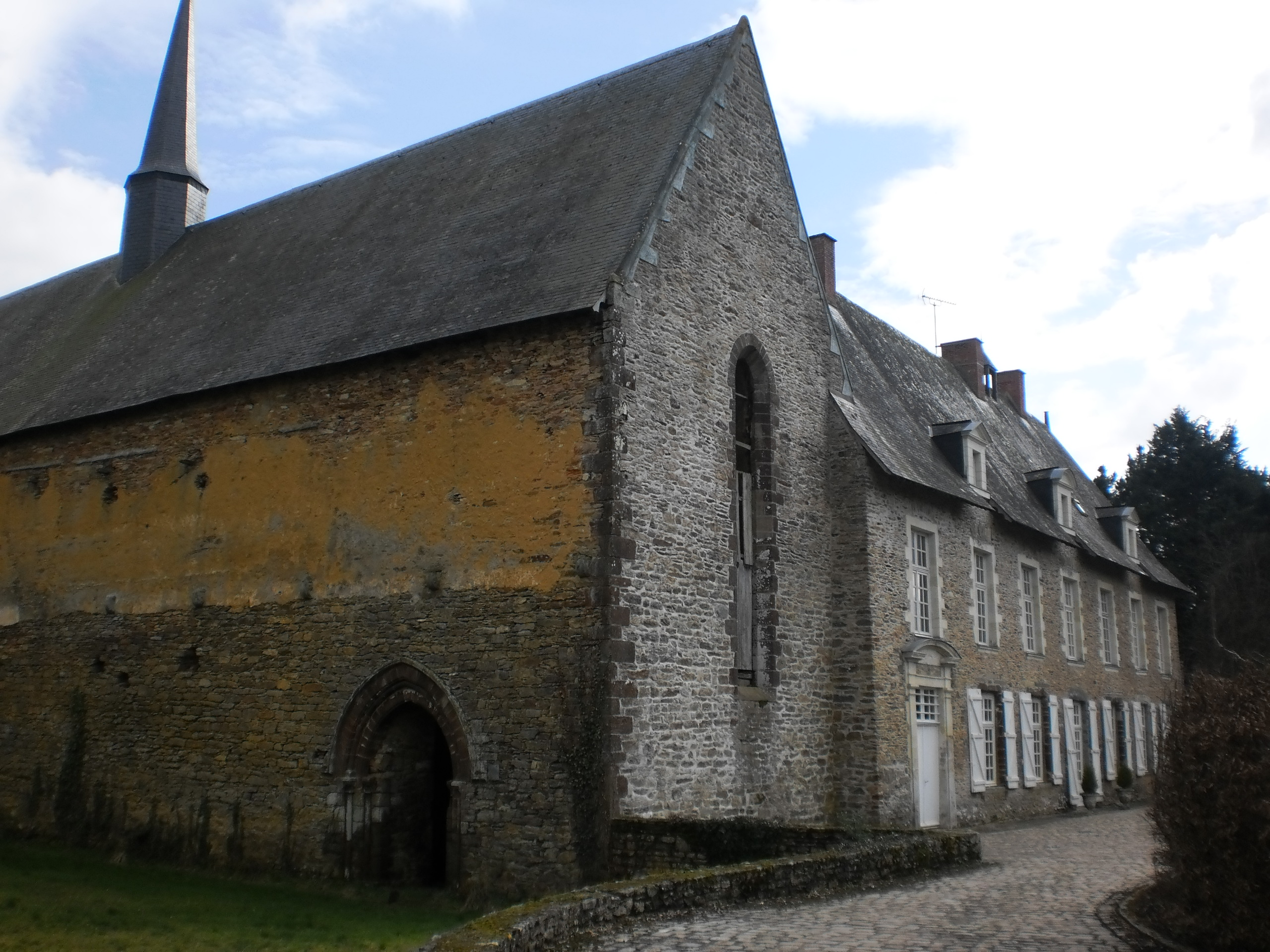
West view of the current priory buildings.

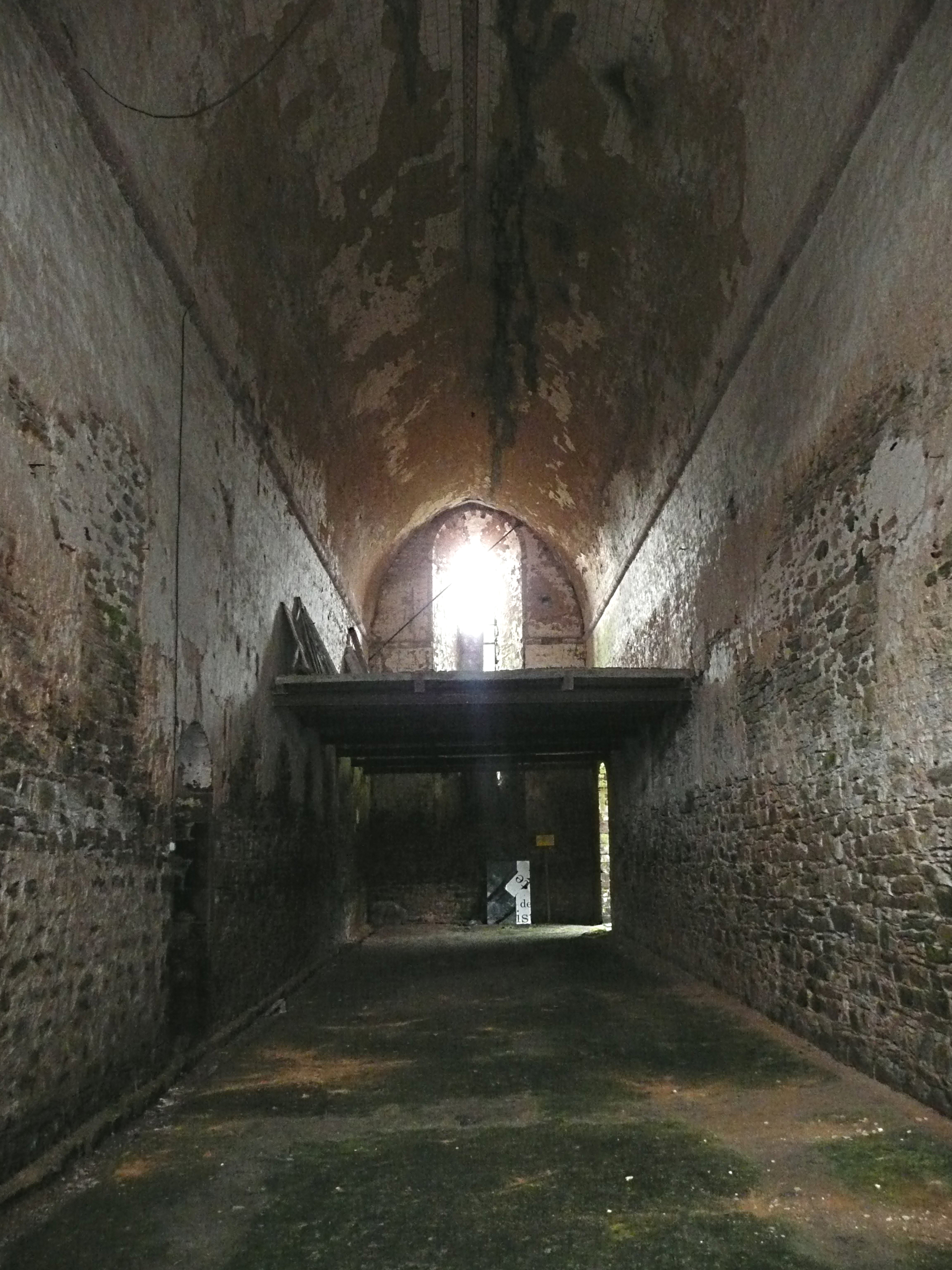
View of the nave and west opening.

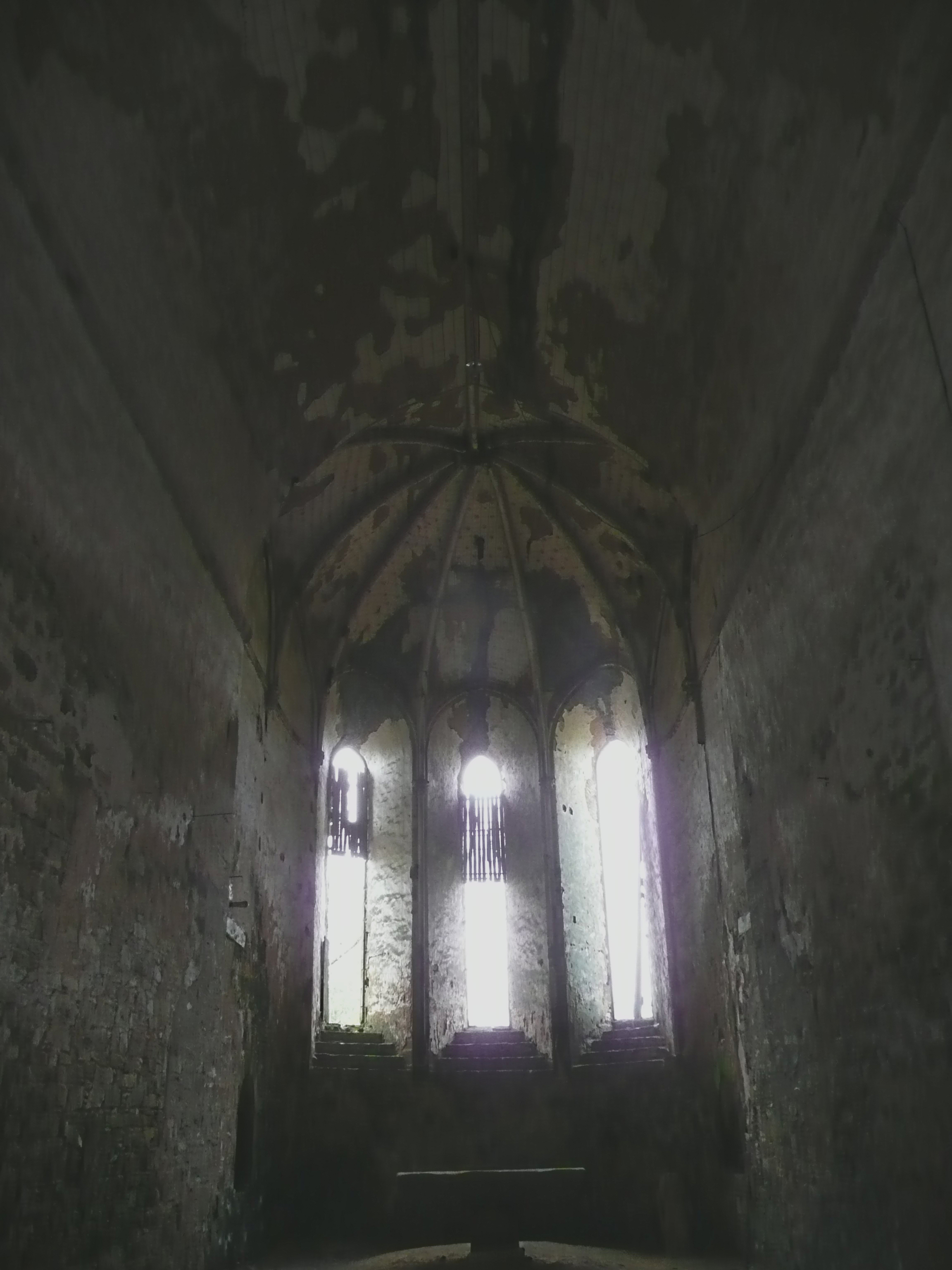
View of the chapel's choir.

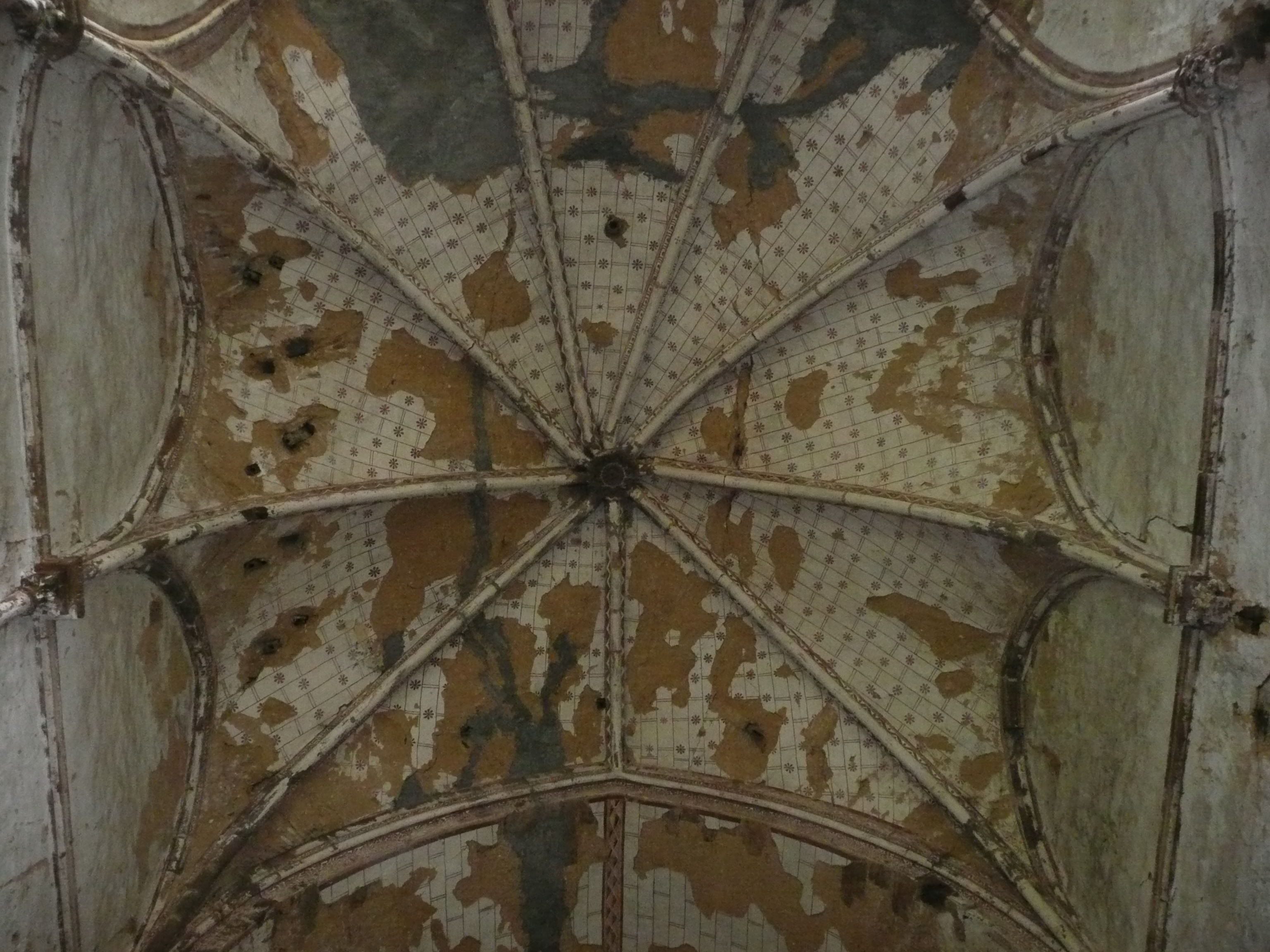
View of the chapel's choir vault.

== See also ==
- fr:Liste des monuments historiques de Maine-et-Loire (nord)
