= Pouancé Castle =

Medieval castle in northwest France

Medieval castle of Pouancé
- Château médiéval de Pouancé
- Pouancé, Maine-et-Loire.
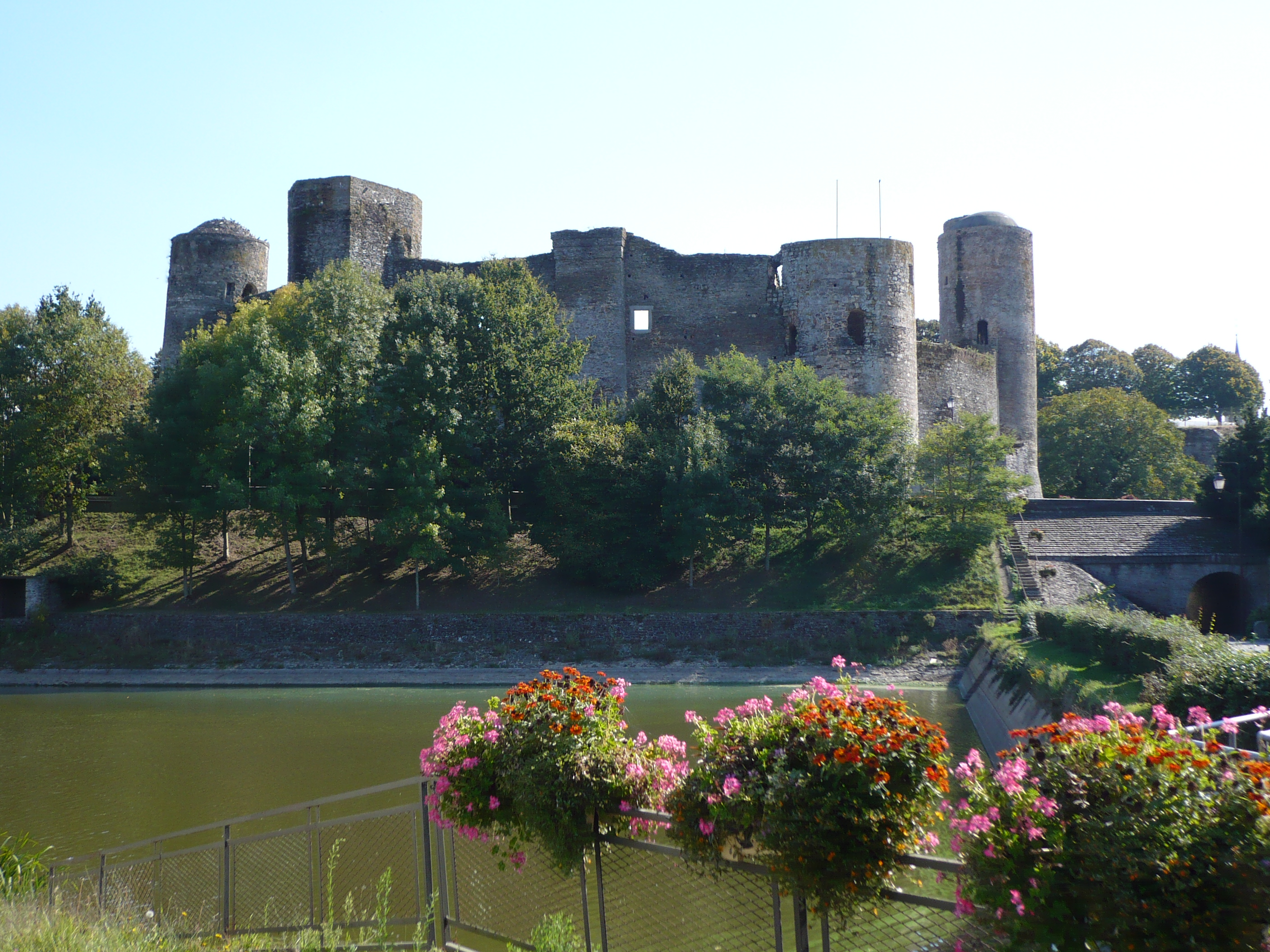
- The castle, viewed from the west

Site information
- Type: Castle
- Owner: Town of Pouancé
- Open to the public: Yes
- Condition: ruined

Location
- Coordinates: 47.7413888889°N 1.175°W

Site history
- Built: end of the 12th century
- In use: end of the 12th – end of the 16th century
- Materials: shale, granite.
- Battles/wars: Siege of Pouancé (1432) (fr); Breton War (fr)

Garrison information
- Occupants: Jean II, Duke of Alençon

The medieval castle of Pouancé is located in Pouancé, Maine-et-Loire, France, at the western border of the old province of Anjou, where it was built as a defence against Brittany. Along with the remains of the city walls, it covers a surface of three hectares. It is nicknamed the "second castle of Anjou" because of its size, which is just less than that of the castle of Angers. It belongs to the Breton march, facing the Breton castle of Châteaubriant.

Situated in a location which was fortified in the 11th century, the castle was built between the 12th and 15th centuries. Besieged several times during the Hundred Years' War, it became a strategic fortress at the end of the 15th century, during the Mad War. Ruined during the 16th century and completely abandoned since the 18th, it was saved from destruction when Louis Bessière, an inhabitant of Pouancé, decided to restore the building in the 1960s. The castle is now owned by the town of Pouancé and is open to visitors during the summer months.

The castle has been listed as a monument historique since 7 July 1926. Despite volunteers and amateur excavations over 40 years, little is known about the structure of the castle, due to a lack of deep archaeological surveys.

== History ==
=== Early history ===
At the end of the Early Middle Ages, the town of Pouancé, at the boundaries of the Breton march and the province of Anjou, was most likely fortified to oppose the Breton castle at Châteaubriant. The first mention of the castle dates back to 1049–1060, inside the cartulary of Carbay, which recounts the count of Anjou maintained troops and a vicarius named Landri or Landry. Fragments of Merovingian sarcophagus were found in the walls of the nearby church at Saint-Aubin, proving the existence of a human settlement in Pouancé before the construction of the castle.

After the death of Landri, the castle was given by the count of Anjou to a close relation of Landri, Hervé de Martigné, vassal of the count of Rennes. Hervé already possessed the deed to Lourzais, a territory close to Pouancé. In 1066, the Duke of Brittany, Conan II took the castle, possibly with the help of Hervé. Following Hervé's death, around 1084, his son Gautier Hay succeed him. Emma, Gautier's heir, married Guillaume Ist of La Guerche in around 1130, uniting the seigneury of Pouancé-Martigné with La Guerche.

The lords of Pouancé then entered a rebellion against the Plantagenet. Geoffroy Ist, the grandson of Emma, took part in the revolt of 1173–74 with other Breton lords against Henry Plantagenet. They were defeated, and their castles destroyed. Geoffroy's son revolted against the Count of Anjou with Breton lords in 1196, and defeated the army of the seneschal of Anjou. At the beginning of the 13th century, the castle was the center of a vast seigneury located in Anjou and Brittany, consisting of the seigneuries of Pouancé, Martigné, La Guerche and Segré. It was around this time that the actual castle was erected, with the first towers and ramparts. Guillaume III, lord of Pouancé, established a levee on the Verzée river, thus forming a lake alongside the castle, protecting the western front of the fortification, the side that faced Brittany.

The 13th century saw the beginning of the decline of the Pouancé family. Geoffroy II, the son of Guillaume III, died around 1244. His own son, Geoffroy III, died in 1263, leaving his daughter Jeanne the only heir. She married Jean of Beaumont. Their grandson, Jean II of Beaumont, failed to produce an heir with his first wife Isabeau of Harcourt, and subsequently married Marguerite of Poitiers. Louis of Beaumont, their only son, died in 1364 during the battle of Cocherel. Marie Chamaillard, the granddaughter of Isabeau (the first wife of Jean II) regained the seigneury of Pouancé, adding it to the fiefs already owned by her husband, Pierre II of Alençon.

=== The Hundred Years' War ===
Between 1371 and 1379, Pierre II built the Main Tower and the machicolation on the castle. Some towers were altered by adding spiral staircases, notably in the Saint-Antoine tower. Between the 14th and 15th centuries, the main keep and the ice-house were built.

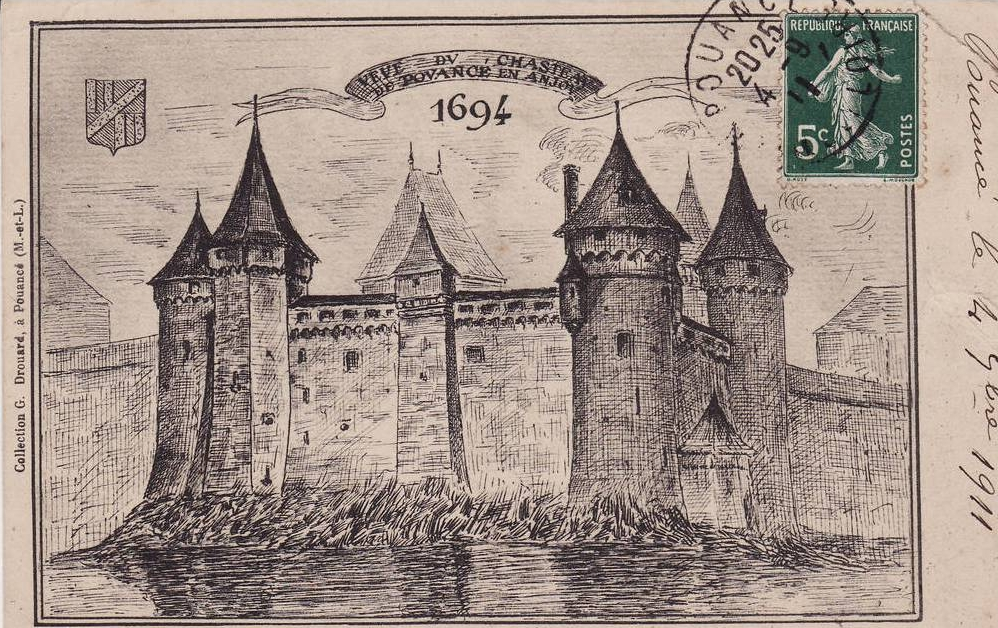
A 19th century reproduction of the castle of Pouancé.

The castle was attacked by a Breton army led by John V, Duke of Brittany in 1379. The castle may have been taken by betrayal. Pierre II then exchanged the seigneury with Bertrand du Guesclin for lands in Normandy. John V gave the fortress back to Bertrand's brother Olivier du Guesclin in 1381. Olivier sold back Pouancé to John V in 1389. When John V married his daughter Marie to Jean I, Duke of Alençon, Jean I was given the seigneury of Pouancé as her dowry.

The son of Jean I, Jean II of Alençon, was captured by the English during the battle of Verneuil. After his release, financially ruined by the ransom, he decided to put pressure on his uncle John VI, Duke of Brittany to pay the remaining part of his mother's dowry. He kidnapped Jean of Malestroit, Bishop of Nantes and Chancellor of Brittany, to force the Duke of Brittany to pay. Refusing to be blackmailed, John VI gathered his army and launched a siege of the castle on January 6, 1432. The castle of Pouancé was besieged for 5 weeks by 6000 men of the Duke's army and his English allies, and bombed by 7 cannons. After 5 weeks under siege, despite the ongoing resistance of the castle, Jean II decided to negotiate and the siege was lifted on February 19.

Eleven years after this siege, in 1443, an English army, led by John Beaufort, 1st Duke of Somerset, besieged the castle. Despite a warning from Arthur III of Brittany, Jean II of Alençon counter-attacked with his men without waiting for reinforcements. His army was surprised by the English at night, and the counter-attack failed. The castle and the town managed to resist the 7000 men strong army of the English who lifted the siege after two or three weeks, leaving the faubourgs of the town destroyed.

=== The Breton War ===
In 1467, Jean II of Alençon plotted with Francis II, Duke of Brittany against King Louis XI. The Breton army attacked in October 1467 and besieged the castle, which was defended by Sir de Villier in the name of the King of France, without Jean's consent. After three days, the castle was taken and the Breton army looted and sacked the town, burning the town and the castle.

In July 1468, a French counter-attack drive the Breton out of Pouancé. Following this, the Angevin fortress became an essential part of the French system of defense and attack against Brittany. In 1472, Louis XI spent time in the fortress with more than 5,000 men when he learn Breton troops were gathering in La Guerche. In 1488, Louis II de la Trémoille assembled 12,000 men in Pouancé before launching the siege of Châteaubriant, starting a military campaign against Brittany that defeated the independent duchy.

=== Wars of Religion ===
In 1562, the seigneury fell into the hands of the Cossé-Brissac family, more precisely to Charles II de Cossé, Duke of Brissac. A fervent catholic, he entered the Catholic League in 1590 and opposed the King of France Henry IV. In 1592, Madam of Brissac sent Chanjus, commander of Pouancé's castle, to pay homage to the King in Angers. Despite a desire for neutrality, the town and the castle were occupied in 1593 by 50 soldiers of Charles, Duke of Mayenne, a member of the Catholic League. He joined the King in 1596, but Philippe Emmanuel, Duke of Mercœur, Governor of Brittany, continued the combat. In September 1597, Chanjus, commander of Pouancé, handed over the castle to Mercœur who is believed to have established a garrison. He finally surrendered in March 1598, bringing an end to the eightieth war of religion in France.

=== Abandonment of the castle ===
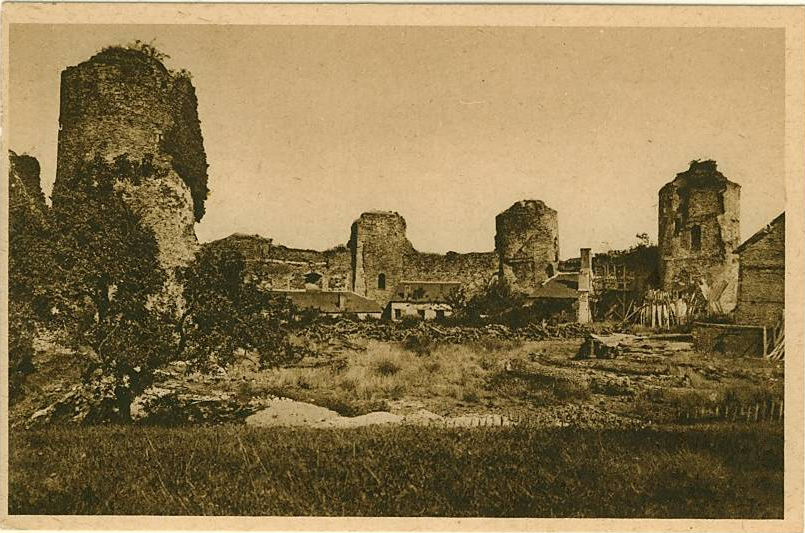
Inside of the fortress, pre-1916. Dwellings and workshops are visible along the ramparts. On the right: the Mill Tower before its collapse in 1915. On the left, the Custodial Tower, which collapsed in 1936.

For a long time, the castle lost its residential function, with only the family of Cossé-Brissac using it on rare occasions. However, François de Cossé died in the castle in 1651 and his body was buried within the grounds. During the 17th and the 18th centuries, some rooms were still inhabitable, since several people were mentioned as residing inside: a gardener in 1620, a lieutenant of bailliage died there in 1671, and an officer dwelled there between 1756 and 1767. A tax office was situated in a lower room of the castle at the beginning of the 17th century. However, many of the officers in charge of the administration of the seigneury were living outside of the walled city of Pouancé, inside their own residences. As early as 1541, the ancient ramparts were partially in disrepair and largely abandoned. During the 18th century, inhabitants of Pouancé were allowed to use the stone for their houses if they owned them.

During the second half of the 18th century, inhabitants of the town decided to partially deconstruct the gatehouse, as well as fill in the moat and build several dwellings and workshops inside the bailey, along the curtain wall, thus commencing a long period of degradation. Yet during the archaeological congress of France in 1871 in Angers, the fortress was judged to be "a beautiful feudal ruin, one of the most beautiful doubtlessly possessed by Anjou". In 1880, in a speech given during the graduation ceremony at an Angers lycée, Paul Lehugeur mentioned the castle of Pouancé: "All corners of Anjou have feudal ruins, but it is to Pouancé we look for its great fortress, with its double wall and powerful defenses".

In 1911, a Catholic private school, the Christ Child School, was built between the bastion and the northern postern. The upper part of the northern curtain wall was destroyed. In 1915, one of the towers, the Mill Tower, collapsed along with a part of the curtain wall, opening a breach into the outside walls which were formerly preserved. The castle was listed as a Monument historique in 1926. In 1929, the inspector-general of historical monuments carried out a plan of the ruins, in order to "at least preserve the memory" of the castle. After surveys showed the risk of collapse, the Marquis of Montault, owner of the castle, evacuated the remaining residents. In 1934, the Beaux-arts destroyed the now abandoned houses inside the bailey. The upper part of a second tower, the Criminal tower, collapsed in 1936. The top of the remaining towers and ramparts were restored to prevent further degradation.

== See also ==
- List of castles in France

== Bibliography ==
- Alain Racineux, À travers l’histoire, au pays de Pouancé, 1983
- Thierry Géhan, Rapport de sondage : Pouancé, le Vieux Château, DRAC, 1992
- Céline Cornet, Usages historiques et environnement mental d'un château de marches du XIe au XXe siècle. La forteresse de Pouance (Maine-et-Loire), Maîtrise d'histoire, 2000.
- André Chédeville et Daniel Pichot (dir.), Des villes à l’ombre des châteaux : Naissance et essor des agglomérations castrales en France au Moyen Âge, Presse Universitaire de Rennes, June 2010, 240 p.
- André Neau, Sur les chemins de l'histoire : En Pays Pouancéen, t. 1, November 2010, 256 p.
- René Cintré, Les Marches de Bretagne au Moyen Age, Jean-Marie Pierre, 1992 (ISBN 2-903999-11-2)
- Pierre Joseph Odolant-Desnos, Mémoires historiques sur la ville d'Alençon et sur ses seigneurs, t. 2, 1787
- Odile Halbert, L'allée de la Héé, Odile Halbert, 2000
