= Siege of Pouancé (1432) =

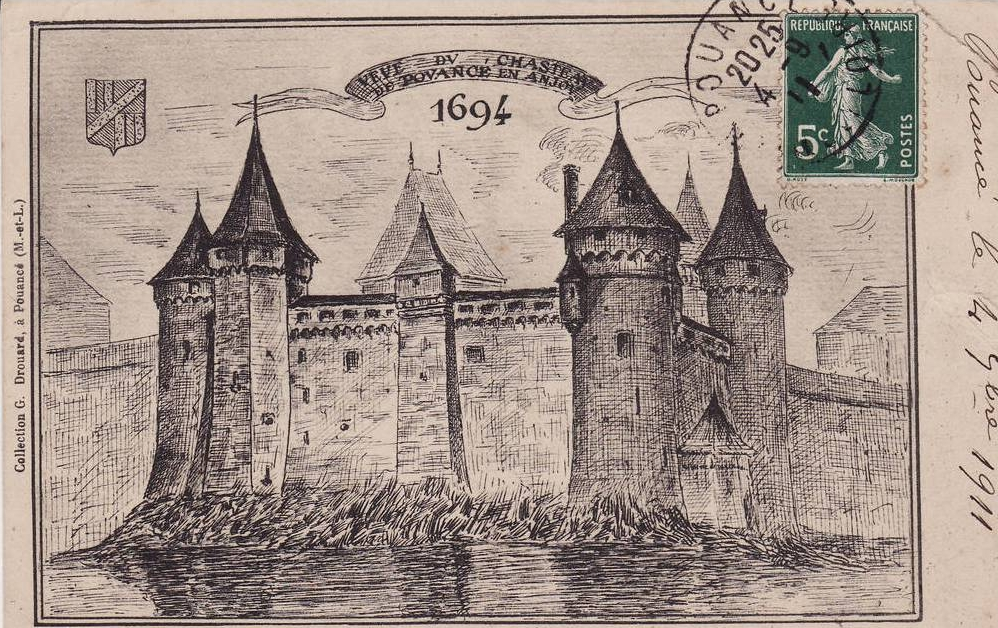
- Pouancé Castle (reproduction of an engraving of the 19th century)
Date	6 January – 22 February 1432
Location	Pouancé, Anjou, Kingdom of France 47.7414°N 1.175°W
Result	Peace agreement

Belligerents
Duchy of Brittany; Kingdom of England	Barony of Pouancé; Armagnac party

Commanders and leaders
Jean V of Brittany; Arthur de Richemont; Guy XIV of Laval; Alain IX de Rohan; Bertrand de Dinan; Thomas Scales; John Fastolf	Jean II of Alençon; Ambroise de Loré

Strength
6,000 men 7 artillery pieces	Very small number of soldiers

The siege of Pouancé (6 January – 22 February 1432) was undertaken by John V, Duke of Brittany, against his nephew John II, Duke of Alençon, as part of a conflict involving the payment of a dowry. It is at times referred to as the third siege of Pouancé, in succession to other sieges in 1066 and 1379.

Although the siege saw English and French forces fighting against each other, thus being able to set itself in the context of the Hundred Years' War, this conflict has its origins in a family dispute of financial nature.

== Origin of the conflict ==
Mary of Brittany, daughter of John IV, Duke of Brittany, had been married in 1396 to John I, Count of Alençon. But the dowry of 30,000 livres that was to come with this marriage had been paid only in part: it was this financial problem that was at the origin of the dispute between the two houses.

John II, Duke of Alençon, was born of this union in 1409, six years before his father John I was killed during the battle of Agincourt. At the age of fifteen, John II engaged himself in the fight against the English. During the battle of Verneuil (17 August 1424), he was made prisoner. He was only released in 1429 when he agreed to pay a large ransom of 200,000 crowns. To pay for it, he sold his stronghold of Fougères to the son of John IV, his uncle John V, Duke of Brittany, for 120,000 ecus, strengthening the latter's position on the Franco-Breton border. John V shortly after received a visit from his nephew John II at Nantes, on Christmas 1431. The latter, lacking money, hoped to obtain the payment of the unpaid portion of the dowry of his mother, or 15,000 livres. John V was always postponing the payment, and so John II put pressure on his uncle. It was Jean de Malestroit, bishop of Nantes and chancellor of the duke, who was the victim. John II led his hostage to the castle of La Flèche and, after the failure of the negotiations, made him come to Pouancé while waiting for the dowry to be paid.

== Unfolding of the siege ==
=== Beginning ===
Faced with the failure of the discussions, John V raised troops in Rennes and its surroundings. He gave the order to his son-in-law, Guy XIV of Laval, to besiege Pouancé, where was the Duke of Alençon, his mother and his wife, and where Jean de Malestroit was imprisoned. He went to Châteaubriant to follow the evolution of the operation more easily.

The Breton forces, half-prepared, marched towards Pouancé, in spite of the rigors of the season: "The cold was so violent that the ice carried horses and wagons." They arrived in sight of the city on the morning of the 6th of January, and commenced the attack on the west side of the fortress, that is, to say, on the side of the enclosure directed towards Brittany. The garrison of the city was defended by a small number of soldiers, insufficient to resist the Breton army. Also, the Duke of Alençon decided to leave the fortress secretly to go and take refuge in Château-Gontier to mount a counterattack. He sent one of his favorite captains, Ambroise de Loré, to La Guerche with the order to help the besieged people of Pouancé. The latter found the opportunity of bringing back by a "false door" forty good soldiers, "of whom those within were very glad."

=== Breton and English reinforcements ===
Unhappy to learn that reinforcements could have reached the castle of Pouancé, John V tightened the grip on the city. After having sent men-at-arms to ask the assistance of his English allies, he obtained the support of English companies stationed in Maine and Lower Normandy, to reinforce his army:

- George Riguemen, English squire stationed at Vannes, with 240 horses;
- John Fastolf, with 100 spears and 160 archers;
- Baron d'Ulby, English captain, with 300 spears and 1,000 archers;
- the bastard of Salisbury and Jean Herpelay, with "large number of people";
- Richard Holland, Thomas Allouin and Robin Geneson, squires of the garrison of Avranches, "with some people";
- Baron de Scales.

With these companies reinforcing his army, John V was also given four small copper guns and a large iron one with twenty-four iron balls for the latter one.

At the same time, the Duke of Brittany sent orders to Trégor and Léon to advance troops from Lower Brittany: "The Lower Bretons came in large numbers." The Viscount of Rohan brought 565 men-at-arms and 320 archers; Marshal Dinan 250 spears and 183 archers. "One could believe for a moment that all Brittany was going to rush on the castle of Pouancé". "All this must have increased to more than 6,000 the number of the besiegers, all good troops, well animated, well ordered, well supplied." The impressive quantities of material devolved to the headquarters were sent by more than a dozen carters requisitioned for forty days for the needs of the siege.

=== French counterattack and continuation of the siege ===
As early as 9 January, Ambrois de Loré attempted a diversionary maneuver with part of the garrison of La Guerche and attacked the Manoir du Plessis-Guérif in Pire, which belonged to Jacques Bonenfant, John V's chamberlain. George Riguemen's company was there. The surprise attack killed George Bonenfant, Jacques' brother, and left George Riguemen injured, who lost most of his company. The English were taken prisoner and the castle looted and burned. The duke then entered into a great fury.

The garrisons stationed in the towns of La Guerche, Croutia, and Chateau-Gontier were under the authority of the Duke of Alençon. They joined the fighting with many victorious skirmishes against the enemy companies.

The Duke of Alençon began to seek support. He received some from the Duke of Bourbon and some other allied lords, who sent him two thousand men-at-arms, to which was added the garrison of Chateau-Gontier. With these troops he thought himself able to break the siege of Pouancé. The Duke of Brittany, having heard of this project, sent for additional troops from Michelle and Chateaubriant. When the French appeared at sight of the besieged city, they were repulsed and pursued.

The conduct of the siege by the English and Bretons intensified: "We were working to undermine and undermine the place." "The Britons and the English made mines and other approaches." For this work, the Constable Richemont brought a Breton, Jean Moraud, to carry out the work of approaches to improve the efficiency of the artillery. Assley, an English captain, a relative of Roguemen, led the work of mines.

=== Negotiations and lifting of the siege ===
As the siege advanced and the number of Bretons increased daily, the Constable de Richemont, sensing the fall of the city, worried about the safety of the noblewomen remained in the fortress, including his sister, Marie, mother of Jean II, and Jeanne d'Orléans, the wife of his nephew. Above all, with himself fighting for Charles VII of France, he enjoyed little to fight alongside the English and did not see with a good eye the seizure of the "good place" of Pouancé.

He charged a gentleman from Pouancé, Guillaume de Saint-Aubin, to inform Ambroise de Loré at La Guerche that the situation was becoming precarious and to ask him to bring the information to the Duke of Alençon. Loré went to find the duke, resolved to negotiate, then, having obtained a safe conduct from the constable de Richemont, went to Chateaubriant on February 19 where he gave John V a "very respectful," letter of apology from his nephew.

Peace was negotiated through the mediation of the Constable de Richemont and the Count of Étampes. The siege of Pouancé was raised on 22 February. At the request of John Wick, the Duke of Alençon liberated Jean de Malestroit and all the English and Breton prisoners, pledged to deliver the place of La Guerche on bail and to pay a fine of 50,000 pounds of damages. The Duke of Brittany undertook, on his side, to return La Guerche to his nephew a year later and to pay the rest of the dowry of the Duchess of Alençon, or 15,000 pounds. He also had to compensate the English, "very mortified for this accommodation on which they had not been consulted."

== Sources ==
This page is a translation of fr:Siège de Pouancé (1432)
