= Vergonnes =

- Part of Ombrée d'Anjou
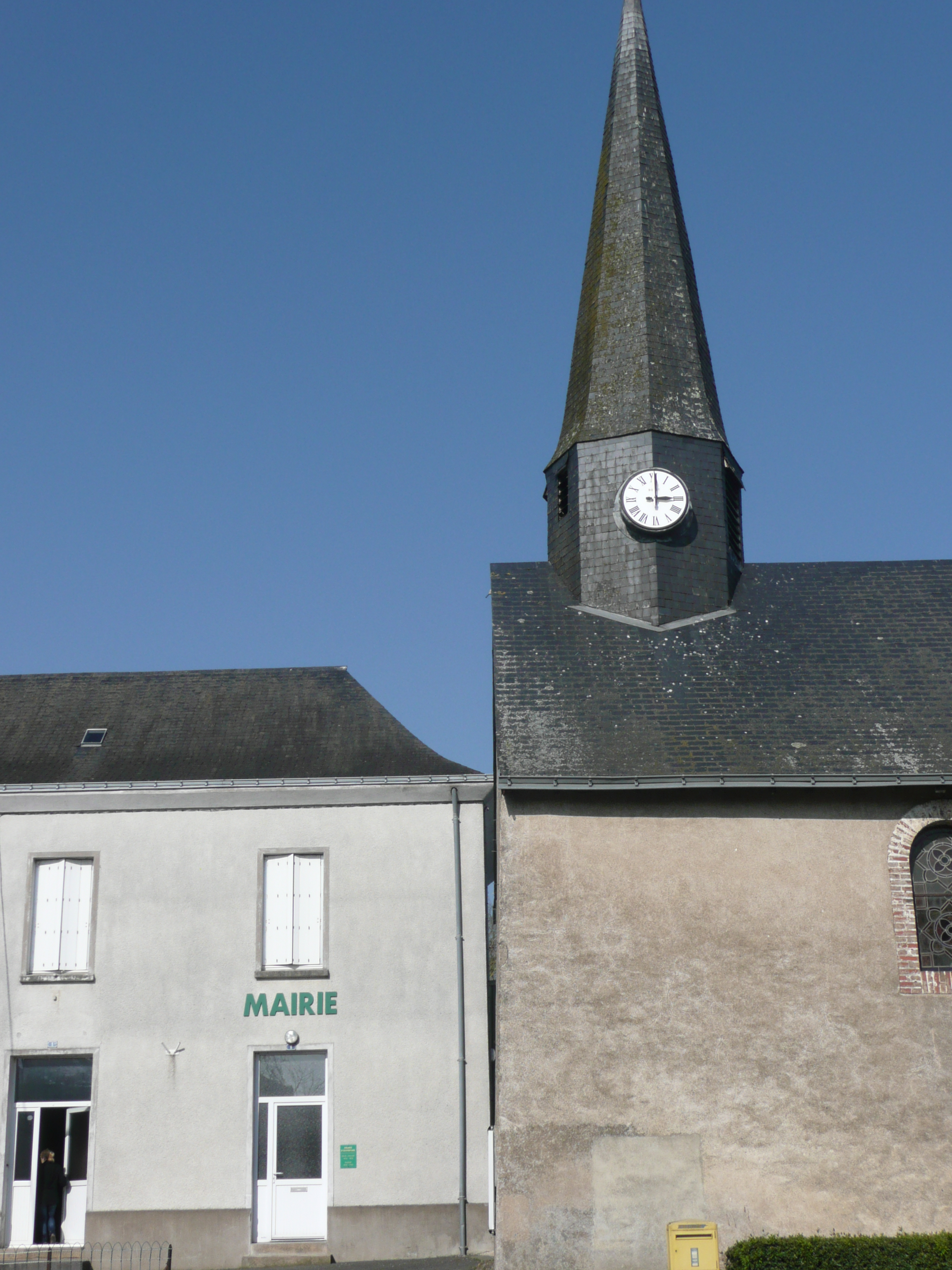
- Location of Vergonnes
- Location within France Location within Pays de la Loire
- Coordinates: 47°43′34″N 1°05′04″W
- Country: France
- Region: Pays de la Loire
- Department: Maine-et-Loire
- Arrondissement: Segré
- Canton: Segré
- Commune: Ombrée d'Anjou
- Area^{1}: 10.38 km^{2} (4.01 sq mi)
- Elevation: 103 m (338 ft)
- Highest elevation: 105 m (344 ft)
- Lowest elevation: 42 m (138 ft)
- Population (2022): 275
  - Density: 26.5/km^{2} (68.6/sq mi)
- Demonym(s): Vergonnais, Vergonnaise
- Time zone: UTC+01:00 (CET)
  - Summer (DST): UTC+02:00 (CEST)
- Postal code: 49420
- ^{1} French Land Register data, which excludes lakes, ponds, glaciers > 1 km^{2} (0.386 sq mi or 247 acres) and river estuaries.

Vergonnes (French pronunciation: [vɛʁɡɔn]) is a former commune in the Maine-et-Loire department in western France. On 15 December 2016, it was merged into the new commune Ombrée d'Anjou.

== See also ==
- Communes of the Maine-et-Loire department
