= Grugé-l'Hôpital =

- Part of Ombrée d'Anjou
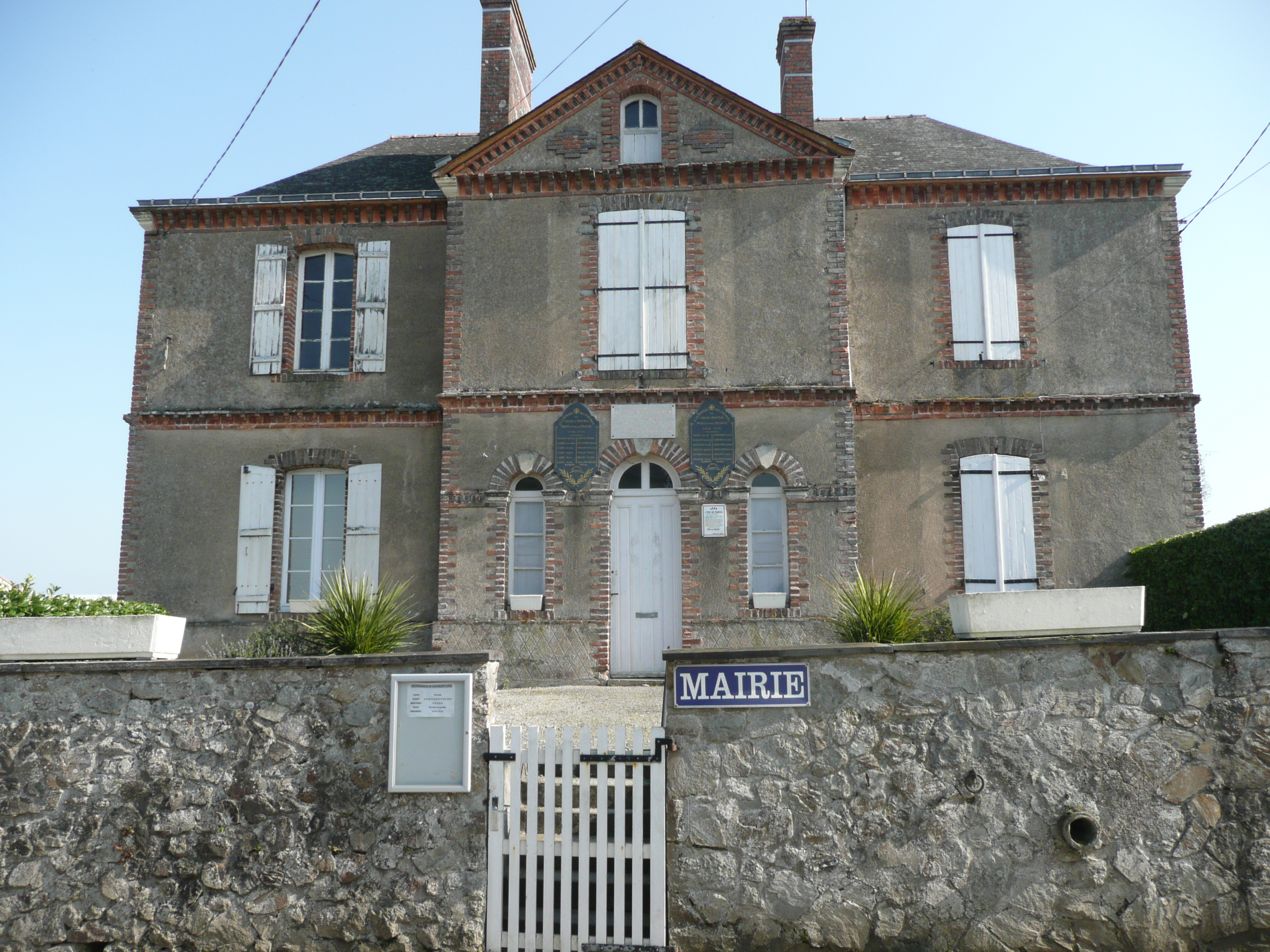
- Town hall
- Location of Grugé-l'Hôpital
- Location within France Location within Pays de la Loire
- Coordinates: 47°45′08″N 1°02′18″W
- Country: France
- Region: Pays de la Loire
- Department: Maine-et-Loire
- Arrondissement: Segré
- Canton: Segré
- Commune: Ombrée d'Anjou
- Area^{1}: 15.71 km^{2} (6.07 sq mi)
- Elevation: 80 m (260 ft)
- Highest elevation: 108 m (354 ft)
- Lowest elevation: 41 m (135 ft)
- Population (2022): 296
  - Density: 18.8/km^{2} (48.8/sq mi)
- Demonym(s): Grugéen, Grugéenne
- Time zone: UTC+01:00 (CET)
  - Summer (DST): UTC+02:00 (CEST)
- Postal code: 49520
- ^{1} French Land Register data, which excludes lakes, ponds, glaciers > 1 km^{2} (0.386 sq mi or 247 acres) and river estuaries.

Grugé-l'Hôpital is a former commune in the Maine-et-Loire department in western France. On 15 December 2016, it was merged into the new commune Ombrée d'Anjou.

== See also ==
- Communes of the Maine-et-Loire department
