= Le Tremblay =

- Part of Ombrée d'Anjou
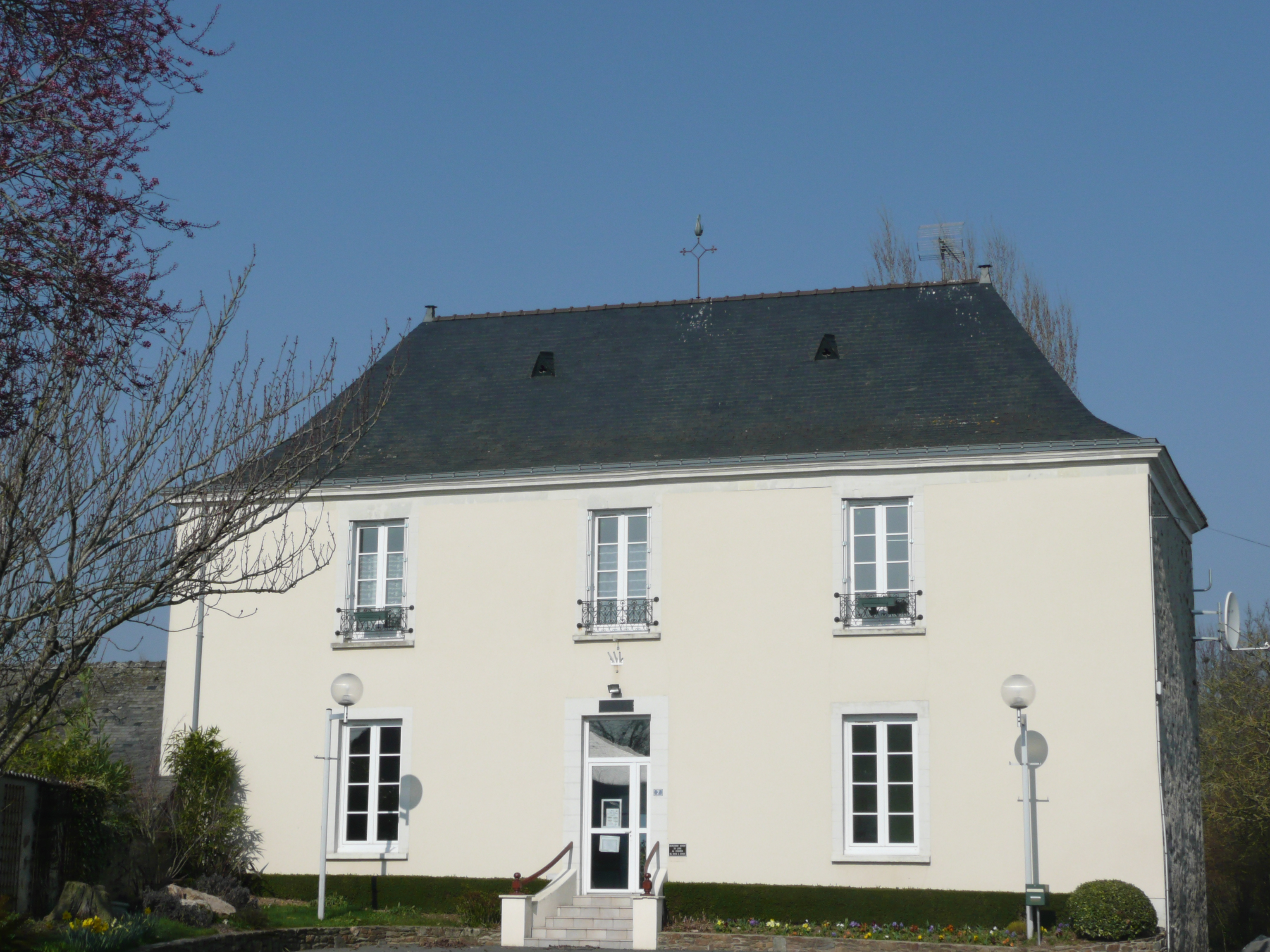
- Town hall
- Location of Le Tremblay
- Location within France Location within Pays de la Loire
- Coordinates: 47°40′43″N 1°00′59″W
- Country: France
- Region: Pays de la Loire
- Department: Maine-et-Loire
- Arrondissement: Segré
- Canton: Segré
- Commune: Ombrée d'Anjou
- Area^{1}: 22.97 km^{2} (8.87 sq mi)
- Elevation: 47 m (154 ft)
- Highest elevation: 105 m (344 ft)
- Lowest elevation: 32 m (105 ft)
- Population (2022): 407
  - Density: 17.7/km^{2} (45.9/sq mi)
- Demonym(s): Tremblaysien, Tremblaysienne
- Time zone: UTC+01:00 (CET)
  - Summer (DST): UTC+02:00 (CEST)
- Postal code: 49520
- ^{1} French Land Register data, which excludes lakes, ponds, glaciers > 1 km^{2} (0.386 sq mi or 247 acres) and river estuaries.

Le Tremblay (French pronunciation: [lə tʁɑ̃blɛ]) is a former commune in the Maine-et-Loire department in western France. On 15 December 2016, it was merged into the new commune Ombrée d'Anjou.

== Geography ==
The river Verzée forms all of the commune's northern border.

== See also ==
- Communes of the Maine-et-Loire department
