= Juigné-des-Moutiers =

Juigné-des-Moutiers Junyaé (Gallo) Yaoueneg-ar-Mousterioù (Breton)
- Commune
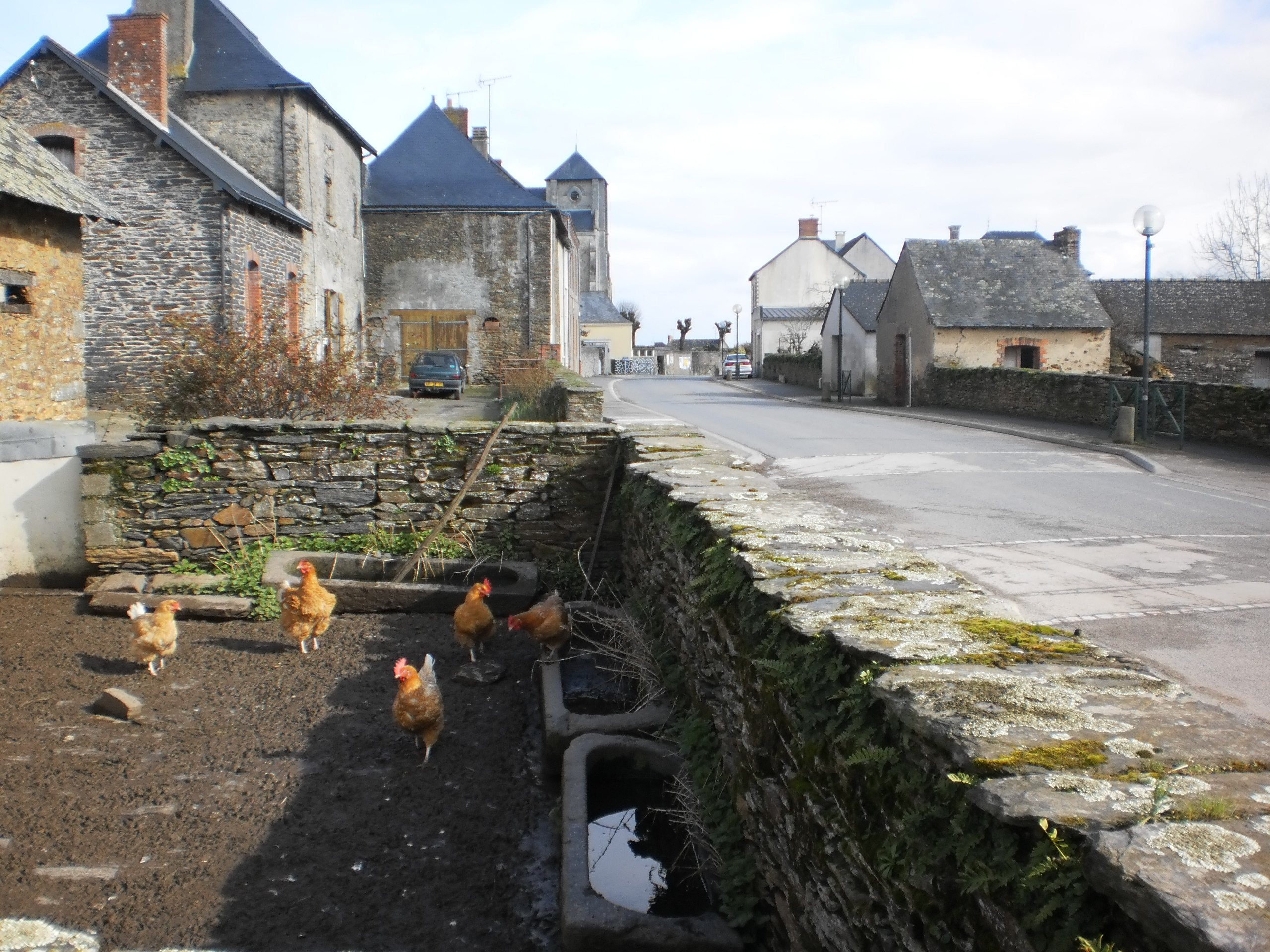

- Coat of arms
- Location of Juigné-des-Moutiers
- Location within France Location within Pays de la Loire
- Coordinates: 47°40′47″N 1°11′02″W
- Country: France
- Region: Pays de la Loire
- Department: Loire-Atlantique
- Arrondissement: Châteaubriant-Ancenis
- Canton: Châteaubriant
- Intercommunality: Châteaubriant-Derval

Government
  - Mayor (2020–2026): Brigitte Maison
- Area^{1}: 24.65 km^{2} (9.52 sq mi)
- Highest elevation: 102 m (335 ft)
- Lowest elevation: 52 m (171 ft)
- Population (2023): 334
  - Density: 13.5/km^{2} (35.1/sq mi)
- Time zone: UTC+01:00 (CET)
  - Summer (DST): UTC+02:00 (CEST)
- INSEE/Postal code: 44078 /44670
- ^{1} French Land Register data, which excludes lakes, ponds, glaciers > 1 km^{2} (0.386 sq mi or 247 acres) and river estuaries.

Juigné-des-Moutiers (French pronunciation: [ʒɥiɲe de mutje]; Gallo: Junyaé, Breton: Yaoueneg-ar-Mousterioù) is a commune in the Loire-Atlantique department in western France.

== Population ==
Historical population
Year	Pop.	±% p.a.
1968	435	—
1975	389	−1.58%
1982	366	−0.87%
1990	335	−1.10%
1999	322	−0.44%
2007	330	+0.31%
2012	351	+1.24%
2017	345	−0.34%
2023	334	−0.54%
Source: INSEE

== See also ==
- Communes of the Loire-Atlantique department
- Primaudière Priory
