= Chazé-Henry =

- Part of Ombrée d'Anjou
- Location of Chazé-Henry
- Location within France Location within Pays de la Loire
- Coordinates: 47°45′12″N 1°06′31″W
- Country: France
- Region: Pays de la Loire
- Department: Maine-et-Loire
- Arrondissement: Segré
- Canton: Segré
- Commune: Ombrée d'Anjou
- Area^{1}: 19.87 km^{2} (7.67 sq mi)
- Elevation: 96 m (315 ft)
- Highest elevation: 107 m (351 ft)
- Lowest elevation: 52 m (171 ft)
- Population (2022): 759
  - Density: 38.2/km^{2} (98.9/sq mi)
- Demonym(s): Chazéen, Chazéenne
- Time zone: UTC+01:00 (CET)
  - Summer (DST): UTC+02:00 (CEST)
- Postal code: 49420
- ^{1} French Land Register data, which excludes lakes, ponds, glaciers > 1 km^{2} (0.386 sq mi or 247 acres) and river estuaries.

Chazé-Henry (French pronunciation: [ʃaze ɑ̃ʁi]) is a former commune in the Maine-et-Loire department of western France. On 15 December 2016, it was merged into the new commune Ombrée d'Anjou.

== Notable people from Chazé-Henry ==
Gaston Davout was born in Chazé-Henry, and created his pseudonym Henri Chazé by reversing the name of his birthplace.

== See also ==
- Communes of the Maine-et-Loire department
