= Henri Chazé =

- Born: February 25, 1904; Chazé-Henry, France
- Died: December 3, 1984 (aged 62)
- Other name: Gaston Davoust
- Known for: Leading Left Communist

Henri Chazé (23 February 1904, in Chazé-Henry – 1984) was a French communist.

He was born Gaston Davoust in Chazé-Henry, whose name he reversed to form his pseudonym. His father, Eugène Davoust, was an anarchist railway worker active in his union. He was an advocate of the general strike as advocated by Émile Pouget. When Henri was six, his father participated in a major strike by railway workers for weekly rest periods and a better pension. The strike was broken by troops taking over the depots and Eugène was sacked. The family was thrown on hard times and survived by his mother making corsets.

His father was also an ardent freemason, as were his grandfather and brother, all affiliated to the Grand Orient of France. However, Henri found the initiation rituals degrading and the environment an example of the sort of organisation where men drawn from all sorts of classes would mix, creating opportunities for both the socially ambitious and spies of the Deuxième Bureau.

== Union Communiste ==
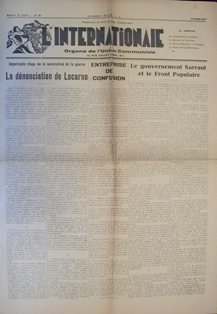
L'Internationale, edited by Henri Chazé

He was a founder member of Union Communiste in 1933 and became the editor of their journal L'Internationale.

== Works ==
- Pannekoek et les Conseils ouvriers (1962)
- La Révolution et la Guerre d’Espagne (1970)
- H. Chazé, Chronique de la Révolution espagnole, Union communiste (1933–1939), éditions Spartacus, Paris, 1979.
- Militantisme et responsabilité, Echanges et mouvement, Paris 2004. Présentation d'Henri Simon, texte et en annexe « Le crime des bagnes nazis : le peuple allemand est-il coresponsable ?. Extrait en ligne
- Gaston Davoust (H. Chazé): Le crime des bagnes nazis : le peuple allemand est-il coresponsable ? (Chazé, 1945), Franche-Comté Libération, 1945.
