= La Chapelle-Hullin =

- Part of Ombrée d'Anjou
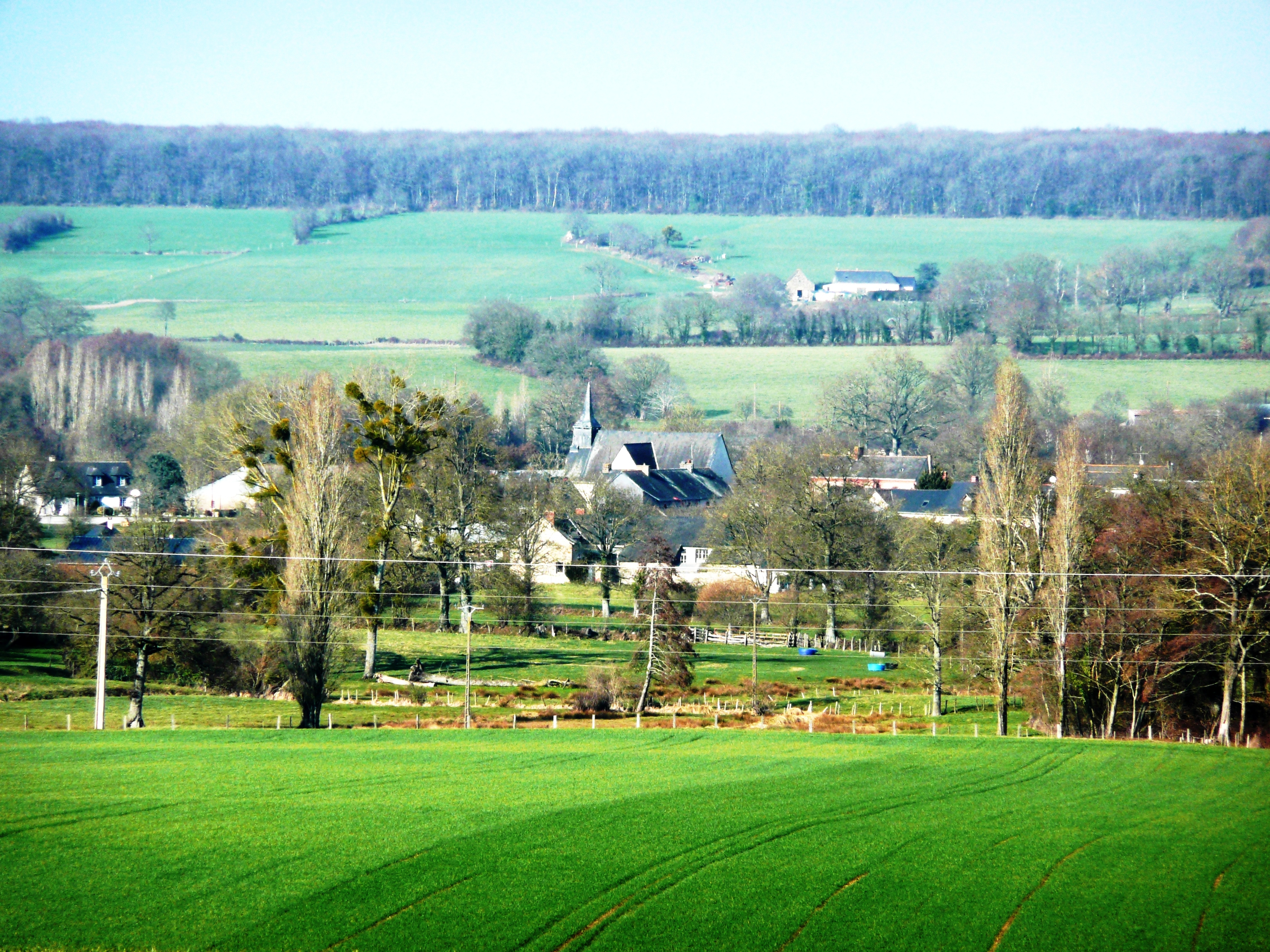
- Location of La Chapelle-Hullin
- Location within France Location within Pays de la Loire
- Coordinates: 47°45′33″N 1°04′09″W
- Country: France
- Region: Pays de la Loire
- Department: Maine-et-Loire
- Arrondissement: Segré
- Canton: Segré
- Commune: Ombrée d'Anjou
- Area^{1}: 9.79 km^{2} (3.78 sq mi)
- Elevation: 80 m (260 ft)
- Highest elevation: 105 m (344 ft)
- Lowest elevation: 46 m (151 ft)
- Population (2022): 128
  - Density: 13.1/km^{2} (33.9/sq mi)
- Time zone: UTC+01:00 (CET)
  - Summer (DST): UTC+02:00 (CEST)
- Postal code: 49420
- ^{1} French Land Register data, which excludes lakes, ponds, glaciers > 1 km^{2} (0.386 sq mi or 247 acres) and river estuaries.

La Chapelle-Hullin (French pronunciation: [la ʃapɛl ylɛ̃]) is a former commune in the Maine-et-Loire department of western France. On 15 December 2016, it was merged into the new commune Ombrée d'Anjou.

== See also ==
- Communes of the Maine-et-Loire department
