= Noëllet =

- Part of Ombrée d'Anjou
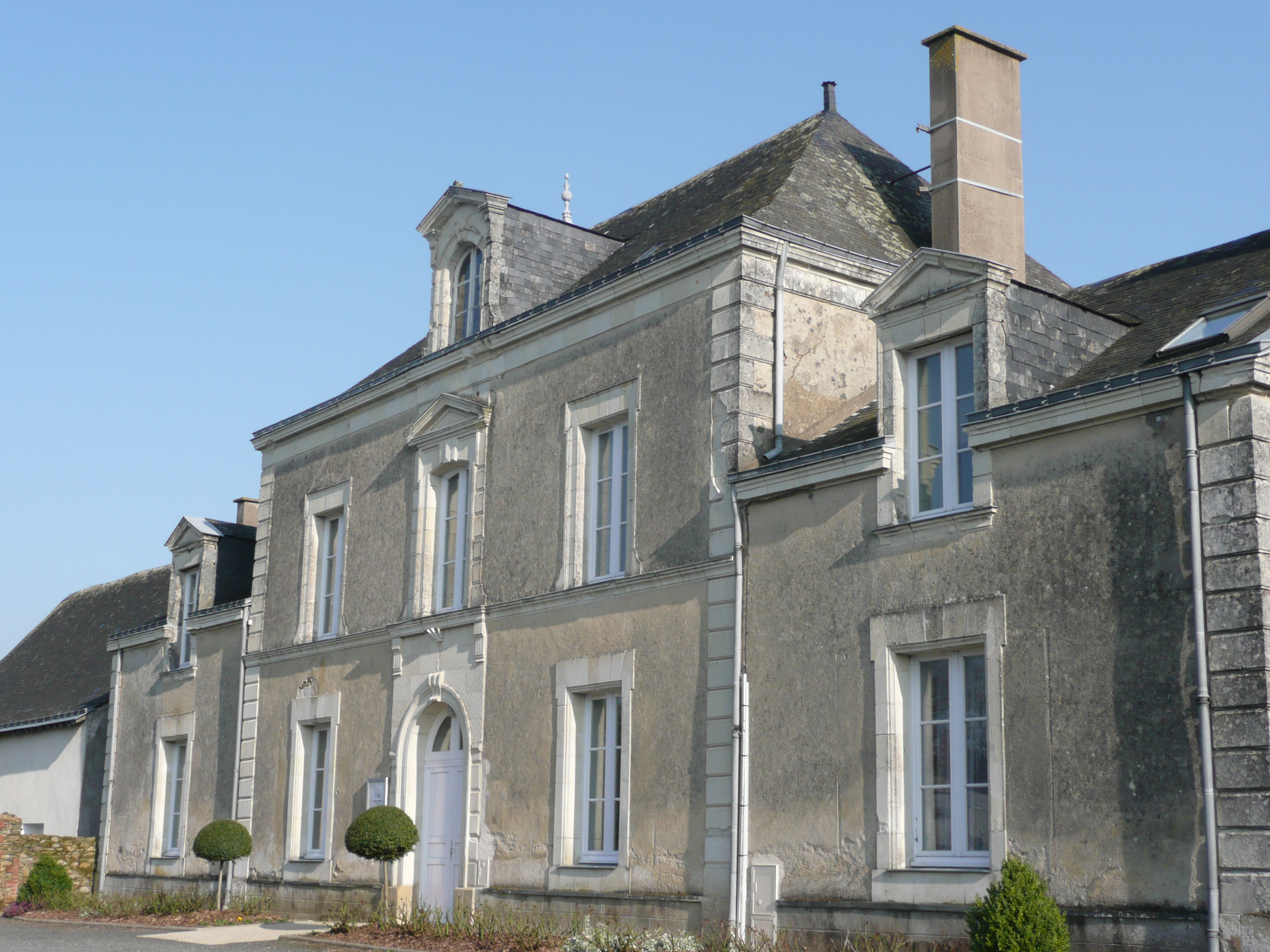
- Town hall
- Location of Noëllet
- Location within France Location within Pays de la Loire
- Coordinates: 47°41′40″N 1°05′25″W
- Country: France
- Region: Pays de la Loire
- Department: Maine-et-Loire
- Arrondissement: Segré
- Canton: Segré
- Commune: Ombrée d'Anjou
- Area^{1}: 15.4 km^{2} (5.9 sq mi)
- Elevation: 40 m (130 ft)
- Highest elevation: 104 m (341 ft)
- Lowest elevation: 33 m (108 ft)
- Population (2022): 473
  - Density: 30.7/km^{2} (79.5/sq mi)
- Time zone: UTC+01:00 (CET)
  - Summer (DST): UTC+02:00 (CEST)
- Postal code: 49520
- ^{1} French Land Register data, which excludes lakes, ponds, glaciers > 1 km^{2} (0.386 sq mi or 247 acres) and river estuaries.

Noëllet (French pronunciation: [nɔɛlɛ]) is a former commune in the Maine-et-Loire department in western France. On 15 December 2016, it was merged into the new commune Ombrée d'Anjou.

== Geography ==
The river Verzée flows southeastward through the northern part of the commune.

== Demography ==
Historical population
Year	Pop.	±% p.a.
1962	639	—
1968	573	−1.80%
1975	543	−0.77%
1982	494	−1.34%
1990	451	−1.13%
1999	393	−1.52%
2006	369	−0.90%
2022	473	+1.56%
Source: EHESS and INSEE

== See also ==
- Communes of the Maine-et-Loire department
