= Combrée =

- Part of Ombrée d'Anjou
- Location of Combrée
- Location within France Location within Pays de la Loire
- Coordinates: 47°42′18″N 1°01′48″W
- Country: France
- Region: Pays de la Loire
- Department: Maine-et-Loire
- Arrondissement: Segré
- Canton: Segré
- Commune: Ombrée d'Anjou
- Area^{1}: 24.16 km^{2} (9.33 sq mi)
- Elevation: 100 m (330 ft)
- Highest elevation: 106 m (348 ft)
- Lowest elevation: 32 m (105 ft)
- Population (2022): 2,732
  - Density: 113.1/km^{2} (292.9/sq mi)
- Time zone: UTC+01:00 (CET)
  - Summer (DST): UTC+02:00 (CEST)
- Postal code: 49520
- ^{1} French Land Register data, which excludes lakes, ponds, glaciers > 1 km^{2} (0.386 sq mi or 247 acres) and river estuaries.

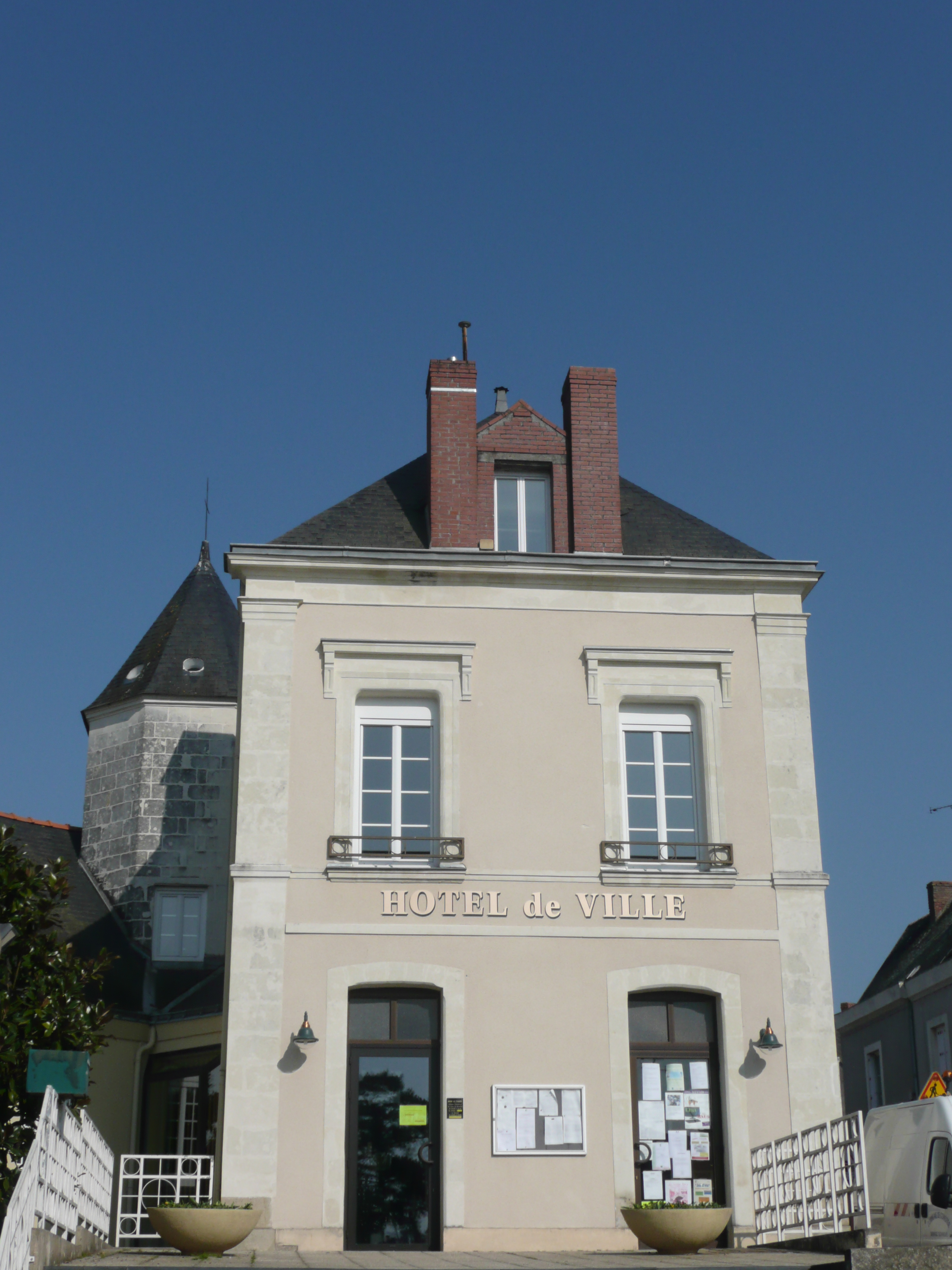
Mairie combrée

Combrée (French pronunciation: [kɔ̃bʁe]) is a former commune in the Maine-et-Loire department in western France. On 15 December 2016, it was merged into the new commune Ombrée d'Anjou.

== Geography ==
The river Verzée forms all of the commune's southern border.

== Demographics ==
Historical population
| Year | Pop. | ±% p.a. |
|---|---|---|
| 1962 | 3,031 | — |
| 1968 | 2,975 | −0.31% |
| 1975 | 2,644 | −1.67% |
| 1982 | 2,570 | −0.40% |
| 1990 | 2,560 | −0.05% |
| 1999 | 2,410 | −0.67% |
| 2007 | 2,611 | +1.01% |
| 2012 | 2,816 | +1.52% |
| 2022 | 2,732 | −0.30% |
Source: EHESS and INSEE

== See also ==
- Communes of the Maine-et-Loire department
