= Pouancé =

- Part of Ombrée d'Anjou
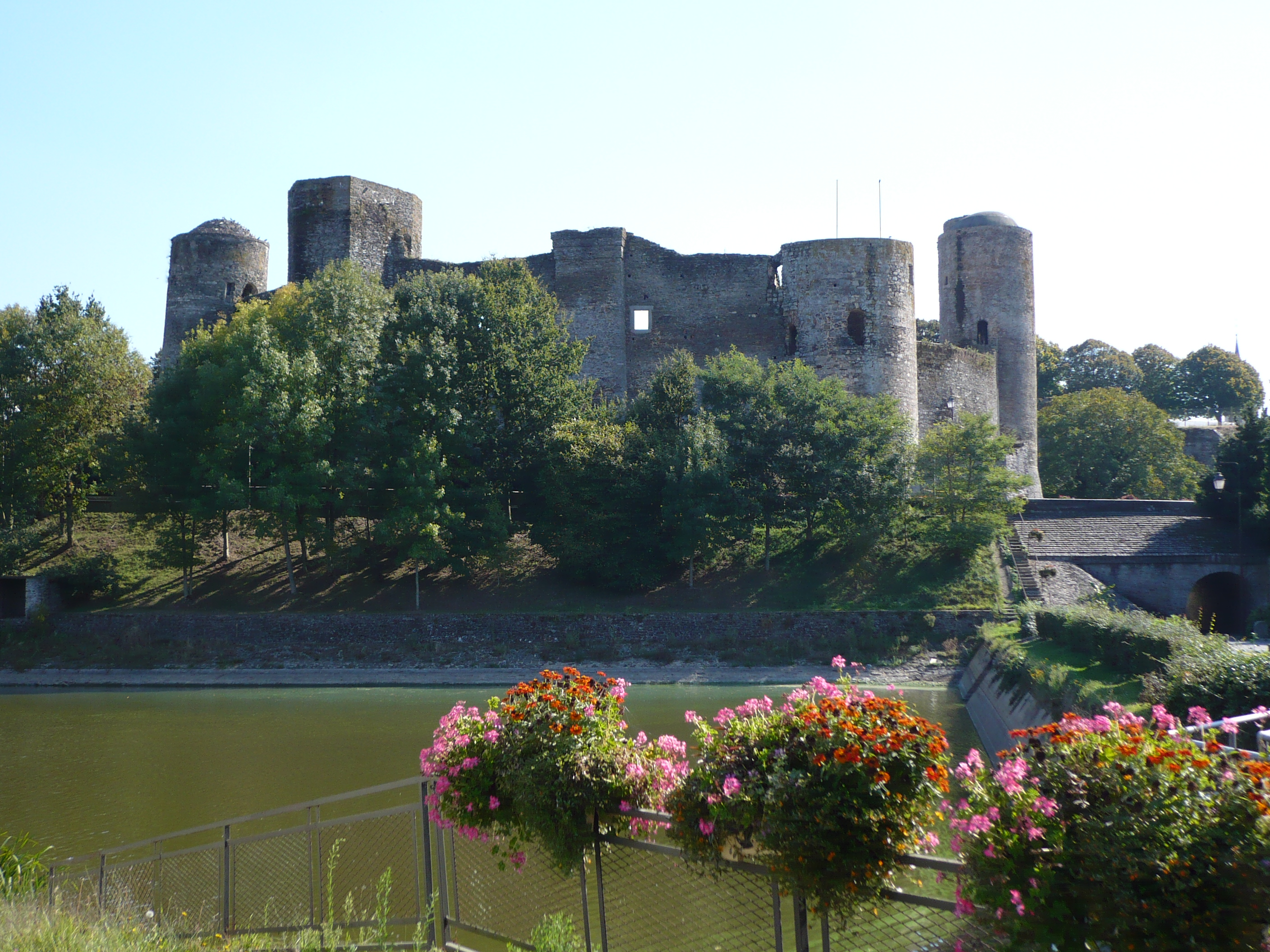
- Pouancé Castle

- Coat of arms
- Location of Pouancé
- Location within France Location within Pays de la Loire
- Coordinates: 47°44′29″N 1°10′30″W
- Country: France
- Region: Pays de la Loire
- Department: Maine-et-Loire
- Arrondissement: Segré
- Canton: Segré
- Commune: Ombrée d'Anjou
- Area^{1}: 48.97 km^{2} (18.91 sq mi)
- Highest elevation: 108 m (354 ft)
- Lowest elevation: 48 m (157 ft)
- Population (2022): 3,133
  - Density: 63.98/km^{2} (165.7/sq mi)
- Time zone: UTC+01:00 (CET)
  - Summer (DST): UTC+02:00 (CEST)
- Postal code: 49420
- ^{1} French Land Register data, which excludes lakes, ponds, glaciers > 1 km^{2} (0.386 sq mi or 247 acres) and river estuaries.

Pouancé (French pronunciation: [pwɑ̃se]) is a former commune in the Maine-et-Loire department in western France. On 15 December 2016, it was merged into the new commune Ombrée d'Anjou. It is located on the border of 4 French departements: Maine-et-Loire, Mayenne in the north, Ille-et-Vilaine in the north-west, and Loire-Atlantique in the west.

During the Middle Ages, Pouancé was situated on the border between Anjou, part of the Kingdom of France, and the independent duchy of Brittany. The city gained the nickname of "Door of Anjou, March of Brittany". The town retains its partially preserved city walls, some of its city gates and its medieval castle, which is the second largest in Anjou.

== History ==
The menhir of Pierrefrite is one of the only remains from the prehistory in Pouancé region, along with some stone axes and an arrowhead. The menhir is located on the border of the commune of Armaillé et Saint-Michel-et-Chanveaux, and is made of red slate and stands 5 meters tall.

After the discovery of pieces of tegulae in a wood, it is assumed that a Roman kiln existed, and along with it, a Gallo-Roman settlement.

The earliest location of a settlement on the territory is believed to be the village of Saint-Aubin, about one kilometre from the center of Pouancé. In the walls of Saint-Aubin's church (which dates from the 12th century) the remains of a Merovingian sarcophagus were found.

The first known lord of Pouancé was Manguinoë, from 990 to 1037. It is believed that he built the first castle, which was constructed in a motte-and-bailey style. For defensive reasons, the motte was built one kilometre from Saint-Aubin, on a slate hill. At the end of the 12th century, a medieval village grew up around the castle, the first towers were built, and the village was fortified. When the fortress was complete, it consisted of 15 towers and 3 defensive walls.

During the reign of Charles V of France, a permanent tax (the gabelle) was placed on salt. Anjou became a pays de grandes gabelles, where tax was heaviest. Because Brittany was exempt from this tax, an important smuggling route developed across the border of Anjou and Brittany. In 1343, a greniers à sel (salt granary) was established in Pouancé to store the salt and judge disputes surrounding the tax. The smuggling was so prevalent in Pouancé that a special jail for the faux-sauniers (name for the salt smugglers) was built.

During the Hundred Years' War, Pouancé was besieged twice: first in 1432 by John VI, Duke of Brittany, who was allied with English and Scottish troops. The second time was in 1443, by John Beaufort, 1st Duke of Somerset. However, the city managed to resist both times, and the attackers were forced to retreat.

During the 16th century, Pouancé was also famous in Anjou for its forges. The French royal navy commissioned the forges for several thousand round shots.

After the French Revolution, Pouancé became the chef-lieu of a canton. The canton of Pouancé groups together 14 communes.

=== Toponymy ===
The etymology of Pouancé could come from the latin name, Potentius, derived from the latin potens (powerful). Others make its derived from the Celtic pouleum (a hill, or a butte). The first mention of Pouancé dated from 1050, when the town was named Poenciacum and Pautiacum. As time passed by, Pouancé bore the following names:

- 1070: Poenci
- 1080: Castellum Poenci
- 1090: Poenceiaco
- 1081-1105: Pontiacum
- 1078-1105: Poenceium
- 1132: Poencé
- 1180: Poentium
- 1190-1202: Poanci
- 1207: Pohencetum
- 1220: Castrum Pouencé
- 1680: Poencé
- 1715: Poancé
- 1720: Povencé
- 1725: Pouancé

=== Coat of arms ===
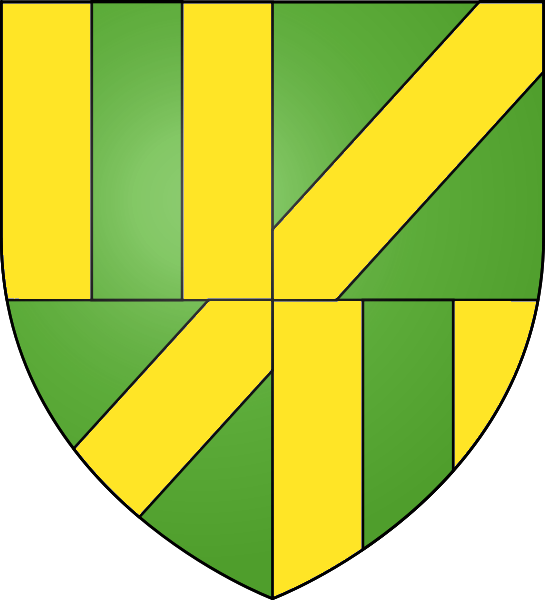
Coat of arms of Pouancé
Arms/Standard	Description
	Quarterly, first and fourth silver and pale green, second and third green and silver.
	Quarterly,1&4 Paly of three Vert & Or, 2&3 Vert, overall a bendlet sinister also Or

== Geography ==
=== Geology and hydrology ===
The river Semnon forms part of the commune's northern border, along with the Araize.

The river Verzée flows southeastward through the southern part of the commune and crosses the town. It forms the lake of Saint-Aubin, then the lake of Pouancé just under the castle, and finally the lake of Tressé.

=== Climate ===
Month	Jan	Feb	March	Apr	May	June	July	Aug	Sept	Oct	Nov	Dec	Year
Average high (°C)	7,9	9,2	12,6	15,3	19	22,6	24,9	24,7	21,8	17	11,4	8,4	16,2
Average low (°C)	2,1	2,2	3,9	5,6	8,9	11,8	13,6	13,4	11,3	8,4	4,6	2,8	7,4
Average temperatures (°C)	5	5,7	8,2	10.4	13,9	16,2	19,2	19,1	16,5	12,7	8	5,6	11,8
Months average of precipitations (mm)	62,1	50,8	51,7	44,6	54,4	41,2	43,8	44,9	52,2	59,6	64,5	63,4	633,4
Monthly length of sunlight (hours/month)	70	92	141	179	201	234	248	237	191	129	89	65	1877
Source : Climatologie de 1947 à 2008 - Angers, France

=== Evolution ===
Historical population

Year	Pop.	±% p.a.
1793	1,034	—
1800	1,306	+3.39%
1806	1,915	+6.59%
1821	1,956	+0.14%
1831	2,560	+2.73%
1836	2,765	+1.55%
1841	2,821	+0.40%
1846	2,758	−0.45%
1851	2,895	+0.97%
1856	3,001	+0.72%
1861	3,227	+1.46%
1866	3,266	+0.24%
1872	3,273	+0.04%
1876	3,390	+0.88%
1881	3,446	+0.33%
1886	3,502	+0.32%
1891	3,508	+0.03%
1896	3,355	−0.89%

Year	Pop.	±% p.a.
1901	3,278	−0.46%
1906	3,198	−0.49%
1911	3,093	−0.67%
1921	2,755	−1.15%
1926	2,762	+0.05%
1931	2,804	+0.30%
1936	2,836	+0.23%
1946	3,218	+1.27%
1954	3,119	−0.39%
1962	3,094	−0.10%
1968	3,017	−0.42%
1975	3,165	+0.69%
1982	3,299	+0.59%
1990	3,279	−0.08%
1999	3,307	+0.09%
2007	3,355	+0.18%
2012	3,192	−0.99%
2022	3,133	−0.19%

Source: EHESS and INSEE (2007-2017)

== Places of interest ==
- Pouancé Castle

== Twin cities ==
- (Romania) Şopotu Nou since 2007 (Website).

== See also ==
- Communes of the Maine-et-Loire department
