= Ombrée d'Anjou =

- Commune
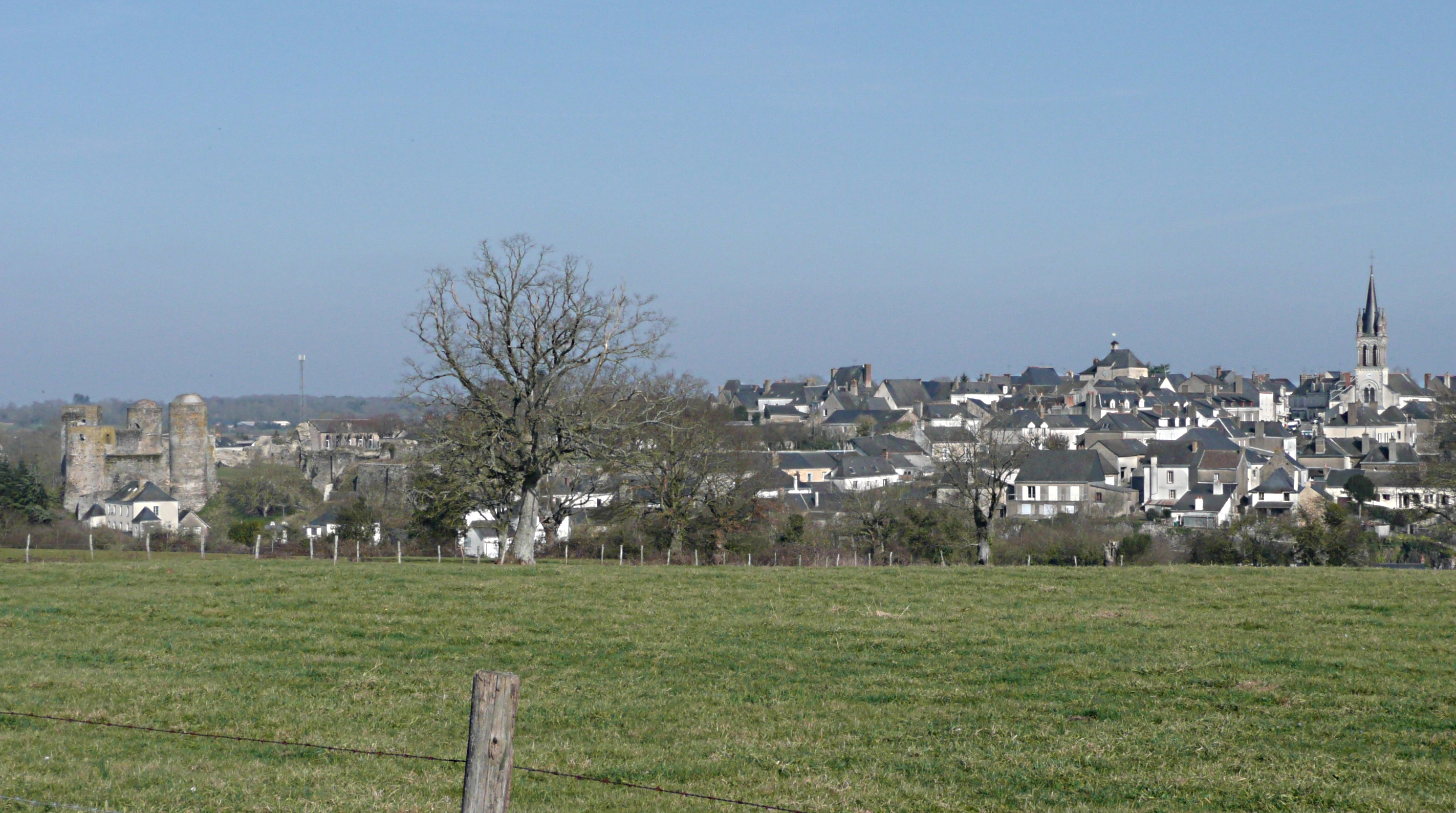
- A general view of Pouancé
- Location of Ombrée d'Anjou
- Location within France Location within Pays de la Loire
- Coordinates: 47°43′34″N 1°02′53″W
- Country: France
- Region: Pays de la Loire
- Department: Maine-et-Loire
- Arrondissement: Segré
- Canton: Segré-en-Anjou Bleu
- Intercommunality: Anjou Bleu

Government
  - Mayor (2020–2026): Pierrick Esnault
- Area^{1}: 202.16 km^{2} (78.05 sq mi)
- Population (2023): 8,813
  - Density: 43.59/km^{2} (112.9/sq mi)
- Time zone: UTC+01:00 (CET)
  - Summer (DST): UTC+02:00 (CEST)
- INSEE/Postal code: 49248 /49420, 49520
- ^{1} French Land Register data, which excludes lakes, ponds, glaciers > 1 km^{2} (0.386 sq mi or 247 acres) and river estuaries.

Ombrée d'Anjou (French pronunciation: [ɔ̃bʁe dɑ̃ʒu]) is a commune in the Maine-et-Loire department of western France. The municipality was established on 15 December 2016 and consists of the former communes of La Chapelle-Hullin, Chazé-Henry, Combrée, Grugé-l'Hôpital, Noëllet, Pouancé, La Prévière, Saint-Michel-et-Chanveaux, Le Tremblay and Vergonnes.

== Population ==
The population data given in the table below refer to the commune in its geography as of January 2025.

Historical population
Year	Pop.	±% p.a.
1968	10,052	—
1975	9,469	−0.85%
1982	9,377	−0.14%
1990	9,110	−0.36%
1999	8,781	−0.41%
2007	8,764	−0.02%
2012	8,895	+0.30%
2017	8,998	+0.23%
2023	8,813	−0.35%
Source: INSEE

== See also ==
- Communes of the Maine-et-Loire department
