= Saint-Michel-et-Chanveaux =

- Part of Ombrée d'Anjou
- Location of Saint-Michel-et-Chanveaux
- Location within France Location within Pays de la Loire
- Coordinates: 47°40′52″N 1°07′45″W
- Country: France
- Region: Pays de la Loire
- Department: Maine-et-Loire
- Arrondissement: Segré
- Canton: Segré
- Commune: Ombrée d'Anjou
- Area^{1}: 27.67 km^{2} (10.68 sq mi)
- Elevation: 110 m (360 ft)
- Highest elevation: 105 m (344 ft)
- Lowest elevation: 39 m (128 ft)
- Population (2022): 378
  - Density: 13.7/km^{2} (35.4/sq mi)
- Time zone: UTC+01:00 (CET)
  - Summer (DST): UTC+02:00 (CEST)
- Postal code: 49420
- ^{1} French Land Register data, which excludes lakes, ponds, glaciers > 1 km^{2} (0.386 sq mi or 247 acres) and river estuaries.

Saint-Michel-et-Chanveaux (French pronunciation: [sɛ̃ miʃɛl e ʃɑ̃vo]) is a former commune in the Maine-et-Loire department in western France. On 15 December 2016, it was merged into the new commune Ombrée d'Anjou. Its population was 378 in 2022.

== See also ==
- Communes of the Maine-et-Loire department
