= Verzée =

River in France

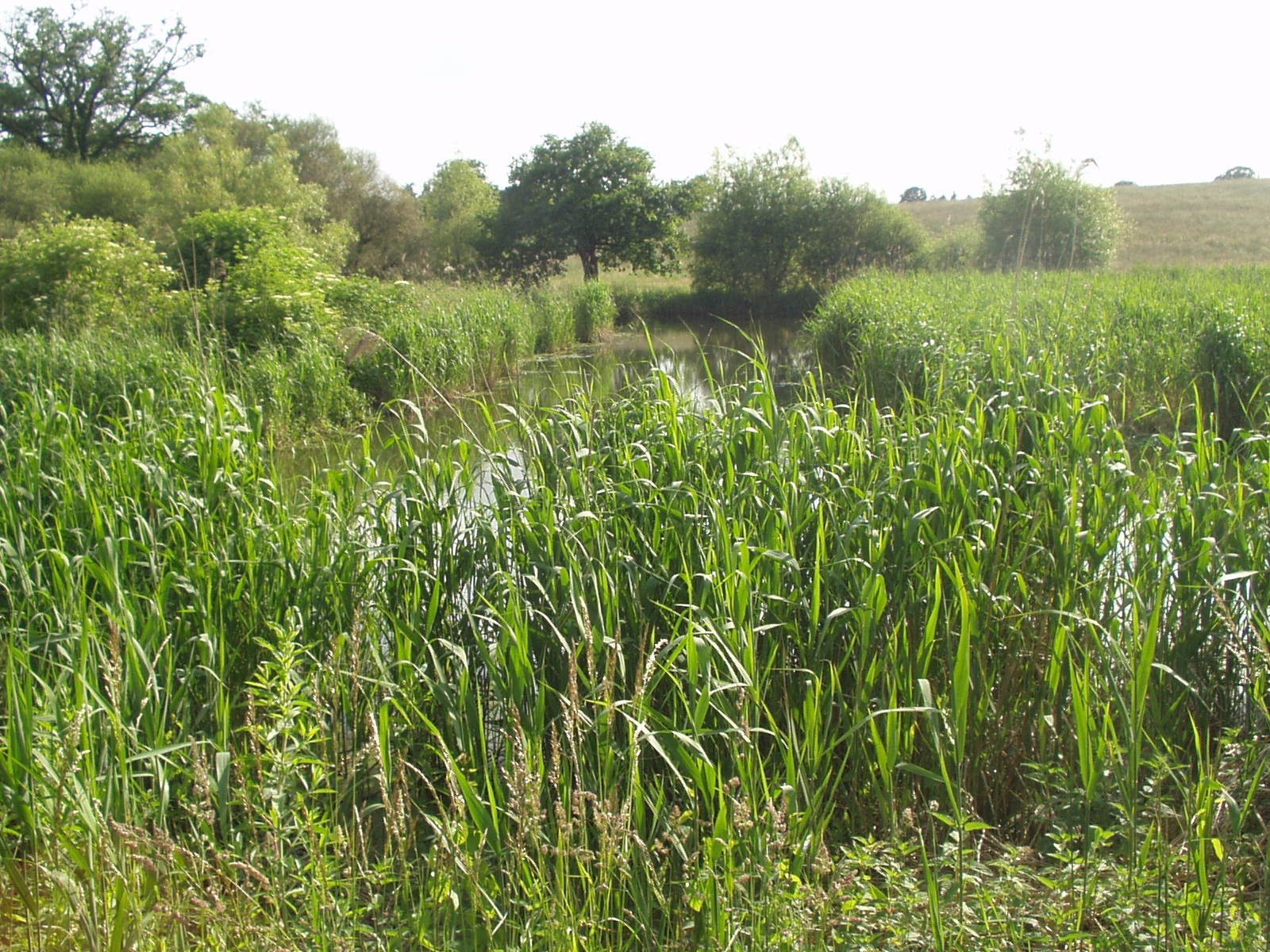
- Verzée river, in Pouancé

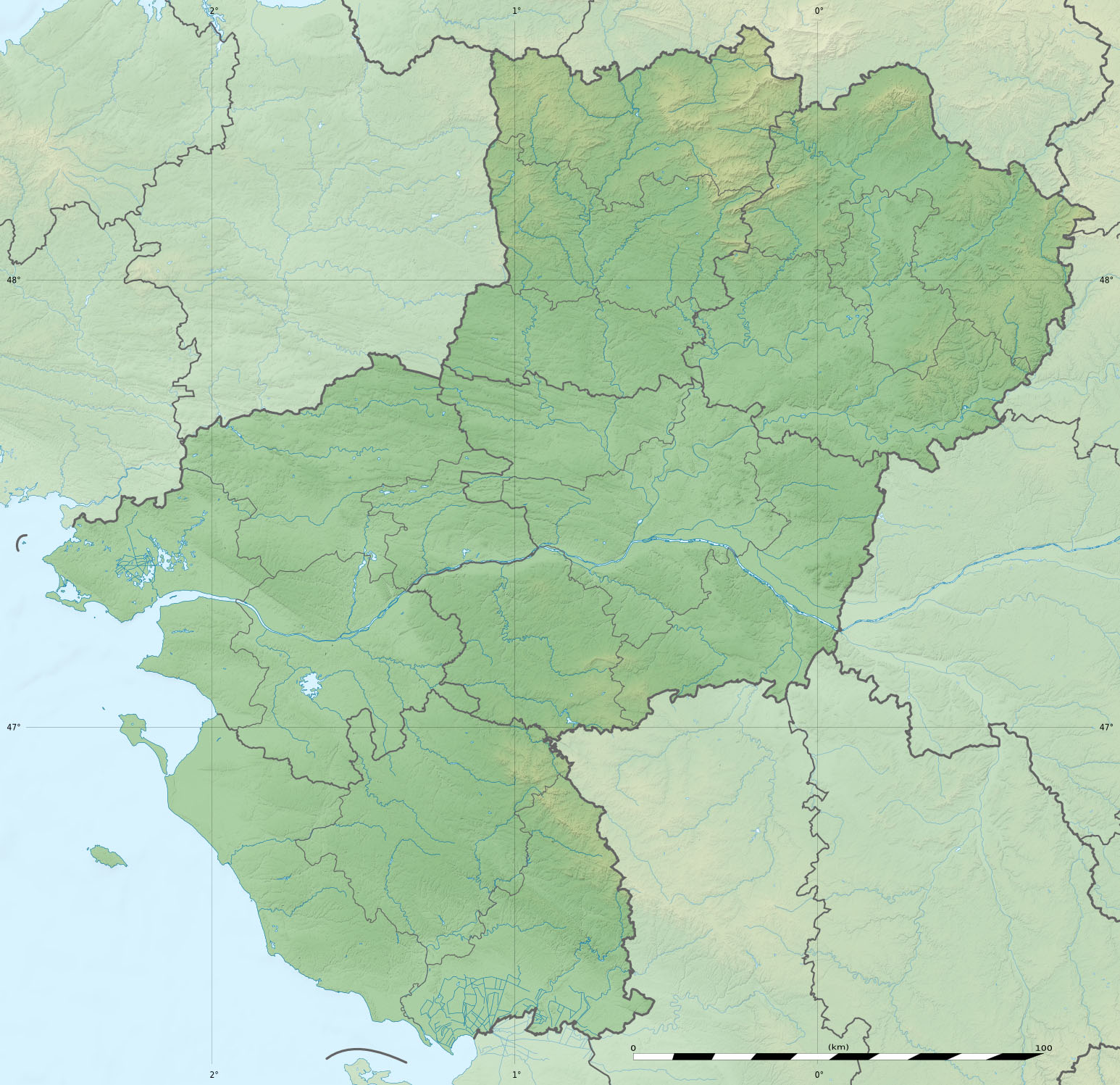
- Location within France Location within Pays de la Loire

Location
- Country: France

Physical characteristics
- Source
  - location: Soudan
  - coordinates: 47°45′39″N 01°19′41″W
  - elevation: 95 m (312 ft)
- Mouth
  - location: Oudon
  - coordinates: 47°41′09″N 00°52′11″W
  - elevation: 25 m (82 ft)
- Length: 52.1 km (32.4 mi)
- Basin size: 410 km^{2} (160 sq mi)
- Discharge
  - average: 2.1 m^{3}/s (74 cu ft/s)

Basin features
- Progression: Oudon→ Mayenne→ Maine→ Loire→ Atlantic Ocean

The Verzée (French pronunciation: [vɛʁze]) is a 52.1-kilometre-long (32.4 mi) river in the Loire-Atlantique and Maine-et-Loire départements, western France. Its source is at Soudan. It flows generally east-southeast. It is a right tributary of the Oudon into which it flows at Segré.

== Communes along its course ==
This list is ordered from source to mouth:

- Loire-Atlantique: Soudan, Noyal-sur-Brutz, Villepot
- Maine-et-Loire: Pouancé, La Prévière, Armaillé, Noëllet, Le Tremblay, Combrée, Le Bourg-d'Iré, Noyant-la-Gravoyère, Sainte-Gemmes-d'Andigné, Segré
