= La Prévière =

- Part of Ombrée d'Anjou
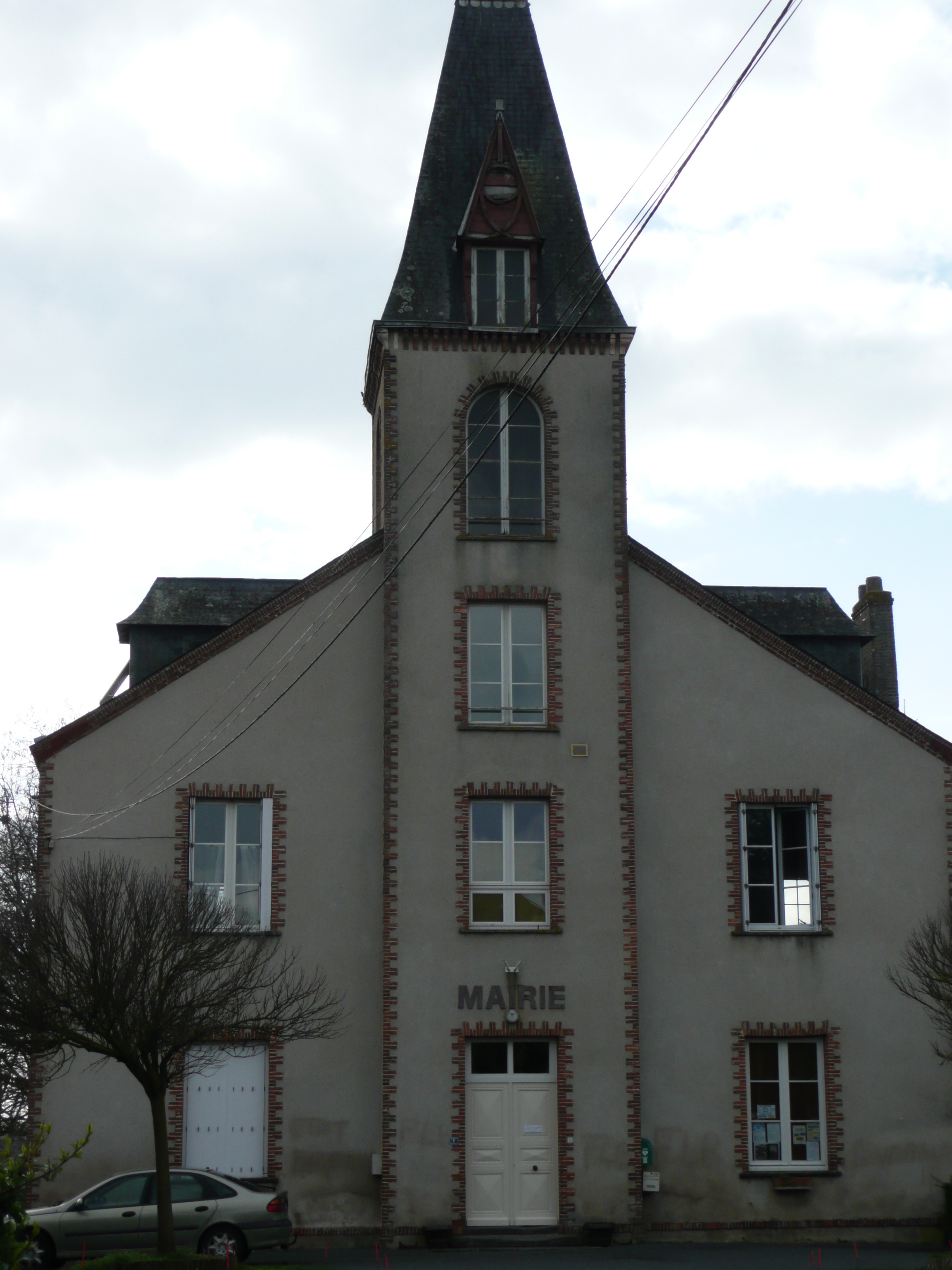
- Town hall
- Location of La Prévière
- Location within France Location within Pays de la Loire
- Coordinates: 47°43′06″N 1°10′36″W
- Country: France
- Region: Pays de la Loire
- Department: Maine-et-Loire
- Arrondissement: Segré
- Canton: Segré
- Commune: Ombrée d'Anjou
- Area^{1}: 7.24 km^{2} (2.80 sq mi)
- Elevation: 79 m (259 ft)
- Highest elevation: 100 m (330 ft)
- Lowest elevation: 47 m (154 ft)
- Population (2022): 230
  - Density: 32/km^{2} (82/sq mi)
- Demonym(s): Epervier, Epervière
- Time zone: UTC+01:00 (CET)
  - Summer (DST): UTC+02:00 (CEST)
- Postal code: 49420
- ^{1} French Land Register data, which excludes lakes, ponds, glaciers > 1 km^{2} (0.386 sq mi or 247 acres) and river estuaries.

La Prévière (French pronunciation: [la pʁevjɛʁ]) is a former commune in the Maine-et-Loire department in western France. On 15 December 2016, it was merged into the new commune Ombrée d'Anjou.

== Geography ==
The river Verzée forms all of the commune's north-eastern border.

== See also ==
- Communes of the Maine-et-Loire department
