= Armaillé =

- Commune
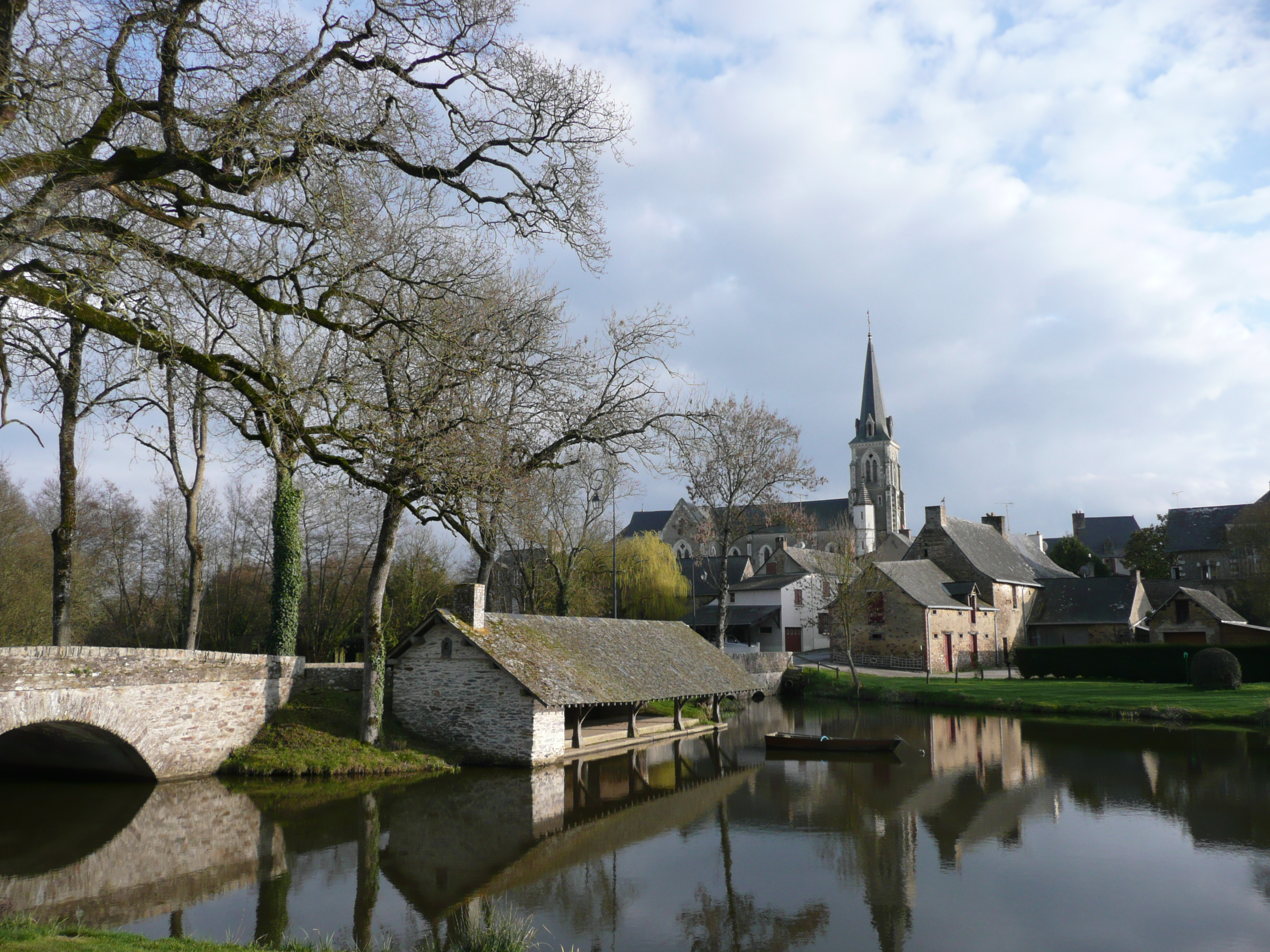
- A general view of Armaillé
- Location of Armaillé
- Location within France Location within Pays de la Loire
- Coordinates: 47°42′54″N 1°07′39″W
- Country: France
- Region: Pays de la Loire
- Department: Maine-et-Loire
- Arrondissement: Segré
- Canton: Segré-en-Anjou Bleu
- Intercommunality: Anjou Bleu Communauté

Government
  - Mayor (2020–2026): Emmanuelle Galisson
- Area^{1}: 16.78 km^{2} (6.48 sq mi)
- Elevation: 97 m (318 ft)
- Highest elevation: 100 m (330 ft)
- Lowest elevation: 39 m (128 ft)
- Population (2023): 320
  - Density: 19/km^{2} (49/sq mi)
- Time zone: UTC+01:00 (CET)
  - Summer (DST): UTC+02:00 (CEST)
- INSEE/Postal code: 49010 /49420
- ^{1} French Land Register data, which excludes lakes, ponds, glaciers > 1 km^{2} (0.386 sq mi or 247 acres) and river estuaries.

Armaillé (French pronunciation: [aʁmaje]) is a commune in the Maine-et-Loire department in western France.

== Geography ==
The village lies on the right bank of the Verzée, which flows east-southeast through the commune.

== Population ==
Historical population
Year	Pop.	±% p.a.
1968	403	—
1975	335	−2.61%
1982	307	−1.24%
1990	297	−0.41%
1999	290	−0.26%
2007	294	+0.17%
2012	293	−0.07%
2017	314	+1.39%
2023	320	+0.32%
Source: INSEE

== See also ==
- Communes of the Maine-et-Loire department
- Primaudière Priory
