= Fougerolles-du-Plessis =

- Commune
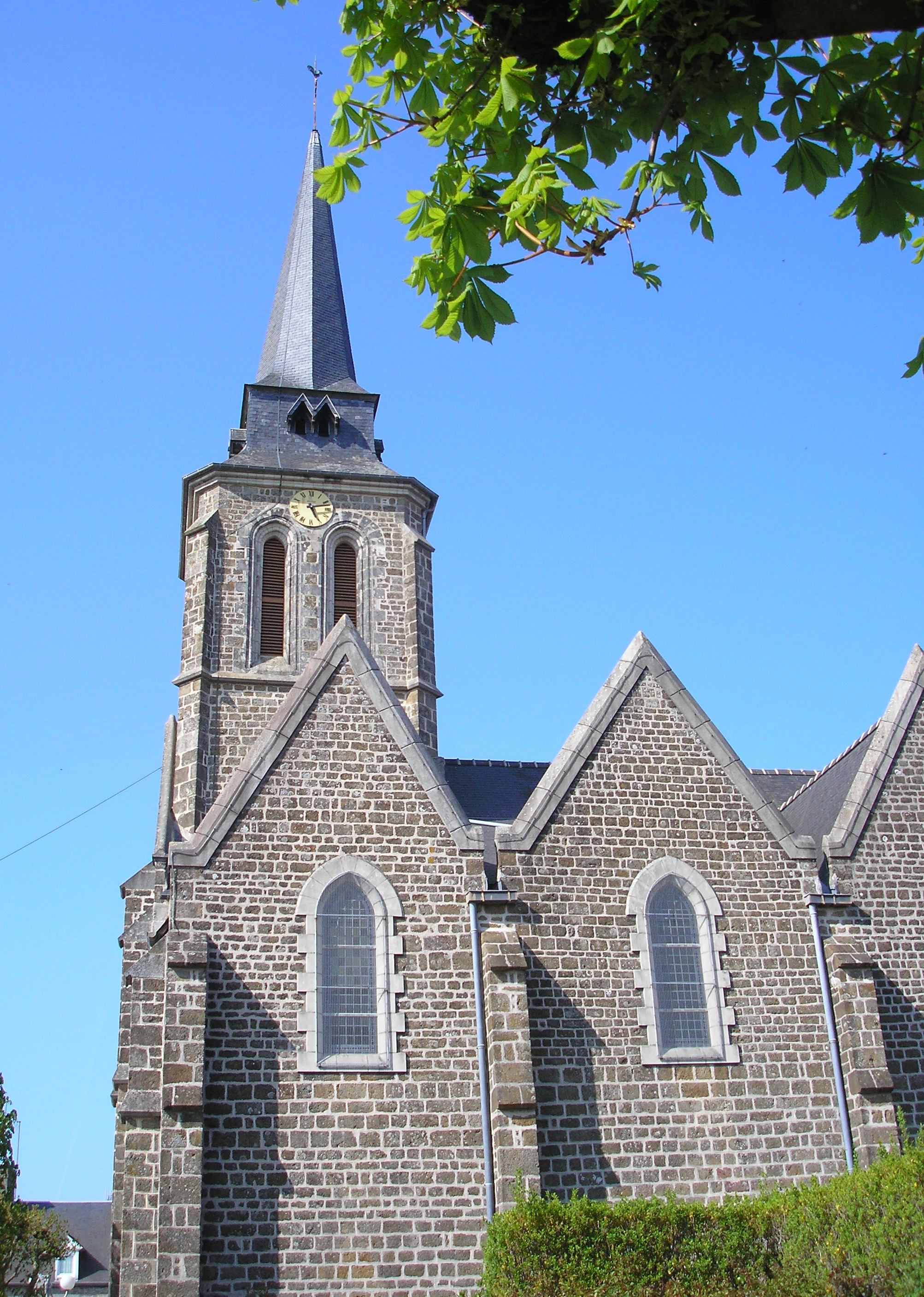
- The Church of the Immaculate Conception

- Coat of arms
- Location of Fougerolles-du-Plessis
- Location within France Location within Pays de la Loire
- Coordinates: 48°28′29″N 0°58′20″W
- Country: France
- Region: Pays de la Loire
- Department: Mayenne
- Arrondissement: Mayenne
- Canton: Gorron

Government
  - Mayor (2020–2026): Jean-Paul Juin
- Area^{1}: 33.29 km^{2} (12.85 sq mi)
- Elevation: 180 m (590 ft)
- Highest elevation: 232 m (761 ft)
- Lowest elevation: 128 m (420 ft)
- Population (2023): 1,215
  - Density: 36.50/km^{2} (94.53/sq mi)
- Time zone: UTC+01:00 (CET)
  - Summer (DST): UTC+02:00 (CEST)
- INSEE/Postal code: 53100 /53190
- ^{1} French Land Register data, which excludes lakes, ponds, glaciers > 1 km^{2} (0.386 sq mi or 247 acres) and river estuaries.

Fougerolles-du-Plessis (French pronunciation: [fuʒʁɔl dy plɛsi]) is a commune in the Mayenne department in north-western France.

== Geography ==
The commune contains the source of the river Colmont.

== See also ==
- Communes of the Mayenne department
