= Le Pas =

- Commune
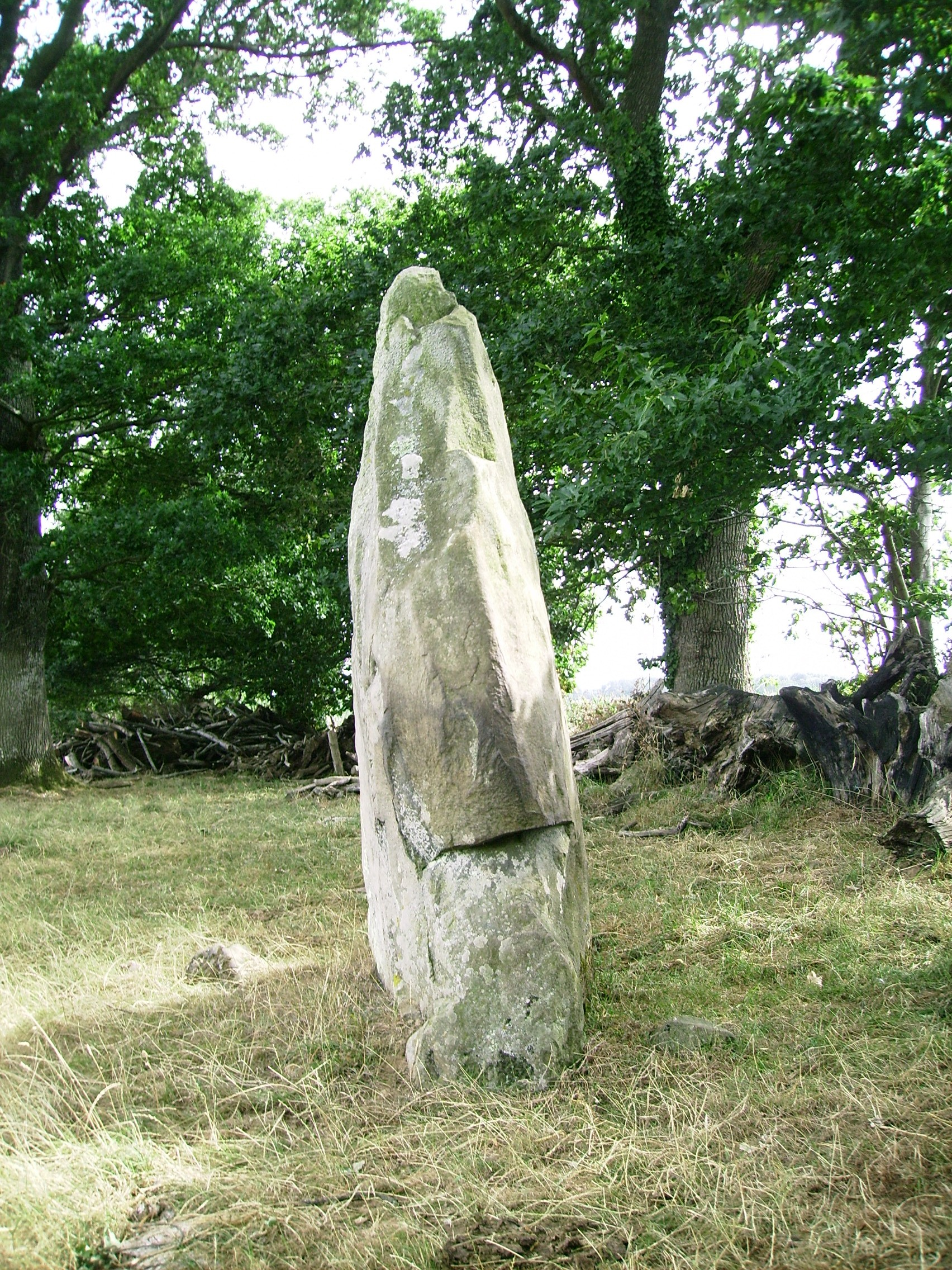
- The Menhir of Saint Civière, in Le Pas
- Location of Le Pas
- Location within France Location within Pays de la Loire
- Coordinates: 48°25′51″N 0°41′55″W
- Country: France
- Region: Pays de la Loire
- Department: Mayenne
- Arrondissement: Mayenne
- Canton: Gorron

Government
  - Mayor (2020–2026): Magali Launay
- Area^{1}: 21.90 km^{2} (8.46 sq mi)
- Elevation: 95 m (312 ft)
- Highest elevation: 190 m (620 ft)
- Lowest elevation: 98 m (322 ft)
- Population (2023): 517
  - Density: 23.6/km^{2} (61.1/sq mi)
- Time zone: UTC+01:00 (CET)
  - Summer (DST): UTC+02:00 (CEST)
- INSEE/Postal code: 53176 /53300
- ^{1} French Land Register data, which excludes lakes, ponds, glaciers > 1 km^{2} (0.386 sq mi or 247 acres) and river estuaries.

Le Pas (French pronunciation: [lə pa]) is a commune in the Mayenne department in north-western France. Le Pas is a village located in the north of the Department of Mayenne. It is 10 km from Gorron, 42 km from Laval and 18 km from Mayenne.

The village was liberated by American soldiers on 6 August 1944; a fact which is recorded at the war memorial.

== Geography ==
The river Varenne flows through the commune.

== Sites of interest ==
The menhir of Saint-Civière is an historic monument.

The church of St. Martin, was dedicated on October 8, 1787, and has two bells named Renee and Magdelaine.

== See also ==
- Communes of Mayenne
