= Saint-Mars-sur-Colmont =

- Commune
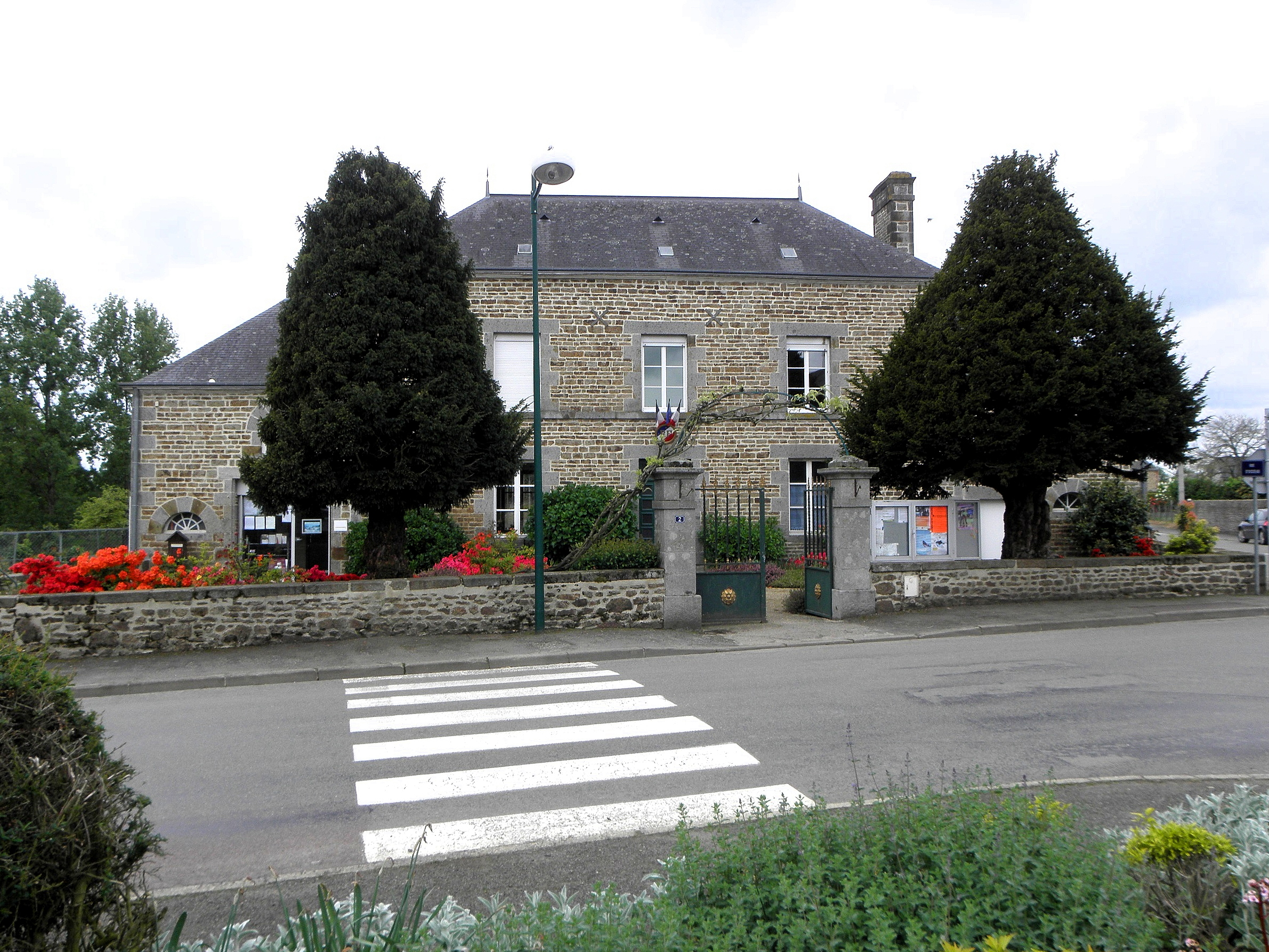
- Saint-Mars-sur-Colmont Town Hall

- Coat of arms
- Location of Saint-Mars-sur-Colmont
- Location within France Location within Pays de la Loire
- Coordinates: 48°22′33″N 0°41′47″W
- Country: France
- Region: Pays de la Loire
- Department: Mayenne
- Arrondissement: Mayenne
- Canton: Gorron
- Intercommunality: Bocage Mayennais

Government
  - Mayor (2020–2026): Odile Aveneau
- Area^{1}: 16.39 km^{2} (6.33 sq mi)
- Elevation: 170 m (560 ft)
- Highest elevation: 202 m (663 ft)
- Lowest elevation: 108 m (354 ft)
- Population (2023): 440
  - Density: 27/km^{2} (70/sq mi)
- Time zone: UTC+01:00 (CET)
  - Summer (DST): UTC+02:00 (CEST)
- INSEE/Postal code: 53237 /53300
- ^{1} French Land Register data, which excludes lakes, ponds, glaciers > 1 km^{2} (0.386 sq mi or 247 acres) and river estuaries.

Saint-Mars-sur-Colmont (French pronunciation: [sɛ̃ maʁ syʁ kɔlmɔ̃], literally Saint-Mars on Colmont) is a commune in the Mayenne department in north-western France. The river Colmont, a tributary of the Mayenne, flows through the commune.

== See also ==
- Communes of the Mayenne department
