= Désertines =

Désertines may refer to the following places in France:

- Désertines, Allier, a commune in the department of Allier
- Désertines, Mayenne, a commune in the department of Mayenne
