= Marian apparition =

Supernatural appearance by Mary, mother of Jesus

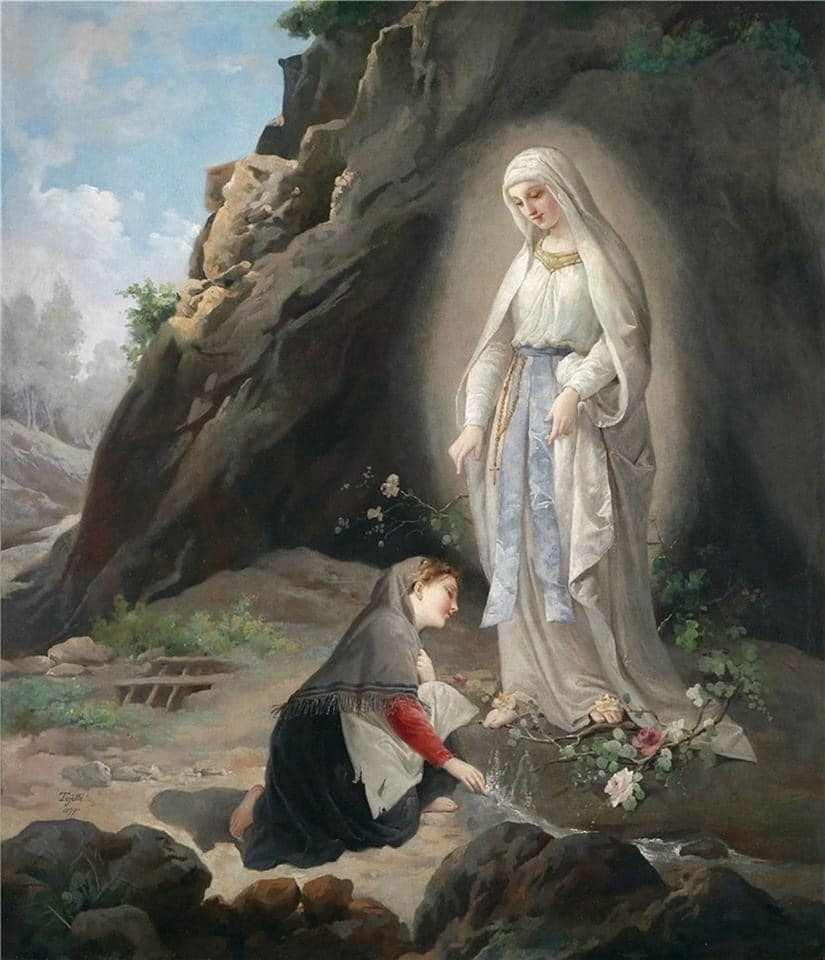
Painting of the apparition of Virgin Mary to Bernadette Soubirous in the Grotto at Massabielle near Lourdes

A Marian apparition is a reported supernatural appearance of Mary, the mother of Jesus. While sometimes described as a type of vision, apparitions are generally regarded as external manifestations, whereas visions are more often understood as internal, spiritual experiences. Throughout history, both Marian apparitions and visions have been associated with religious messages, devotional practices, and pilgrimage traditions.

In the Catholic Church, for a reported appearance to be classified as a Marian apparition, the person or persons who claim to see Mary (the "seers") must claim that they see her visually located in their environment. If the person claims to hear Mary but not see her, this is known as an interior locution, not an apparition. Also excluded from the category of apparitions are dreams, visions experienced in the imagination, the claimed perception of Mary in ordinarily-explainable natural phenomena, and miracles associated with Marian artwork, such as weeping statues.

Believers consider such apparitions to be real and objective interventions of divine power, rather than subjective experiences generated by the perceiving individuals, even in cases where the apparition is reportedly seen by only some, not all, of the people present at the event's location.

Marian apparitions are considered by believers to be expressions of Mary's ongoing motherly care for the church. The understood purpose of each apparition is to draw attention to some aspect of the Christian message, given the needs of a particular time and place. Apparitions are often accompanied by other alleged supernatural phenomena, such as medical cures. However, such miraculous events are not considered the purpose of Marian apparitions, but are alleged to exist primarily to validate and draw attention to the message.

== Examples ==
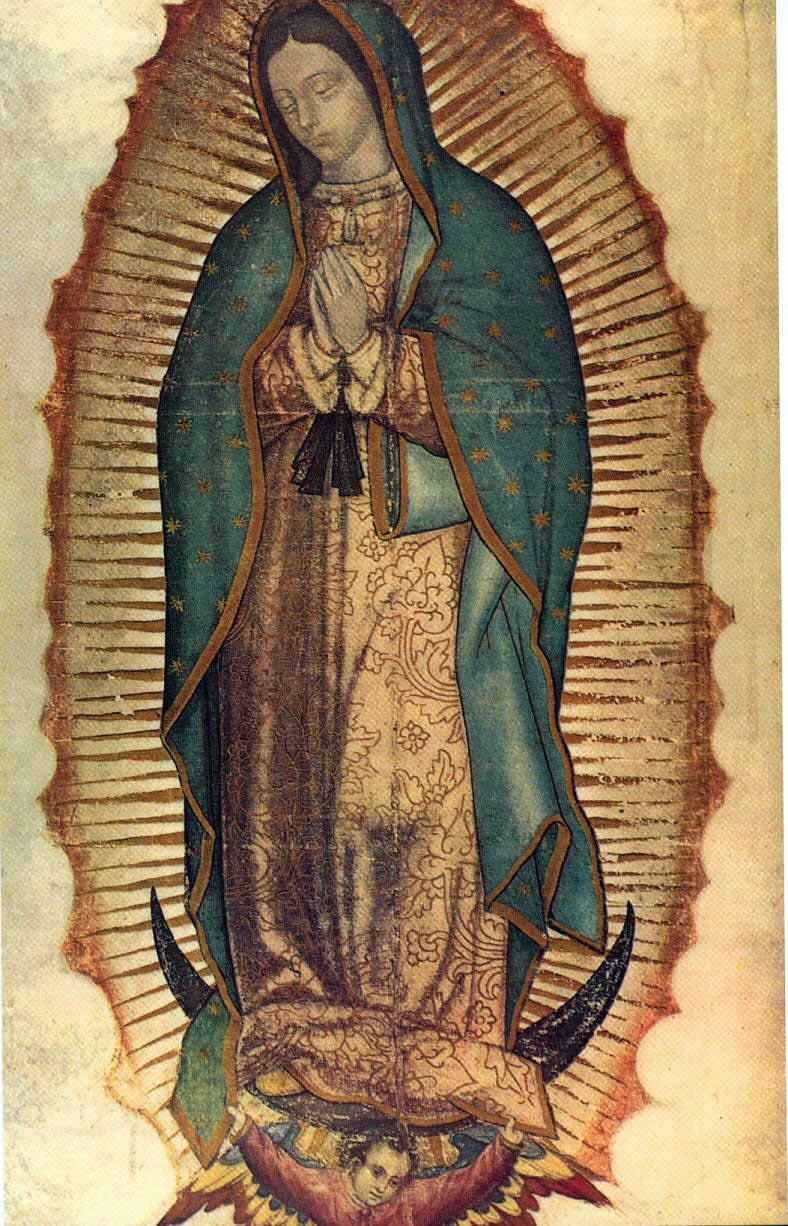
Our Lady of Guadalupe is widely considered integral to the cultural identity of Mexico and Latin American culture

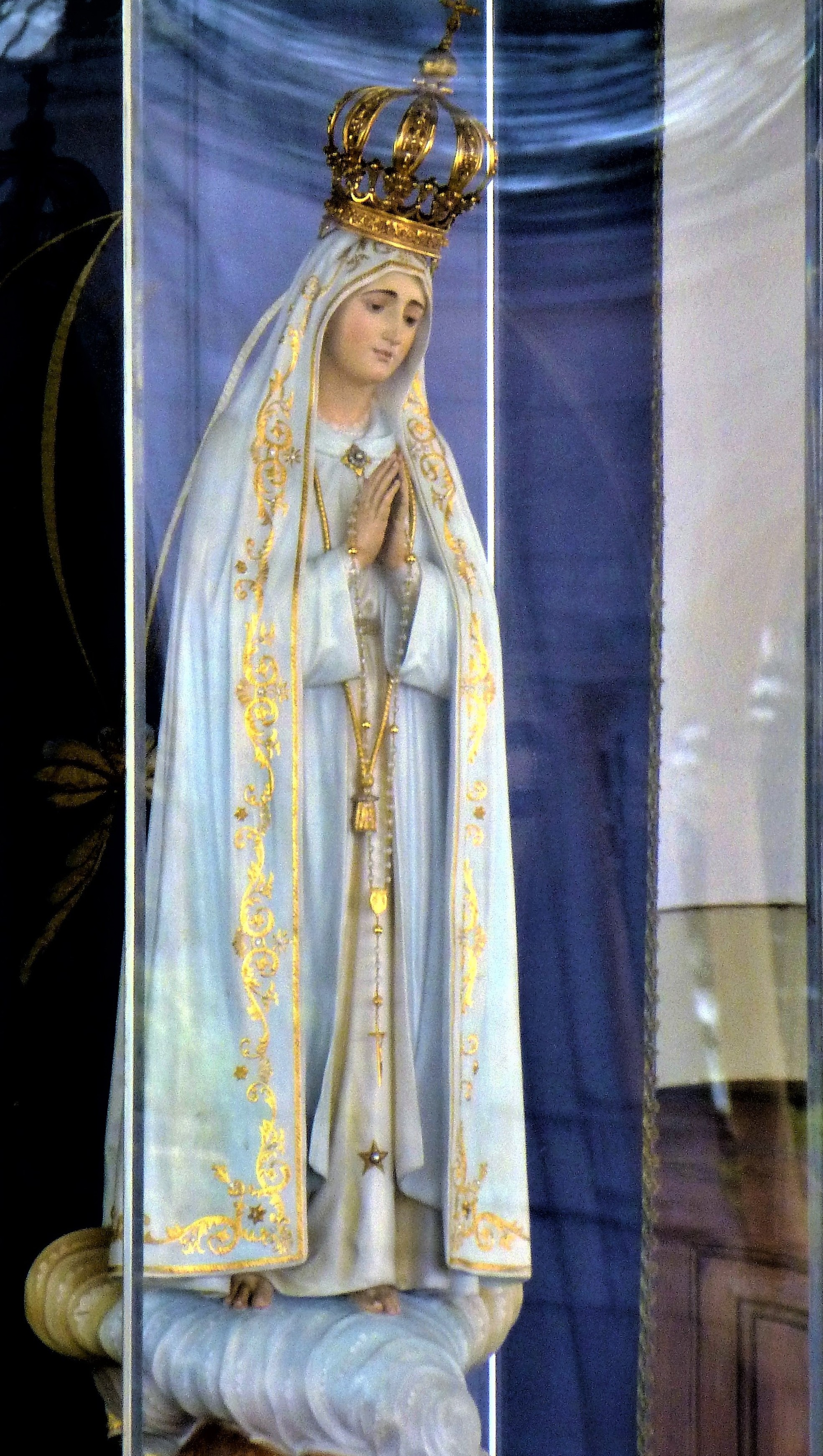
The apparitions of the Virgin Mary in Fátima (Portugal) in 1917 have become one of the most famous Marian events in the world

Some Marian apparitions are associated with one or more titles given to Mary, often based on the location of the apparition, such as Our Lady of Pontmain in Pontmain, France (1871). Others use a title that Mary purportedly applies to herself during the alleged apparition, as in the case of the disputed apparition entitled The Lady of All Nations (Netherlands, 1945 to 1959).

Some Marian apparitions have only one purported seer, such as that of Our Lady of Lourdes (France, 1858). Other apparitions have multiple seers; in the case of Our Lady of Fátima (Portugal, 1917), there were only three seers of the apparition itself, but miraculous phenomena were reported by a crowd of approximately 70,000 people, and even by others located miles away. In other cases, the entirety of a large group of people claims to see Mary, as in the case of Our Lady of La Vang (Vietnam, c. 1800). Some modern mass apparitions, claimed to have been witnessed by hundreds of thousands, such as Our Lady of Zeitoun (Egypt, 1968~1971).

Most alleged apparitions involve the verbal communication of messages, but others are silent, such as the apparition of Our Lady of Knock (Ireland, 1879).

Some apparitions are one-time events, such as Our Lady of La Salette (France, 1846). Others recur over an extended period, such as Our Lady of Laus (France, 17th/18th centuries), whose seer claimed 54 years of appearances. Public, serial apparitions (in which a seer not only says that they have experienced a vision, but that they expect it will recur, causing people to gather to observe) appear to be a relatively recent phenomenon; up until about the seventeenth century, most reported apparitions happened when the individual was alone, or at least no one else was aware of its occurrence.

Physical contact is hardly ever reported as part of Marian apparitions. In rare cases, a physical artifact is reportedly left behind, such as the image of Our Lady of Guadalupe (Mexico, 1531), which is said to have been miraculously imprinted on the cloak of Juan Diego.

== Assessment by the Catholic Church ==
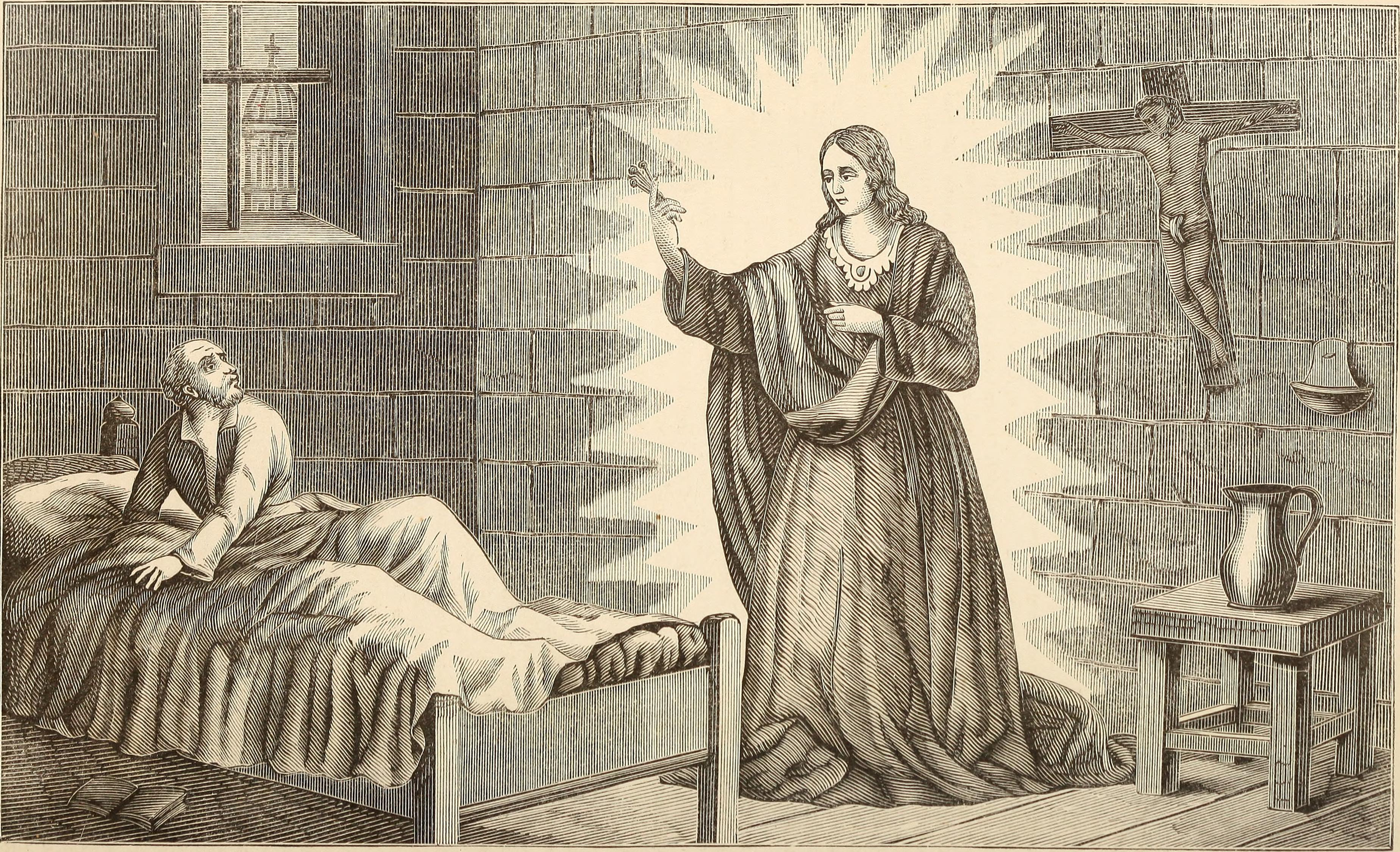
Jetzer being tricked. Jetzer was a Dominican friar in Bern, and some of his brothers tricked him into thinking he was receiving a revelation from the Virgin Mary. Eventually, he realized the truth. As punishment for this scandal, four Dominicans were burned at the stake by order of Pope Julius II with an audience of 30,000 people on May 1, 1509.

The Catholic Church believes that supernatural Marian apparitions can occur, but also believes that many claimed apparitions are fabricated by the seer or the result of something other than divine intervention. For this reason, the Catholic Church has a formal evaluation process established for assessing claimed apparitions.

Occasionally, an ecclesial authority will decide not to investigate the veracity of an apparition in itself but will permit religious practices related to it. Pope Leo XIII, for example, authorized the use of a scapular described in the messages of Our Lady of Pellevoisin (France, 1876), but did not pass judgment on the supernatural character of the apparition itself.

In 1978, the Congregation for the Doctrine of the Faith promulgated investigation guidelines in a document entitled Norms regarding the manner of proceeding in the discernment of presumed apparitions or revelations. The 1978 norms were superseded by new guidelines issued by the Dicastery for the Doctrine of the Faith in May 2024. Investigations into alleged apparitions still ordinarily fall first within the jurisdiction of the local ordinary (i.e. diocesan bishop). The new norms recommend incidents of phenomena should be carefully assessed, to make sure that they are not fraudulent or for monetary gain.

As per the new norms, "[s]ix possible conclusions that can be reached when discerning a possible supernatural phenomenon, ranging from a declaration that an event is not of supernatural origin to authorizing and promoting piety and devotion associated with a phenomenon without affirming its divine nature." The bishop is to submit his findings to the Dicastery for review before publishing them.

Under the new norms, a bishop or national conference will not make a declaration that these phenomena are of supernatural origin, but indicate by a "nihil obstat" (meaning "no objection") that they find no problematic elements with a reported phenomenon. Even if a Catholic bishop sees no objection, belief in the apparition is never required of the Catholic faithful. The Catholic faith is based on so-called Public Revelation, which ended with the death of the last living Apostle. A Marian apparition, however, is considered private revelation, which may emphasize some facet of the received public revelation for a specific purpose but can never add anything new to the deposit of faith.

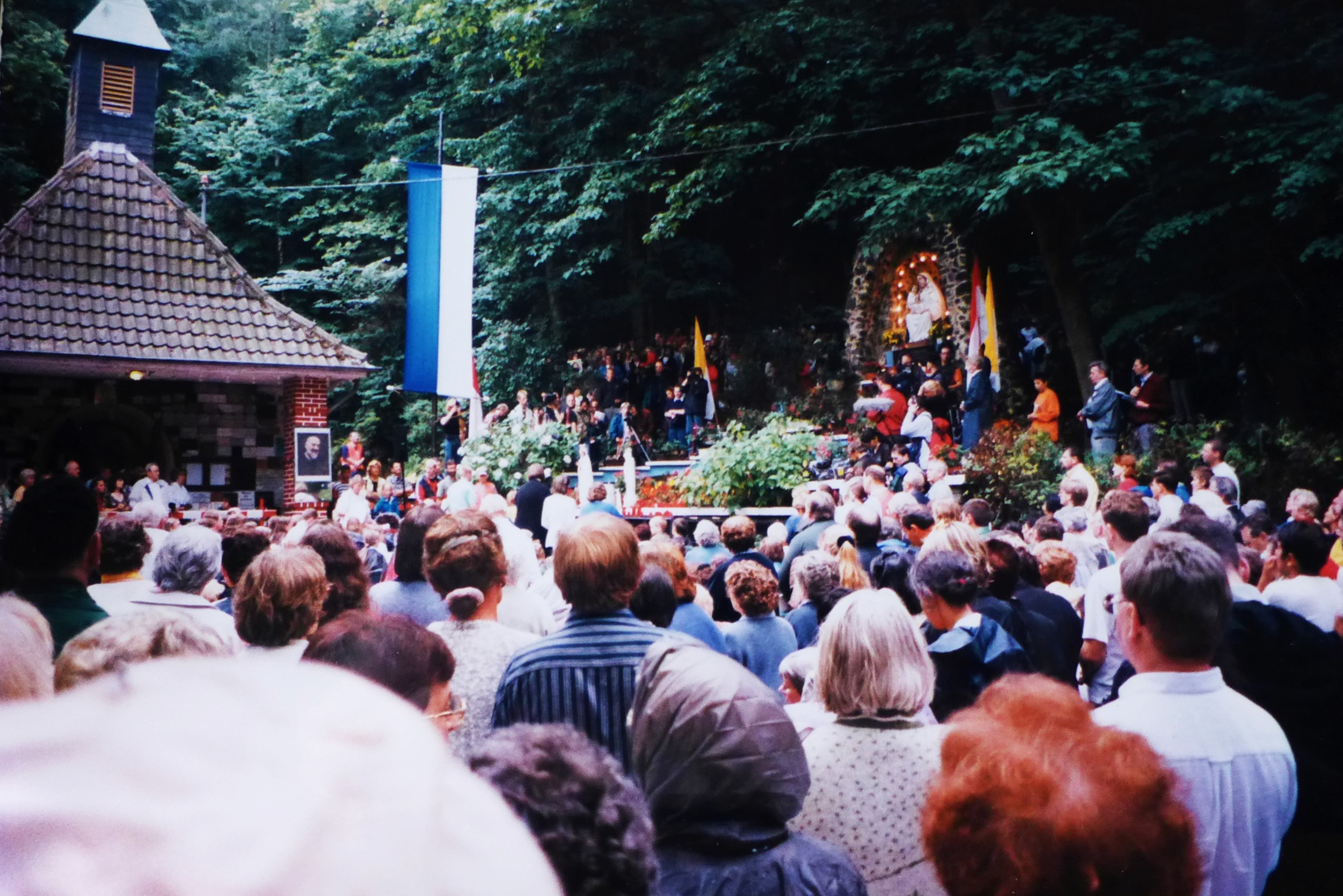
In Marpingen, Germany, Our Lady is said to have appeared several times to three groups of visionaries: in 1876–1877, then in 1934–1936, and in 1999. The investigation performed by the Bishop of Trier after the last apparition concluded in 2005 that "the events in Marpingen cannot be confirmed as being of supernatural origin".

In the Catholic Church, approval of a Marian apparition is relatively rare. The majority of investigated apparitions are rejected as fraudulent or otherwise false. Recently rejected apparition claims include those of "Our Lady of Surbiton", denounced as fraudulent in 2007, and those associated with Holy Love Ministries in Elyria, Ohio, condemned in 2009. Some whose apparition claims are rejected have seceded from the Catholic Church as a result and initiated new groups, as in the case of the Mariavite Church, the Palmarian Catholic Church, and the Fraternité Notre-Dame.

== Cultural impact ==
In many cases, apparition seers report a request from Mary for the construction of a shrine on the place of the apparition. Such Marian shrines often become popular sites of Christian pilgrimage. The most-visited Marian shrine in the world is the Basilica of Our Lady of Guadalupe in Mexico City, which draws 10 million pilgrims each year. Other popular apparition-related Marian pilgrimage sites include the Sanctuary of Our Lady of Fátima in Portugal (6–8 million per year) and the Sanctuary of Our Lady of Lourdes in France (1.5 million annually).

"When Marian apparitions occur, Mary addresses those who see her in their native language, and often promulgates a particular image of herself that incorporates elements of the local culture." Apparitions can become a part of national identity, as Our Lady of Guadalupe is for the majority-Catholic population of Mexico. She is depicted in telenovelas (soap operas), and her image is commonly seen on objects such as magnets and t-shirts in Mexico. Mexican immigrants to the United States have also brought these cultural elements with them, and she's prominently featured in murals and other works of art in cities with a large Mexican population across the US, such as San Antonio, Texas, and Los Angeles, California. Our Lady of Knock is the most common depiction of Mary in Ireland.

Apparitions often result in the establishment of Marian confraternities, movements, and societies that seek to heed and spread the messages of a particular apparition, such as the Blue Army of Our Lady of Fátima.

Occasionally, apparitions will introduce prayers that become incorporated into widespread Catholic practice, as for the case of the Fátima prayers, or the legendary revelation of the Rosary to Saint Dominic.

== Political impact ==
In late 1870s Germany, Prussian liberals criticized pilgrimages to Marian sites, contending that these pilgrimages were superstition and an activity of the "credulous, bigoted masses".

Marian apparitions have held significant importance during wartime and periods of political change.

In Italy, Mary would become both an important religious figure and her image would be used by the church and political parties. In 1948, an election was held for the parliament of the Italian Republic; this election was between the Christian Democrats and the Popular Front. The Christian Democrats, with the support of Pope Pius XII, portrayed the election as voting for Christ or against Christ to maintain power. During this era, there was an increased number of Marian Apparitions occurring throughout France, such as viewers seeing her appear atop a church. While some leftists claimed these were orchestrated by the church, they ultimately swayed the public towards reinstating the Christian Democrats.

In Eastern Europe, conflicts between the Ukrainian government and those that identified as Transcarpathian arose in the Carpathian Mountains in the Western Ukraine region. Dzhublyk has been the site of various Marian apparitions. Halemba argues that Marian apparitions commonly become resources to challenge and restructure existing social and political structures. At Dzhublyk, during one of the first Marian apparitions the viewer claimed that Mary said her mission was to reinstate the church’s power and unite the people with each other within the church. The visionaries, Marianka and Olenka who saw the Marian Apparition at Dzhublyk, would communicate Mary's wishes to the priest managers, who would then share the message for them. Dzhublyk, like the site of other Marian apparitions, became a booming pilgrimage site and a church was constructed in her honor. The town has seen significant economic growth since the first sightings in 2002.

Between 1937 and 1940, a group of young girls in Heede, Germany reported seeing Marian apparitions over 100 times in total, during which she warned against secularization. Conflicts between German citizens, church officials, and the government began to rise. Mystics like Therese Neumann who claimed to have Marian apparitions were at risk of excommunication and legal prosecution. The Nazi regime viewed Catholicism as a deviation from their authority and persecuted and killed various German priests and nuns, particularly those that resisted against Nazi control. Marian apparitions also increased significantly following World War II, with up to 14 apparitions being reported each year between 1945 and 1954. Following the downfall of Nazism, apparitions in Heroldsbach and Fehrbach became common. In 1950, during a Marian apparition, the viewers claimed that disobeying her wishes would lead to Russia invading Germany and bringing "starvation with them".
