= Our Lady of Pontmain =

1871 Marian apparition

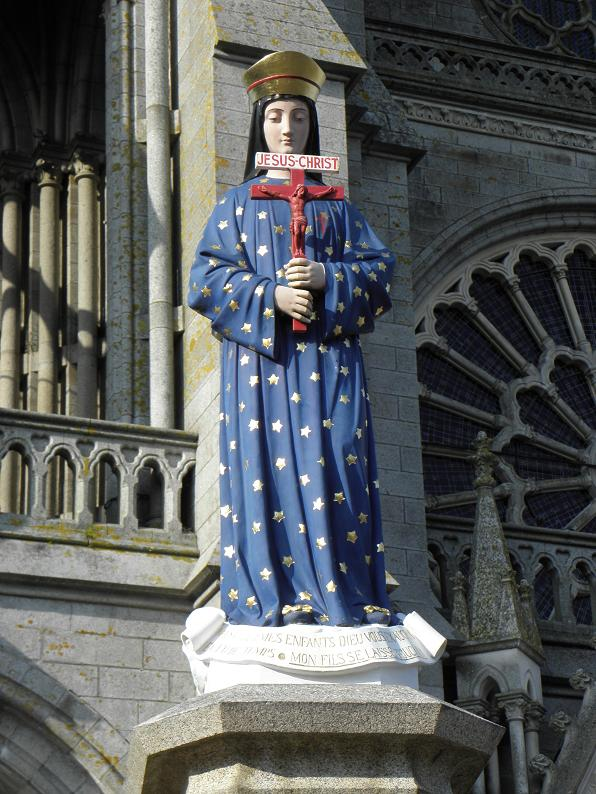
- Notre-Dame d'Esperance de Pontmain
- Location: Pontmain, France
- Date: 17 January 1871
- Type: Marian apparition
- Approval: February 2, 1872; Bishop Casimir Wicart; Diocese of Laval
- Shrine: Basilica of Our Lady of Hope of Pontmain
- Patronage: Pontmain, France, hope

Our Lady of Pontmain, also known as Our Lady of Hope, is the title given to the Virgin Mary following her apparition at Pontmain, France on 17 January 1871.

== The Apparition ==
The Franco-Prussian War (also called the War of 1870) was the culmination of years of tension between the two nations, which finally came to a head on 19 July 1870, when Emperor Napoleon III of the Second Empire declared war against Prussia. From the first days of the war, defeat followed defeat. By January 1871, Paris was under siege, and two-thirds of the country was under the advancing Prussians.

The apparition is said to have occurred at the height of the war. Pontmain, a hamlet of about 500 inhabitants, lay between the oncoming Prussian army and the city of Laval. The local Barbedette family consisted of father César, his wife, Victoire, their two sons Joseph and Eugène, aged ten and twelve, and another older boy who was away in the army. On the evening of 17 January 1871, the two boys were helping their father in the barn when the elder, Eugène, walked over towards the door to look out. As he gazed at the star-studded sky, he suddenly saw an apparition of a beautiful woman smiling at him; she was wearing a blue gown covered with golden stars, and a black veil under a golden crown.

His father, brother, and a neighbour came out to look and Joseph immediately said he too could see the apparition although the adults saw nothing. The mother, Victoire, came out but she too could see nothing. The boys’ parents could not see what their children were seeing that night and called for Sister Vitaline, the local schoolteacher. She, like the boys’ parents, could also not see the apparition, and called for two girls, Françoise Richer and Jeanne-Marie Lebosse, aged nine and eleven, respectively. Sister Vitaline suggested that perhaps Our Lady was visible only to the children. Without any prior knowledge of the apparition, the girls looked into the night sky and began describing the vision in exactly the same detail as the Barbedette boys did.

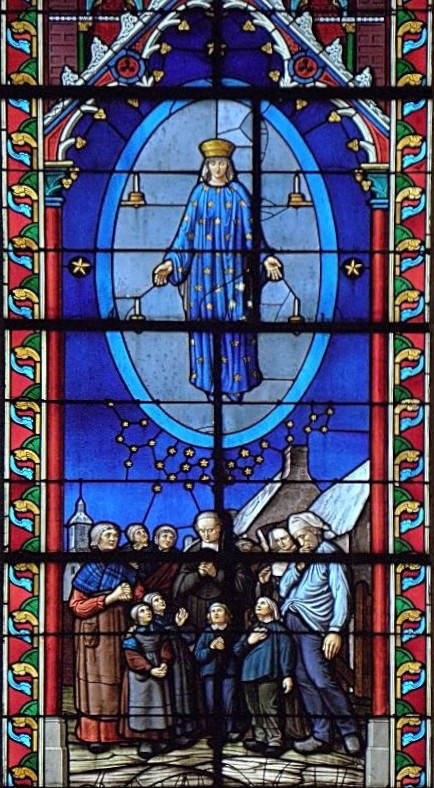
Notre-Dame d'Esperance de Pontmain

A crowd gathered to pray as word quickly spread among the anxious villagers. Children saw the beautiful Lady, and gleefully pointed up to her. Adults, however, only saw three stars forming a triangle. As they prayed the Rosary, the children saw the garment's stars multiply until it was almost entirely gold. Next, the children saw a banner unfurl beneath the Lady. Slowly, a message appeared:

But pray, my children. God will hear you in time. My Son allows Himself to be touched.

Upon hearing the message read aloud, the crowd spontaneously began the hymn "Mother of Hope". As they sang, the Lady laughed and joined in the singing.

The children squealed with delight as her hands kept time with the music. When the crowd began "My Sweet Jesus," her expression changed to profound sadness and a red crucifix appeared in her hands, with the words "Jesus Christ" above it. Her eyes mournfully contemplated the crucifix during the hymn. As the people sang "Ave Maris Stella", the crucifix vanished and her smile returned, though with a touch of melancholy. Two small white crosses then appeared on her shoulders before the Lady disappeared behind a cloud. As the night's prayers came to a close, the apparition ended. It was about nine o'clock; the phenomenon had lasted about three hours.

=== Description of the Lady ===
Years later, Joseph Barbadette, who later became a priest of the Congregation of the Oblates of Mary Immaculate, recounted:

She was young and tall of stature, clad in a garment of deep blue, ... Her dress was covered with brilliant gold stars. The sleeves were ample and long. She wore slippers of the same blue as the dress, ornamented with gold bows. On the head was a black veil half covering the forehead, concealing the hair and ears, and falling over the shoulders. Above this was a crown resembling a diadem, higher in front than elsewhere, and widening out at the sides. A red line encircled the crown at the middle. Her hands were small and extended toward us as in the 'Miraculous Medal.' Her face had the most exquisite delicacy and a smile of ineffable sweetness. The eyes, of unutterable tenderness, were fixed on us. Like a true mother, she seemed happier in looking at us than we in contemplating.

=== After the apparition ===
That same evening, Prussian forces inexplicably abandoned their advance. General von Schmidt of the Prussian Army, who was about to move on the city of Laval towards Pontmain, received orders from his commander not to take the city.

On the evening of 17 January 1871, the Commander of the Prussian forces, having taken up his quarters at the archiepiscopal palace of Le Mans, told Charles-Jean Fillion, bishop of that diocese:

"By this time my troops are at Laval".

On the same evening, the Prussian troops in sight of Laval stopped at half-past five o'clock, about the time when the apparition first appeared above Pontmain, a few miles away. General Schmidt is reported to have said on the morning of the 18th:

"We cannot go farther. Yonder, in the direction of Brittany, there is an invisible 'Madonna' barring the way."

The sudden stopping of the Prussian forces in sight of Laval, and their retirement the following morning, meant, together with the saving of Brittany, the turning back of the tide of conquering soldiery from that part of France. The war was practically at an end. On 23 January 1871, the long-hoped for armistice was signed. Soon, all thirty-eight conscripted men and boys returned home unscathed.

== Authorization of Our Lady of Hope ==
After that the devotion to the Blessed Virgin under the title of that of Notre Dame d'Esperance de Pontmain, "Our Lady of Hope of Pontmain", was authorized by ecclesiastical authorities, and the confraternity of that name has been extended all over the world.

After the apparition of "Our Lady of Hope" on 17 January 1871, pilgrims made up of both the clergy and the laity came to Pontmain. At the same time, inquiries and investigations were made about the apparition; the visionary children were submitted to various intense interrogations. Finally, on the Feast of the Purification, 2 February 1872, Casimir-Alexis-Joseph Wicart, Bishop of Laval, issued a pastoral letter giving canonical judgment on the apparition. Thus, the veneration of Our Lady of Hope of Pontmain was given official church recognition and approval.

Joseph Barbadette became a priest of the Congregation of the Oblates of Mary Immaculate; his brother Eugène became a secular priest. His housekeeper was one of the girls who had seen the apparition with him, and the other, Jeanne-Marie Lebossé, became a nun.

== Veneration ==
In May 1872, Wicart authorized the construction of a shrine, which was consecrated in October 1900. In 1905, Pope Pius X elevated the Sanctuary to the status of a minor basilica.

Pope Pius XI gave a final decision regarding the Mass and Office in honor of Our Lady of Hope of Pontmain. A final papal honour was given to Our Lady of Hope on 16 July 1932 by Cardinal Pacelli, who later became Pope Pius XII, by passing a decree from the Chapter of St. Peter's Basilica that the statue of the Blessed Lady, Mother of Hope, be solemnly honoured with the crown of gold. The Lady then was crowned in the presence of bishops, priests, and the laity by Cardinal Verdier, Archbishop of Paris on 24 July 1934. During the Second World War, Our Lady of Pontmain was prayed to in the hope that she would bring peace in France.

The message of the Marian apparition was one of prayer and hope in response to the threat of war and invasion. A place of pilgrimage, it attracts annually around 200,000 drawn from among the people of the region, with some international pilgrimages, especially from Germany.

Notre-Dame-de-Pontmain, Quebec is a municipality in Canada that was named after the apparition. Our Lady of Hope is a parish of the Roman Catholic Diocese of Sault Sainte Marie in Sudbury, Ontario, Canada. There is a chapel dedicated to Our Lady of Hope of Pontmain at the National Shrine of the Immaculate Conception in Washington, D.C. Funds for this chapel were donated by Bob Hope and his wife Dolores.

== See also ==
- Marian apparitions
- Our Lady of Hope Regional School
