= Pontmain =

- Commune
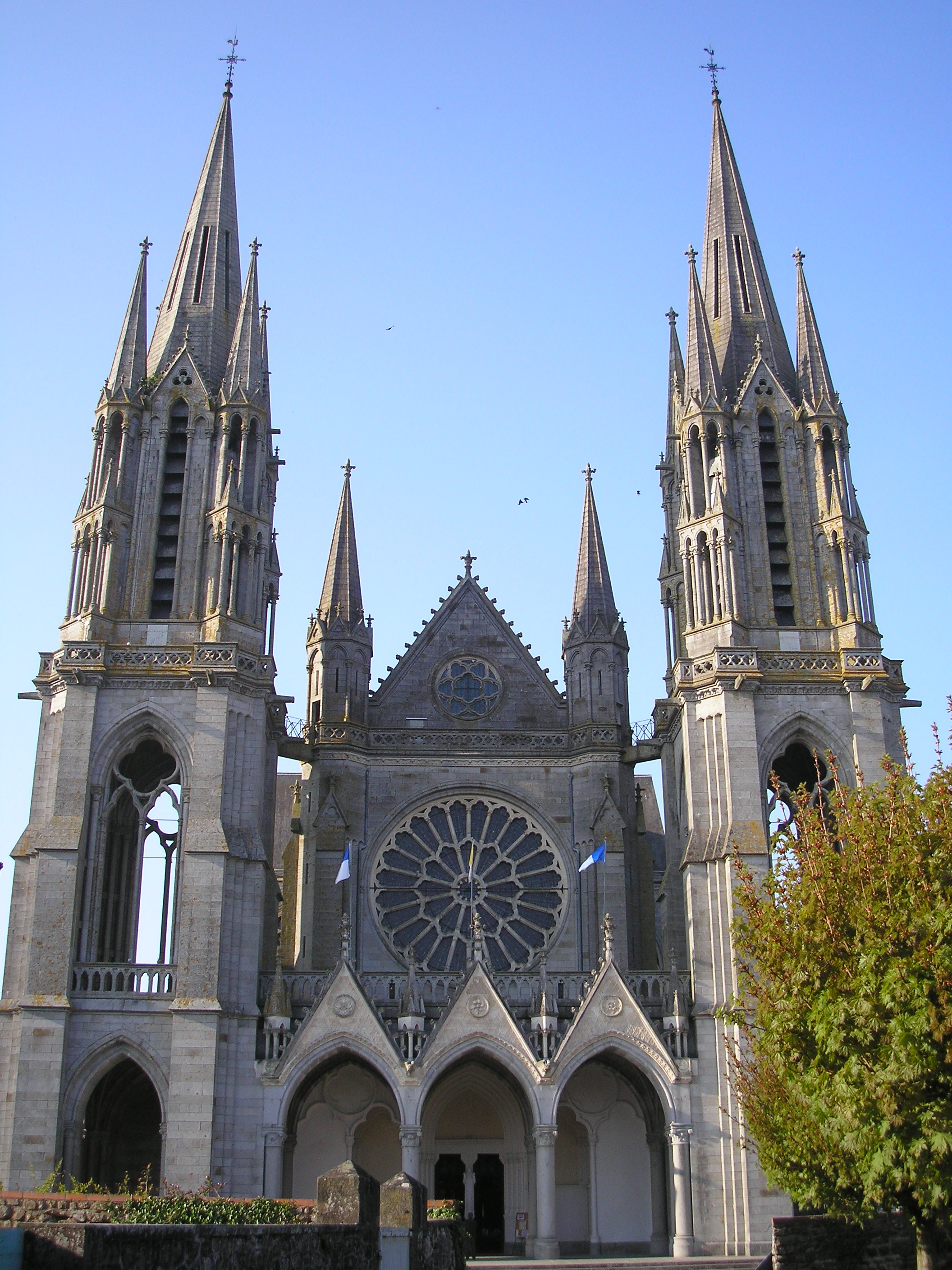
- The basilica of Our Lady of Pontmain

- Coat of arms
- Location of Pontmain
- Location within France Location within Pays de la Loire
- Coordinates: 48°26′22″N 1°03′26″W
- Country: France
- Region: Pays de la Loire
- Department: Mayenne
- Arrondissement: Mayenne
- Canton: Gorron

Government
  - Mayor (2020–2026): Marie-Antoinette Guesdon
- Area^{1}: 7.17 km^{2} (2.77 sq mi)
- Elevation: 180 m (590 ft)
- Highest elevation: 210 m (690 ft)
- Lowest elevation: 134 m (440 ft)
- Population (2023): 809
  - Density: 113/km^{2} (292/sq mi)
- Time zone: UTC+01:00 (CET)
  - Summer (DST): UTC+02:00 (CEST)
- INSEE/Postal code: 53181 /53220
- ^{1} French Land Register data, which excludes lakes, ponds, glaciers > 1 km^{2} (0.386 sq mi or 247 acres) and river estuaries.

Pontmain (French pronunciation: [pɔ̃mɛ̃]) is a commune in the Mayenne department in north-western France.

== History ==
On 17 January 1871, some children from the village claimed to see an apparition of the Virgin Mary in the sky. On 2 February 1872 Mgr. Wicart, bishop of Laval, recognised the apparition. :

Nous jugeons que l'Immaculée Vierge Marie, Mère de Dieu a véritablement apparu, le 17 janvier 1871, à Eugène Barbedette, Joseph Barbedette, Françoise Richer et Jeanne-Marie Lebossé, dans le hameau de Pontmain.

We judge that the immaculate Virgin Mary, mother of God has veritably appeared, on 17 January 1871, to Eugène Barbedette, Joseph Barbedette, Françoise Richer and Jeanne-Marie Lebossé, in the hamlet of Pontmain.

A new church was built in the commune after this apparition between 1873 and 1877. It was erected with a basilica by Pope Pius X in 1908. During World War I, a concentration camp existed in Pontmain. This camp was reserved for civil inmates who lived there with families. In the camp were inmates from Austria, Alsace, Lorraine, Belgium, Luxembourg, Ottoman Empire etc. On 1 July 1972, the municipalities of Saint-Ellier-du-Maine and Saint-Mars-sur-la-Futais was associated with Pontmain. This association was dissolved on 1 January 1983.

=== The railroad ===
Pontmain was served by the departmental railroad line connecting Laval to Landivy. This line was opened on 18 December 1901. Its closure was decided by the county council on 22 May 1938.

== See also ==
- Our Lady of Pontmain
- Communes of Mayenne

== Illustrations ==
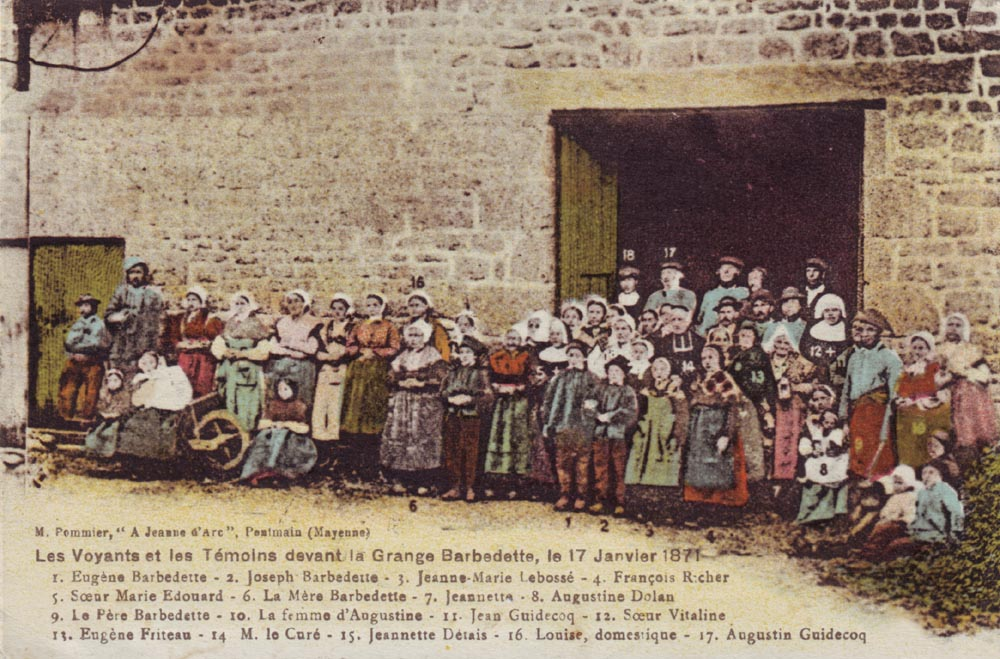
Witness of the apparition in 1871

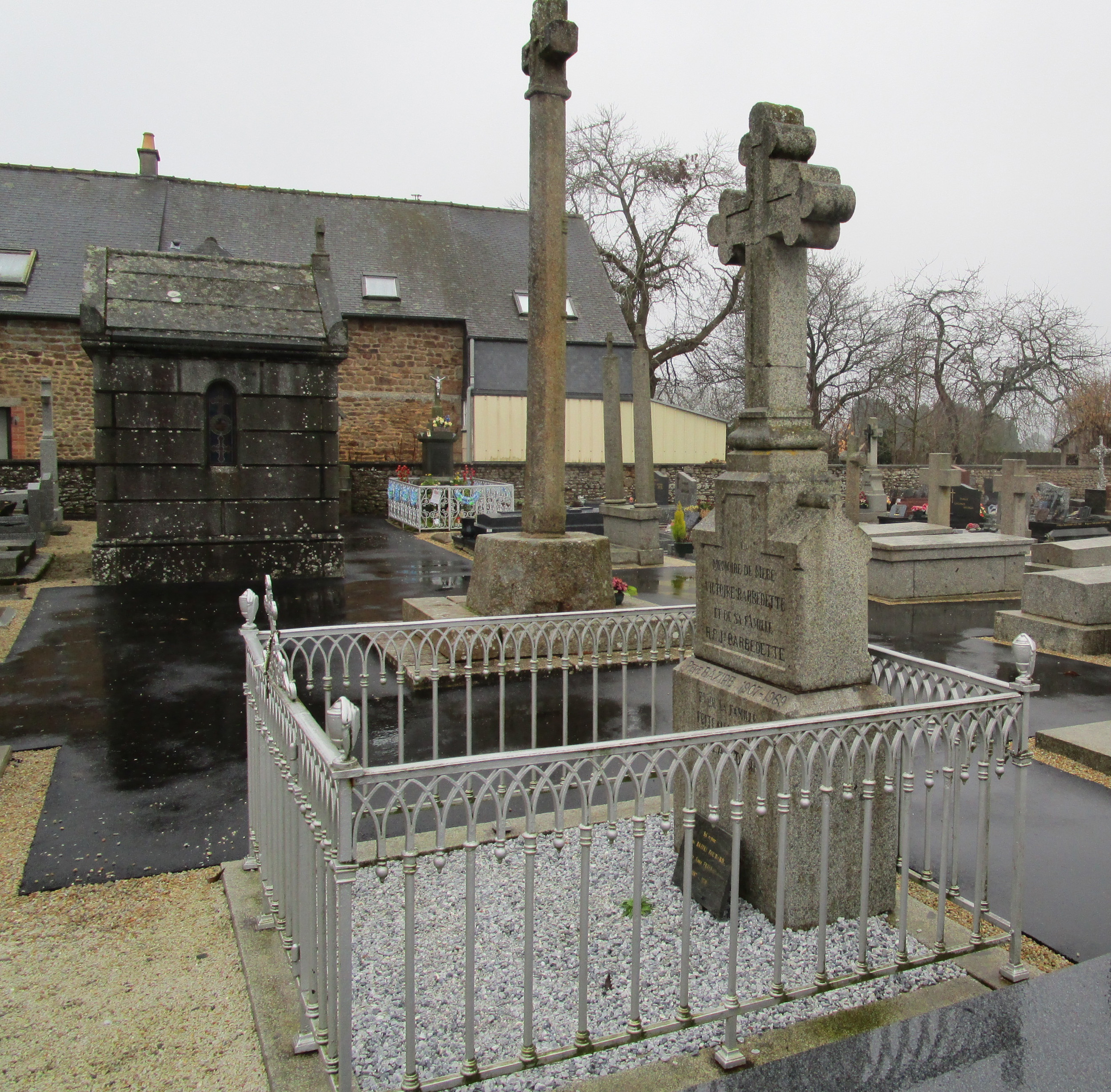
Remembering of Barbedette family and abbot's Cuérin tomb (center)
