= Hercé =

- Commune
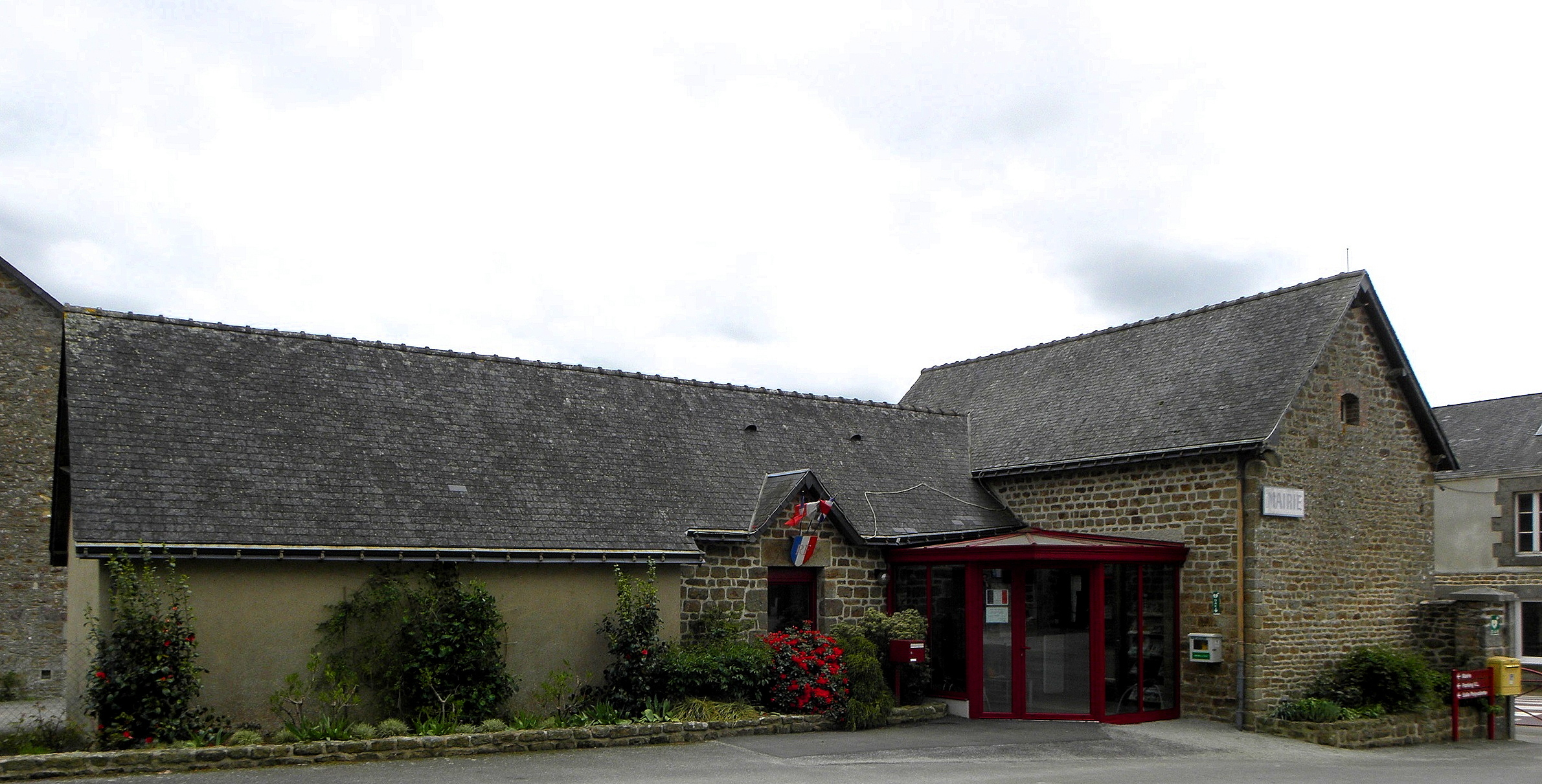
- Town hall

- Coat of arms
- Location of Hercé
- Location within France Location within Pays de la Loire
- Coordinates: 48°25′07″N 0°51′07″W
- Country: France
- Region: Pays de la Loire
- Department: Mayenne
- Arrondissement: Mayenne
- Canton: Gorron

Government
  - Mayor (2020–2026): Christian Lecherbault
- Area^{1}: 10.20 km^{2} (3.94 sq mi)
- Elevation: 180 m (590 ft)
- Highest elevation: 242 m (794 ft)
- Lowest elevation: 154 m (505 ft)
- Population (2023): 297
  - Density: 29.1/km^{2} (75.4/sq mi)
- Time zone: UTC+01:00 (CET)
  - Summer (DST): UTC+02:00 (CEST)
- INSEE/Postal code: 53115 /53120
- ^{1} French Land Register data, which excludes lakes, ponds, glaciers > 1 km^{2} (0.386 sq mi or 247 acres) and river estuaries.

Hercé (French pronunciation: [ɛʁse]) is a commune in the Mayenne department in north-western France.

== See also ==
- Communes of the Mayenne department
