= Saint-Aubin-Fosse-Louvain =

- Commune
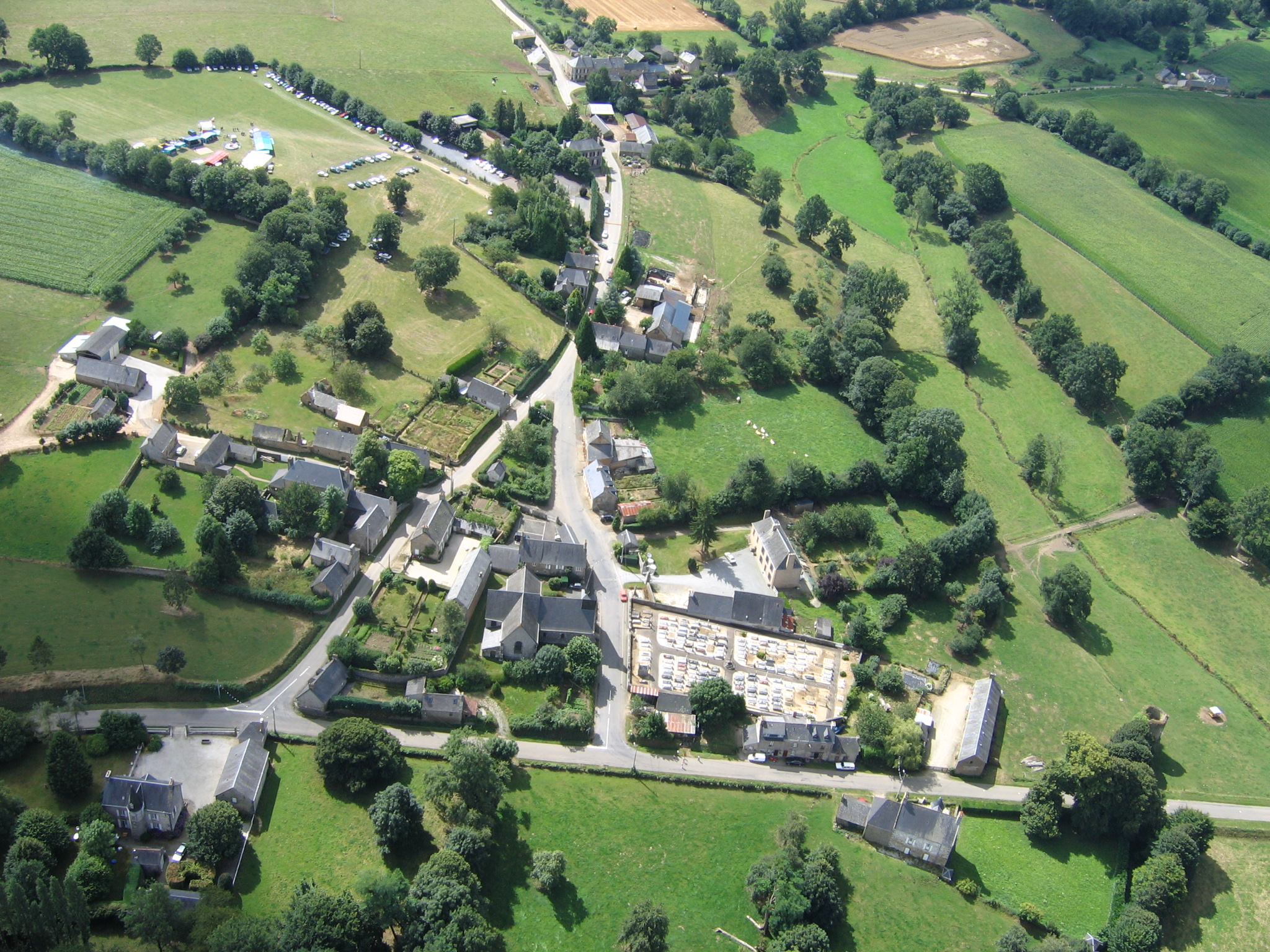
- An aerial view of Saint-Aubin-Fosse-Louvain
- Location of Saint-Aubin-Fosse-Louvain
- Location within France Location within Pays de la Loire
- Coordinates: 48°27′54″N 0°49′48″W
- Country: France
- Region: Pays de la Loire
- Department: Mayenne
- Arrondissement: Mayenne
- Canton: Gorron
- Intercommunality: Bocage Mayennais

Government
  - Mayor (2021–2026): Amélie Betton
- Area^{1}: 14.37 km^{2} (5.55 sq mi)
- Elevation: 160 m (520 ft)
- Highest elevation: 207 m (679 ft)
- Lowest elevation: 153 m (502 ft)
- Population (2023): 209
  - Density: 14.5/km^{2} (37.7/sq mi)
- Time zone: UTC+01:00 (CET)
  - Summer (DST): UTC+02:00 (CEST)
- INSEE/Postal code: 53199 /53120
- ^{1} French Land Register data, which excludes lakes, ponds, glaciers > 1 km^{2} (0.386 sq mi or 247 acres) and river estuaries.

Saint-Aubin-Fosse-Louvain (French pronunciation: [sɛ̃.t‿obɛ̃ fɔs luvɛ̃]) is a commune in the Mayenne department in north-western France.

== See also ==
- Communes of Mayenne
