= Vieuvy =

- Commune
- Location of Vieuvy
- Location within France Location within Pays de la Loire
- Coordinates: 48°26′48″N 0°51′45″W
- Country: France
- Region: Pays de la Loire
- Department: Mayenne
- Arrondissement: Mayenne
- Canton: Gorron

Government
  - Mayor (2020–2026): Loïc Cahu
- Area^{1}: 7.11 km^{2} (2.75 sq mi)
- Elevation: 210 m (690 ft)
- Highest elevation: 220 m (720 ft)
- Lowest elevation: 172 m (564 ft)
- Population (2023): 112
  - Density: 15.8/km^{2} (40.8/sq mi)
- Time zone: UTC+01:00 (CET)
  - Summer (DST): UTC+02:00 (CEST)
- INSEE/Postal code: 53270 /53120
- ^{1} French Land Register data, which excludes lakes, ponds, glaciers > 1 km^{2} (0.386 sq mi or 247 acres) and river estuaries.

Vieuvy (French pronunciation: [vjøvi]) is a commune in the Mayenne department in north-western France. The name is derived from its 9th-century name Vetus Vico. The commune's original name is derived from the latin words vetus vicus, which means "old-village" in Latin.

== See also ==
- Communes of the Mayenne department
