= Colombiers-du-Plessis =

- Commune
- Coat of arms
- Location of Colombiers-du-Plessis
- Location within France Location within Pays de la Loire
- Coordinates: 48°23′33″N 0°50′21″W
- Country: France
- Region: Pays de la Loire
- Department: Mayenne
- Arrondissement: Mayenne
- Canton: Gorron

Government
  - Mayor (2020–2026): Édith Divaret
- Area^{1}: 21.97 km^{2} (8.48 sq mi)
- Elevation: 230 m (750 ft)
- Highest elevation: 242 m (794 ft)
- Lowest elevation: 152 m (499 ft)
- Population (2023): 482
  - Density: 21.9/km^{2} (56.8/sq mi)
- Time zone: UTC+01:00 (CET)
  - Summer (DST): UTC+02:00 (CEST)
- INSEE/Postal code: 53071 /53120
- ^{1} French Land Register data, which excludes lakes, ponds, glaciers > 1 km^{2} (0.386 sq mi or 247 acres) and river estuaries.

Colombiers-du-Plessis (French pronunciation: [kɔlɔ̃bje dy plɛsi]) is a commune in the Mayenne department in north-western France.

== See also ==
- Communes of the Mayenne department
