= Montaudin =

- Commune
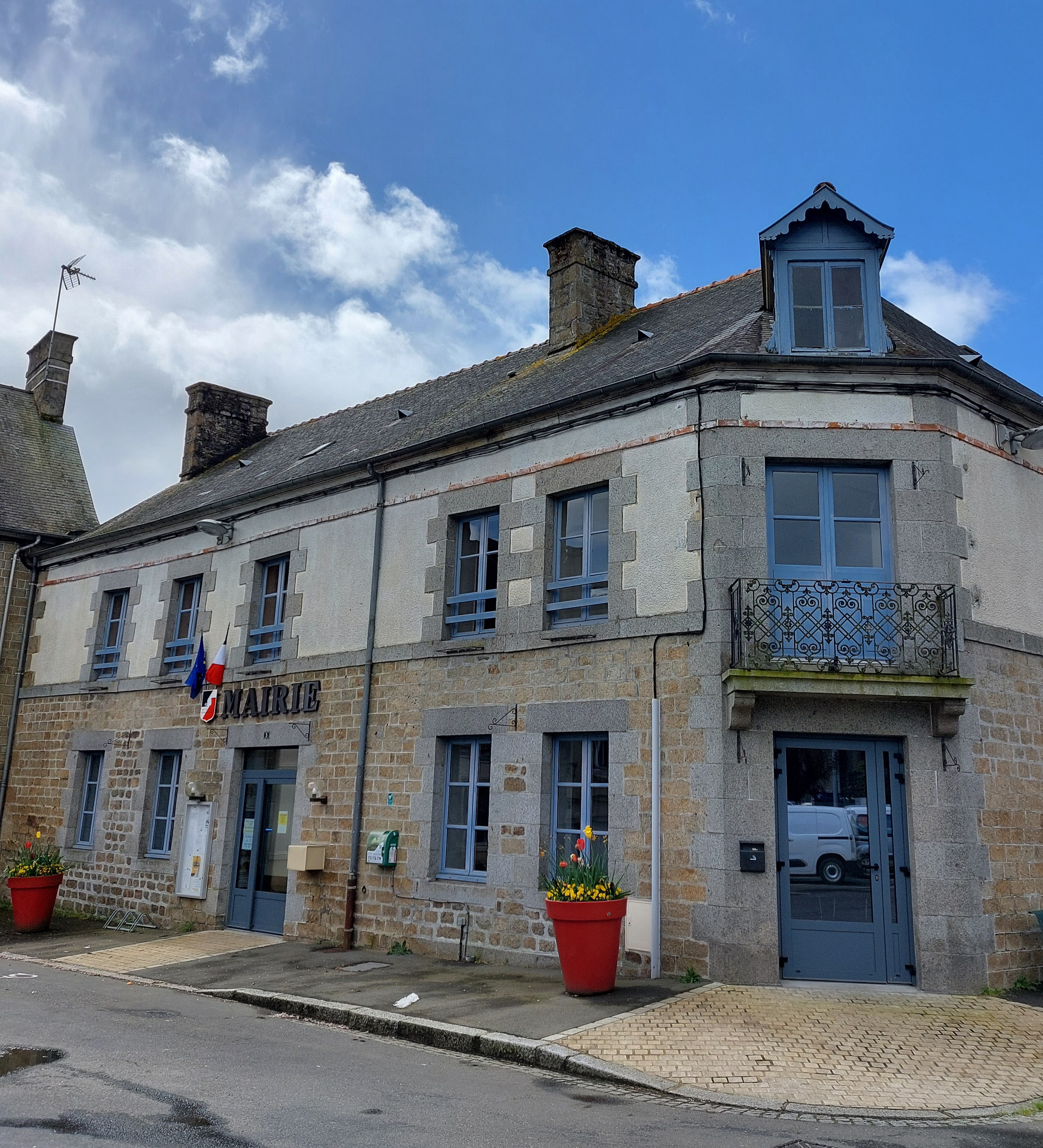
- The town hall of Montaudin
- Location of Montaudin
- Location within France Location within Pays de la Loire
- Coordinates: 48°23′12″N 0°59′14″W
- Country: France
- Region: Pays de la Loire
- Department: Mayenne
- Arrondissement: Mayenne
- Canton: Gorron

Government
  - Mayor (2020–2026): Bernard Ory
- Area^{1}: 21.66 km^{2} (8.36 sq mi)
- Elevation: 206 m (676 ft)
- Highest elevation: 227 m (745 ft)
- Lowest elevation: 150 m (490 ft)
- Population (2023): 879
  - Density: 40.6/km^{2} (105/sq mi)
- Time zone: UTC+01:00 (CET)
  - Summer (DST): UTC+02:00 (CEST)
- INSEE/Postal code: 53154 /53220
- ^{1} French Land Register data, which excludes lakes, ponds, glaciers > 1 km^{2} (0.386 sq mi or 247 acres) and river estuaries.

Montaudin (French pronunciation: [mɔ̃todɛ̃]) is a commune in the Mayenne department in north-western France.

== Gallery ==
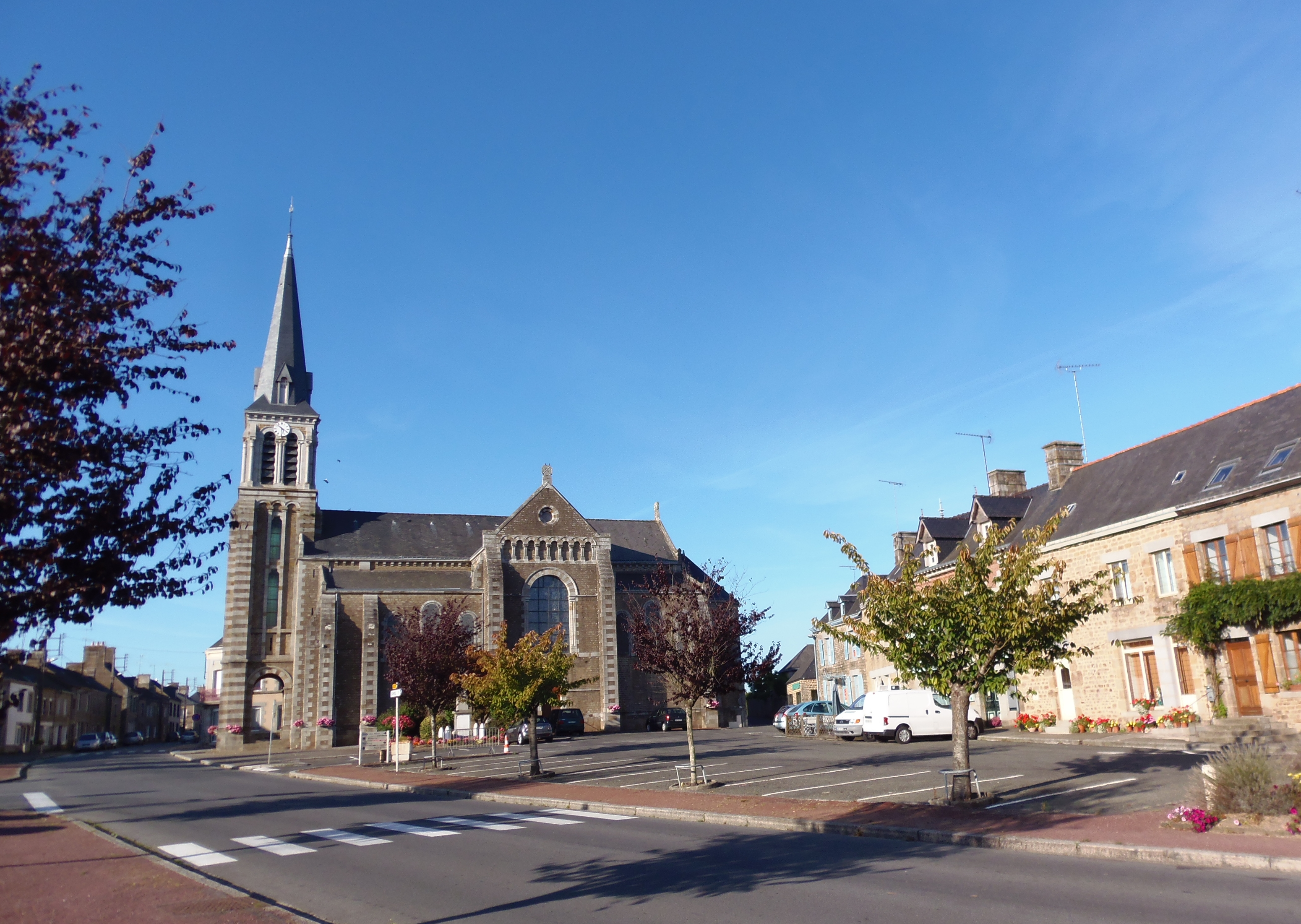
The church of Our Lady, in Montaudin.

== See also ==
- Communes of Mayenne
