= Carelles =

- Commune
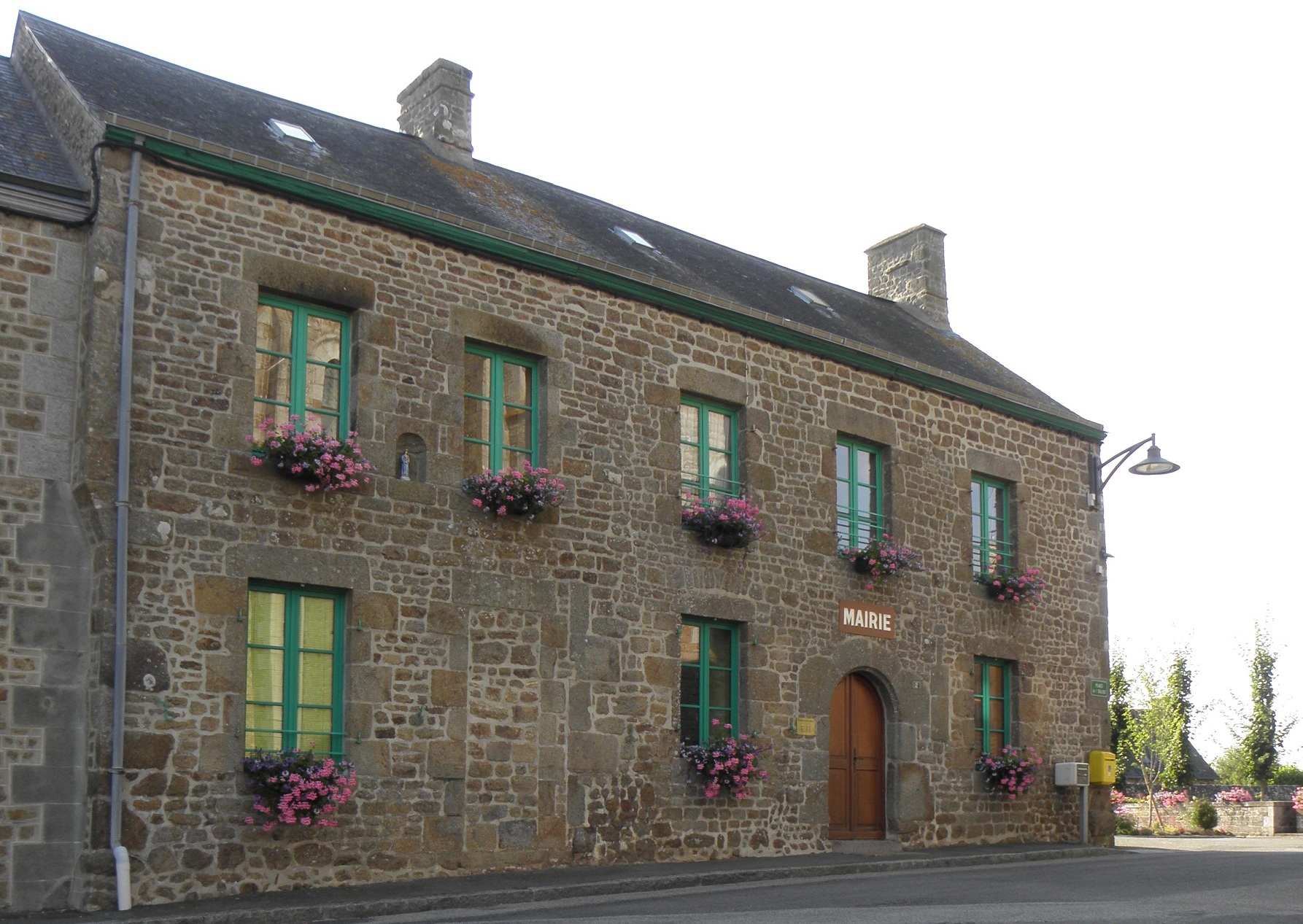
- The town hall in Carelles

- Coat of arms
- Location of Carelles
- Location within France Location within Pays de la Loire
- Coordinates: 48°23′39″N 0°54′13″W
- Country: France
- Region: Pays de la Loire
- Department: Mayenne
- Arrondissement: Mayenne
- Canton: Gorron

Government
  - Mayor (2020–2026): Gérard Brilhault
- Area^{1}: 13.23 km^{2} (5.11 sq mi)
- Elevation: 251 m (823 ft)
- Highest elevation: 255 m (837 ft)
- Lowest elevation: 169 m (554 ft)
- Population (2023): 246
  - Density: 18.6/km^{2} (48.2/sq mi)
- Time zone: UTC+01:00 (CET)
  - Summer (DST): UTC+02:00 (CEST)
- INSEE/Postal code: 53047 /53120
- ^{1} French Land Register data, which excludes lakes, ponds, glaciers > 1 km^{2} (0.386 sq mi or 247 acres) and river estuaries.

Carelles (French pronunciation: [kaʁɛl]) is a commune in the Mayenne department in north-western France.

== See also ==
- Communes of Mayenne
