= Saint-Mars-sur-la-Futaie =

- Commune
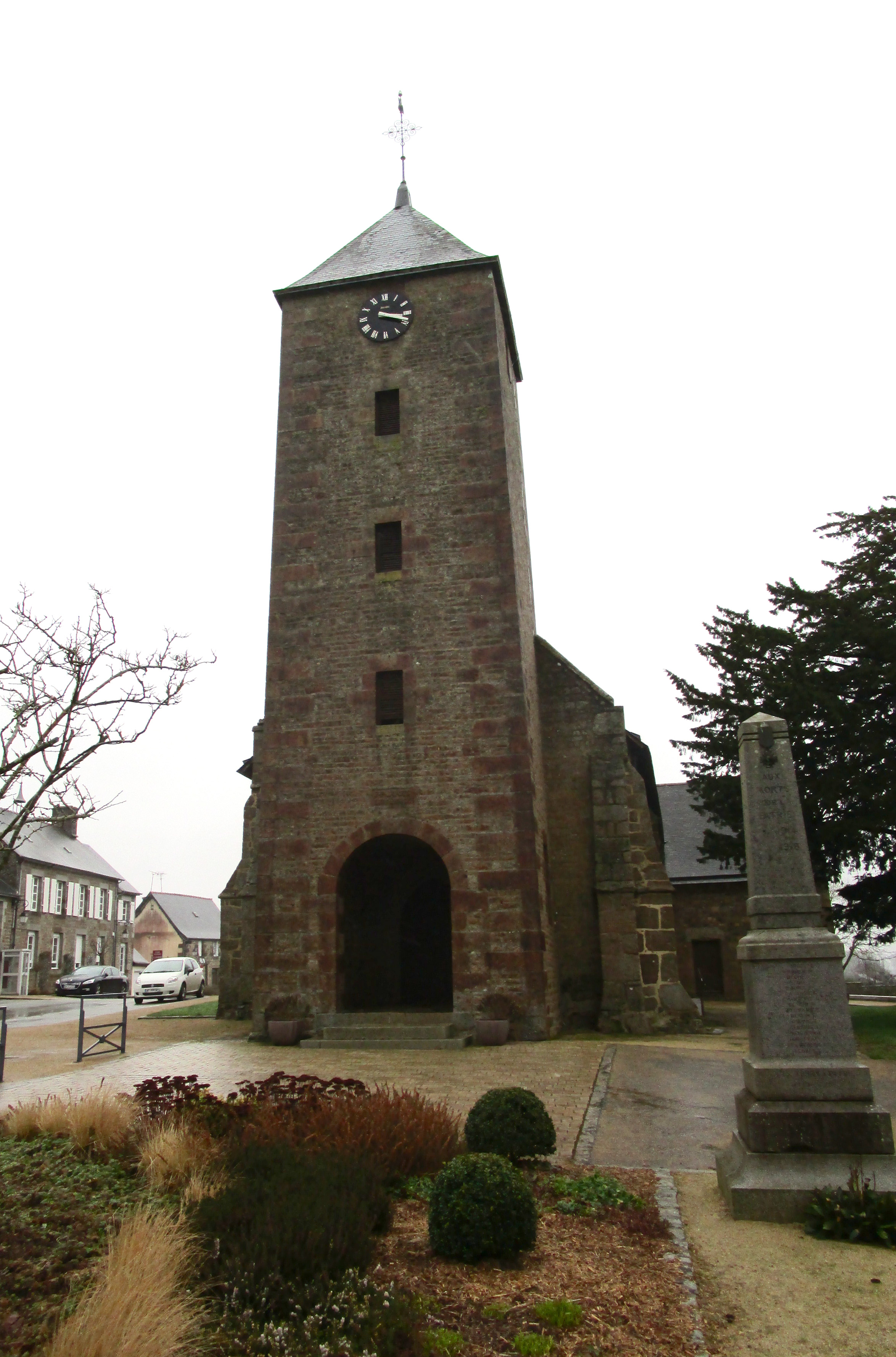
- The bell tower of the church
- Location of Saint-Mars-sur-la-Futaie
- Location within France Location within Pays de la Loire
- Coordinates: 48°25′58″N 1°00′51″W
- Country: France
- Region: Pays de la Loire
- Department: Mayenne
- Arrondissement: Mayenne
- Canton: Gorron
- Intercommunality: Bocage Mayennais

Government
  - Mayor (2020–2026): Maurice Roulette
- Area^{1}: 21.45 km^{2} (8.28 sq mi)
- Elevation: 180 m (590 ft)
- Highest elevation: 252 m (827 ft)
- Lowest elevation: 135 m (443 ft)
- Population (2023): 522
  - Density: 24.3/km^{2} (63.0/sq mi)
- Time zone: UTC+01:00 (CET)
  - Summer (DST): UTC+02:00 (CEST)
- INSEE/Postal code: 53238 /53220
- ^{1} French Land Register data, which excludes lakes, ponds, glaciers > 1 km^{2} (0.386 sq mi or 247 acres) and river estuaries.

Saint-Mars-sur-la-Futaie is a commune in the Mayenne department in north-western France. It is notable as the site of the oldest known tree in France, a Hawthorn growing alongside the church, and reputedly planted in the 3rd century.

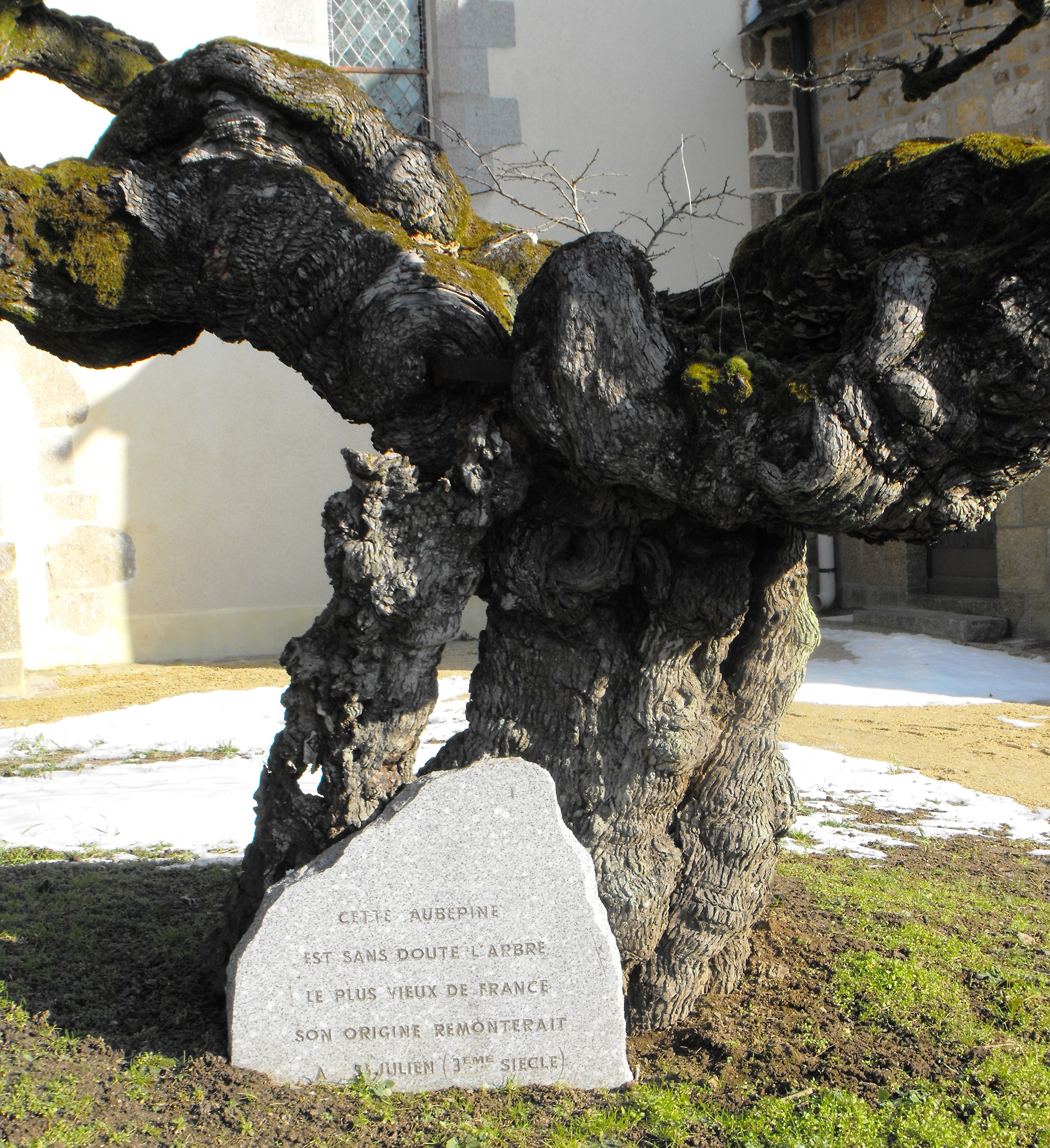
Bole of ancient hawthorn

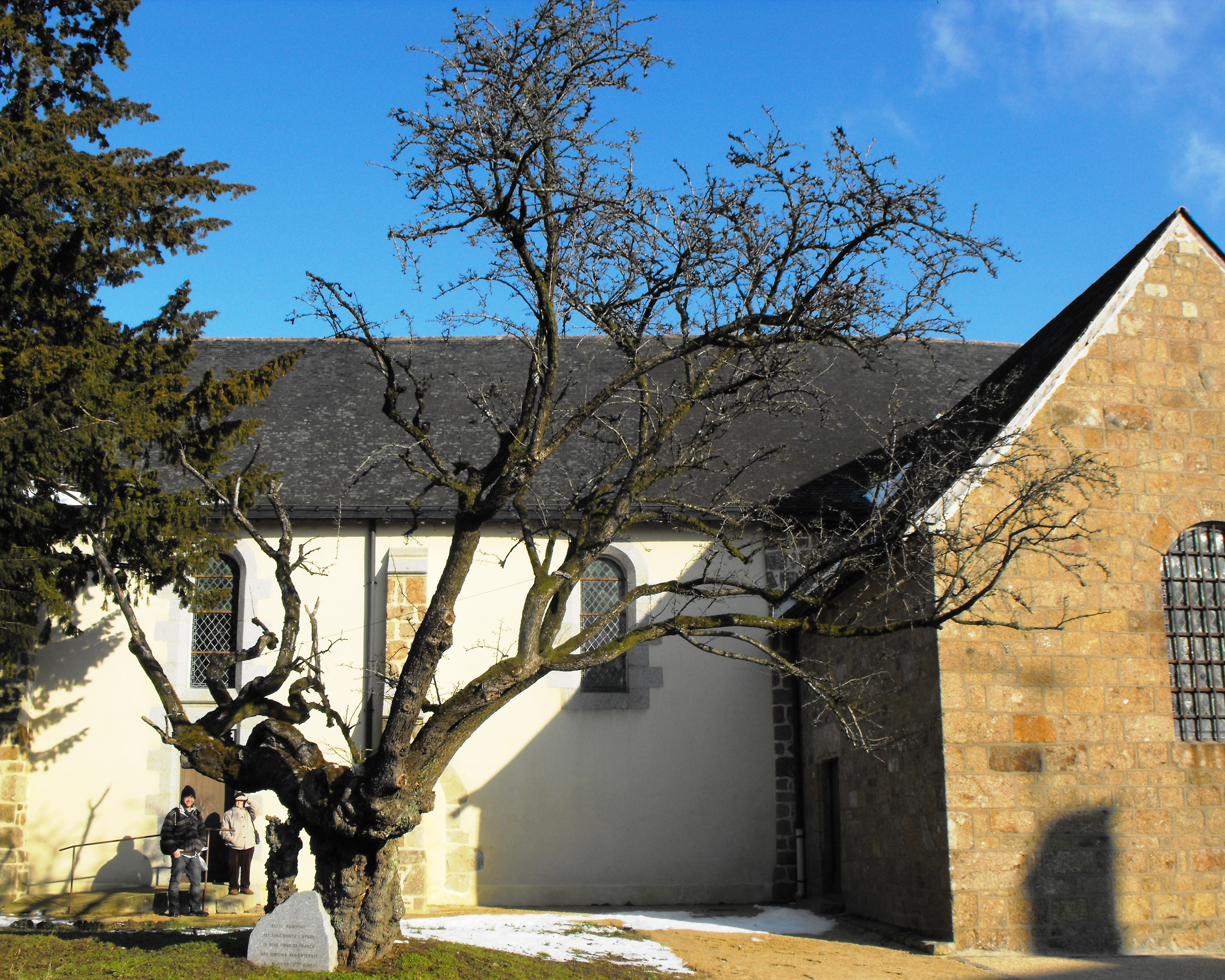
Saint Mars sur la Futaie

== See also ==
- Communes of the Mayenne department
