= Chantrigné =

- Commune
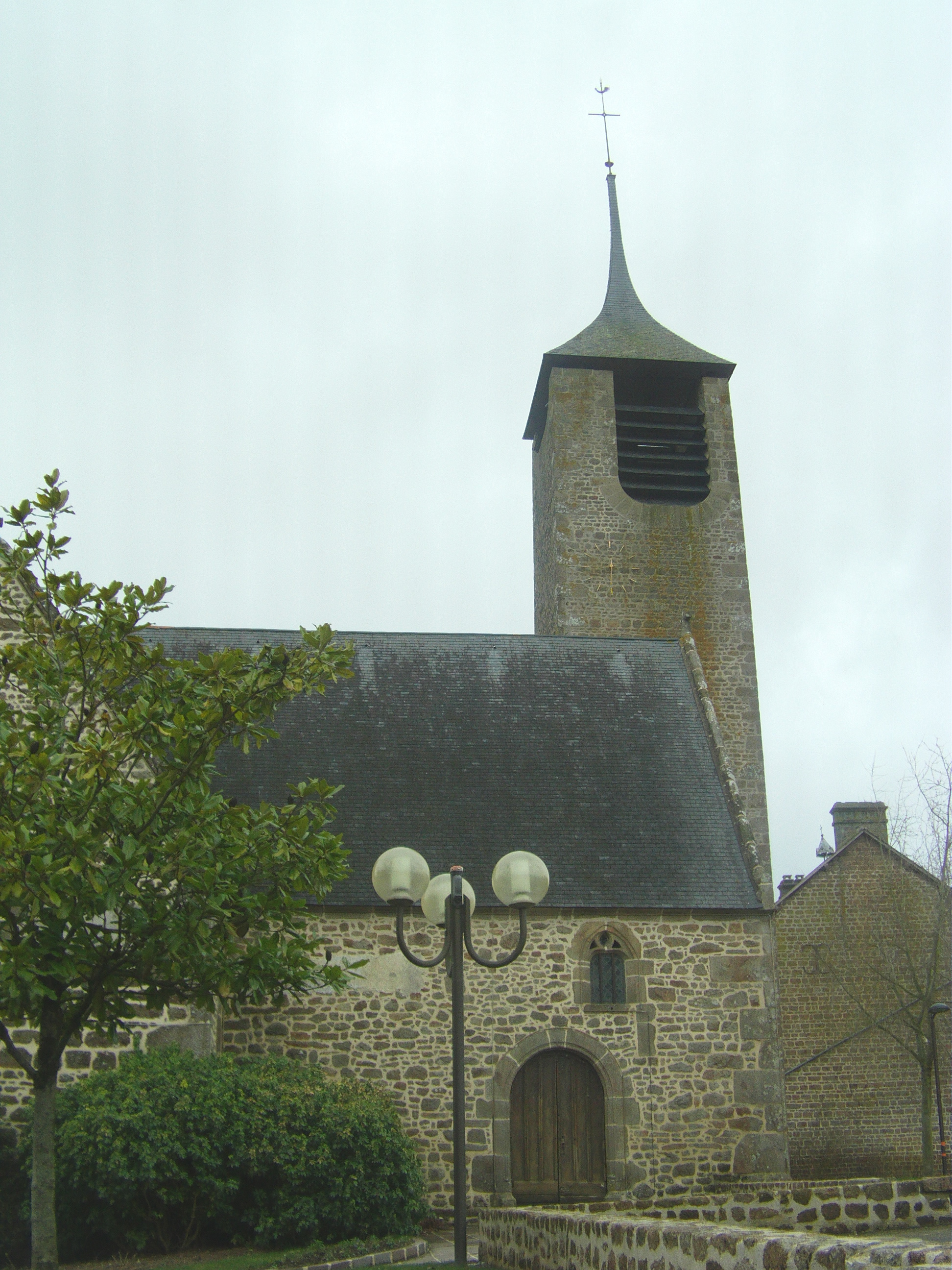
- The church in Chantrigné

- Coat of arms
- Location of Chantrigné
- Location within France Location within Pays de la Loire
- Coordinates: 48°24′58″N 0°33′57″W
- Country: France
- Region: Pays de la Loire
- Department: Mayenne
- Arrondissement: Mayenne
- Canton: Gorron

Government
  - Mayor (2020–2026): Françoise Duchemin
- Area^{1}: 18.62 km^{2} (7.19 sq mi)
- Elevation: 120 m (390 ft)
- Highest elevation: 285 m (935 ft)
- Lowest elevation: 97 m (318 ft)
- Population (2023): 599
  - Density: 32.2/km^{2} (83.3/sq mi)
- Time zone: UTC+01:00 (CET)
  - Summer (DST): UTC+02:00 (CEST)
- INSEE/Postal code: 53055 /53300
- ^{1} French Land Register data, which excludes lakes, ponds, glaciers > 1 km^{2} (0.386 sq mi or 247 acres) and river estuaries.

Chantrigné (French pronunciation: [ʃɑ̃tʁiɲe]) is a commune in the Mayenne department in north-western France.

== Geography ==
The commune is made up of the following collection of villages and hamlets, Louverné, Chantrigné, Beslay, La Chevalerie, La Heudelière and La Breneudière.

The river Mayenne flows through the commune.

== Points of Interest ==
=== National Heritage sites ===
The commune has a total of 3 buildings and areas listed as a Monument historique:

- Église Saint-Pierre-et-Saint-Paul - a church listed as monument historique in 1956.
- Menhir du Grand Coudray - is a Neolithic Menhir, that was listed as a monument in 1976.
- Allée couverte de la Hamelinière - is a Neolithic covered walkway, that was listed as a monument in 1932.

== See also ==
- Communes of the Mayenne department
