= Saint-Ellier-du-Maine =

- Commune
- Location of Saint-Ellier-du-Maine
- Location within France Location within Pays de la Loire
- Coordinates: 48°24′03″N 1°02′45″W
- Country: France
- Region: Pays de la Loire
- Department: Mayenne
- Arrondissement: Mayenne
- Canton: Gorron
- Intercommunality: Bocage Mayennais

Government
  - Mayor (2020–2026): Franck Barascud
- Area^{1}: 17.49 km^{2} (6.75 sq mi)
- Elevation: 180 m (590 ft)
- Highest elevation: 226 m (741 ft)
- Lowest elevation: 149 m (489 ft)
- Population (2023): 508
  - Density: 29.0/km^{2} (75.2/sq mi)
- Time zone: UTC+01:00 (CET)
  - Summer (DST): UTC+02:00 (CEST)
- INSEE/Postal code: 53213 /53220
- ^{1} French Land Register data, which excludes lakes, ponds, glaciers > 1 km^{2} (0.386 sq mi or 247 acres) and river estuaries.

Saint-Ellier-du-Maine (French pronunciation: [sɛ̃.t‿ɛlje dy mɛn], literally Saint-Ellier of the Maine) is a commune in the Mayenne department in north-western France.

The commune is part of the historical province of Maine.

== See also ==
- Communes of Mayenne
