= Saint-Berthevin-la-Tannière =

- Commune
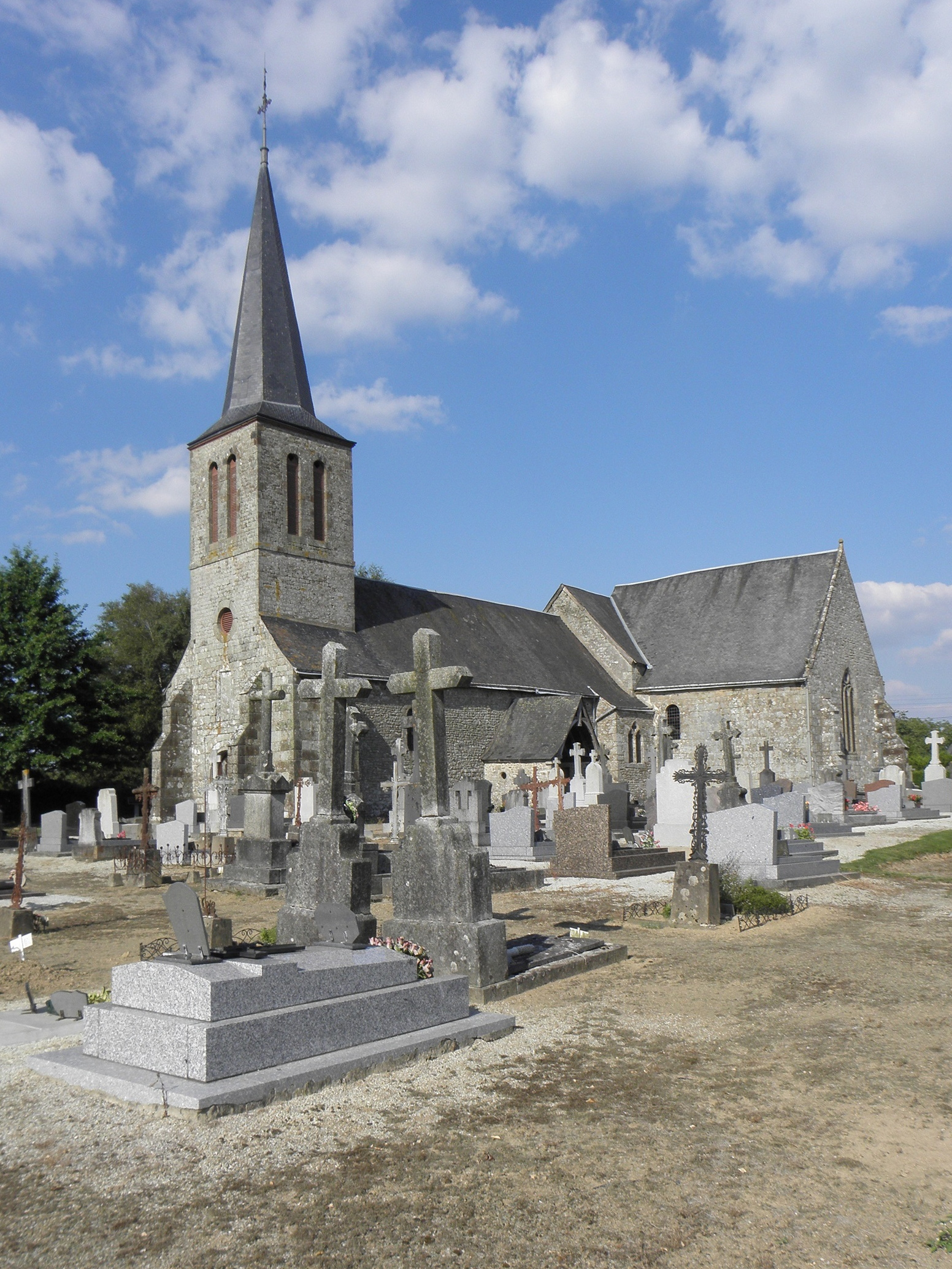
- The church in Saint-Berthevin-la-Tannière

- Coat of arms
- Location of Saint-Berthevin-la-Tannière
- Location within France Location within Pays de la Loire
- Coordinates: 48°24′06″N 0°56′43″W
- Country: France
- Region: Pays de la Loire
- Department: Mayenne
- Arrondissement: Mayenne
- Canton: Gorron
- Intercommunality: Bocage Mayennais

Government
  - Mayor (2020–2026): Léonce Lagoutte
- Area^{1}: 17.64 km^{2} (6.81 sq mi)
- Elevation: 500 m (1,600 ft)
- Highest elevation: 246 m (807 ft)
- Lowest elevation: 164 m (538 ft)
- Population (2023): 308
  - Density: 17.5/km^{2} (45.2/sq mi)
- Time zone: UTC+01:00 (CET)
  - Summer (DST): UTC+02:00 (CEST)
- INSEE/Postal code: 53202 /53220
- ^{1} French Land Register data, which excludes lakes, ponds, glaciers > 1 km^{2} (0.386 sq mi or 247 acres) and river estuaries.

Saint-Berthevin-la-Tannière (French pronunciation: [sɛ̃ bɛʁtəvɛ̃ la tanjɛʁ]) is a commune in the Mayenne department in north-western France.

== See also ==
- Communes of Mayenne
