= Nicholas of Gorran =

Nicholas of Gorran (or Gorrain) (1232–1295) was born in Gorron, France. He was a prominent French Roman Catholic medieval preacher and scriptural commentator.

== Biography ==
Gorran entered the Dominican Order in the convent of his native town and became one of its most illustrious alumni. His talents singled him out for special educational opportunities, and he was sent accordingly to the famous convent of St. James in Paris, where he subsequently served several terms as prior.

His piety and sound judgment attracted the attention of King Philip IV of France, whom he served in the double capacity of confessor and adviser. In most of his ecclesiastical studies he does not seem to have excelled notably; but in preaching and in the interpretation of the Scriptures he was unsurpassed by his contemporaries.

== Writings ==
His scriptural writings treat of all the books of the Old and the New Testament, and possess more than ordinary merit. Indeed, in such high esteem were they held by the doctors of the University of Paris that the latter were wont to designate their author as excellens postulator.

For his principium (Inc.: Hic est liber mandatorum), an introductory work to the entire Bible, he based himself on Thomas Aquinas's inaugural speech given at the University of Paris in 1256.

The commentaries on the Old Testament books of Ecclesiastes, Ezekiel and Daniel, while generally attributed to Nicholas of Gorran, have at times been ascribed to a different authorship.

His commentary on the Epistles of St. Paul is remarkably well done, and his gloss on the Apocalypse was deemed worthy of the highest commendation.

Besides his Scriptural writings he commented on Peter Lombard's Book of Sentences and on the Book of Distinctions.

His commentaries on the Gospels were published in folio at Cologne (1573) by Peter Quentel; and at Antwerp (1617) by John Keerberg. His commentaries on the Epistles of St. Paul were published at Cologne (1478); Hagenau (1502); Paris (1521); Antwerp (1617).
