= Couesmes-Vaucé =

- Commune
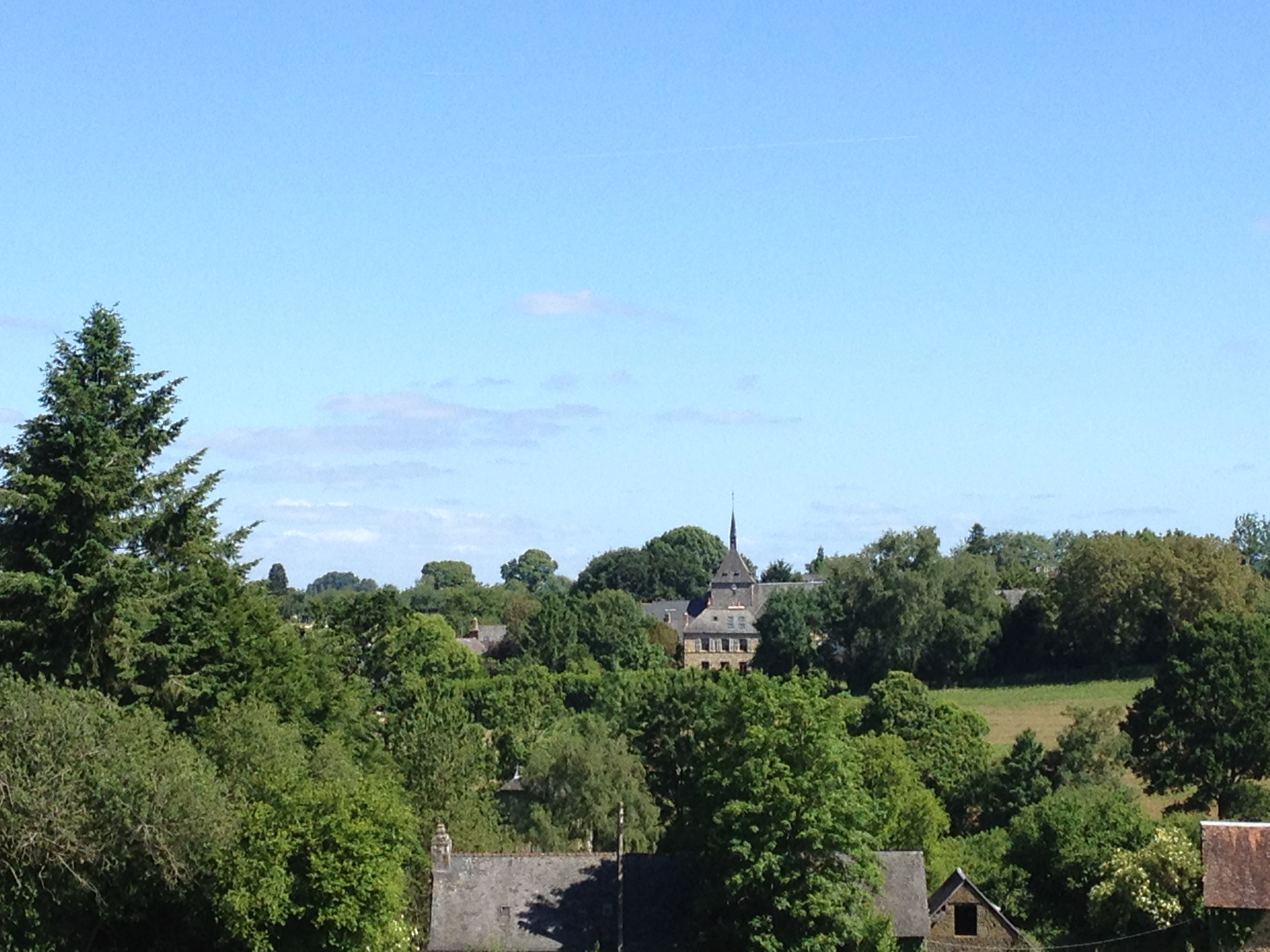
- Overall view of the village of Vaucé
- Location of Couesmes-Vaucé
- Location within France Location within Pays de la Loire
- Coordinates: 48°27′09″N 0°42′30″W
- Country: France
- Region: Pays de la Loire
- Department: Mayenne
- Arrondissement: Mayenne
- Canton: Gorron

Government
  - Mayor (2020–2026): Emmanuel Dorsy
- Area^{1}: 19.13 km^{2} (7.39 sq mi)
- Elevation: 150 m (490 ft)
- Highest elevation: 206 m (676 ft)
- Lowest elevation: 100 m (330 ft)
- Population (2023): 379
  - Density: 19.8/km^{2} (51.3/sq mi)
- Time zone: UTC+01:00 (CET)
  - Summer (DST): UTC+02:00 (CEST)
- INSEE/Postal code: 53079 /53300
- ^{1} French Land Register data, which excludes lakes, ponds, glaciers > 1 km^{2} (0.386 sq mi or 247 acres) and river estuaries.

Couesmes-Vaucé (French pronunciation: [kwɛm vose]) is a commune in the Mayenne department in north-western France. It was created in 1973 by the merger of two former communes: Couesmes-en-Froulay and Vaucé.

Couesmes-Vaucé is a small commune, with only 300 properties and as of the 2019 census 378 inhabitants.

Couesmes-Vaucé is close to both Normandy and Brittany and lies roughly 80 kilometres (50 mi) from the surrounding cities of Rennes, Caen and Le Mans. The village is situated in the heart of an agricultural region noted for its good food and cider.

It is an English community established 30 years ago.

== Geography ==
The river Varenne flows through the commune.

== See also ==
- Communes of the Mayenne department
