= Canton of Gorron =

Canton of France

Coordinates: 48.41°N 0.81°W

The canton of Gorron is an administrative division of the Mayenne department, northwestern France. Its borders were modified at the French canton reorganisation which came into effect in March 2015. Its seat is in Gorron.

It consists of the following communes:

1. Ambrières-les-Vallées
2. Brecé
3. Carelles
4. Chantrigné
5. Châtillon-sur-Colmont
6. Colombiers-du-Plessis
7. Couesmes-Vaucé
8. Désertines
9. La Dorée
10. Fougerolles-du-Plessis
11. Gorron
12. Hercé
13. Landivy
14. Lesbois
15. Levaré
16. Montaudin
17. Oisseau
18. Le Pas
19. Pontmain
20. Saint-Aubin-Fosse-Louvain
21. Saint-Berthevin-la-Tannière
22. Saint-Ellier-du-Maine
23. Saint-Loup-du-Gast
24. Saint-Mars-sur-Colmont
25. Saint-Mars-sur-la-Futaie
26. Soucé
27. Vieuvy
