= Soucé =

- Commune
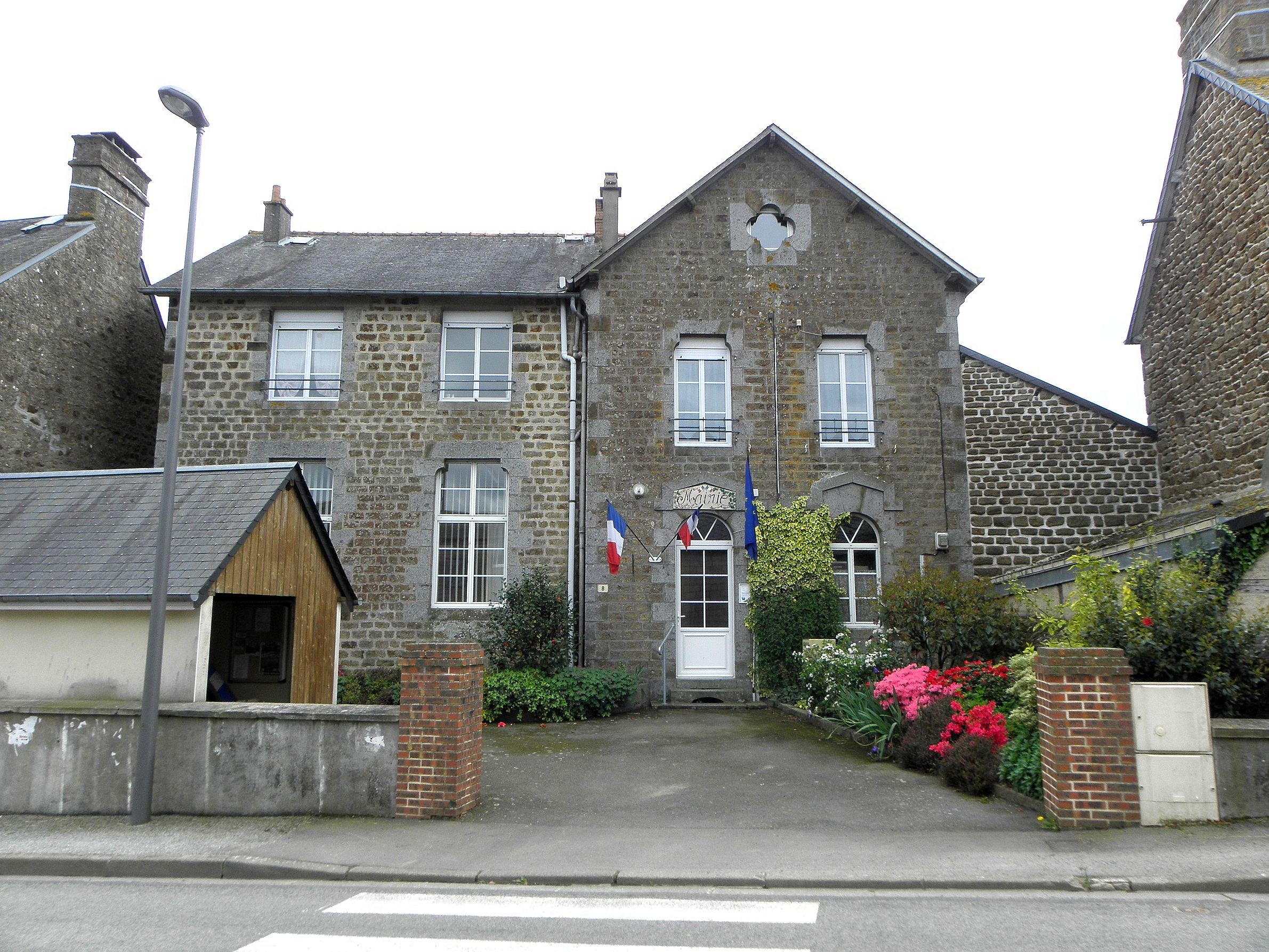
- Town hall
- Location of Soucé
- Location within France Location within Pays de la Loire
- Coordinates: 48°28′30″N 0°39′47″W
- Country: France
- Region: Pays de la Loire
- Department: Mayenne
- Arrondissement: Mayenne
- Canton: Gorron

Government
  - Mayor (2020–2026): Roland Angot
- Area^{1}: 6.67 km^{2} (2.58 sq mi)
- Elevation: 157 m (515 ft)
- Highest elevation: 154 m (505 ft)
- Lowest elevation: 101 m (331 ft)
- Population (2023): 139
  - Density: 20.8/km^{2} (54.0/sq mi)
- Time zone: UTC+01:00 (CET)
  - Summer (DST): UTC+02:00 (CEST)
- INSEE/Postal code: 53261 /53300
- ^{1} French Land Register data, which excludes lakes, ponds, glaciers > 1 km^{2} (0.386 sq mi or 247 acres) and river estuaries.

Soucé (French pronunciation: [suse]) is a commune in the Mayenne department in north-western France.

== Geography ==
The commune is made up of the following collection of villages and hamlets, La Censé, Valaubin, Soucé, La Moussardais and Le Hameau.

The river Varenne flows through the commune.

== See also ==
- Communes of the Mayenne department
