= Lesbois =

- Commune
- Coat of arms
- Location of Lesbois
- Location within France Location within Pays de la Loire
- Coordinates: 48°26′30″N 0°48′11″W
- Country: France
- Region: Pays de la Loire
- Department: Mayenne
- Arrondissement: Mayenne
- Canton: Gorron

Government
  - Mayor (2020–2026): Jean-Paul Gahéry
- Area^{1}: 5.99 km^{2} (2.31 sq mi)
- Elevation: 200 m (660 ft)
- Highest elevation: 212 m (696 ft)
- Lowest elevation: 158 m (518 ft)
- Population (2023): 179
  - Density: 29.9/km^{2} (77.4/sq mi)
- Time zone: UTC+01:00 (CET)
  - Summer (DST): UTC+02:00 (CEST)
- INSEE/Postal code: 53131 /53120
- ^{1} French Land Register data, which excludes lakes, ponds, glaciers > 1 km^{2} (0.386 sq mi or 247 acres) and river estuaries.

Lesbois (French pronunciation: [lebwa]) is a commune in the Mayenne department in north-western France.

== See also ==
- Communes of the Mayenne department
