= Désertines, Mayenne =

Désertines
- Commune
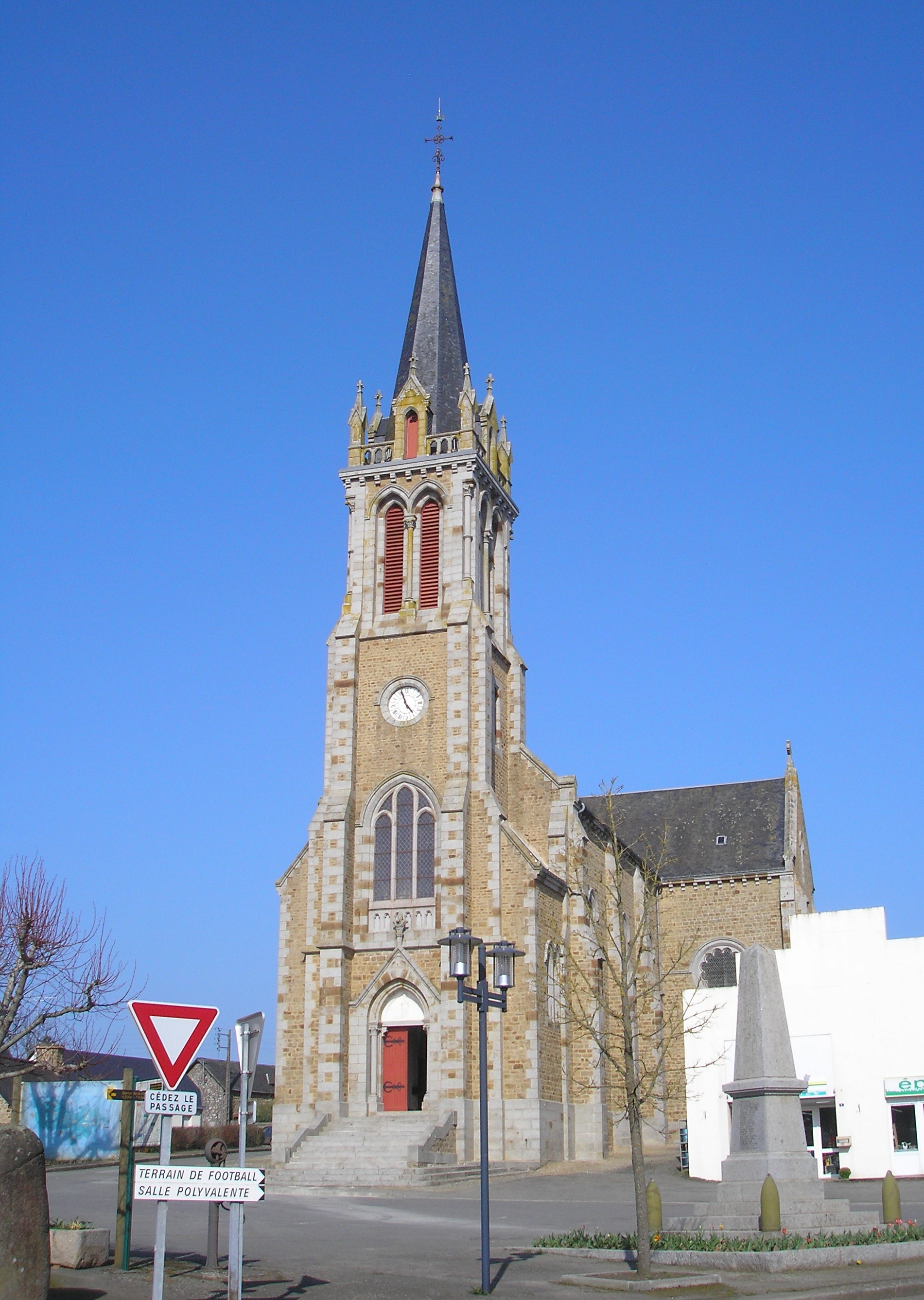
- The church of Saint-Pierre, in Désertines

- Coat of arms
- Location of Désertines
- Location within France Location within Pays de la Loire
- Coordinates: 48°28′09″N 0°51′55″W
- Country: France
- Region: Pays de la Loire
- Department: Mayenne
- Arrondissement: Mayenne
- Canton: Gorron

Government
  - Mayor (2020–2026): Bruno Lestas
- Area^{1}: 26.03 km^{2} (10.05 sq mi)
- Elevation: 192 m (630 ft)
- Highest elevation: 234 m (768 ft)
- Lowest elevation: 157 m (515 ft)
- Population (2023): 468
  - Density: 18.0/km^{2} (46.6/sq mi)
- Time zone: UTC+01:00 (CET)
  - Summer (DST): UTC+02:00 (CEST)
- INSEE/Postal code: 53091 /53190
- ^{1} French Land Register data, which excludes lakes, ponds, glaciers > 1 km^{2} (0.386 sq mi or 247 acres) and river estuaries.

Désertines (French pronunciation: [dezɛʁtin]) is a commune in the Mayenne department in north-western France.

== Sights ==
- Saint-Pierre Church (19th century).
- Gallic stele, listed as historical monuments since 1924.
- Manor, also known as the Château de la Grande Haie.
- The Manor of the Vairie.

== See also ==
- Communes of the Mayenne department
