= Landivy =

- Commune
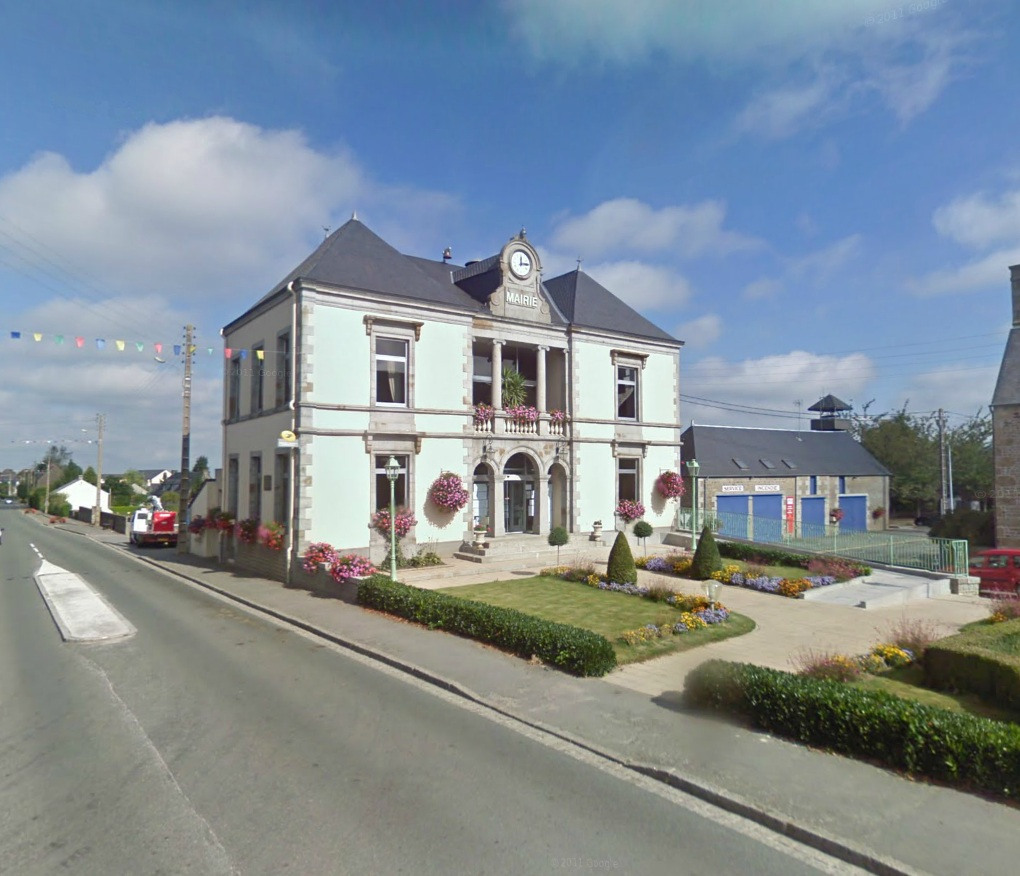
- The town hall in Landivy

- Coat of arms
- Location of Landivy
- Location within France Location within Pays de la Loire
- Coordinates: 48°28′47″N 1°01′56″W
- Country: France
- Region: Pays de la Loire
- Department: Mayenne
- Arrondissement: Mayenne
- Canton: Gorron

Government
  - Mayor (2020–2026): Marcel Ronceray
- Area^{1}: 28.54 km^{2} (11.02 sq mi)
- Elevation: 200 m (660 ft)
- Highest elevation: 231 m (758 ft)
- Lowest elevation: 92 m (302 ft)
- Population (2023): 1,094
  - Density: 38.33/km^{2} (99.28/sq mi)
- Time zone: UTC+01:00 (CET)
  - Summer (DST): UTC+02:00 (CEST)
- INSEE/Postal code: 53125 /53190
- ^{1} French Land Register data, which excludes lakes, ponds, glaciers > 1 km^{2} (0.386 sq mi or 247 acres) and river estuaries.

Landivy (French pronunciation: [lɑ̃divi]) is a commune in the Mayenne department in north-western France.

== See also ==
- Communes of the Mayenne department
