= Gorron =

- Commune
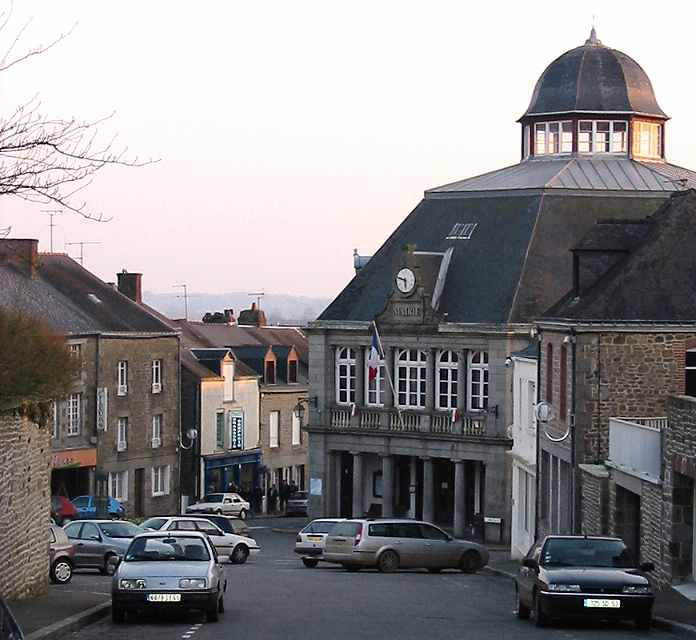
- The town hall in Gorron

- Coat of arms
- Location of Gorron
- Location within France Location within Pays de la Loire
- Coordinates: 48°24′45″N 0°48′41″W
- Country: France
- Region: Pays de la Loire
- Department: Mayenne
- Arrondissement: Mayenne
- Canton: Gorron

Government
  - Mayor (2020–2026): Jean-Marc Allain
- Area^{1}: 14.32 km^{2} (5.53 sq mi)
- Elevation: 149 m (489 ft)
- Highest elevation: 208 m (682 ft)
- Lowest elevation: 147 m (482 ft)
- Population (2023): 2,440
  - Density: 170/km^{2} (441/sq mi)
- Time zone: UTC+01:00 (CET)
  - Summer (DST): UTC+02:00 (CEST)
- INSEE/Postal code: 53107 /53120
- ^{1} French Land Register data, which excludes lakes, ponds, glaciers > 1 km^{2} (0.386 sq mi or 247 acres) and river estuaries.

Gorron (French pronunciation: [ɡɔʁɔ̃]) is a commune in the Mayenne department in north-western France. It has a twin town in the UK, Hayling Island, as well as a twin town in Germany, Schwaikheim. There are a range of shops and services to be found in Gorron. The river Colmont runs through it. There is a regular market in the town every Wednesday.

== Population ==
Historical population
Year	Pop.	±% p.a.
1968	2,400	—
1975	2,511	+0.65%
1982	2,825	+1.70%
1990	2,837	+0.05%
1999	2,894	+0.22%
2007	2,744	−0.66%
2012	2,702	−0.31%
2017	2,560	−1.07%
2021	2,511	−0.48%
2023	2,440	−1.42%
Source: INSEE

== See also ==
- Communes of the Mayenne department
- Nicholas of Gorran
