= Saint-Loup-du-Gast =

- Commune
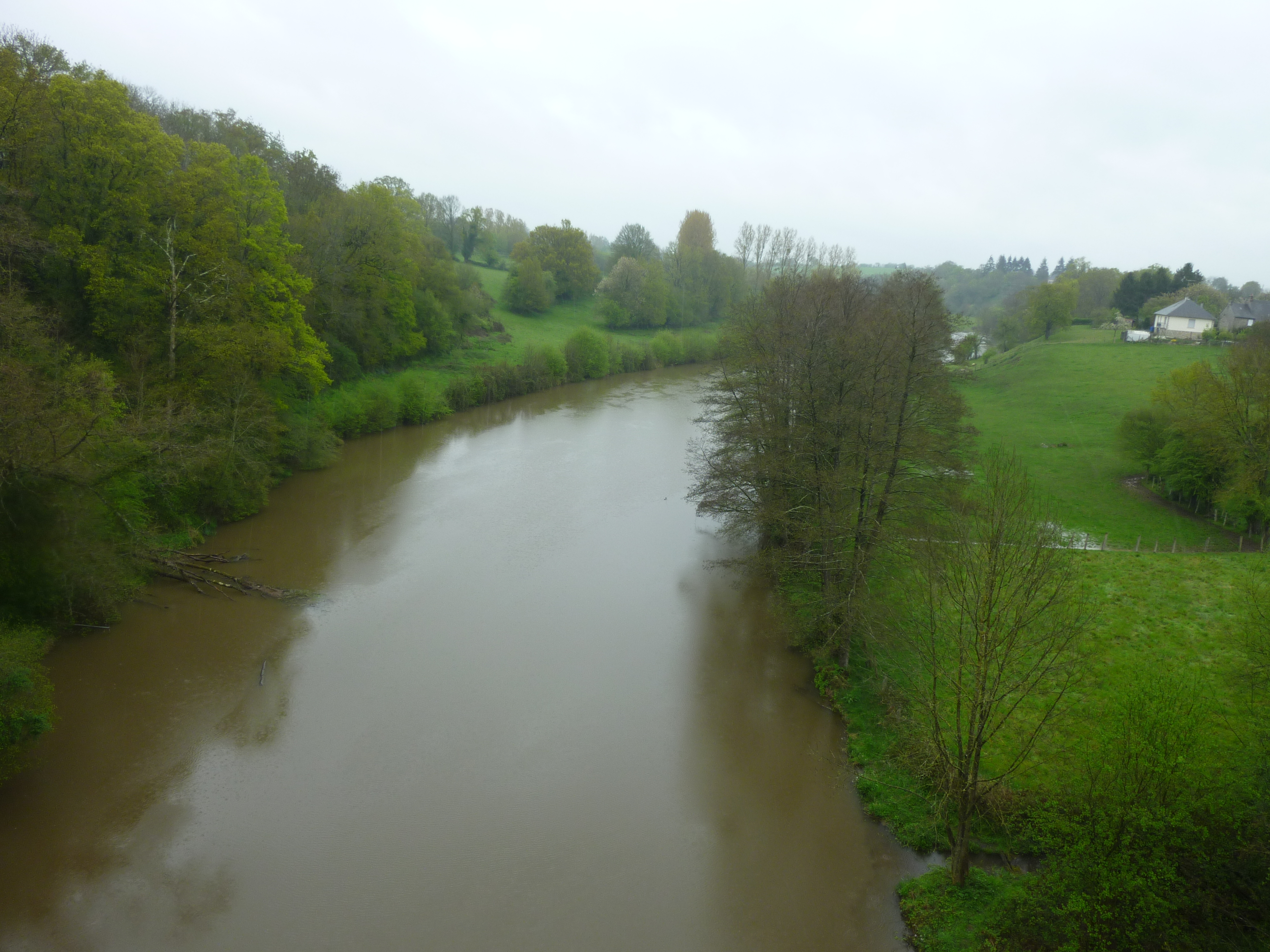
- The Mayenne river at Saint-Loup-du-Gast
- Location of Saint-Loup-du-Gast
- Location within France Location within Pays de la Loire
- Coordinates: 48°23′10″N 0°35′04″W
- Country: France
- Region: Pays de la Loire
- Department: Mayenne
- Arrondissement: Mayenne
- Canton: Gorron
- Intercommunality: Bocage Mayennais

Government
  - Mayor (2020–2026): Marcel Barbé
- Area^{1}: 9.98 km^{2} (3.85 sq mi)
- Elevation: 131 m (430 ft)
- Highest elevation: 162 m (531 ft)
- Lowest elevation: 95 m (312 ft)
- Population (2023): 313
  - Density: 31.4/km^{2} (81.2/sq mi)
- Time zone: UTC+01:00 (CET)
  - Summer (DST): UTC+02:00 (CEST)
- INSEE/Postal code: 53234 /53300
- ^{1} French Land Register data, which excludes lakes, ponds, glaciers > 1 km^{2} (0.386 sq mi or 247 acres) and river estuaries.

Saint-Loup-du-Gast is a commune in the Mayenne department in north-western France.

== See also ==
- Communes of the Mayenne department
