= Colmont =

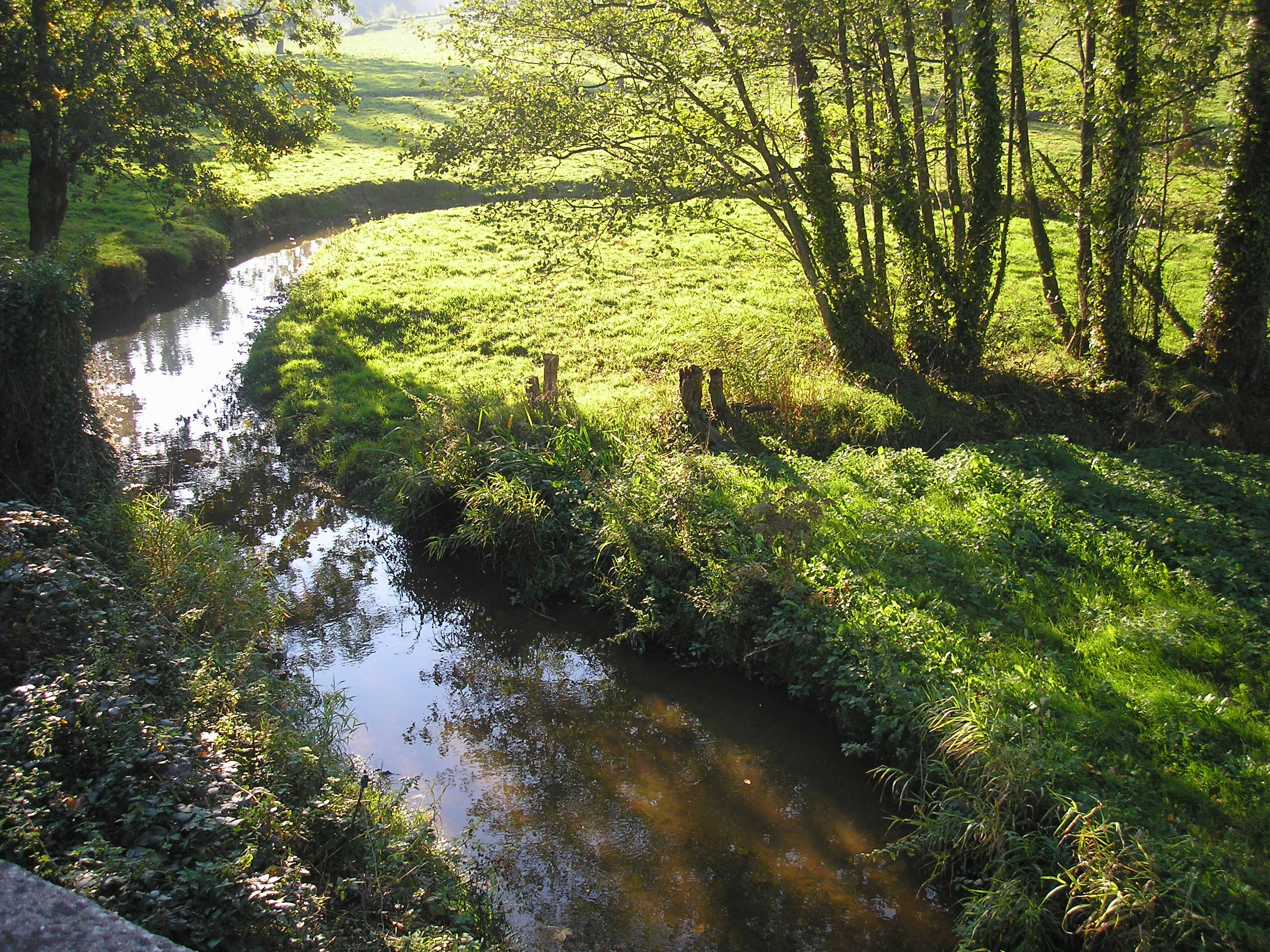
- The Colmont near Heussé

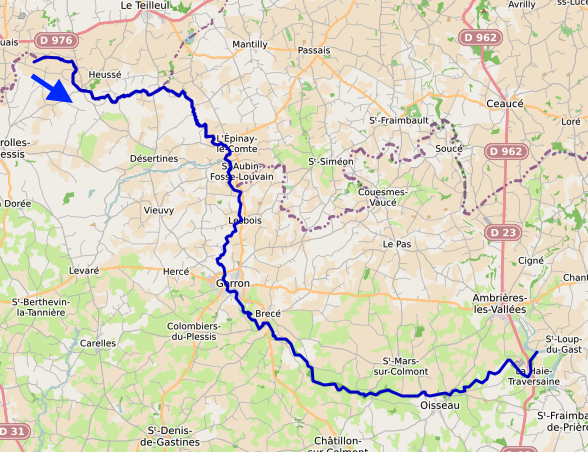

Location
- Country: France

Physical characteristics
- Mouth: Mayenne
  - coordinates: 48°22′52″N 0°36′14″W
- Length: 50.4 km (31.3 mi)

Basin features
- Progression: Mayenne→ Maine→ Loire→ Atlantic Ocean

The Colmont (French pronunciation: [kɔlmɔ̃]) is a 50.4 km (31.3 mi) long river in western France located in the departments of Orne, Manche (Normandy) and Mayenne (Pays de la Loire). It is a tributary of the river Mayenne on the right side, and so is a sub-tributary of the Loire by Mayenne and Maine. It flows into the Mayenne near Saint-Loup-du-Gast. Its longest tributary is the Ourde (11 km). The largest town on the Colmont is Gorron.
