= Departmental Council of Mayenne =

Departmental Council of Mayenne Conseil départemental de Mayenne

Leadership
- President: Olivier Richefou, UDI since 23 June 2014

Structure
- Seats: 34
- Political groups: Government (20): DVD (11); UDI (5); LR (4); Opposition (14): DVG (6); RE (3); LÉ (2); PCF (1); PS (1); UDI (1); www.lamayenne.fr

The Departmental Council of Mayenne (French: Conseil Départemental de Mayenne, Breton: Kuzul-departamant Mayenne) is the deliberative assembly of the Mayenne department in the region of Pays de la Loire. It consists of 34 members (general councilors) from 17 cantons.

The President of the General Council is Olivier Richefou.

== Vice-Presidents ==
The President of the Departmental Council is assisted by 10 vice-presidents chosen from among the departmental advisers. Each of them has a delegation of authority.

List of vice-presidents of the Mayenne Departmental Council (as of 2021)
Order	Name	Party	Canton
1st	Nicole Bouillon	DVD	Loiron
2nd	Vincent Saulnier	DVC	Château-Gontier-sur-Mayenne-2
3rd	Julie Ducoin	DVD	Meslay-du-Maine
4th	Gwénaël Poisson	DVC	Bonchamp-lès-Laval
5th	Jacqueline Arcanger	DVD	Ernée
6th	Gérard Dujarrier	DVD	Lassay-les-Châteaux
7th	Corinne Segrétain	DVD	Saint-Berthevin
8th	Joël Balandraud	DVC	Evron
9th	Sylvie Vielle	DVC	Bonchamp-lès-Laval
10th	Claude Tarlevé	DVD	Ernée

== See also ==
- Mayenne
- General councils of France
- Departmental Council of Mayenne (official website)
