= Entrammes =

- Commune
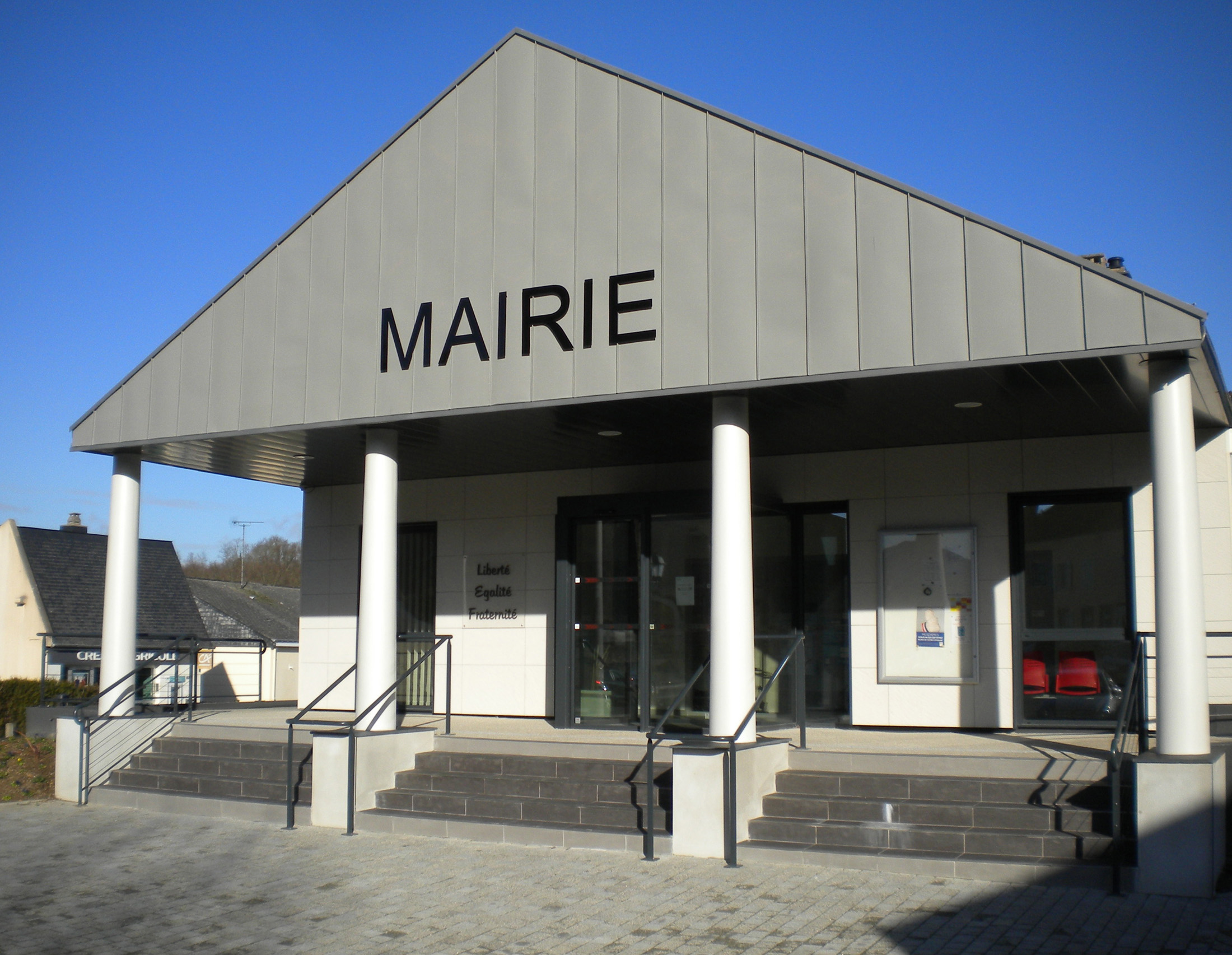
- The new Town Hall in Entrammes

- Coat of arms
- Location of Entrammes
- Location within France Location within Pays de la Loire
- Coordinates: 47°59′48″N 0°42′45″W
- Country: France
- Region: Pays de la Loire
- Department: Mayenne
- Arrondissement: Laval
- Canton: L'Huisserie
- Intercommunality: Laval Agglomération

Government
  - Mayor (2020–2026): Jérôme Allaire
- Area^{1}: 26.16 km^{2} (10.10 sq mi)
- Elevation: 50 m (160 ft)
- Highest elevation: 108 m (354 ft)
- Lowest elevation: 33 m (108 ft)
- Population (2023): 2,294
  - Density: 87.69/km^{2} (227.1/sq mi)
- Time zone: UTC+01:00 (CET)
  - Summer (DST): UTC+02:00 (CEST)
- INSEE/Postal code: 53094 /53260
- ^{1} French Land Register data, which excludes lakes, ponds, glaciers > 1 km^{2} (0.386 sq mi or 247 acres) and river estuaries.

Entrammes (French pronunciation: [ɑ̃tʁam]) is a commune in the Mayenne department in north-western France. It is located about 3.7 kilometres (2.3 mi) west of Parné-sur-Roc and about 3.7 kilometres (2.3 mi) south of Laval Entrammes Airport in Laval.

== History ==
Entrammes owes its location to a major ford across the rivers Mayenne and Jouanne: the road connecting Le Mans to Rennes traditionally crossed the river here. Consequently, a substantial town covering approximately 55 hectares existed here already two thousand years ago, and was already settled during the first century BC.

== Population ==
Historical population
Year	Pop.	±% p.a.
1968	1,019	—
1975	1,183	+2.15%
1982	1,582	+4.24%
1990	1,802	+1.64%
1999	1,847	+0.27%
2007	2,108	+1.67%
2012	2,237	+1.20%
2017	2,256	+0.17%
2023	2,294	+0.28%
Source: INSEE

== Gallery ==
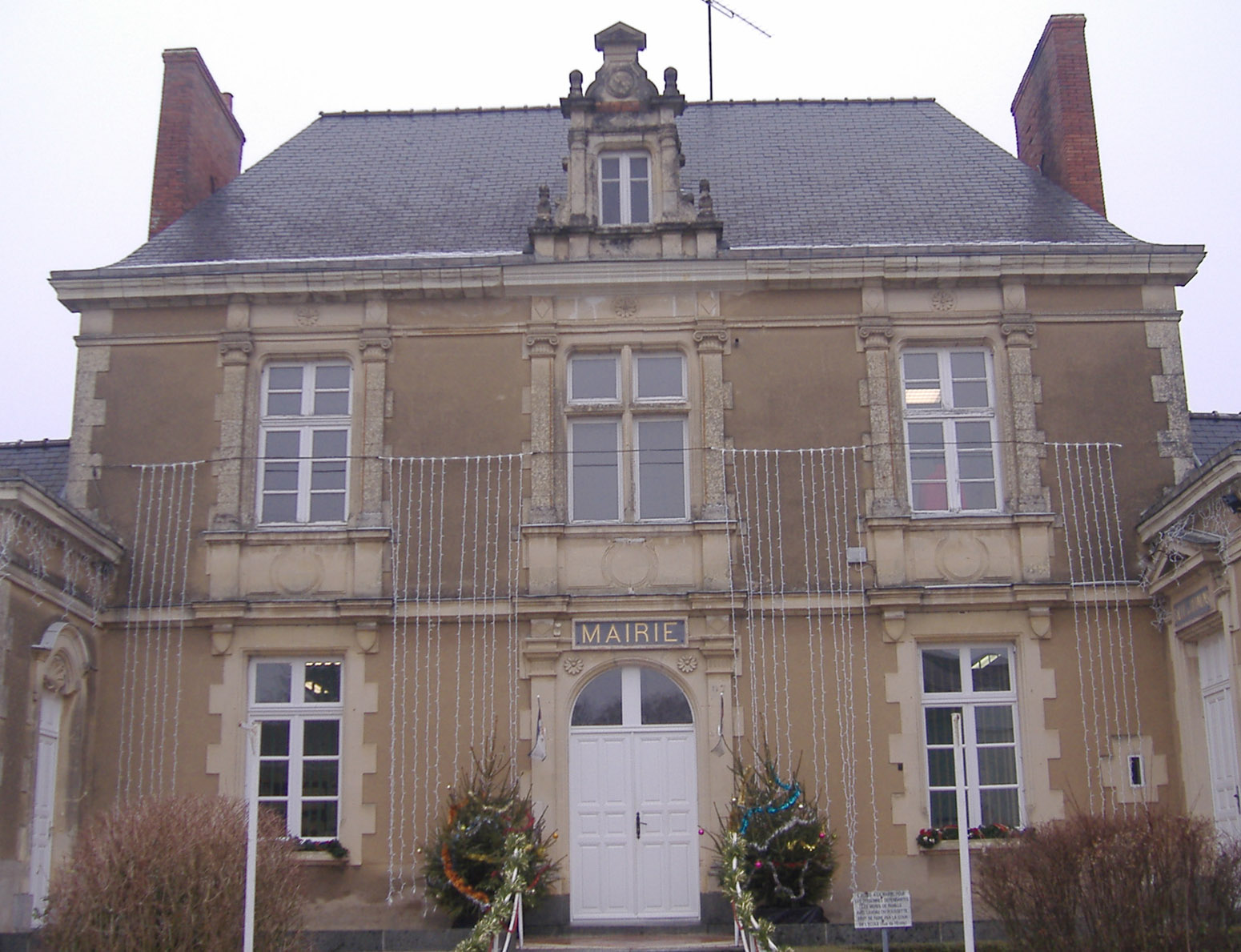
The old Town Hall

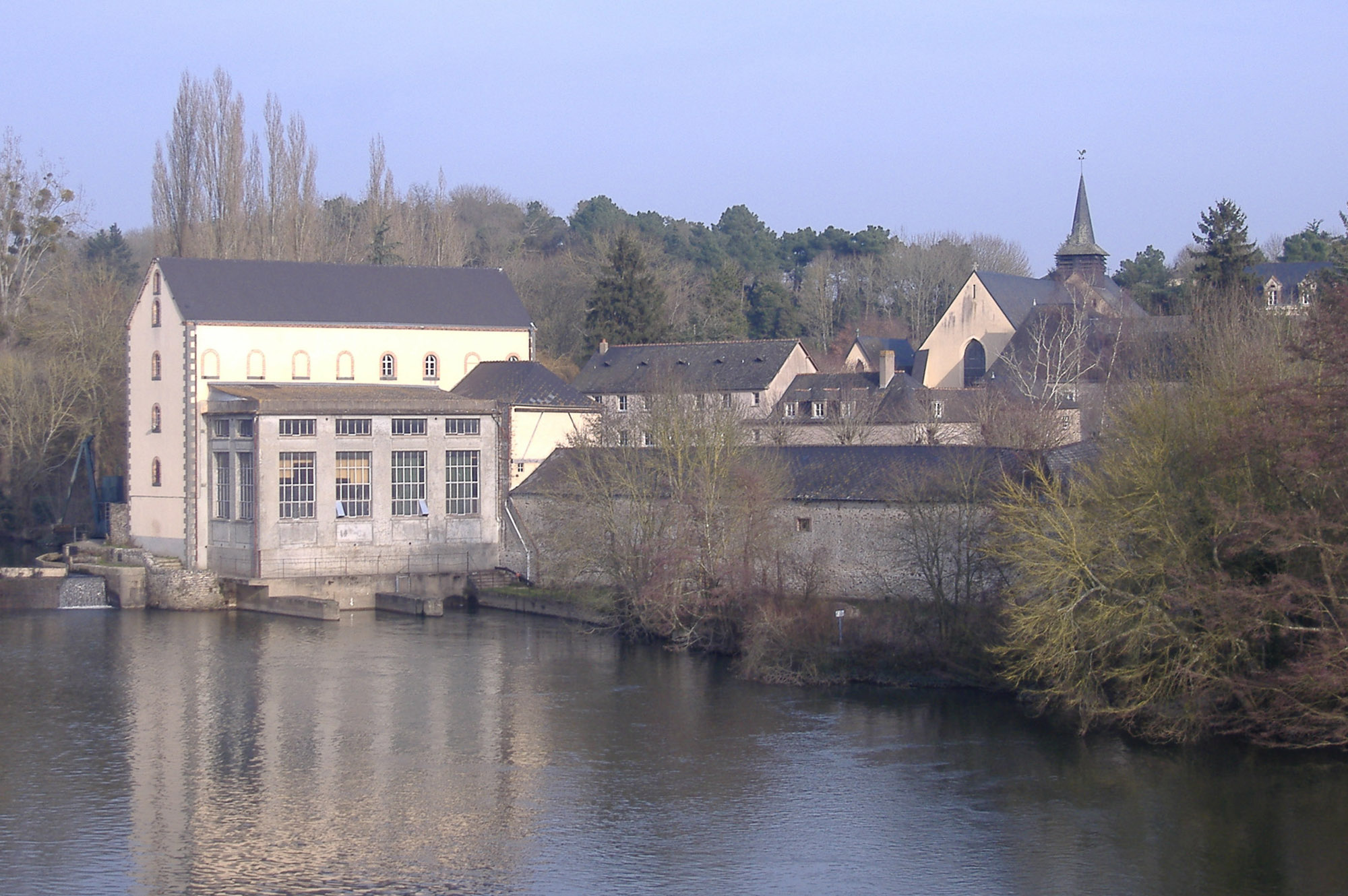
The Port-du-Salut Abbey

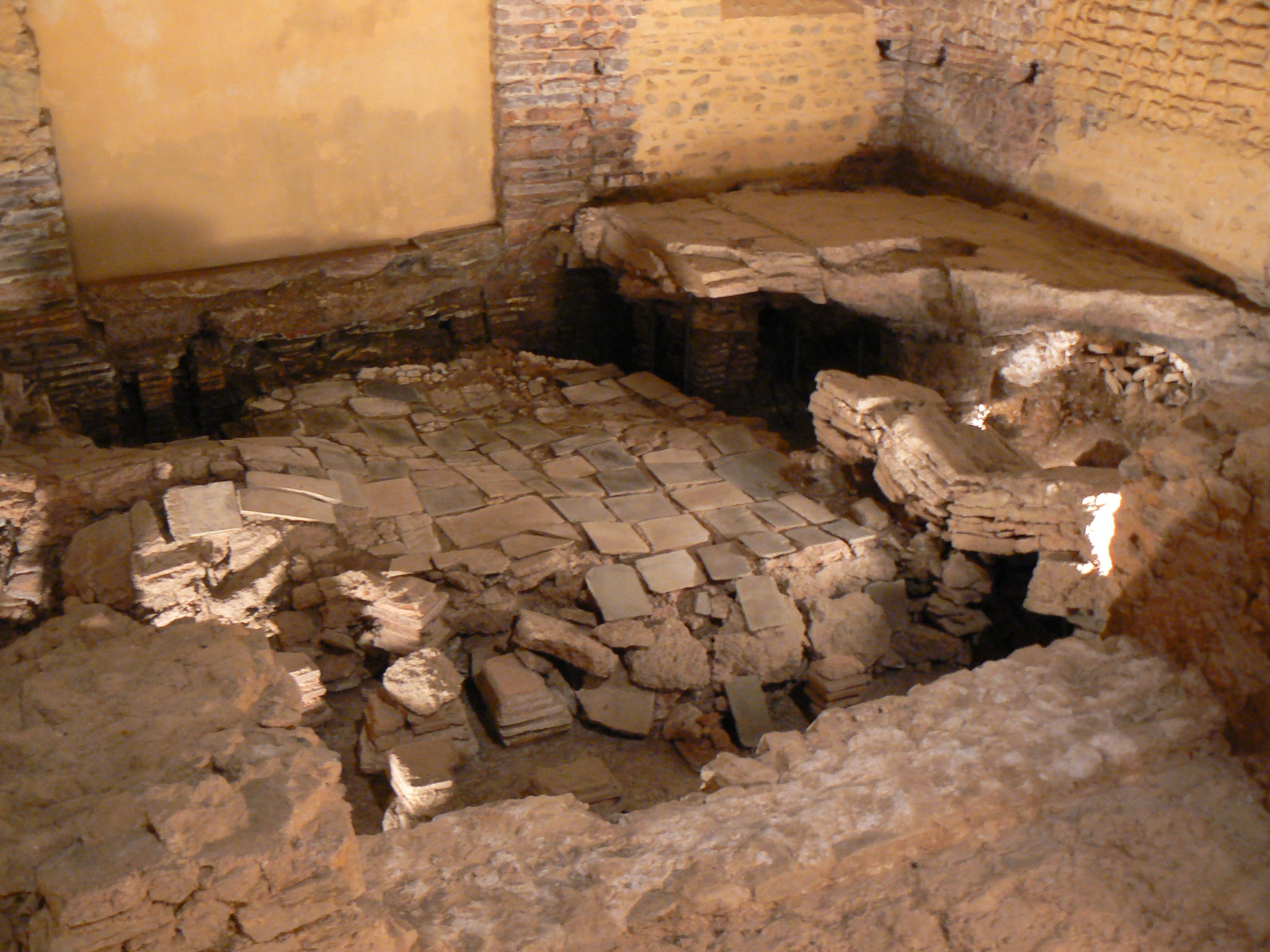
The Roman-Gaul Baths

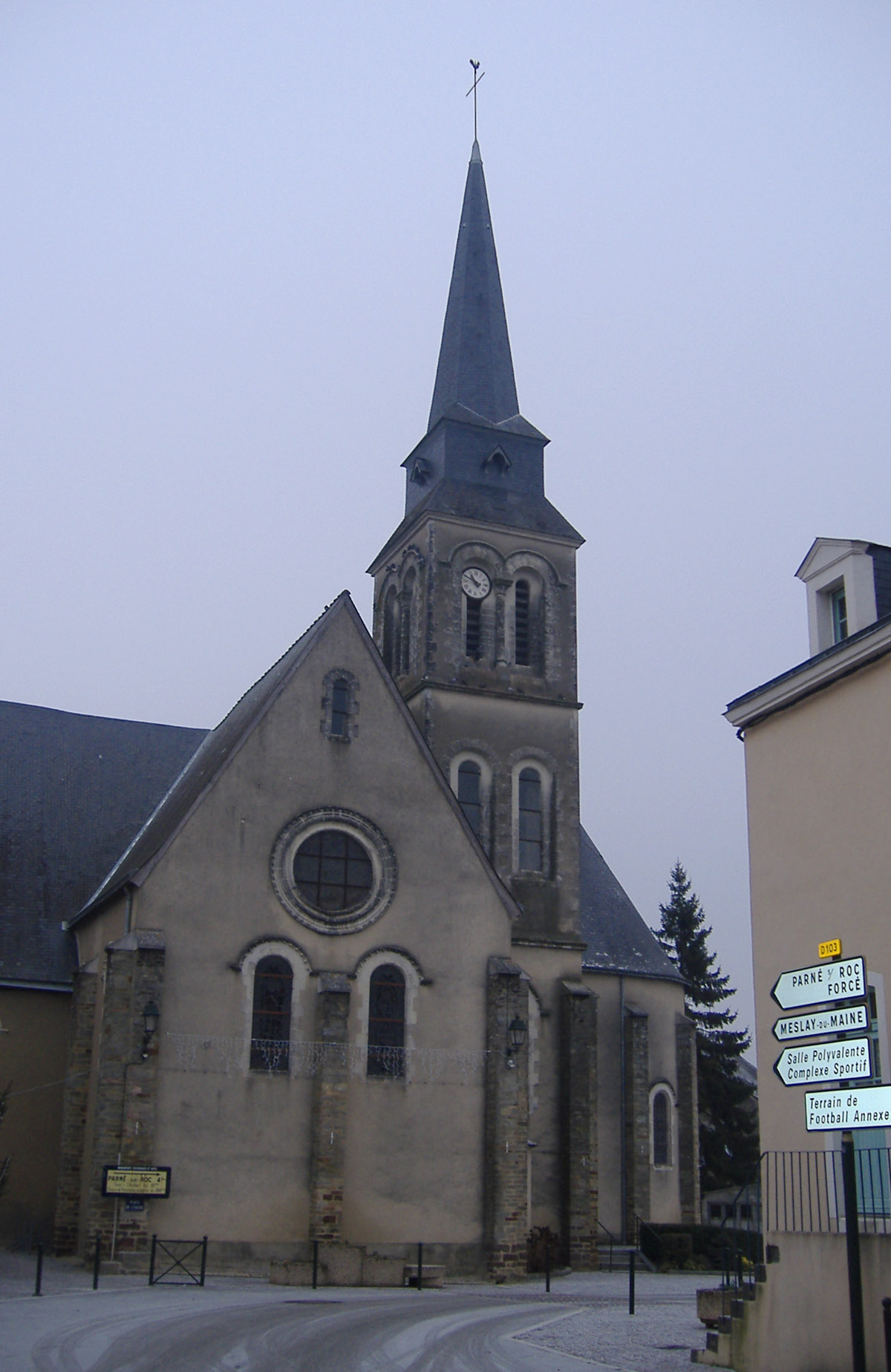
The parish church

== See also ==
- Communes of the Mayenne department
- Roman-Gaul Baths of Entrammes
