= Arrondissement of Laval =

Coordinates: 48.07°N 0.77°W

Laval
- Arrondissement
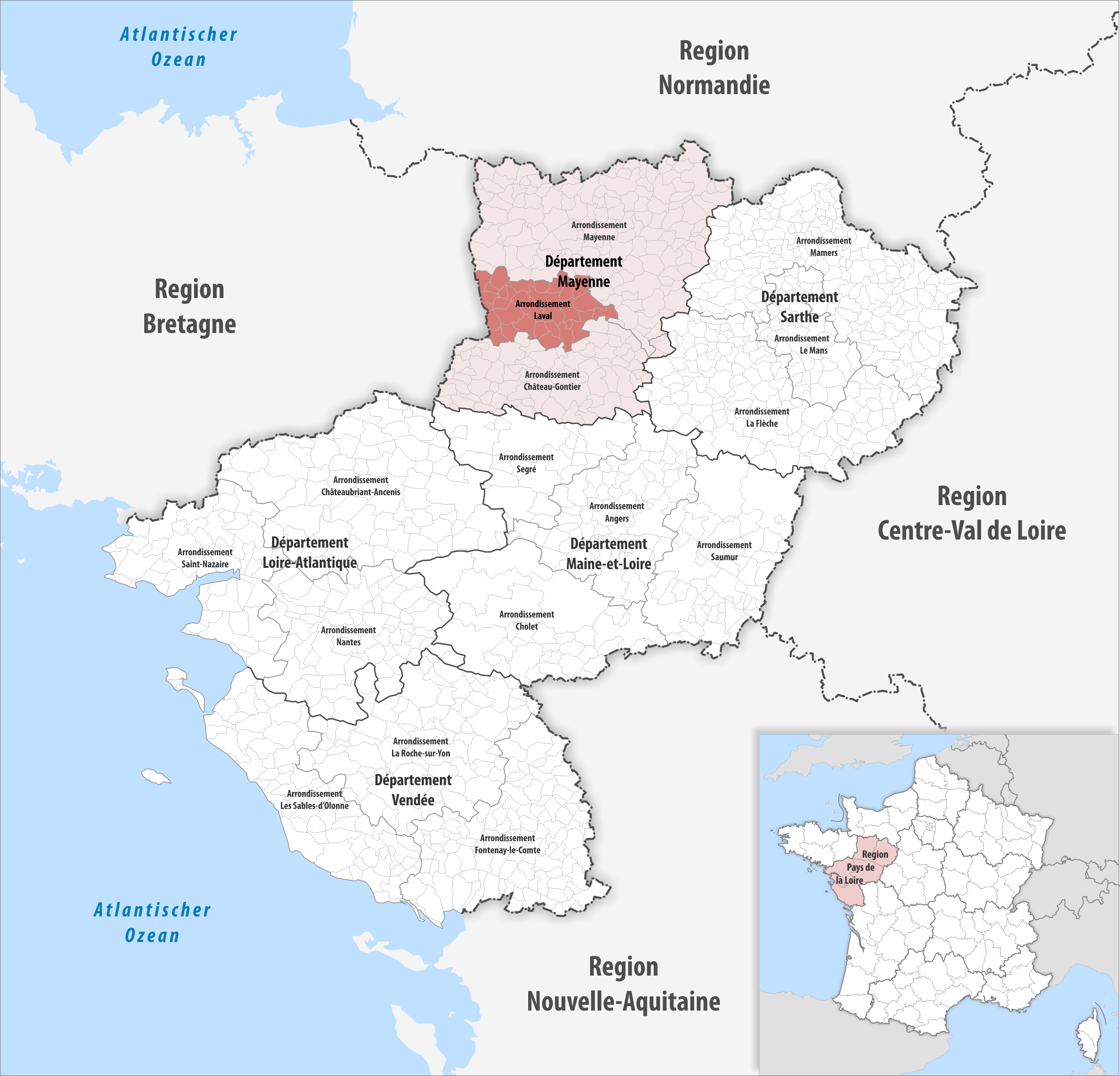
- Location within the region Pays de la Loire
- Country: France
- Region: Pays de la Loire
- Department: Mayenne
- No. of communes: {{{nbcomm}}}
- Area: 686.1 km^{2} (264.9 sq mi)
- Population (2023): 115,195
  - Density: 167.9/km^{2} (434.9/sq mi)
- INSEE code: 532

The arrondissement of Laval is an arrondissement of France in the Mayenne department in the Pays de la Loire region. It has 34 communes. Its population is 114,674 (2021), and its area is 686.1 km^{2} (264.9 sq mi).

== Composition ==
The communes of the arrondissement of Laval, and their INSEE codes, are:

1. Ahuillé (53001)
2. Argentré (53007)
3. Beaulieu-sur-Oudon (53026)
4. Bonchamp-lès-Laval (53034)
5. Le Bourgneuf-la-Forêt (53039)
6. Bourgon (53040)
7. La Brûlatte (53045)
8. Châlons-du-Maine (53049)
9. Changé (53054)
10. La Chapelle-Anthenaise (53056)
11. Entrammes (53094)
12. Forcé (53099)
13. Le Genest-Saint-Isle (53103)
14. La Gravelle (53108)
15. L'Huisserie (53119)
16. Launay-Villiers (53129)
17. Laval (53130)
18. Loiron-Ruillé (53137)
19. Louverné (53140)
20. Louvigné (53141)
21. Montflours (53156)
22. Montigné-le-Brillant (53157)
23. Montjean (53158)
24. Nuillé-sur-Vicoin (53168)
25. Olivet (53169)
26. Parné-sur-Roc (53175)
27. Port-Brillet (53182)
28. Saint-Berthevin (53201)
29. Saint-Cyr-le-Gravelais (53209)
30. Saint-Germain-le-Fouilloux (53224)
31. Saint-Jean-sur-Mayenne (53229)
32. Saint-Ouën-des-Toits (53243)
33. Saint-Pierre-la-Cour (53247)
34. Soulgé-sur-Ouette (53262)

== History ==
The arrondissement of Laval was created in 1800. At the March 2016 reorganisation of the arrondissements of Mayenne, it lost 14 communes to the arrondissement of Château-Gontier and 38 communes to the arrondissement of Mayenne.

As a result of the reorganisation of the cantons of France which came into effect in 2015, the borders of the cantons are no longer related to the borders of the arrondissements. The cantons of the arrondissement of Laval were, as of January 2015:

1. Argentré
2. Chailland
3. Évron
4. Laval-Est
5. Laval-Nord-Est
6. Laval-Nord-Ouest
7. Laval-Saint-Nicolas
8. Laval-Sud-Ouest
9. Loiron
10. Meslay-du-Maine
11. Montsûrs
12. Saint-Berthevin
13. Sainte-Suzanne
