= L'Huisserie =

- Commune
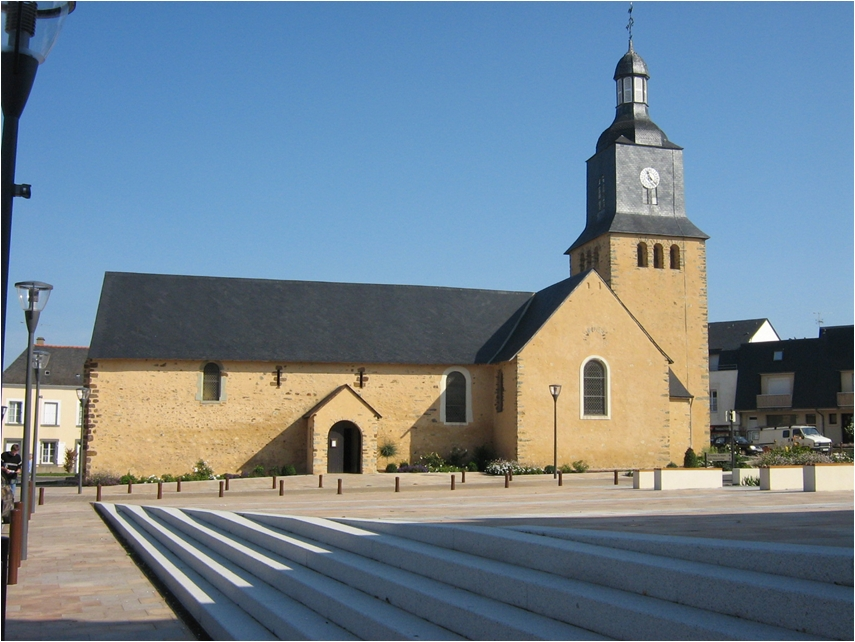
- The church of Saint Siméon, in L'Huisserie
- Location of L'Huisserie
- Location within France Location within Pays de la Loire
- Coordinates: 48°01′29″N 0°46′03″W
- Country: France
- Region: Pays de la Loire
- Department: Mayenne
- Arrondissement: Laval
- Canton: L'Huisserie
- Intercommunality: Laval Agglomération

Government
  - Mayor (2020–2026): Jean-Pierre Thiot
- Area^{1}: 14.72 km^{2} (5.68 sq mi)
- Highest elevation: 118 m (387 ft)
- Lowest elevation: 37 m (121 ft)
- Population (2023): 4,672
  - Density: 317.4/km^{2} (822.0/sq mi)
- Time zone: UTC+01:00 (CET)
  - Summer (DST): UTC+02:00 (CEST)
- INSEE/Postal code: 53119 /53970
- ^{1} French Land Register data, which excludes lakes, ponds, glaciers > 1 km^{2} (0.386 sq mi or 247 acres) and river estuaries.

L'Huisserie (French pronunciation: [lɥisʁi]) is a commune in the Mayenne department in north-western France.

It boards the Jouanne river.

== Population ==
Historical population
Year	Pop.	±% p.a.
1968	812	—
1975	1,651	+10.67%
1982	2,290	+4.78%
1990	2,863	+2.83%
1999	3,592	+2.55%
2007	3,901	+1.04%
2012	4,161	+1.30%
2017	4,244	+0.40%
2023	4,672	+1.61%
Source: INSEE

== Gallery ==
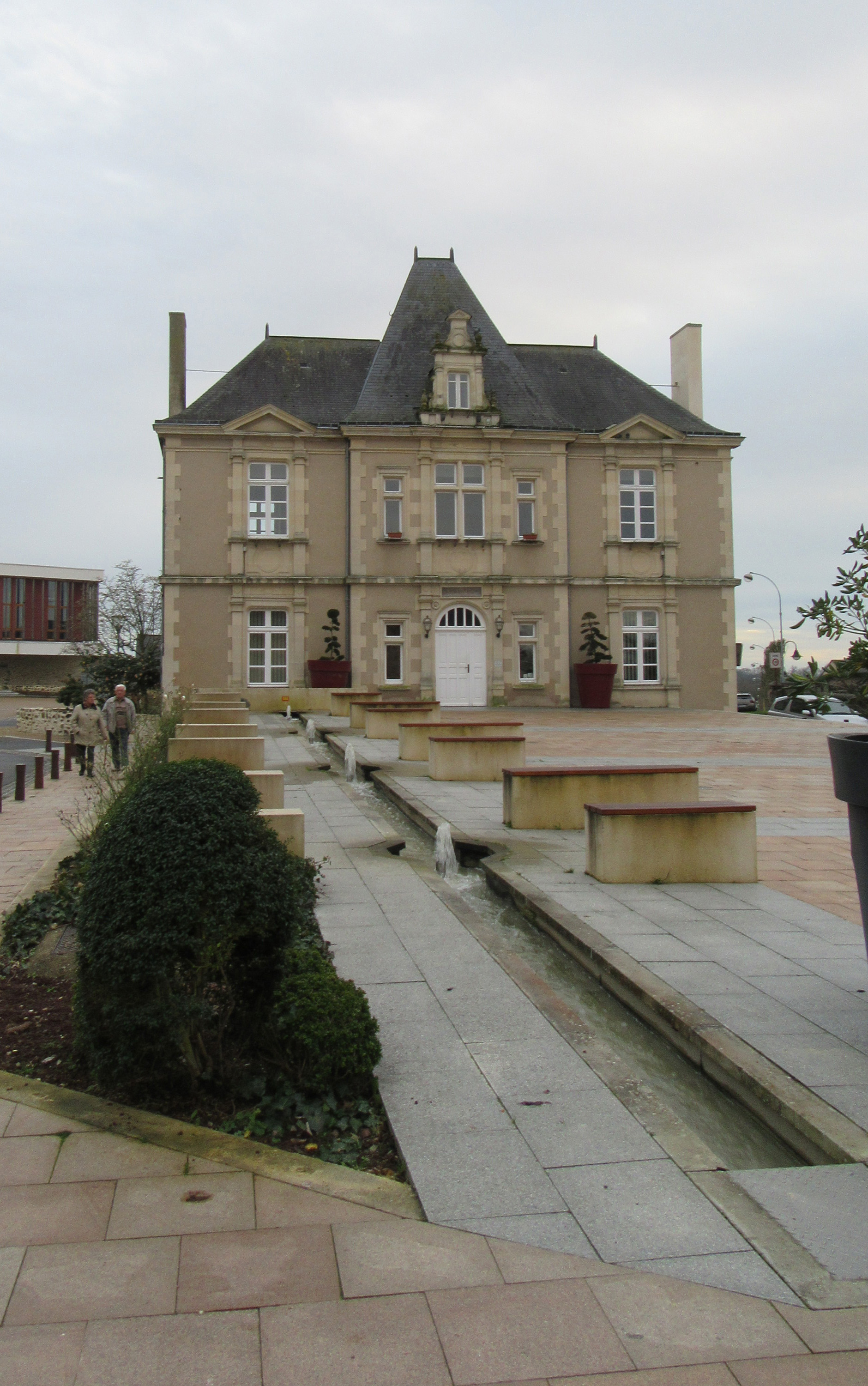
Town Hall

== See also ==
- Communes of the Mayenne department
