= Montigné-le-Brillant =

- Commune
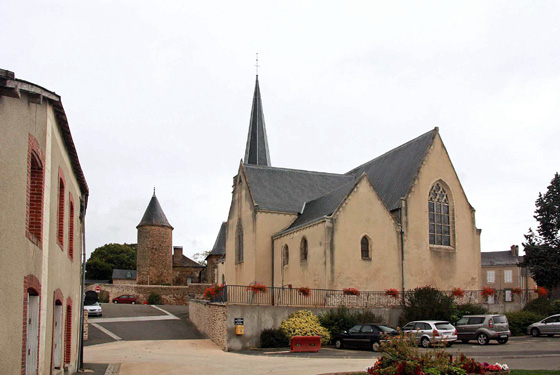
- The church of Saint Georges, in Montigné-le-Brillant
- Location of Montigné-le-Brillant
- Location within France Location within Pays de la Loire
- Coordinates: 48°00′31″N 0°48′51″W
- Country: France
- Region: Pays de la Loire
- Department: Mayenne
- Arrondissement: Laval
- Canton: L'Huisserie
- Intercommunality: Laval Agglomération

Government
  - Mayor (2020–2026): Gérard Travers
- Area^{1}: 18.05 km^{2} (6.97 sq mi)
- Elevation: 112 m (367 ft)
- Highest elevation: 117 m (384 ft)
- Lowest elevation: 47 m (154 ft)
- Population (2023): 1,366
  - Density: 75.68/km^{2} (196.0/sq mi)
- Time zone: UTC+01:00 (CET)
  - Summer (DST): UTC+02:00 (CEST)
- INSEE/Postal code: 53157 /53970
- ^{1} French Land Register data, which excludes lakes, ponds, glaciers > 1 km^{2} (0.386 sq mi or 247 acres) and river estuaries.

Montigné-le-Brillant (French pronunciation: [mɔ̃tiɲe lə bʁijɑ̃]) is a commune in the Mayenne department in north-western France.

== See also ==
- Communes of Mayenne
