= Saint-Pierre-la-Cour =

- Commune
- Location of Saint-Pierre-la-Cour
- Location within France Location within Pays de la Loire
- Coordinates: 48°06′56″N 1°01′29″W
- Country: France
- Region: Pays de la Loire
- Department: Mayenne
- Arrondissement: Laval
- Canton: Loiron-Ruillé
- Intercommunality: Laval Agglomération

Government
  - Mayor (2020–2026): Michel Paillard
- Area^{1}: 15.69 km^{2} (6.06 sq mi)
- Elevation: 96 m (315 ft)
- Highest elevation: 168 m (551 ft)
- Lowest elevation: 93 m (305 ft)
- Population (2023): 2,320
  - Density: 148/km^{2} (383/sq mi)
- Time zone: UTC+01:00 (CET)
  - Summer (DST): UTC+02:00 (CEST)
- INSEE/Postal code: 53247 /53410
- ^{1} French Land Register data, which excludes lakes, ponds, glaciers > 1 km^{2} (0.386 sq mi or 247 acres) and river estuaries.

Saint-Pierre-la-Cour (French pronunciation: [sɛ̃ pjɛʁ la kuʁ]) is a commune, in the Mayenne department in the north-western of France.

== Population ==
Historical population
Year	Pop.	±% p.a.
1968	1,750	—
1975	1,782	+0.26%
1982	1,668	−0.94%
1990	1,622	−0.35%
1999	1,638	+0.11%
2007	1,843	+1.48%
2012	2,046	+2.11%
2017	2,170	+1.18%
2023	2,320	+1.12%
Source: INSEE

== See also ==
- Communes of the Mayenne department
