= Ahuillé =

- Commune
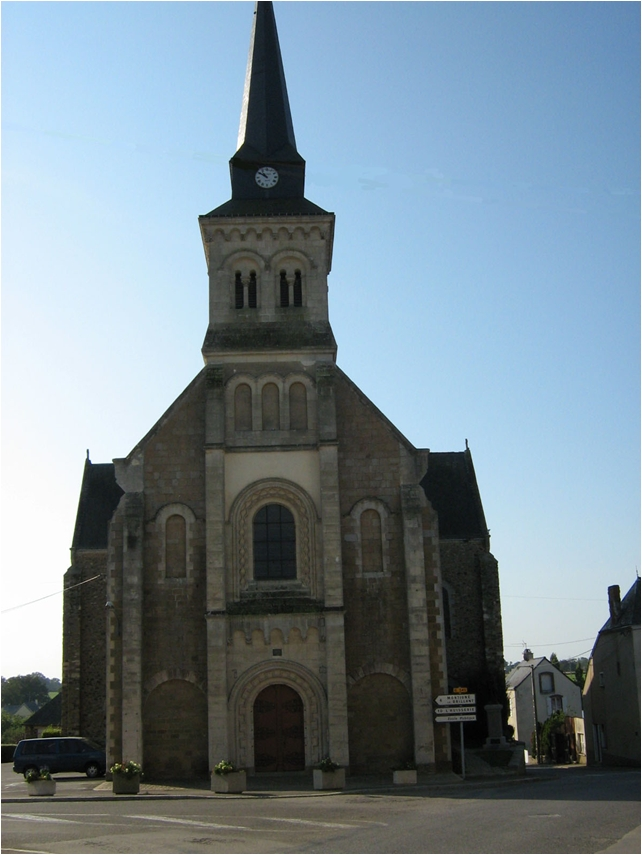
- The Church of the Assumption, in Ahuillé
- Location of Ahuillé
- Location within France Location within Pays de la Loire
- Coordinates: 48°01′14″N 0°52′10″W
- Country: France
- Region: Pays de la Loire
- Department: Mayenne
- Arrondissement: Laval
- Canton: L'Huisserie
- Intercommunality: Laval Agglomération

Government
  - Mayor (2020–2026): Sébastien Destais
- Area^{1}: 28.97 km^{2} (11.19 sq mi)
- Elevation: 85 m (279 ft)
- Highest elevation: 130 m (430 ft)
- Lowest elevation: 63 m (207 ft)
- Population (2023): 1,852
  - Density: 63.93/km^{2} (165.6/sq mi)
- Time zone: UTC+01:00 (CET)
  - Summer (DST): UTC+02:00 (CEST)
- INSEE/Postal code: 53001 /53940
- ^{1} French Land Register data, which excludes lakes, ponds, glaciers > 1 km^{2} (0.386 sq mi or 247 acres) and river estuaries.

Ahuillé (French pronunciation: [a.ɥije]) is a commune in the Mayenne department in northwestern France.

== Population ==
Historical population
Year	Pop.	±% p.a.
1968	841	—
1975	885	+0.73%
1982	1,454	+7.35%
1990	1,399	−0.48%
1999	1,379	−0.16%
2007	1,733	+2.90%
2012	1,871	+1.54%
2017	1,806	−0.70%
2023	1,852	+0.42%
Source: INSEE

== Notable people ==
- Edward Sorin (1814–1893), priest of the Congregation of Holy Cross

== See also ==
- Communes of Mayenne
