= Laval Agglomération =

Coordinates: 48.07°N 0.77°W

- Communauté d'agglomération
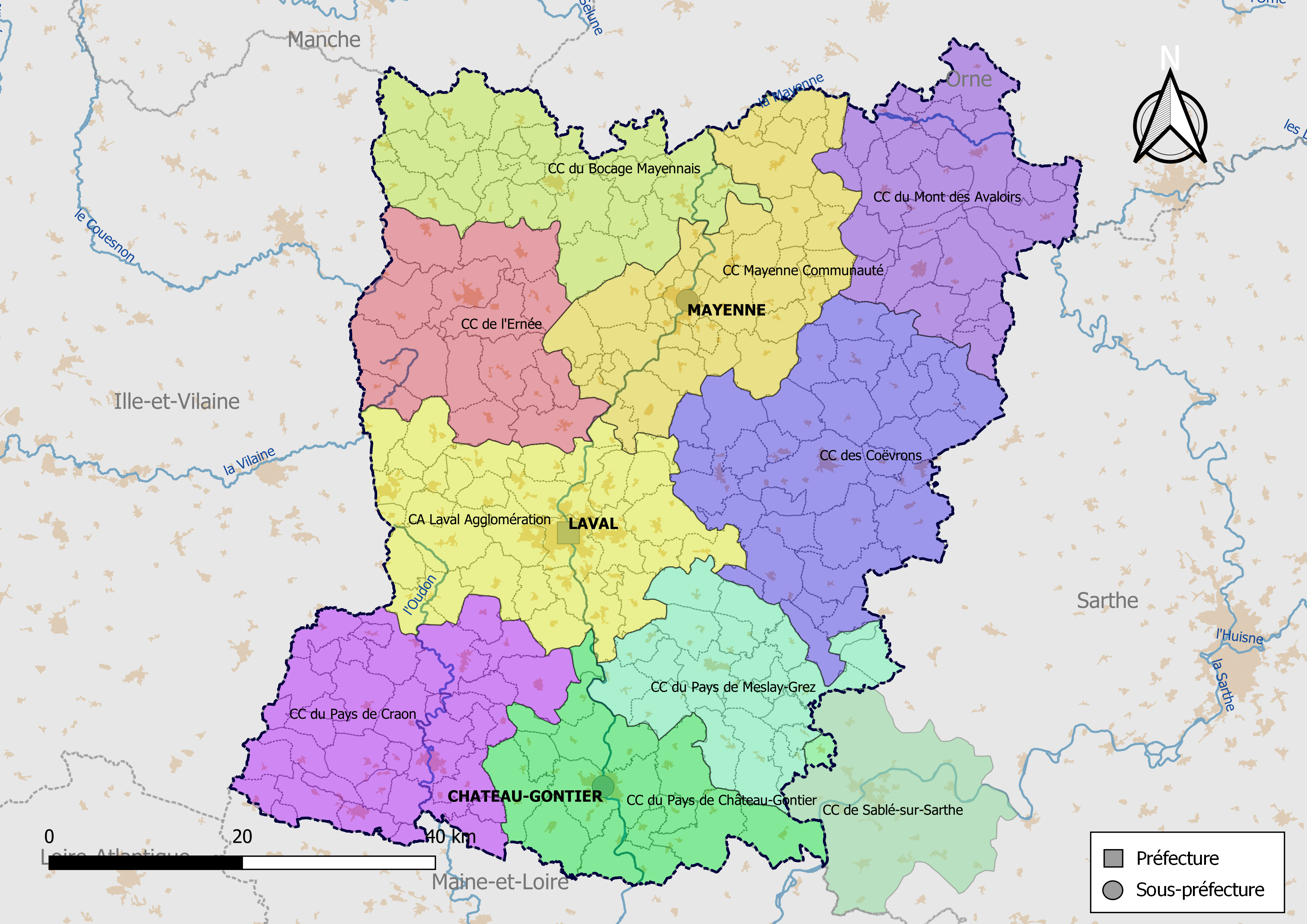
- Location within the Mayenne department (yellow)
- Country: France
- Region: Pays de la Loire
- Department: Mayenne
- No. of communes: {{{nbcomm}}}
- Established: 2019
- Area: 686.1 km^{2} (264.9 sq mi)
- Population (2018): 113,854
  - Density: 165.9/km^{2} (429.8/sq mi)
- Website: www.agglo-laval.fr

Laval Agglomération is the communauté d'agglomération, an intercommunal structure, centred on the city of Laval. It is located in the Mayenne department, in the Pays de la Loire region, western France. It was created in 2001 as the Communauté d'agglomération de Laval. It was merged with the former communauté de communes du Pays de Loiron to form the communauté d'agglomération Laval Agglomération on 1 January 2019. Its area is 686.1 km^{2}. Its population was 113,854 in 2016, of which 49,573 in Laval proper.

== Composition ==
The communauté d'agglomération consists of the following 34 communes:

1. Ahuillé
2. Argentré
3. Beaulieu-sur-Oudon
4. Bonchamp-lès-Laval
5. Le Bourgneuf-la-Forêt
6. Bourgon
7. La Brûlatte
8. Châlons-du-Maine
9. Changé
10. La Chapelle-Anthenaise
11. Entrammes
12. Forcé
13. Le Genest-Saint-Isle
14. La Gravelle
15. L'Huisserie
16. Launay-Villiers
17. Laval
18. Loiron-Ruillé
19. Louverné
20. Louvigné
21. Montflours
22. Montigné-le-Brillant
23. Montjean
24. Nuillé-sur-Vicoin
25. Olivet
26. Parné-sur-Roc
27. Port-Brillet
28. Saint-Berthevin
29. Saint-Cyr-le-Gravelais
30. Saint-Germain-le-Fouilloux
31. Saint-Jean-sur-Mayenne
32. Saint-Ouën-des-Toits
33. Saint-Pierre-la-Cour
34. Soulgé-sur-Ouette

== See also ==
- Agglomeration communities in France
