= Nuillé-sur-Vicoin =

- Commune
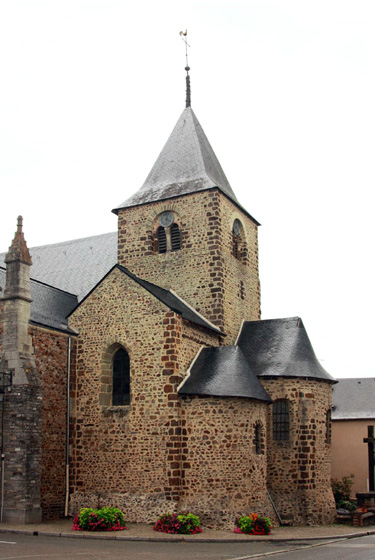
- The church of Sainte-Trinité, in Nuillé-sur-Vicoin

- Coat of arms
- Location of Nuillé-sur-Vicoin
- Location within France Location within Pays de la Loire
- Coordinates: 47°59′09″N 0°46′57″W
- Country: France
- Region: Pays de la Loire
- Department: Mayenne
- Arrondissement: Laval
- Canton: L'Huisserie
- Intercommunality: Laval Agglomération

Government
  - Mayor (2020–2026): Mickaël Marquet
- Area^{1}: 23.59 km^{2} (9.11 sq mi)
- Elevation: 60 m (200 ft)
- Highest elevation: 108 m (354 ft)
- Lowest elevation: 37 m (121 ft)
- Population (2023): 1,247
  - Density: 52.86/km^{2} (136.9/sq mi)
- Time zone: UTC+01:00 (CET)
  - Summer (DST): UTC+02:00 (CEST)
- INSEE/Postal code: 53168 /53970
- ^{1} French Land Register data, which excludes lakes, ponds, glaciers > 1 km^{2} (0.386 sq mi or 247 acres) and river estuaries.

Nuillé-sur-Vicoin (French pronunciation: [nɥije syʁ vikwɛ̃]) is a commune in the Mayenne department in north-western France.

== See also ==
- Communes of Mayenne
