= Sacé =

- Commune
- Location of Sacé
- Location within France Location within Pays de la Loire
- Coordinates: 48°11′11″N 0°42′43″W
- Country: France
- Region: Pays de la Loire
- Department: Mayenne
- Arrondissement: Mayenne
- Canton: Bonchamp-lès-Laval

Government
  - Mayor (2020–2026): Antoine Valprémit
- Area^{1}: 12.46 km^{2} (4.81 sq mi)
- Elevation: 210 m (690 ft)
- Highest elevation: 142 m (466 ft)
- Lowest elevation: 62 m (203 ft)
- Population (2023): 472
  - Density: 37.9/km^{2} (98.1/sq mi)
- Time zone: UTC+01:00 (CET)
  - Summer (DST): UTC+02:00 (CEST)
- INSEE/Postal code: 53195 /53470
- ^{1} French Land Register data, which excludes lakes, ponds, glaciers > 1 km^{2} (0.386 sq mi or 247 acres) and river estuaries.

Sacé (French pronunciation: [sase]) is a commune in the Mayenne department in north-western France.

== See also ==
- Communes of Mayenne
