= La Chapelle-Anthenaise =

- Commune
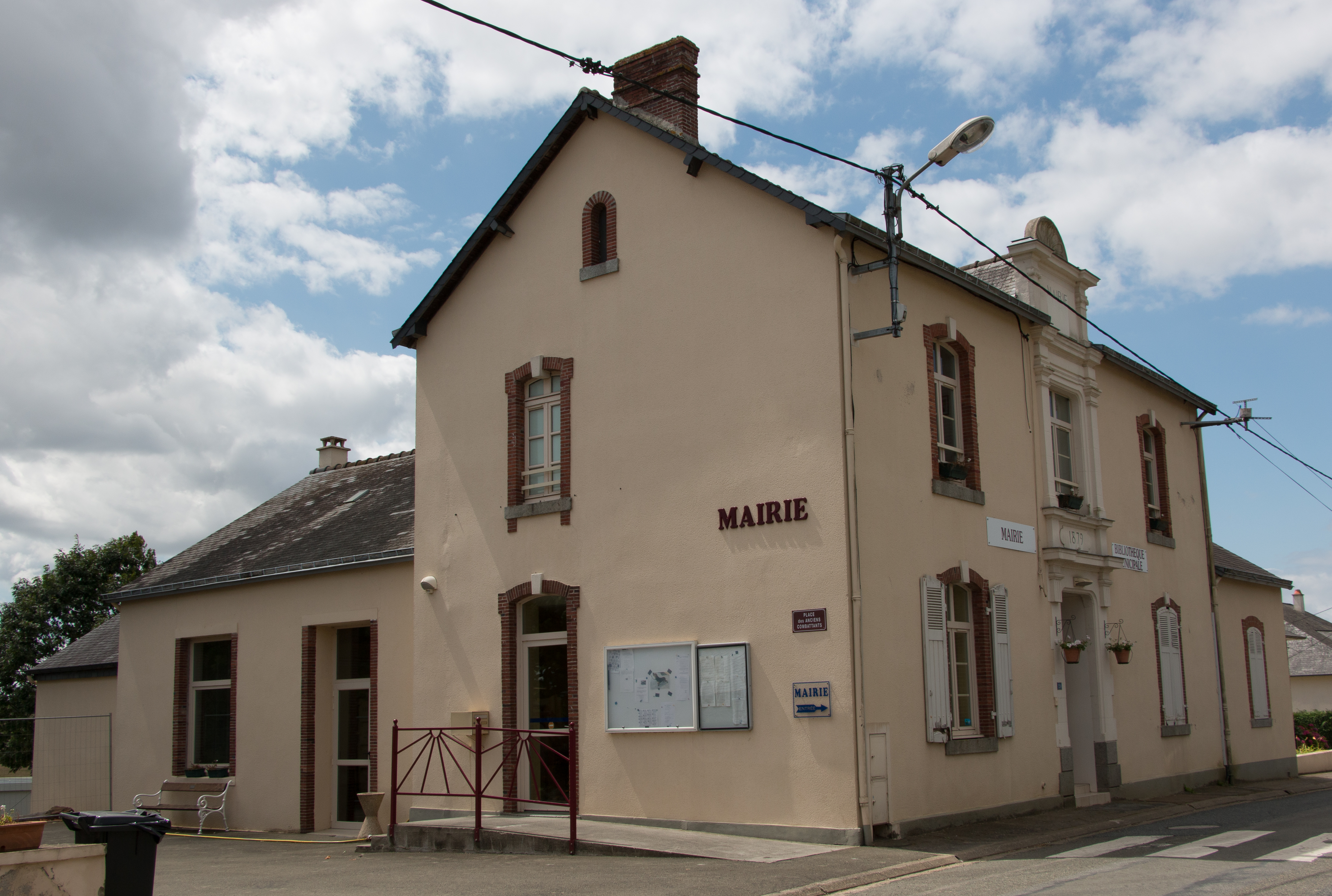
- Town hall
- Location of La Chapelle-Anthenaise
- Location within France Location within Pays de la Loire
- Coordinates: 48°07′24″N 0°40′34″W
- Country: France
- Region: Pays de la Loire
- Department: Mayenne
- Arrondissement: Laval
- Canton: Bonchamp-lès-Laval
- Intercommunality: Laval Agglomération

Government
  - Mayor (2020–2026): Isabelle Fougeray
- Area^{1}: 19.89 km^{2} (7.68 sq mi)
- Elevation: 138 m (453 ft)
- Highest elevation: 147 m (482 ft)
- Lowest elevation: 77 m (253 ft)
- Population (2023): 970
  - Density: 49/km^{2} (130/sq mi)
- Time zone: UTC+01:00 (CET)
  - Summer (DST): UTC+02:00 (CEST)
- INSEE/Postal code: 53056 /53950
- ^{1} French Land Register data, which excludes lakes, ponds, glaciers > 1 km^{2} (0.386 sq mi or 247 acres) and river estuaries.

La Chapelle-Anthenaise (French pronunciation: [la ʃapɛl ɑ̃tnɛz]) is a commune in the Mayenne department in north-western France.

== Demographic evolution ==
Historical population
Year	Pop.	±% p.a.
1968	419	—
1975	407	−0.41%
1982	570	+4.93%
1990	661	+1.87%
1999	657	−0.07%
2007	864	+3.48%
2012	922	+1.31%
2017	1,014	+1.92%
2023	970	−0.74%
Source: INSEE

== See also ==
- Communes of the Mayenne department
