= Soulgé-sur-Ouette =

- Commune
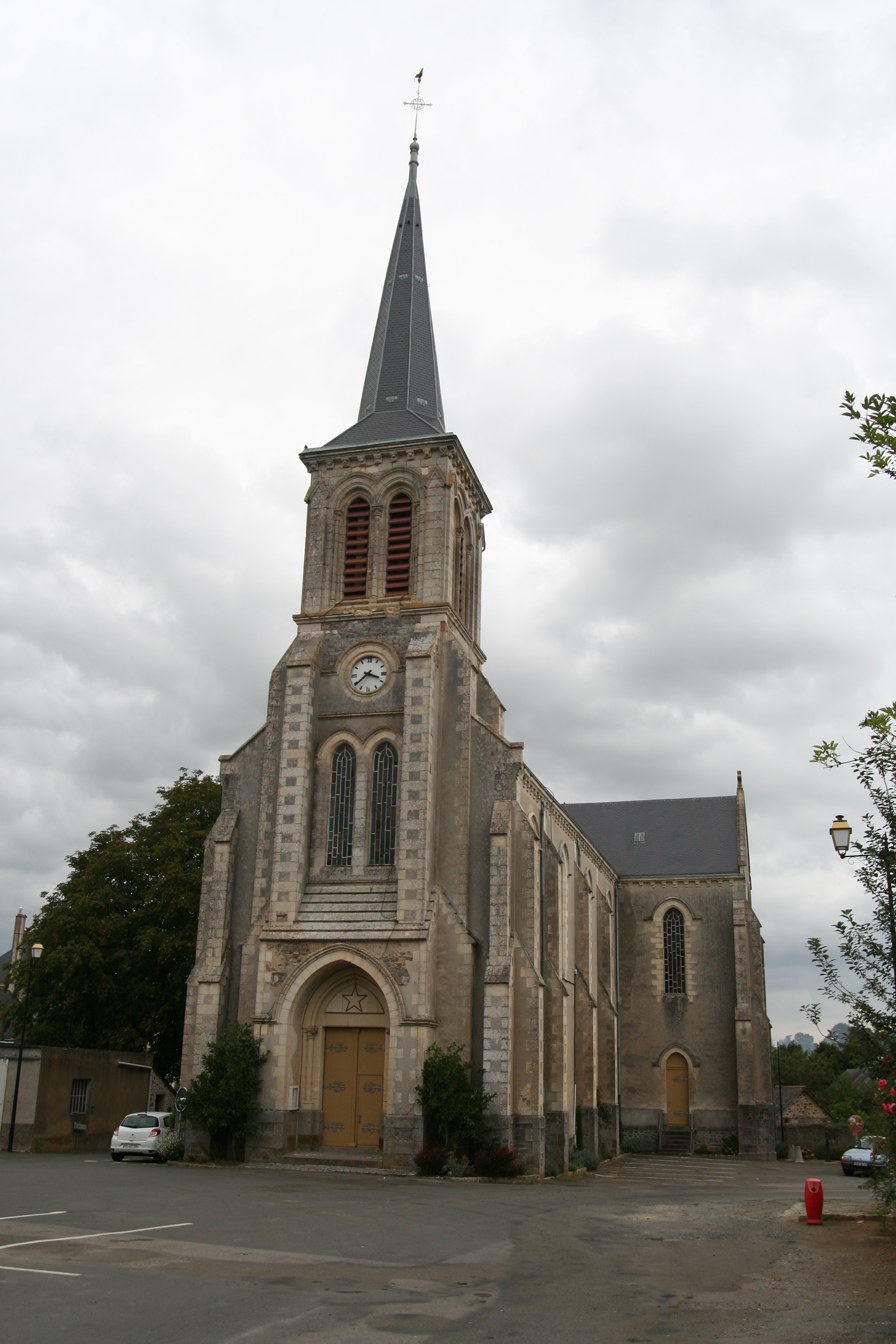
- The church of Saint-Médard, in Soulgé-sur-Ouette
- Location of Soulgé-sur-Ouette
- Location within France Location within Pays de la Loire
- Coordinates: 48°03′40″N 0°34′08″W
- Country: France
- Region: Pays de la Loire
- Department: Mayenne
- Arrondissement: Laval
- Canton: L'Huisserie
- Intercommunality: Laval Agglomération

Government
  - Mayor (2020–2026): Michel Rocherullé
- Area^{1}: 22.94 km^{2} (8.86 sq mi)
- Elevation: 100 m (330 ft)
- Highest elevation: 124 m (407 ft)
- Lowest elevation: 74 m (243 ft)
- Population (2023): 1,063
  - Density: 46.34/km^{2} (120.0/sq mi)
- Time zone: UTC+01:00 (CET)
  - Summer (DST): UTC+02:00 (CEST)
- INSEE/Postal code: 53262 /53210
- ^{1} French Land Register data, which excludes lakes, ponds, glaciers > 1 km^{2} (0.386 sq mi or 247 acres) and river estuaries.

Soulgé-sur-Ouette (French pronunciation: [sulʒe syʁ wɛt]) is a commune in the Mayenne department in north-western France.

== See also ==
- Communes of the Mayenne department
- Ouette
