= La Brûlatte =

- Commune
- Coat of arms
- Location of La Brûlatte
- Location within France Location within Pays de la Loire
- Coordinates: 48°05′10″N 0°57′07″W
- Country: France
- Region: Pays de la Loire
- Department: Mayenne
- Arrondissement: Laval
- Canton: Loiron-Ruillé
- Intercommunality: Laval Agglomération

Government
  - Mayor (2020–2026): Jean-Louis Deulofeu
- Area^{1}: 15.24 km^{2} (5.88 sq mi)
- Elevation: 111 m (364 ft)
- Highest elevation: 191 m (627 ft)
- Lowest elevation: 92 m (302 ft)
- Population (2023): 673
  - Density: 44.2/km^{2} (114/sq mi)
- Time zone: UTC+01:00 (CET)
  - Summer (DST): UTC+02:00 (CEST)
- INSEE/Postal code: 53045 /53410
- ^{1} French Land Register data, which excludes lakes, ponds, glaciers > 1 km^{2} (0.386 sq mi or 247 acres) and river estuaries.

La Brûlatte (French pronunciation: [la bʁylat]) is a commune in the Mayenne department in northwestern France.

== Population ==
Historical population
Year	Pop.	±% p.a.
1968	373	—
1975	437	+2.29%
1982	595	+4.51%
1990	622	+0.56%
1999	607	−0.27%
2007	695	+1.71%
2012	697	+0.06%
2017	697	+0.00%
2023	673	−0.58%
Source: INSEE

== See also ==
- Communes of Mayenne
