= Gesnes =

- Commune
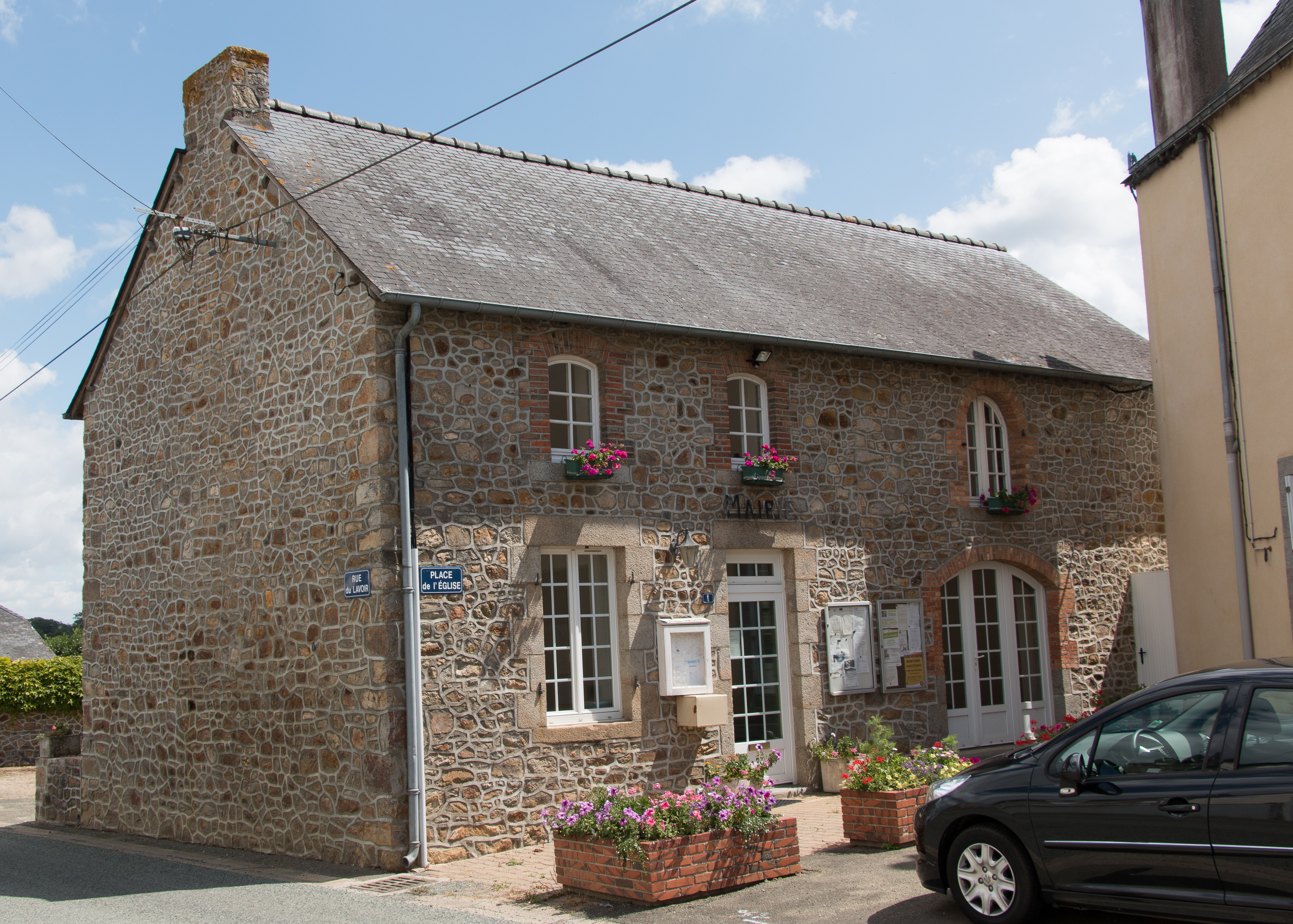
- Town hall
- Location of Gesnes
- Location within France Location within Pays de la Loire
- Coordinates: 48°08′52″N 0°35′02″W
- Country: France
- Region: Pays de la Loire
- Department: Mayenne
- Arrondissement: Mayenne
- Canton: Bonchamp-lès-Laval

Government
  - Mayor (2020–2026): Gérard Papillon
- Area^{1}: 11.21 km^{2} (4.33 sq mi)
- Elevation: 72 m (236 ft)
- Highest elevation: 123 m (404 ft)
- Lowest elevation: 67 m (220 ft)
- Population (2023): 249
  - Density: 22.2/km^{2} (57.5/sq mi)
- Time zone: UTC+01:00 (CET)
  - Summer (DST): UTC+02:00 (CEST)
- INSEE/Postal code: 53105 /53150
- ^{1} French Land Register data, which excludes lakes, ponds, glaciers > 1 km^{2} (0.386 sq mi or 247 acres) and river estuaries.

Gesnes (French pronunciation: [ʒɛn]) is a commune in the Mayenne department in north-western France.

== See also ==
- Communes of the Mayenne department
