= Le Genest-Saint-Isle =

- Commune
- Coat of arms
- Location of Le Genest-Saint-Isle
- Location within France Location within Pays de la Loire
- Coordinates: 48°05′57″N 0°53′16″W
- Country: France
- Region: Pays de la Loire
- Department: Mayenne
- Arrondissement: Laval
- Canton: Loiron-Ruillé
- Intercommunality: Laval Agglomération

Government
  - Mayor (2020–2026): Nicole Bouillon
- Area^{1}: 18.59 km^{2} (7.18 sq mi)
- Elevation: 92 m (302 ft)
- Highest elevation: 166 m (545 ft)
- Lowest elevation: 82 m (269 ft)
- Population (2023): 2,166
  - Density: 116.5/km^{2} (301.8/sq mi)
- Time zone: UTC+01:00 (CET)
  - Summer (DST): UTC+02:00 (CEST)
- INSEE/Postal code: 53103 /53940
- ^{1} French Land Register data, which excludes lakes, ponds, glaciers > 1 km^{2} (0.386 sq mi or 247 acres) and river estuaries.

Le Genest-Saint-Isle (French pronunciation: [lə ʒənɛ sɛ̃.t‿il]) is a commune in the Mayenne department in north-western France.

== Population ==
Historical population
Year	Pop.	±% p.a.
1968	868	—
1975	1,231	+5.12%
1982	1,664	+4.40%
1990	1,877	+1.52%
1999	1,907	+0.18%
2007	2,032	+0.80%
2012	2,098	+0.64%
2017	2,135	+0.35%
2023	2,166	+0.24%
Source: INSEE

== See also ==
- Communes of the Mayenne department
