= Châlons-du-Maine =

- Commune
- Location of Châlons-du-Maine
- Location within France Location within Pays de la Loire
- Coordinates: 48°09′50″N 0°38′32″W
- Country: France
- Region: Pays de la Loire
- Department: Mayenne
- Arrondissement: Laval
- Canton: Bonchamp-lès-Laval
- Intercommunality: Laval Agglomération

Government
  - Mayor (2020–2026): Loïc Broussey
- Area^{1}: 9.66 km^{2} (3.73 sq mi)
- Elevation: 109 m (358 ft)
- Highest elevation: 152 m (499 ft)
- Lowest elevation: 99 m (325 ft)
- Population (2023): 682
  - Density: 70.6/km^{2} (183/sq mi)
- Time zone: UTC+01:00 (CET)
  - Summer (DST): UTC+02:00 (CEST)
- INSEE/Postal code: 53049 /53470
- ^{1} French Land Register data, which excludes lakes, ponds, glaciers > 1 km^{2} (0.386 sq mi or 247 acres) and river estuaries.

Châlons-du-Maine (French pronunciation: [ʃalɔ̃ dy mɛn]) is a commune in the Mayenne department in north-western France.

== See also ==
- Communes of Mayenne
