= Saint-Ouën-des-Toits =

- Commune
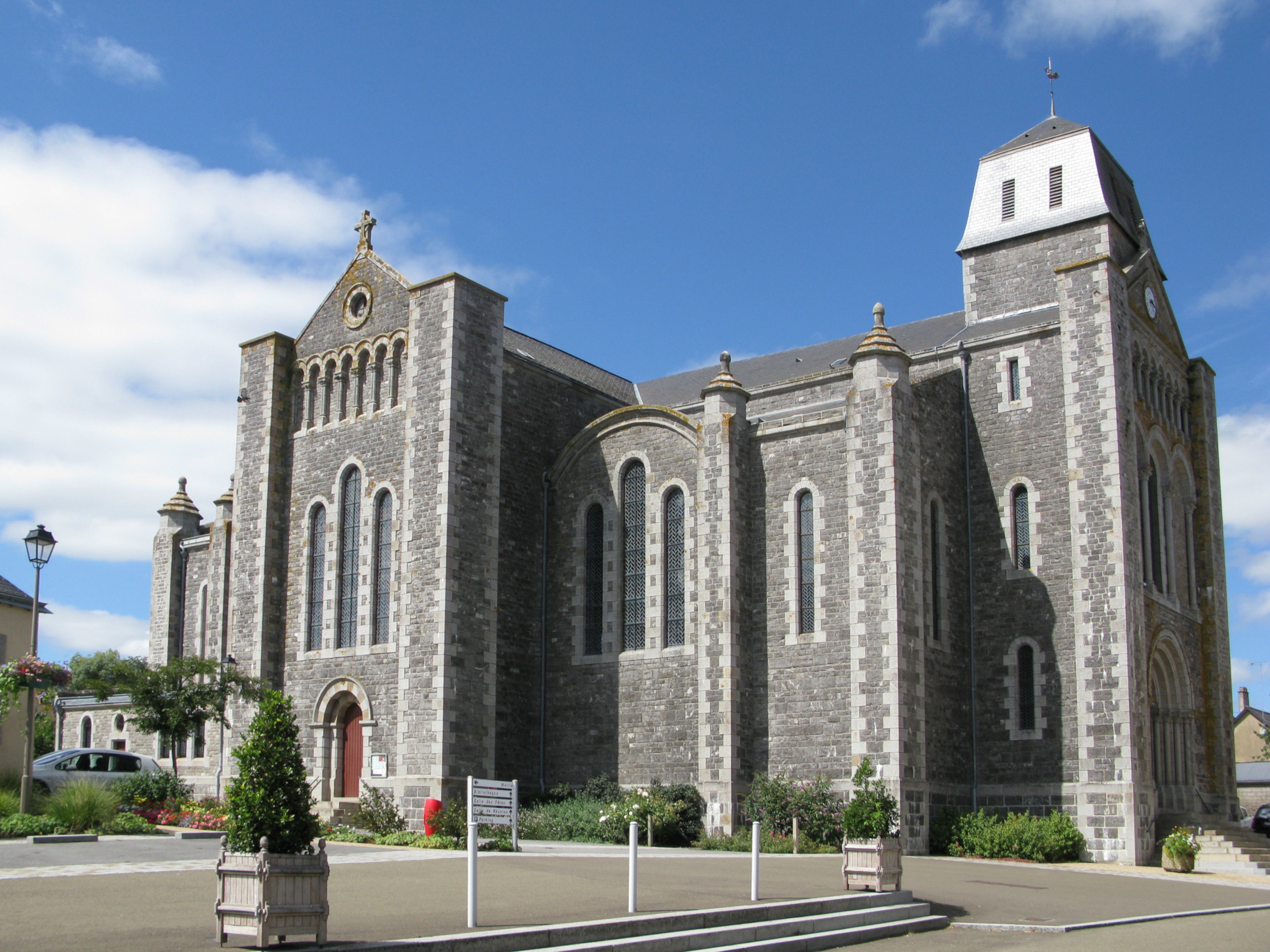
- The church in Saint-Ouën-des-Toits
- Location of Saint-Ouën-des-Toits
- Location within France Location within Pays de la Loire
- Coordinates: 48°08′20″N 0°54′11″W
- Country: France
- Region: Pays de la Loire
- Department: Mayenne
- Arrondissement: Laval
- Canton: Loiron-Ruillé
- Intercommunality: Laval Agglomération

Government
  - Mayor (2020–2026): Dominique Gallacier
- Area^{1}: 21.26 km^{2} (8.21 sq mi)
- Elevation: 137 m (449 ft)
- Highest elevation: 181 m (594 ft)
- Lowest elevation: 118 m (387 ft)
- Population (2023): 1,785
  - Density: 83.96/km^{2} (217.5/sq mi)
- Time zone: UTC+01:00 (CET)
  - Summer (DST): UTC+02:00 (CEST)
- INSEE/Postal code: 53243 /53410
- ^{1} French Land Register data, which excludes lakes, ponds, glaciers > 1 km^{2} (0.386 sq mi or 247 acres) and river estuaries.

Saint-Ouën-des-Toits (French pronunciation: [sɛ̃.t‿wɛ̃ de twa]) is a commune in the Mayenne department in north-western France.

== See also ==
- Communes of the Mayenne department
