= Saint-Berthevin =

- Commune
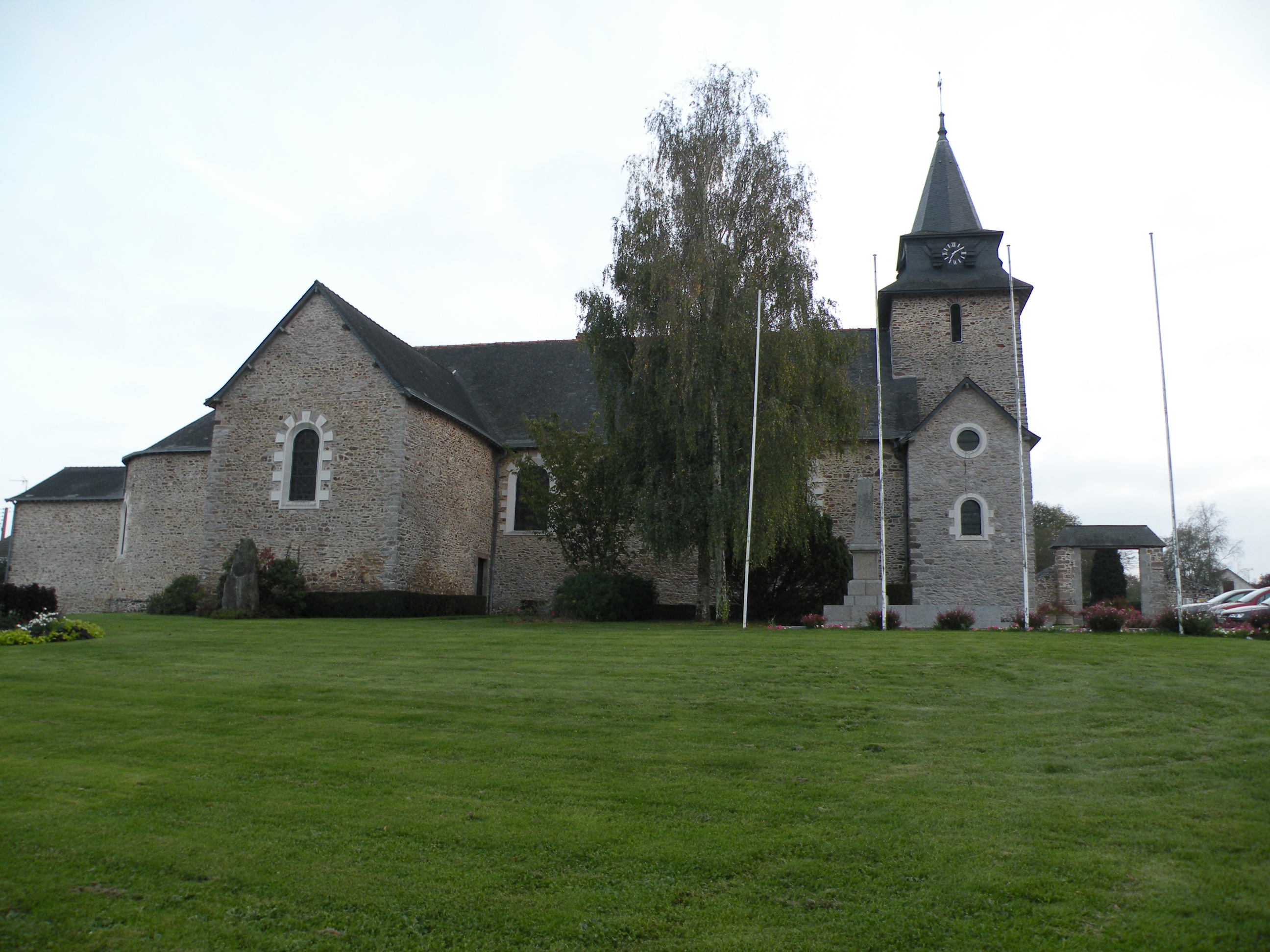
- The church in Saint-Berthevin

- Coat of arms
- Location of Saint-Berthevin
- Location within France Location within Pays de la Loire
- Coordinates: 48°04′09″N 0°49′28″W
- Country: France
- Region: Pays de la Loire
- Department: Mayenne
- Arrondissement: Laval
- Canton: Saint-Berthevin
- Intercommunality: Laval Agglomération

Government
  - Mayor (2020–2026): Yannick Borde
- Area^{1}: 32.11 km^{2} (12.40 sq mi)
- Elevation: 98 m (322 ft)
- Highest elevation: 149 m (489 ft)
- Lowest elevation: 62 m (203 ft)
- Population (2023): 7,479
  - Density: 232.9/km^{2} (603.3/sq mi)
- Time zone: UTC+01:00 (CET)
  - Summer (DST): UTC+02:00 (CEST)
- INSEE/Postal code: 53201 /53940
- ^{1} French Land Register data, which excludes lakes, ponds, glaciers > 1 km^{2} (0.386 sq mi or 247 acres) and river estuaries.

Saint-Berthevin (French pronunciation: [sɛ̃ bɛʁtəvɛ̃]) is a commune in the Mayenne department in north-western France.

== Population ==
Historical population
Year	Pop.	±% p.a.
1968	2,289	—
1975	4,897	+11.48%
1982	5,624	+2.00%
1990	6,382	+1.59%
1999	6,873	+0.83%
2007	6,964	+0.16%
2012	7,307	+0.97%
2017	7,344	+0.10%
2023	7,479	+0.30%
Source: INSEE

== Sights ==
- 11th century Saint-Berthevin church.
- Lime kilns at Les Brosses, listed as a Historic Monument.
- High rock, named the Chair of Saint-Berthevin.
- Coupeau base.
- Old pink marble quarries (Saint-Berthevin marble).
- Chateau du Chatelier.
- Two 18th century boundary stones are classified as historic objects.

== See also ==
- Communes of Mayenne
