= Louverné =

- Commune
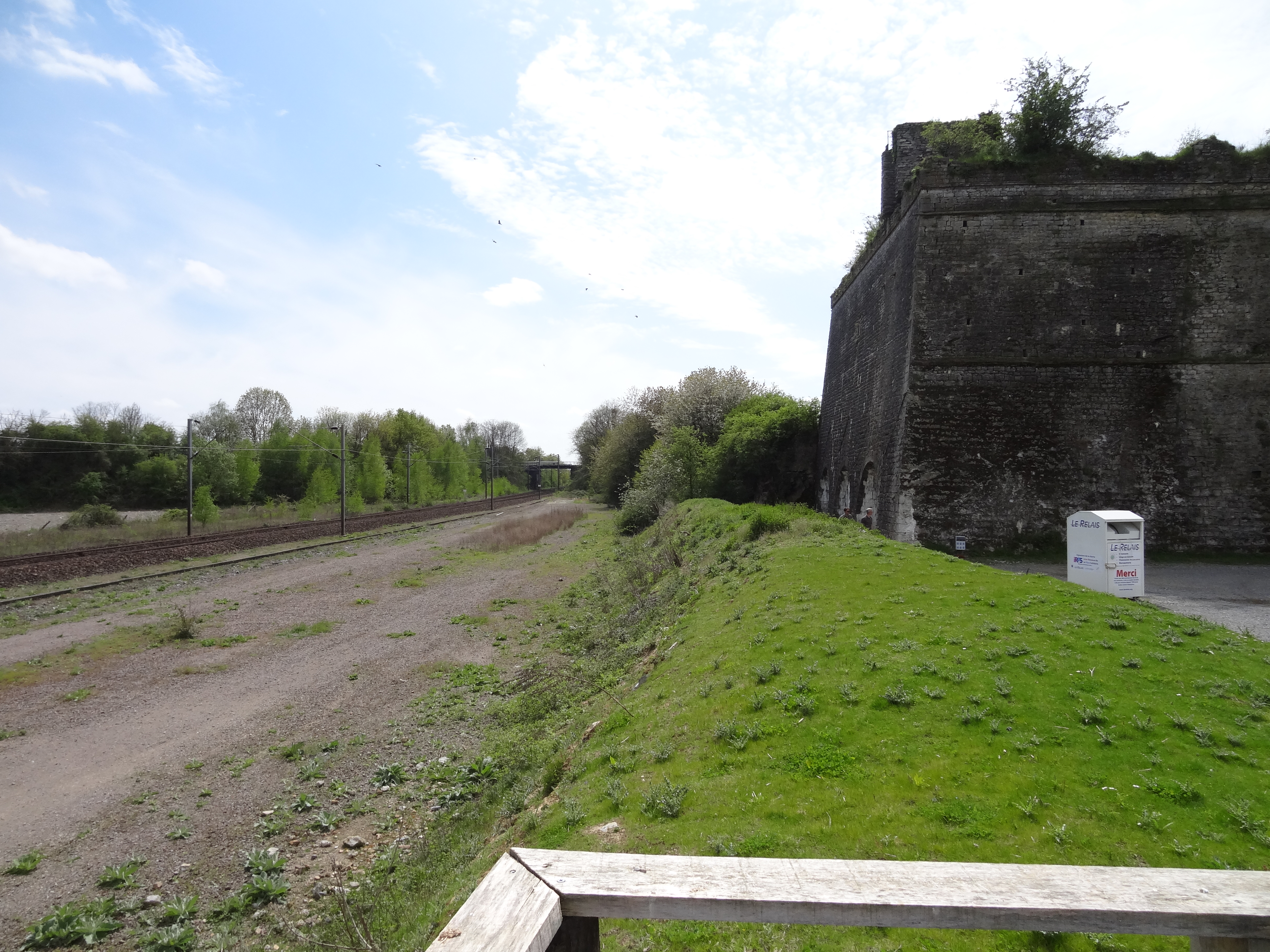
- The old lime kiln at the railway station
- Location of Louverné
- Location within France Location within Pays de la Loire
- Coordinates: 48°07′25″N 0°43′01″W
- Country: France
- Region: Pays de la Loire
- Department: Mayenne
- Arrondissement: Laval
- Canton: Bonchamp-lès-Laval
- Intercommunality: Laval Agglomération

Government
  - Mayor (2020–2026): Sylvie Vielle
- Area^{1}: 20.58 km^{2} (7.95 sq mi)
- Elevation: 79 m (259 ft)
- Highest elevation: 138 m (453 ft)
- Lowest elevation: 58 m (190 ft)
- Population (2023): 4,344
  - Density: 211.1/km^{2} (546.7/sq mi)
- Time zone: UTC+01:00 (CET)
  - Summer (DST): UTC+02:00 (CEST)
- INSEE/Postal code: 53140 /53950
- ^{1} French Land Register data, which excludes lakes, ponds, glaciers > 1 km^{2} (0.386 sq mi or 247 acres) and river estuaries.

Louverné (French pronunciation: [luvɛʁne]) is a commune in the Mayenne department in north-western France.

== Population ==
Historical population
Year	Pop.	±% p.a.
1968	1,215	—
1975	1,808	+5.84%
1982	2,536	+4.95%
1990	2,679	+0.69%
1999	2,912	+0.93%
2007	3,721	+3.11%
2012	3,991	+1.41%
2017	4,302	+1.51%
2023	4,344	+0.16%
Source: INSEE

== See also ==
- Communes of the Mayenne department
