= Saint-Jean-sur-Mayenne =

- Commune
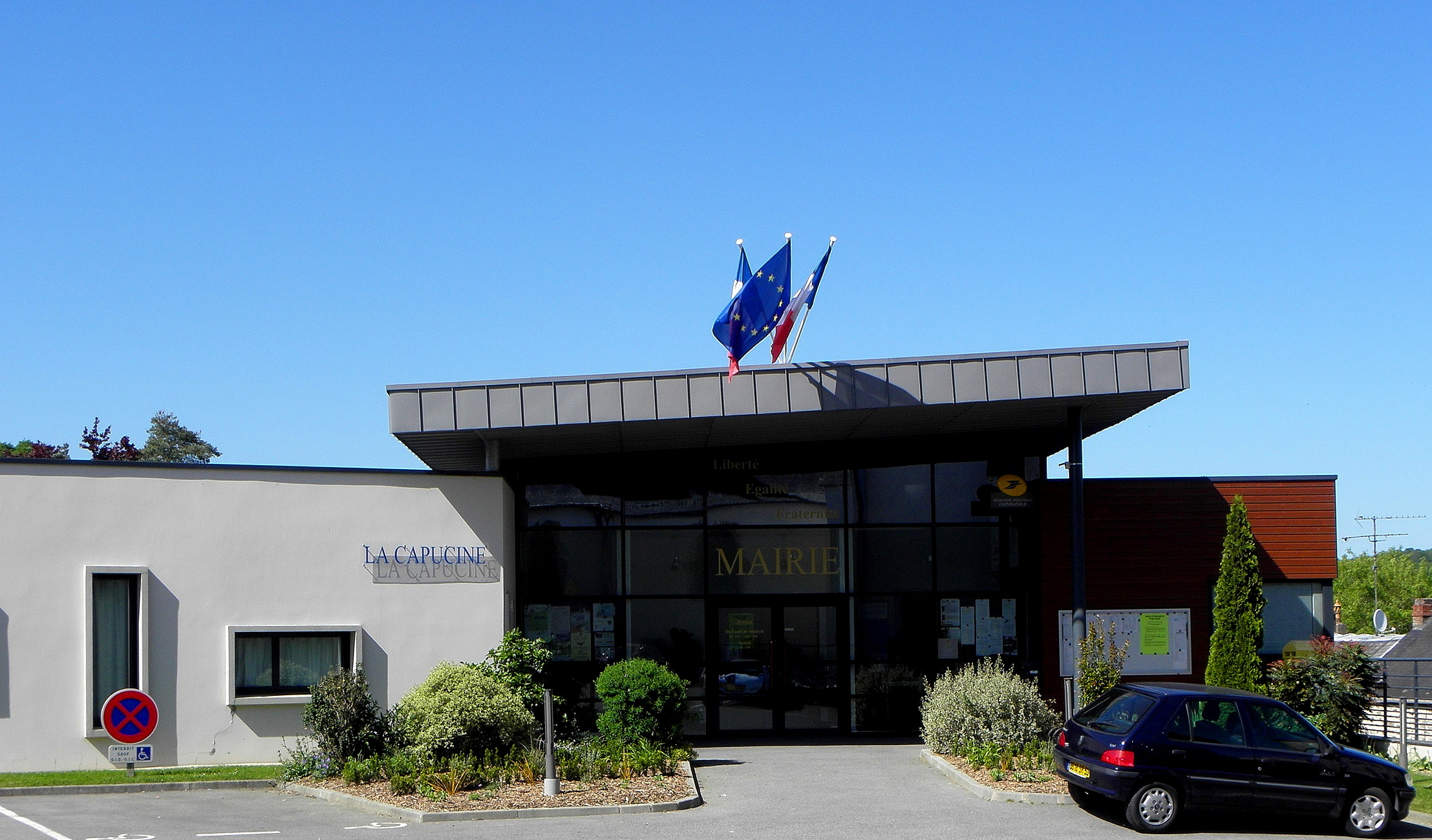
- Saint-Jean-sur-Mayenne Town Hall
- Location of Saint-Jean-sur-Mayenne
- Location within France Location within Pays de la Loire
- Coordinates: 48°08′02″N 0°45′04″W
- Country: France
- Region: Pays de la Loire
- Department: Mayenne
- Arrondissement: Laval
- Canton: Saint-Berthevin
- Intercommunality: Laval Agglomération

Government
  - Mayor (2020–2026): Olivier Barré
- Area^{1}: 17.81 km^{2} (6.88 sq mi)
- Elevation: 153 m (502 ft)
- Highest elevation: 138 m (453 ft)
- Lowest elevation: 47 m (154 ft)
- Population (2023): 1,732
  - Density: 97.25/km^{2} (251.9/sq mi)
- Time zone: UTC+01:00 (CET)
  - Summer (DST): UTC+02:00 (CEST)
- INSEE/Postal code: 53229 /53240
- ^{1} French Land Register data, which excludes lakes, ponds, glaciers > 1 km^{2} (0.386 sq mi or 247 acres) and river estuaries.

Saint-Jean-sur-Mayenne (French pronunciation: [sɛ̃ ʒɑ̃ syʁ majɛn], literally Saint-Jean on Mayenne) is a commune in the Mayenne department in north-western France.

== See also ==
- Communes of the Mayenne department
