= Beaulieu-sur-Oudon =

- Commune
- Location of Beaulieu-sur-Oudon
- Location within France Location within Pays de la Loire
- Coordinates: 48°00′18″N 0°59′33″W
- Country: France
- Region: Pays de la Loire
- Department: Mayenne
- Arrondissement: Laval
- Canton: Loiron-Ruillé
- Intercommunality: Laval Agglomération

Government
  - Mayor (2020–2026): Anthony Roullier
- Area^{1}: 19.73 km^{2} (7.62 sq mi)
- Elevation: 100 m (330 ft)
- Highest elevation: 140 m (460 ft)
- Lowest elevation: 67 m (220 ft)
- Population (2023): 483
  - Density: 24.5/km^{2} (63.4/sq mi)
- Time zone: UTC+01:00 (CET)
  - Summer (DST): UTC+02:00 (CEST)
- INSEE/Postal code: 53026 /53320
- ^{1} French Land Register data, which excludes lakes, ponds, glaciers > 1 km^{2} (0.386 sq mi or 247 acres) and river estuaries.

Beaulieu-sur-Oudon (French pronunciation: [boljø syʁ udɔ̃], literally Beaulieu on Oudon) is a commune in the Mayenne department in northwestern France.

== Geography ==
The river Oudon flows through the commune and forms part of its southeastern border.

== Population ==
Historical population
Year	Pop.	±% p.a.
1968	533	—
1975	473	−1.69%
1982	440	−1.03%
1990	380	−1.82%
1999	401	+0.60%
2007	510	+3.05%
2012	488	−0.88%
2017	519	+1.24%
2023	483	−1.19%
Source: INSEE

== See also ==
- Communes of Mayenne
