= Bonchamp-lès-Laval =

- Commune
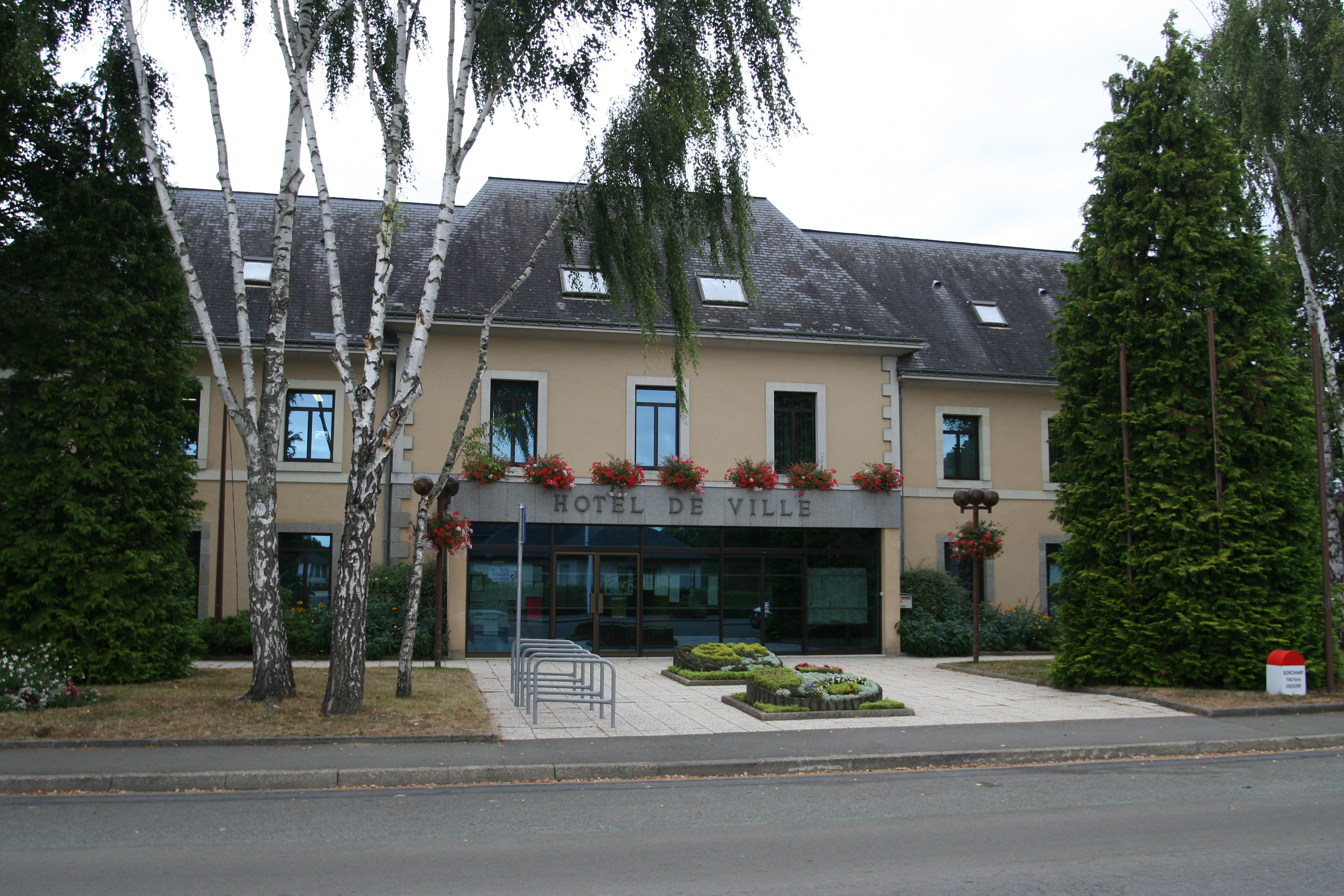
- The town hall in Bonchamp-lès-Laval
- Location of Bonchamp-lès-Laval
- Location within France Location within Pays de la Loire
- Coordinates: 48°04′30″N 0°42′00″W
- Country: France
- Region: Pays de la Loire
- Department: Mayenne
- Arrondissement: Laval
- Canton: Bonchamp-lès-Laval
- Intercommunality: Laval Agglomération

Government
  - Mayor (2020–2026): Gwénaël Poisson
- Area^{1}: 27.51 km^{2} (10.62 sq mi)
- Elevation: 82 m (269 ft)
- Highest elevation: 113 m (371 ft)
- Lowest elevation: 47 m (154 ft)
- Population (2023): 6,302
  - Density: 229.1/km^{2} (593.3/sq mi)
- Time zone: UTC+01:00 (CET)
  - Summer (DST): UTC+02:00 (CEST)
- INSEE/Postal code: 53034 /53960
- ^{1} French Land Register data, which excludes lakes, ponds, glaciers > 1 km^{2} (0.386 sq mi or 247 acres) and river estuaries.

Bonchamp-lès-Laval (French pronunciation: [bɔ̃ʃɑ̃ lɛ laval], lit. 'Bonchamp near Laval') is a commune in the Mayenne department in northwestern France.

== Population ==
Historical population

| Year | Pop. | ±% p.a. |
|---|---|---|
| 1793 | 1,235 | — |
| 1800 | 873 | −4.83% |
| 1806 | 1,219 | +5.72% |
| 1821 | 1,144 | −0.42% |
| 1831 | 1,167 | +0.20% |
| 1836 | 1,227 | +1.01% |
| 1841 | 1,275 | +0.77% |
| 1846 | 1,283 | +0.13% |
| 1851 | 1,290 | +0.11% |
| 1856 | 1,291 | +0.02% |
| 1861 | 1,262 | −0.45% |
| 1866 | 1,252 | −0.16% |
| 1872 | 1,152 | −1.38% |
| 1876 | 1,182 | +0.64% |
| 1881 | 1,146 | −0.62% |
| 1886 | 1,102 | −0.78% |
| 1891 | 1,032 | −1.30% |
| 1896 | 959 | −1.46% |
| 1901 | 939 | −0.42% |

| Year | Pop. | ±% p.a. |
|---|---|---|
| 1906 | 949 | +0.21% |
| 1911 | 914 | −0.75% |
| 1921 | 788 | −1.47% |
| 1926 | 745 | −1.12% |
| 1931 | 780 | +0.92% |
| 1936 | 788 | +0.20% |
| 1946 | 839 | +0.63% |
| 1954 | 831 | −0.12% |
| 1962 | 815 | −0.24% |
| 1968 | 1,387 | +9.27% |
| 1975 | 2,235 | +7.05% |
| 1982 | 3,444 | +6.37% |
| 1990 | 3,832 | +1.34% |
| 1999 | 4,793 | +2.52% |
| 2007 | 5,553 | +1.86% |
| 2012 | 5,795 | +0.86% |
| 2017 | 6,037 | +0.82% |
| 2023 | 6,302 | +0.72% |

Source: EHESS and INSEE (1968-2023)

== See also ==
- Communes of Mayenne
