= Olivet, Mayenne =

Olivet
- Commune
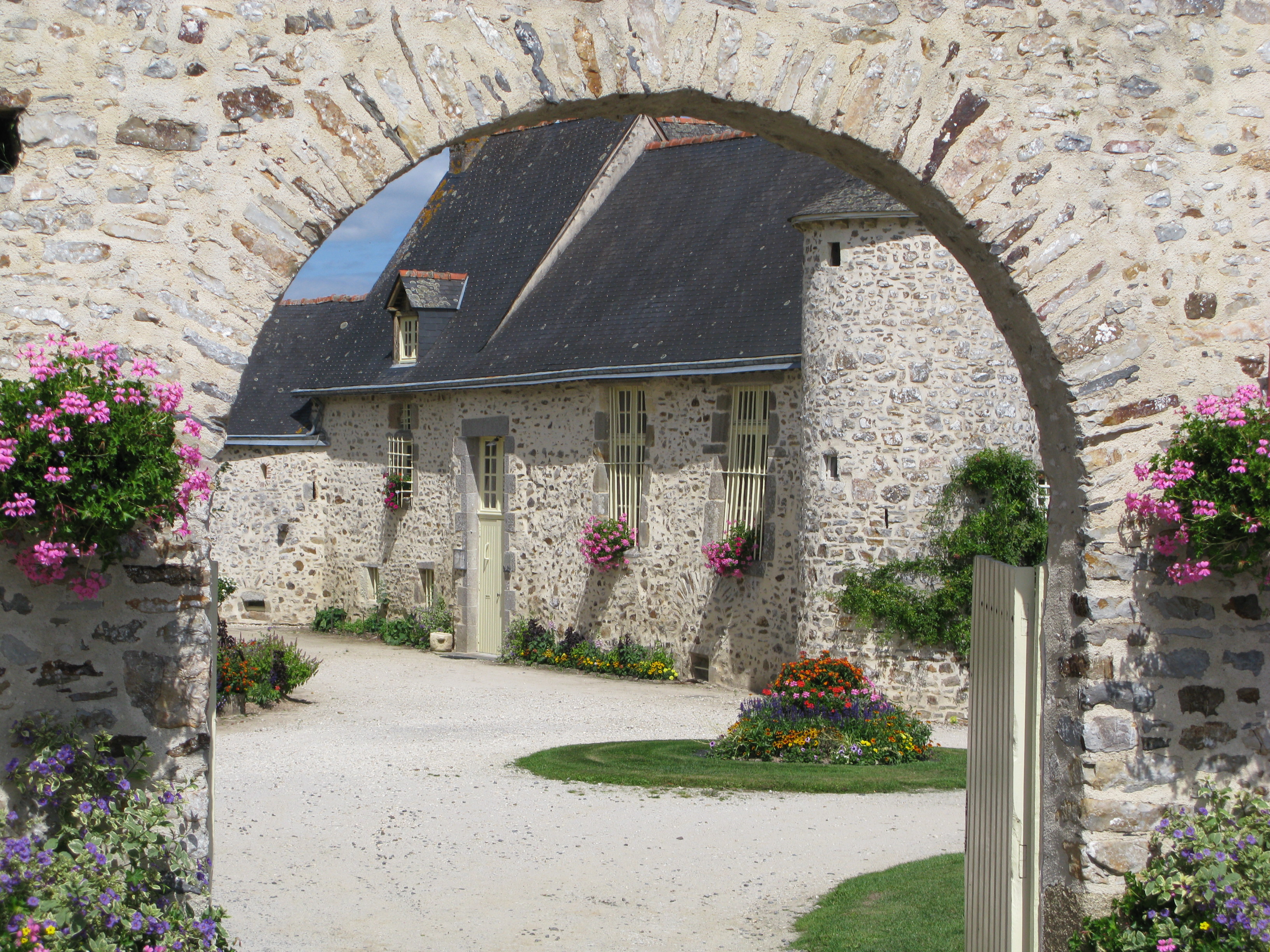
- The town hall in Olivet
- Location of Olivet
- Location within France Location within Pays de la Loire
- Coordinates: 48°07′19″N 0°55′00″W
- Country: France
- Region: Pays de la Loire
- Department: Mayenne
- Arrondissement: Laval
- Canton: Loiron-Ruillé
- Intercommunality: Laval Agglomération

Government
  - Mayor (2020–2026): Éric Morand
- Area^{1}: 9.97 km^{2} (3.85 sq mi)
- Elevation: 130 m (430 ft)
- Highest elevation: 165 m (541 ft)
- Lowest elevation: 92 m (302 ft)
- Population (2023): 404
  - Density: 40.5/km^{2} (105/sq mi)
- Time zone: UTC+01:00 (CET)
  - Summer (DST): UTC+02:00 (CEST)
- INSEE/Postal code: 53169 /53410
- ^{1} French Land Register data, which excludes lakes, ponds, glaciers > 1 km^{2} (0.386 sq mi or 247 acres) and river estuaries.

Olivet (French pronunciation: [ɔlivɛ]) is a commune in the Mayenne department in north-western France.

== See also ==
- Communes of Mayenne
