= Canton of L'Huisserie =

Coordinates: 48.02°N 0.77°W

The canton of L'Huisserie is an administrative division of the Mayenne department, northwestern France. It was created at the French canton reorganisation which came into effect in March 2015. Its seat is in L'Huisserie.

It consists of the following communes:

1. Ahuillé
2. Entrammes
3. Forcé
4. L'Huisserie
5. Louvigné
6. Montigné-le-Brillant
7. Nuillé-sur-Vicoin
8. Parné-sur-Roc
9. Soulgé-sur-Ouette
