= Forcé =

- Commune
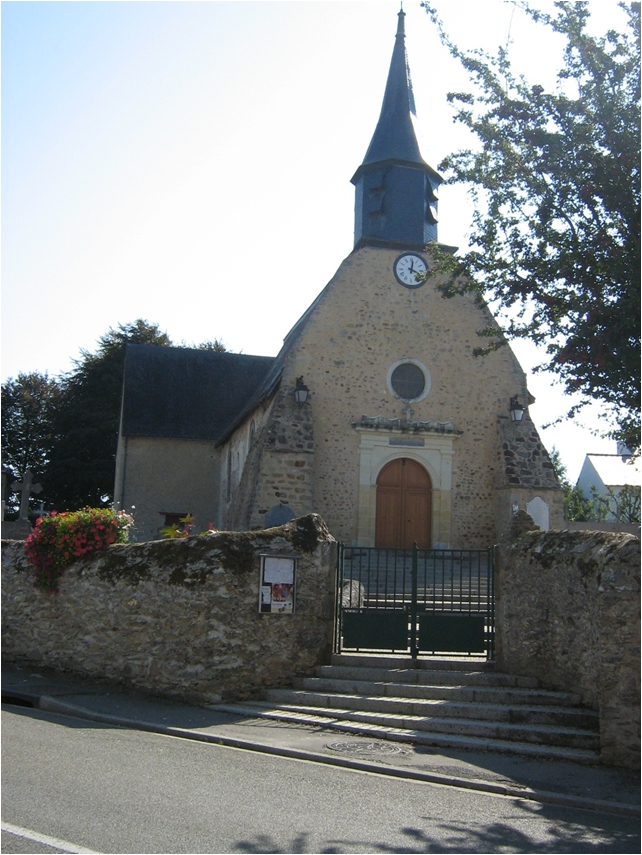
- The Church of Sainte Marie-Madeleine, in Forcé
- Location of Forcé
- Location within France Location within Pays de la Loire
- Coordinates: 48°02′03″N 0°41′55″W
- Country: France
- Region: Pays de la Loire
- Department: Mayenne
- Arrondissement: Laval
- Canton: L'Huisserie
- Intercommunality: Laval Agglomération

Government
  - Mayor (2020–2026): Annette Chesnel
- Area^{1}: 4.94 km^{2} (1.91 sq mi)
- Elevation: 70 m (230 ft)
- Highest elevation: 103 m (338 ft)
- Lowest elevation: 43 m (141 ft)
- Population (2023): 1,099
  - Density: 222/km^{2} (576/sq mi)
- Time zone: UTC+01:00 (CET)
  - Summer (DST): UTC+02:00 (CEST)
- INSEE/Postal code: 53099 /53260
- ^{1} French Land Register data, which excludes lakes, ponds, glaciers > 1 km^{2} (0.386 sq mi or 247 acres) and river estuaries.

Forcé (French pronunciation: [fɔʁse]) is a commune in the Mayenne department in north-western France.

== See also ==
- Communes of the Mayenne department
