= Changé, Mayenne =

Changé
- Commune
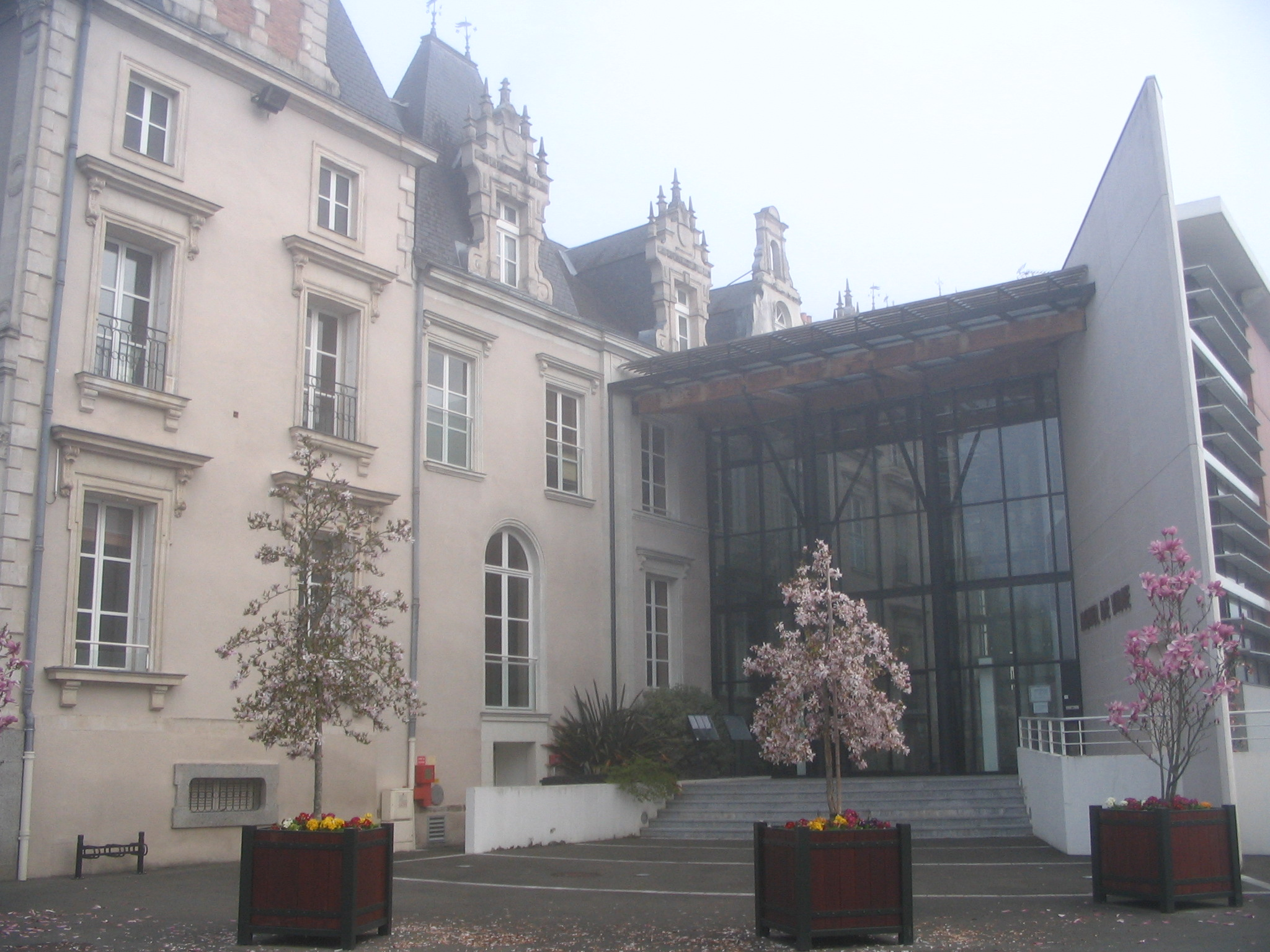
- The town hall, in Changé

- Coat of arms
- Location of Changé
- Location within France Location within Pays de la Loire
- Coordinates: 48°06′03″N 0°47′23″W
- Country: France
- Region: Pays de la Loire
- Department: Mayenne
- Arrondissement: Laval
- Canton: Saint-Berthevin
- Intercommunality: Laval Agglomération

Government
  - Mayor (2020–2026): Patrick Peniguel
- Area^{1}: 34.68 km^{2} (13.39 sq mi)
- Elevation: 71 m (233 ft)
- Highest elevation: 159 m (522 ft)
- Lowest elevation: 45 m (148 ft)
- Population (2023): 6,502
  - Density: 187.5/km^{2} (485.6/sq mi)
- Time zone: UTC+01:00 (CET)
  - Summer (DST): UTC+02:00 (CEST)
- INSEE/Postal code: 53054 /53810
- ^{1} French Land Register data, which excludes lakes, ponds, glaciers > 1 km^{2} (0.386 sq mi or 247 acres) and river estuaries.

Changé (French pronunciation: [ʃɑ̃ʒe]) is a commune in the Mayenne department in north-western France.

== Population ==
Historical population
Year	Pop.	±% p.a.
1968	1,414	—
1975	2,002	+5.09%
1982	2,889	+5.38%
1990	4,323	+5.17%
1999	4,909	+1.42%
2007	5,265	+0.88%
2012	5,573	+1.14%
2017	6,020	+1.56%
2023	6,502	+1.29%
Source: INSEE

== See also ==
- Communes of the Mayenne department
