= Louvigné =

- Commune
- Location of Louvigné
- Location within France Location within Pays de la Loire
- Coordinates: 48°03′28″N 0°37′45″W
- Country: France
- Region: Pays de la Loire
- Department: Mayenne
- Arrondissement: Laval
- Canton: L'Huisserie
- Intercommunality: Laval Agglomération

Government
  - Mayor (2020–2026): Christine Dubois
- Area^{1}: 12.56 km^{2} (4.85 sq mi)
- Elevation: 95 m (312 ft)
- Highest elevation: 103 m (338 ft)
- Lowest elevation: 52 m (171 ft)
- Population (2023): 1,193
  - Density: 94.98/km^{2} (246.0/sq mi)
- Time zone: UTC+01:00 (CET)
  - Summer (DST): UTC+02:00 (CEST)
- INSEE/Postal code: 53141 /53210
- ^{1} French Land Register data, which excludes lakes, ponds, glaciers > 1 km^{2} (0.386 sq mi or 247 acres) and river estuaries.

Louvigné (French pronunciation: [luviɲe]) is a commune in the Mayenne department in north-western France.

== See also ==
- Communes of the Mayenne department
