= Montflours =

- Commune
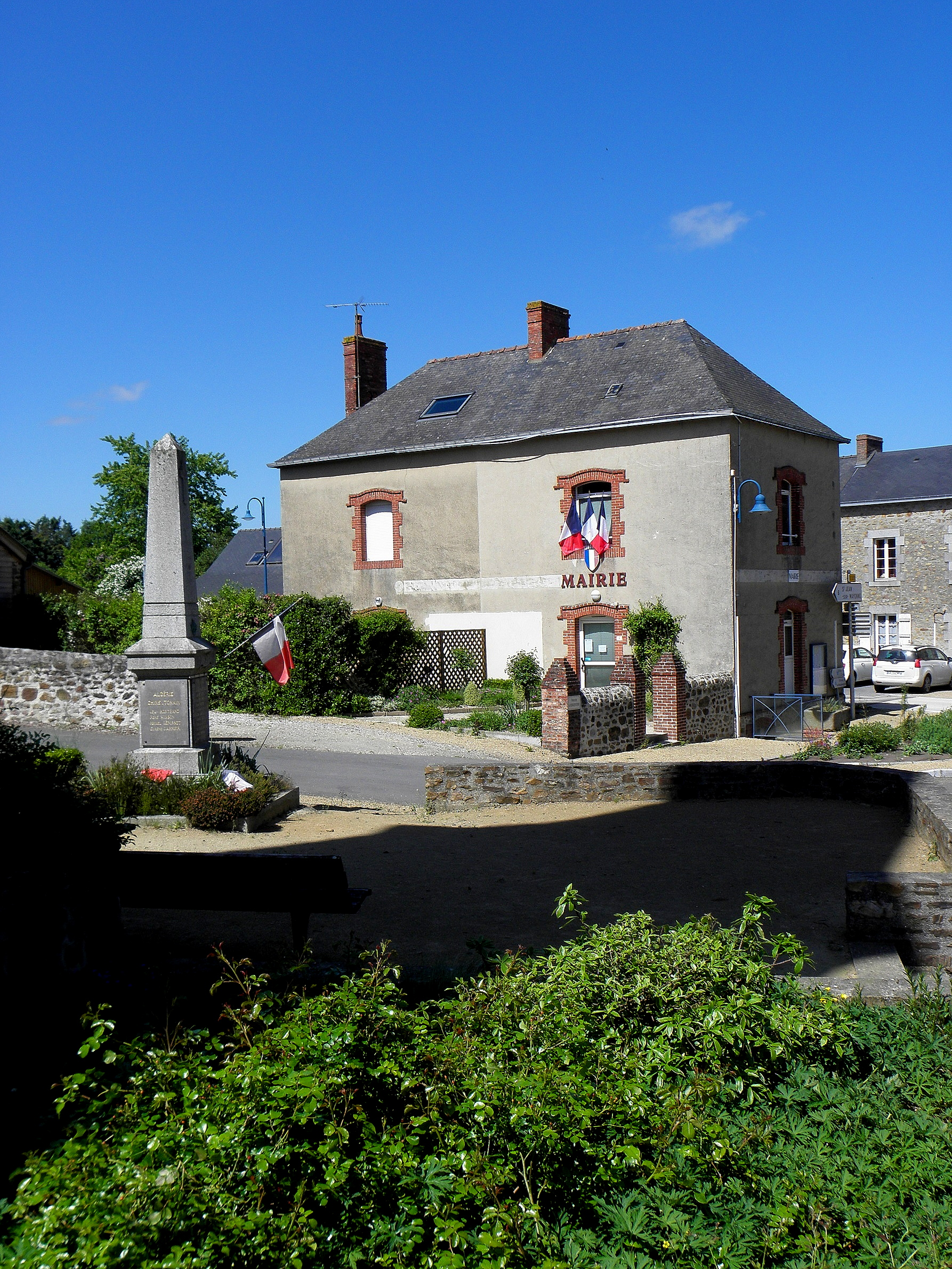
- Montflours Town Hall
- Location of Montflours
- Location within France Location within Pays de la Loire
- Coordinates: 48°10′19″N 0°43′56″W
- Country: France
- Region: Pays de la Loire
- Department: Mayenne
- Arrondissement: Laval
- Canton: Bonchamp-lès-Laval
- Intercommunality: Laval Agglomération

Government
  - Mayor (2020–2026): André Delefosse
- Area^{1}: 7.93 km^{2} (3.06 sq mi)
- Highest elevation: 138 m (453 ft)
- Lowest elevation: 52 m (171 ft)
- Population (2023): 247
  - Density: 31.1/km^{2} (80.7/sq mi)
- Time zone: UTC+01:00 (CET)
  - Summer (DST): UTC+02:00 (CEST)
- INSEE/Postal code: 53156 /53240
- ^{1} French Land Register data, which excludes lakes, ponds, glaciers > 1 km^{2} (0.386 sq mi or 247 acres) and river estuaries.

Montflours (French pronunciation: [mɔ̃fluʁ]) is a commune in the Mayenne department in north-western France.

== See also ==
- Communes of Mayenne
