= Saint-Germain-le-Fouilloux =

- Commune
- Location of Saint-Germain-le-Fouilloux
- Location within France Location within Pays de la Loire
- Coordinates: 48°08′15″N 0°47′18″W
- Country: France
- Region: Pays de la Loire
- Department: Mayenne
- Arrondissement: Laval
- Canton: Saint-Berthevin
- Intercommunality: Laval Agglomération

Government
  - Mayor (2020–2026): Marcel Blanchet
- Area^{1}: 15.48 km^{2} (5.98 sq mi)
- Elevation: 128 m (420 ft)
- Highest elevation: 146 m (479 ft)
- Lowest elevation: 55 m (180 ft)
- Population (2023): 1,172
  - Density: 75.71/km^{2} (196.1/sq mi)
- Time zone: UTC+01:00 (CET)
  - Summer (DST): UTC+02:00 (CEST)
- INSEE/Postal code: 53224 /53240
- ^{1} French Land Register data, which excludes lakes, ponds, glaciers > 1 km^{2} (0.386 sq mi or 247 acres) and river estuaries.

Saint-Germain-le-Fouilloux (French pronunciation: [sɛ̃ ʒɛʁmɛ̃ lə fuju]) is a commune in the Mayenne department in north-western France.

== See also ==
- Communes of the Mayenne department
