= Saint-Cyr-le-Gravelais =

- Commune
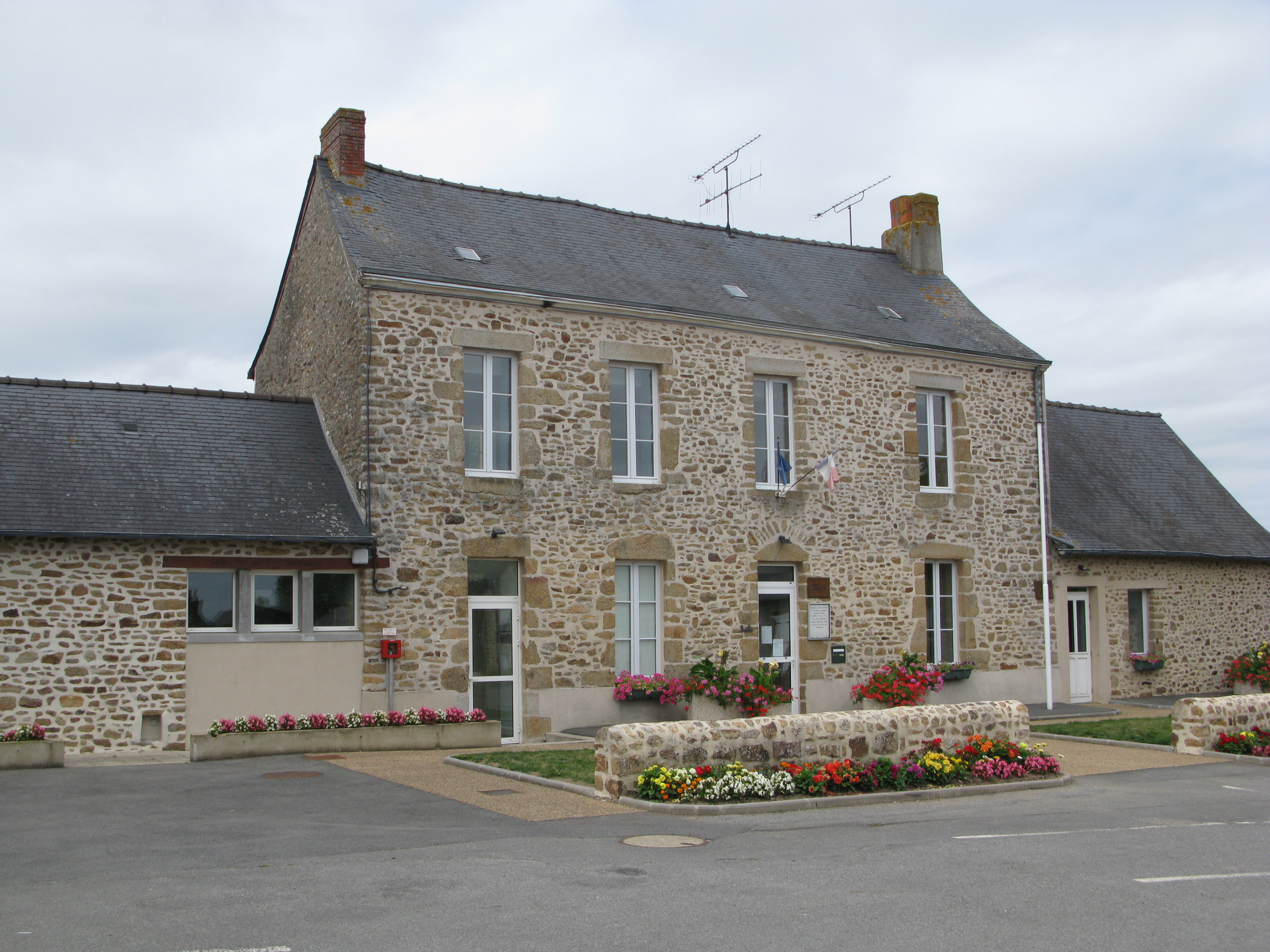
- The town hall in Saint-Cyr-le-Gravelais
- Location of Saint-Cyr-le-Gravelais
- Location within France Location within Pays de la Loire
- Coordinates: 48°02′09″N 1°01′34″W
- Country: France
- Region: Pays de la Loire
- Department: Mayenne
- Arrondissement: Laval
- Canton: Loiron-Ruillé
- Intercommunality: Laval Agglomération

Government
  - Mayor (2020–2026): Louis Michel
- Area^{1}: 19.82 km^{2} (7.65 sq mi)
- Elevation: 143 m (469 ft)
- Highest elevation: 177 m (581 ft)
- Lowest elevation: 82 m (269 ft)
- Population (2023): 567
  - Density: 28.6/km^{2} (74.1/sq mi)
- Time zone: UTC+01:00 (CET)
  - Summer (DST): UTC+02:00 (CEST)
- INSEE/Postal code: 53209 /53320
- ^{1} French Land Register data, which excludes lakes, ponds, glaciers > 1 km^{2} (0.386 sq mi or 247 acres) and river estuaries.

Saint-Cyr-le-Gravelais (French pronunciation: [sɛ̃ siʁ lə ɡʁavlɛ]) is a commune in the Mayenne department in north-western France.

== Geography ==
The river Oudon forms part of the commune's northern border.

== See also ==
- Communes of Mayenne
