= Parné-sur-Roc =

- Commune
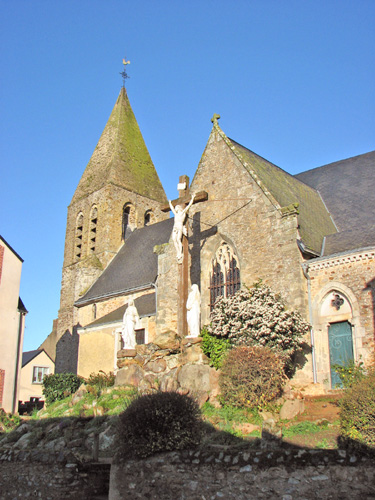
- The church of Saint Pierre, in Parné-sur-Roc
- Location of Parné-sur-Roc
- Location within France Location within Pays de la Loire
- Coordinates: 48°00′26″N 0°40′09″W
- Country: France
- Region: Pays de la Loire
- Department: Mayenne
- Arrondissement: Laval
- Canton: L'Huisserie
- Intercommunality: Laval Agglomération

Government
  - Mayor (2020–2026): David Cardoso
- Area^{1}: 23.74 km^{2} (9.17 sq mi)
- Elevation: 81 m (266 ft)
- Highest elevation: 106 m (348 ft)
- Lowest elevation: 38 m (125 ft)
- Population (2023): 1,378
  - Density: 58.05/km^{2} (150.3/sq mi)
- Time zone: UTC+01:00 (CET)
  - Summer (DST): UTC+02:00 (CEST)
- INSEE/Postal code: 53175 /53260
- ^{1} French Land Register data, which excludes lakes, ponds, glaciers > 1 km^{2} (0.386 sq mi or 247 acres) and river estuaries.

Parné-sur-Roc (French pronunciation: [paʁne syʁ ʁɔk]) is a commune in the Mayenne department in northwestern France, boarding the Jouanne river.

== See also ==
- Communes of Mayenne
