= Montjean, Mayenne =

Montjean
- Commune
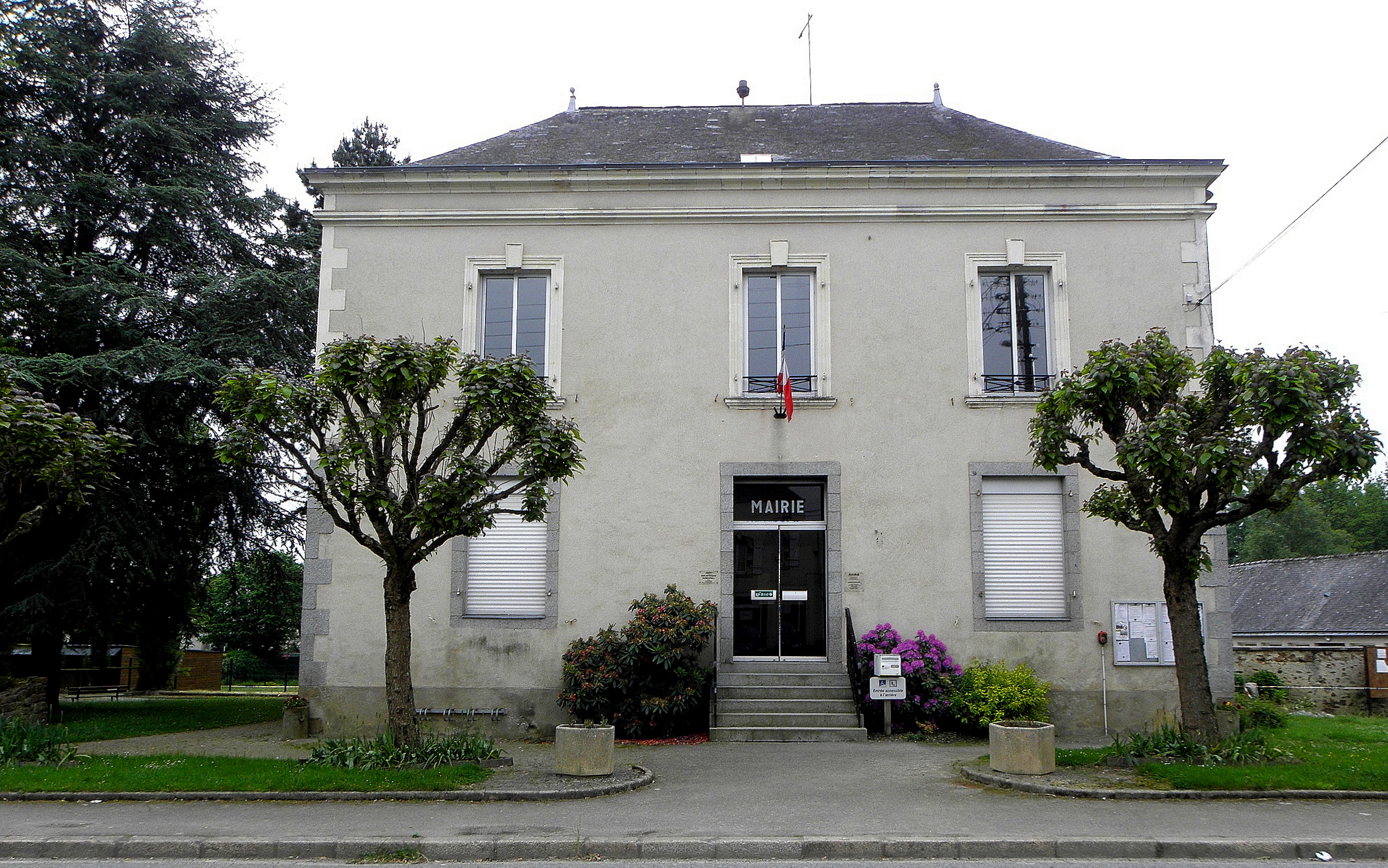
- Town hall
- Location of Montjean
- Location within France Location within Pays de la Loire
- Coordinates: 48°00′24″N 0°57′29″W
- Country: France
- Region: Pays de la Loire
- Department: Mayenne
- Arrondissement: Laval
- Canton: Loiron-Ruillé
- Intercommunality: Laval Agglomération

Government
  - Mayor (2020–2026): Vincent Paillard
- Area^{1}: 19.75 km^{2} (7.63 sq mi)
- Elevation: 50 m (160 ft)
- Highest elevation: 121 m (397 ft)
- Lowest elevation: 73 m (240 ft)
- Population (2023): 1,020
  - Density: 51.6/km^{2} (134/sq mi)
- Time zone: UTC+01:00 (CET)
  - Summer (DST): UTC+02:00 (CEST)
- INSEE/Postal code: 53158 /53320
- ^{1} French Land Register data, which excludes lakes, ponds, glaciers > 1 km^{2} (0.386 sq mi or 247 acres) and river estuaries.

Montjean (French pronunciation: [mɔ̃ʒɑ̃]) is a commune in the Mayenne department in north-western France.

== Geography ==
The river Oudon flows through the middle of the commune and crosses the village of Montjean.

== See also ==
- Communes of Mayenne
