= Argentré =

- Commune
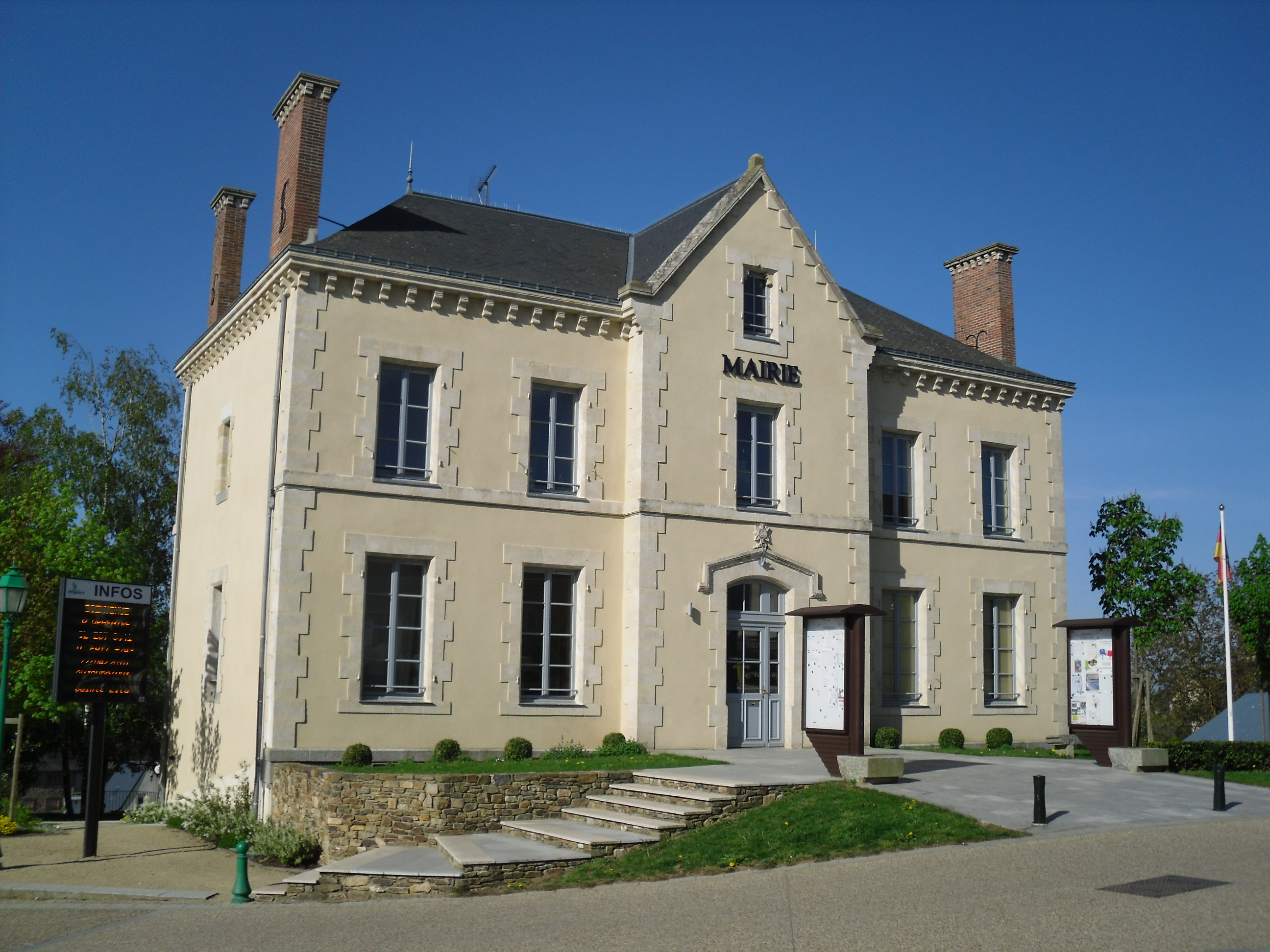
- The town hall in Argentré

- Coat of arms
- Location of Argentré
- Location within France Location within Pays de la Loire
- Coordinates: 48°05′06″N 0°38′24″W
- Country: France
- Region: Pays de la Loire
- Department: Mayenne
- Arrondissement: Laval
- Canton: Bonchamp-lès-Laval
- Intercommunality: Laval Agglomération

Government
  - Mayor (2020–2026): Christian Lefort
- Area^{1}: 36.77 km^{2} (14.20 sq mi)
- Elevation: 100 m (330 ft)
- Highest elevation: 128 m (420 ft)
- Lowest elevation: 55 m (180 ft)
- Population (2023): 2,906
  - Density: 79.03/km^{2} (204.7/sq mi)
- Time zone: UTC+01:00 (CET)
  - Summer (DST): UTC+02:00 (CEST)
- INSEE/Postal code: 53007 /53210
- ^{1} French Land Register data, which excludes lakes, ponds, glaciers > 1 km^{2} (0.386 sq mi or 247 acres) and river estuaries.

Argentré (French pronunciation: [aʁʒɑ̃tʁe]) is a commune in the Mayenne department in northwestern France.

== Population ==
Historical population
Year	Pop.	±% p.a.
1968	1,043	—
1975	1,246	+2.57%
1982	1,844	+5.76%
1990	2,160	+2.00%
1999	2,325	+0.82%
2007	2,511	+0.97%
2012	2,694	+1.42%
2017	2,814	+0.88%
2023	2,906	+0.54%
Source: INSEE

== See also ==
- Communes of Mayenne
