= Canton of Bonchamp-lès-Laval =

French administrative division

Coordinates: 48.07°N 0.70°W

The canton of Bonchamp-lès-Laval is an administrative division of the Mayenne department, northwestern France. It was created at the French canton reorganisation which came into effect in March 2015. Its seat is in Bonchamp-lès-Laval.

It consists of the following communes:

1. Argentré
2. Bonchamp-lès-Laval
3. Châlons-du-Maine
4. La Chapelle-Anthenaise
5. Gesnes
6. Louverné
7. Montflours
8. Sacé
