= Canton of Loiron-Ruillé =

Coordinates: 48.06°N 0.94°W

The canton of Loiron-Ruillé (before March 2020: canton of Loiron) is an administrative division of the Mayenne department, northwestern France. Its borders were not modified at the French canton reorganisation which came into effect in March 2015. Its seat is in Loiron-Ruillé.

It consists of the following communes:

1. Beaulieu-sur-Oudon
2. Le Bourgneuf-la-Forêt
3. Bourgon
4. La Brûlatte
5. Le Genest-Saint-Isle
6. La Gravelle
7. Launay-Villiers
8. Loiron-Ruillé
9. Montjean
10. Olivet
11. Port-Brillet
12. Saint-Cyr-le-Gravelais
13. Saint-Ouën-des-Toits
14. Saint-Pierre-la-Cour
