= Jouanne =

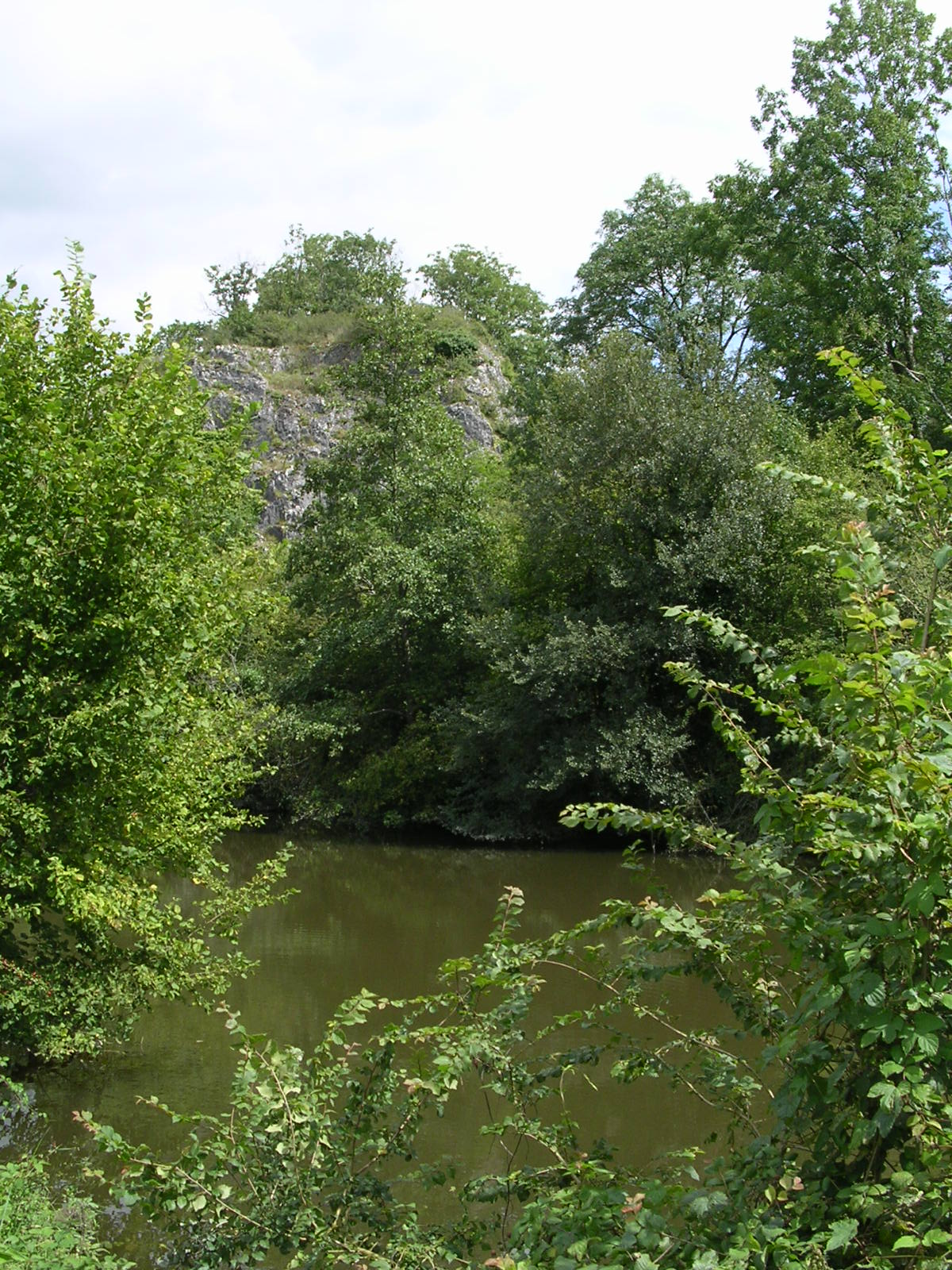
- The Jouanne near Argentré

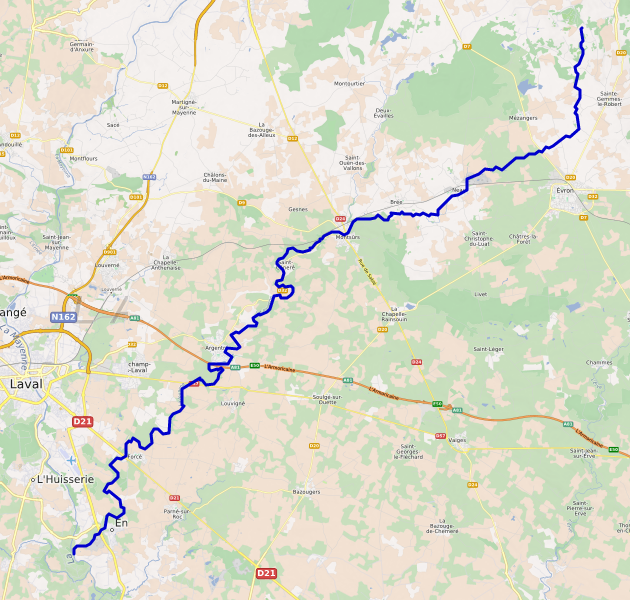
- Native name: La Jouanne (French)

Location
- Country: France

Physical characteristics
- Source
  - location: La Hardière
  - elevation: 172 m (564 ft)
- Mouth
  - location: Mayenne
  - coordinates: 48°13′49″N 0°23′28″W
- Length: 58.5 km (36.4 mi)
- Basin size: 422 km^{2} (163 sq mi)

Basin features
- Progression: Mayenne→ Maine→ Loire→ Atlantic Ocean

The Jouanne (French pronunciation: [ʒwan]) is a 58.5 km (36.4 mi) long river in western France located in the department of Mayenne, region of Pays de la Loire. It is a tributary of the river Mayenne on the left side, and so is a sub-tributary of the Loire by Mayenne and Maine.

== History ==
The name of Jouanne probably goes back to the Gaulish form div-onna (divine-water). The evolution of Divonne is exactly the same as that of divrnus which engendered day in modern French.

== Gallery ==
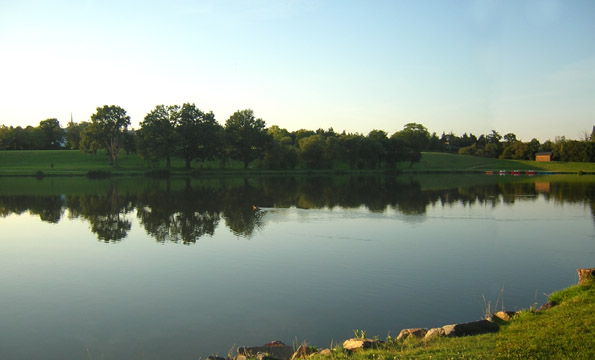
The Alleux pond in Argentré

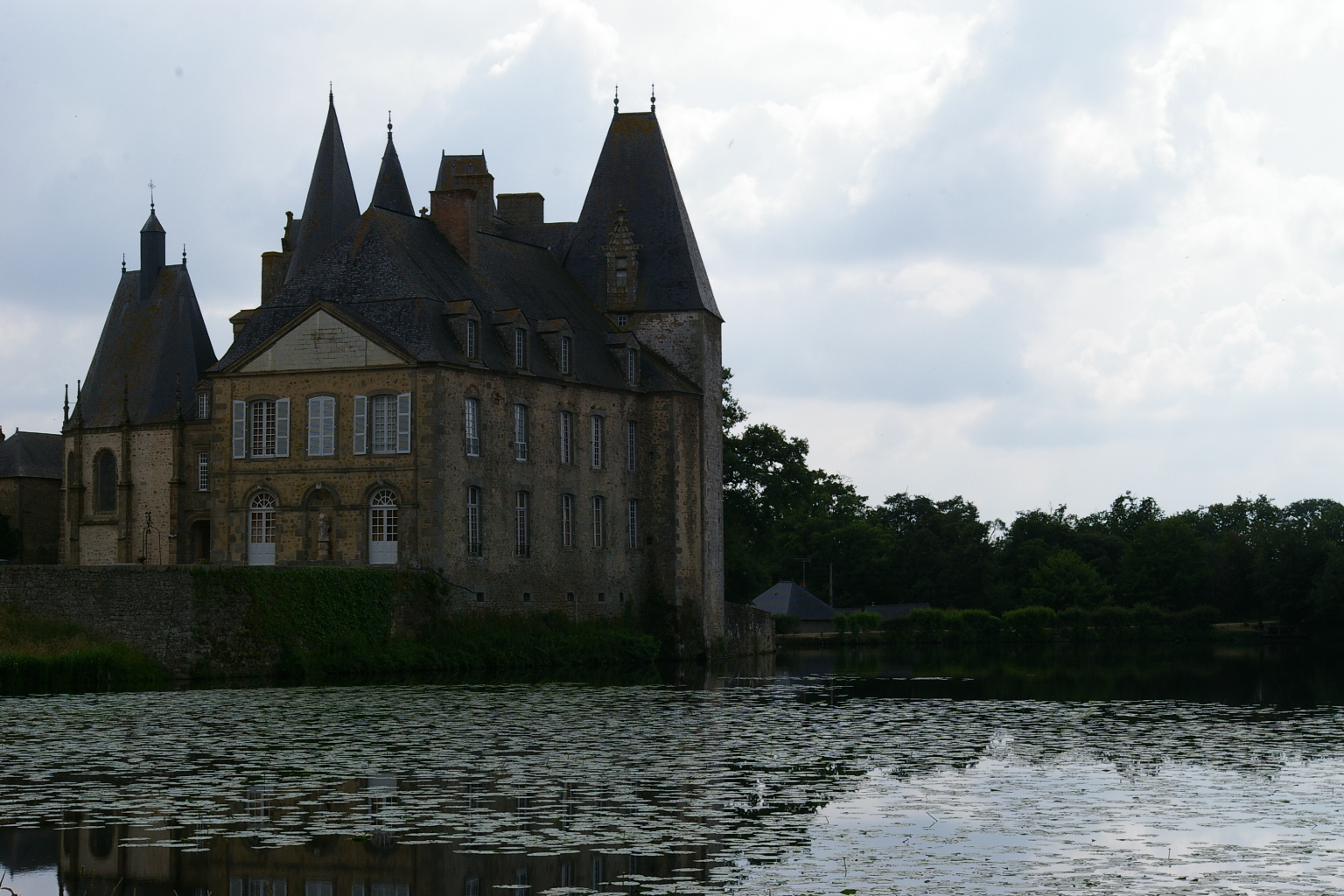
Rocher castle in Mézangers

== See also ==
- Ouette
