= Simon Richir =

French engineer and virtual reality researcher

- Born: 1964 (age 61–62); Amiens, France
- Citizenship: French
- Education: Arts et Métiers ParisTech
- Occupations: Professor, engineer, researcher
- Employer: Arts et Métiers ParisTech
- Known for: Co-founding Laval Virtual
- Website: https://simonrichir.fr/simon-richir/

Simon Richir (born 1964 in Amiens) is a French engineer and academic specializing in virtual reality (VR) and augmented reality (AR). He is a professor at Arts et Métiers, head of the "Presence & Innovation" research team at the LAMPA laboratory (Laboratoire Arts et Métiers ParisTech d'Angers, EA1427, HESAM Université), and the co-founder and scientific director of Laval Virtual, an international conference and trade fair on VR and AR technologies held annually in Laval, France, since 1999.

== Early life and education ==
Richir was born in 1964 in Amiens. He graduated as an engineer from Arts et Métiers ParisTech (Lille campus, class of 1984) in 1987. He went on to earn a doctorate from the École nationale supérieure d'arts et métiers (ENSAM) in 1994, with a thesis on new product design in the toy industry, supervised by R. Duchamp.

== Career ==
In 1995, Richir became a senior lecturer (maître de conférences) at the University of Angers, where he led the innovation department of the engineering school ISTIA (Polytech Angers).

At the invitation of François d'Aubert, former French minister of research and mayor of Laval, Richir moved to Laval and, together with Bernard Taravel (a professor at the University of Angers and co-creator of the Futuroscope) and Guy Le Bras (director-general of the GART transport association), conceived the founding concept of [Laval Virtual, first held in June 1999. The event grew from a national gathering into an internationally recognized conference on immersive technologies, and Richir has served as its scientific director since its creation.

In 2005, he became a full professor (professeur des universités) within Arts et Métiers and founded and directed the Arts et Métiers Institute of Laval, along with the "Presence & Innovation" research laboratory. In 2006, he created a research master's degree in the management of interactive 3D technologies.

He is also editor-in-chief of the International Journal of Virtual Reality (IJVR) and has written a regular column on virtual reality for the French engineering reference publisher Techniques de l'Ingénieur.

== Research ==
Richir's research and teaching focus on the practical uses of immersive technologies, technological innovation, product/process/service design methodologies, ideation, and management. He heads the "Presence & Innovation" research team at LAMPA and holds an industrial research chair, "Time to Concept – iPerform". According to the French national doctoral-thesis database theses.fr, he has supervised 36 doctoral theses as director, and has also served as a thesis rapporteur (11 times), jury president (14 times), and examiner (27 times). He is credited as co-author of more than 200 academic publications.

== Selected recognition ==
Richir was included in L'Usine Nouvelle's "100 du Numérique" list in April 2012 and in Arts & Métiers Magazine's "100 Gadz'Arts qui font l'industrie" list in April 2016. He has been invited as a keynote speaker at international conferences on virtual and augmented reality, including IEEE VR 2024, where he presented on the history of Laval Virtual and its role in establishing Laval as an international hub for VR/AR research and development.

== Personal life ==
Outside of his academic career, Richir has performed as an improvisational actor with La Tila, a Laval-based improvisational theatre troupe, and founded La Compagnie des Imposteurs, which stages humorous events for companies and organizations. During the COVID-19 lockdowns in France, he produced improvised videos distributed online, a project covered by the regional public broadcaster France 3 Pays de la Loire. In 2020, local press reported on his support for a project to establish an alternative school near Laval, based on the Sudbury school model.
