= Cantons of the Mayenne department =

The following is a list of the 17 cantons of the Mayenne department, in France, following the French canton reorganisation which came into effect in March 2015:

- Bonchamp-lès-Laval
- Château-Gontier-sur-Mayenne-1
- Château-Gontier-sur-Mayenne-2
- Cossé-le-Vivien
- Ernée
- Évron
- Gorron
- L'Huisserie
- Lassay-les-Châteaux
- Laval-1
- Laval-2
- Laval-3
- Loiron-Ruillé
- Mayenne
- Meslay-du-Maine
- Saint-Berthevin
- Villaines-la-Juhel
