= Mayenne's 1st constituency =

Constituency of the National Assembly of France

1st constituency of Mayenne
- inline Constituency of the National Assembly of France

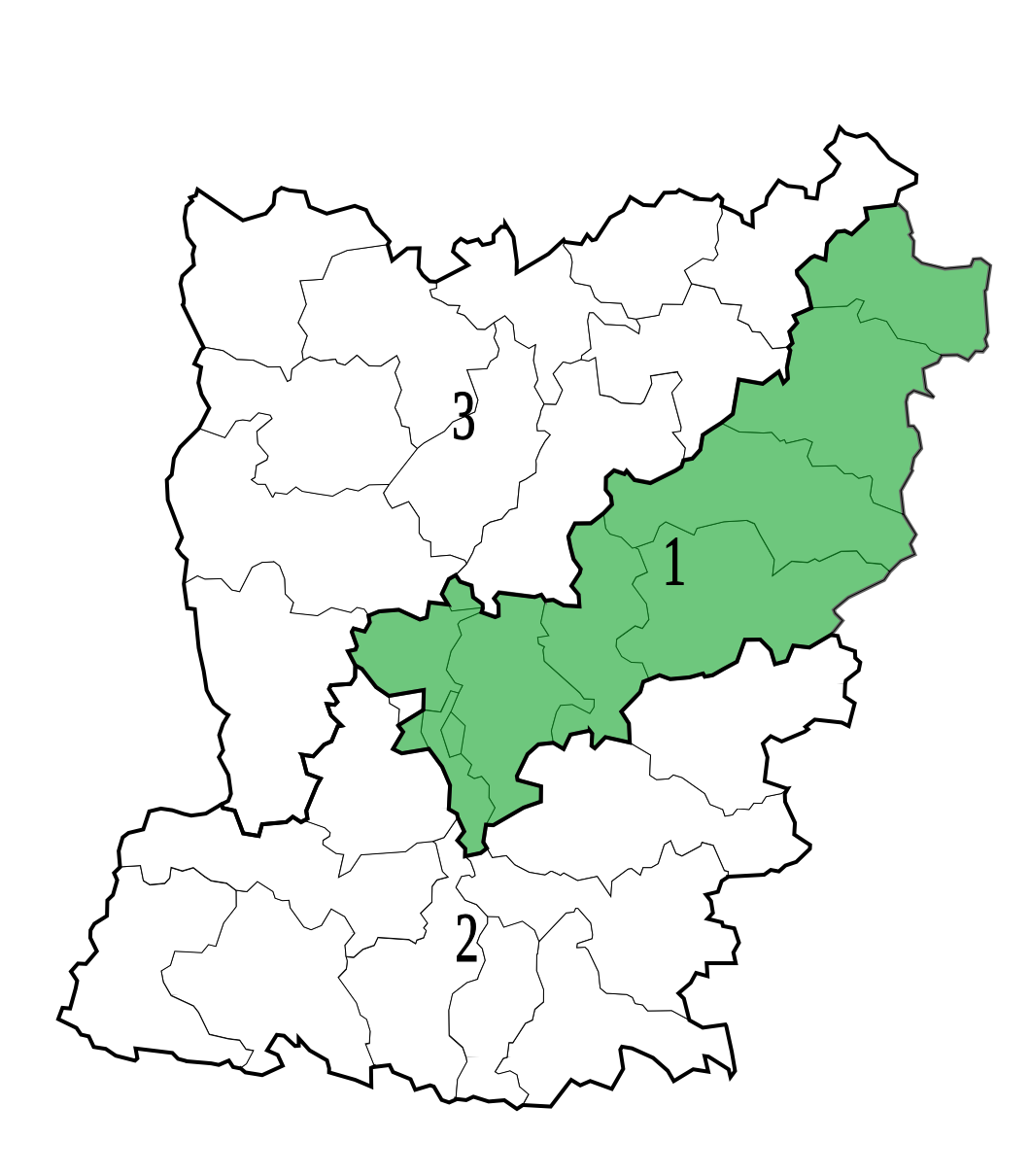
- Map of constituency (as defined in 2010) in department

- Location of Mayenne in France
- Deputy: Guillaume Garot; PS
- Department: Mayenne
- Cantons: (pre-2015) Argentré, Bais, Evron, Laval Est, Laval Nord-Ouest, Laval-Saint-Nicolas, Laval Sud-Ouest, Montsûrs, Pré-en-Pail, Saint-Berthevin, Villaines-la-Juhel

The 1st constituency of Mayenne is a French legislative constituency in the Mayenne département.

== Historic representation ==
Election	Member	Party
1988	François d'Aubert	UDF
1993	François d'Aubert	UDF
1995	Henri Houdouin	RPR
1997	François d'Aubert	UDF
2002	François d'Aubert	UMP
2004	Henri Houdouin	UMP
2007	Guillaume Garot	PS
2012	Guillaume Garot	PS
2012	Sylvie Pichot (Note: Substitute for Guillaume Garot and replaced him when he was Junior Minister for the Food Industry)	PS
2014	Guillaume Garot	PS
2017	Guillaume Garot	PS
2022	Guillaume Garot	PS

== Election results ==
=== 2024 ===
Candidate	Party	Alliance	First round		Second round	
Candidate	Party	Alliance	Votes	%	Votes	%
Guillaume Garot	PS	NPF	22,483	45.39	31,428	67.56
Paule Veyre de Soras	RN		14,161	28.59	32.44	32.44
Vincent Saulnier	UDI	Ensemble	9,957	20.10		
Stéphanie Hibon Arthui	LR	DVD	2,467	4.98		
Fabrice Romier	LO		465	0.94		
Valid votes			49,533	97.54	46,517	92.72
Blank votes			859	1.69	2,788	5.56
Null votes			391	0.77	864	1.72
Turnout			50,783	68.47	50,169	67.62
Abstentions			23,384	31.53	24,019	32.38
Registered voters			74,167		74,188	
Result			PS HOLD			

=== 2022 ===
Legislative Election 2022: Mayenne's 1st constituency
Party	Candidate	Votes	%	±%
PS (NUPÉS)	Guillaume Garot	17,684	49.62	+7.78
LREM (Ensemble)	Béatrice Mottier	8,415	23.61	-2.93
RN	Sandra Rocton	4,744	13.31	+5.21
LR (UDC)	Alexandre Maillard	2,317	6.50	−12.03
REC	Hugues Schlienger	1,430	4.01	N/A
Others	N/A	1,051	2.95	
Turnout		35,641	49.48	−4.29
2nd round result
PS (NUPÉS)	Guillaume Garot	20,178	63.22	+1.98
LREM (Ensemble)	Béatrice Mottier	11,739	36.78	−1.98
Turnout		31,917	46.12	−0.32
PS hold				

=== 2017 ===
Candidate	Label	First round		Second round	
Candidate	Label	Votes	%	Votes	%
Guillaume Garot	PS	11,860	30.99	18,848	61.24
Béatrice Mottier	REM	10,158	26.54	11,931	38.76
Samia Soultani-Vigneron	LR	7,092	18.53		
Bruno de La Morinière	FN	3,100	8.10		
Nicolas Chomel	FI	2,685	7.02		
Philippe Habault	DVD	1,139	2.98		
Maël Rannou	ECO	1,109	2.90		
Isabelle Mahé-Genero	DLF	476	1.24		
Aurélien Guillot	PCF	355	0.93		
Martine Amelin	EXG	159	0.42		
Luccio Stiz	DIV	136	0.36		
Votes		38,269	100.00	30,779	100.00
Valid votes		38,269	97.86	30,779	91.14
Blank votes		557	1.42	2,039	6.04
Null votes		279	0.71	952	2.82
Turnout		39,105	53.77	33,770	46.44
Abstentions		33,616	46.23	38,951	53.56
Registered voters		72,721		72,721	
Source: Ministry of the Interior

=== 2012 ===
Legislative Election 2012: Mayenne's 1st constituency
Party	Candidate	Votes	%	±%
PS	Guillaume Garot	20,109	47.15	
UMP	Samia Soultani-Vigneron	9,402	22.05	
DVD	Yves Cortes	3,660	8.58	
FN	Marie-Alix Le Comte	3,641	8.54	
AC	Isabelle Dutertre	2,601	6.10	
FG	Aurélien Guillot	1,338	3.14	
Others	N/A	1,898		
Turnout		42,649	58.69	
2nd round result
PS	Guillaume Garot	23,552	58.47	
UMP	Samia Soultani-Vigneron	16,729	41.53	
Turnout		40,281	55.44	
PS hold				

=== 2007 ===
Legislative Election 2007: Mayenne 1st - 2nd round
Party	Candidate	Votes	%	±%
PS	Guillaume Garot	25,258	50.63	
UMP	François d'Aubert	24,634	49.37	
Turnout		50,992	62.41	
PS hold		Swing		

== Sources ==
- Official results of French elections from 1998: "Résultats électoraux officiels en France" (in French). Archived from the original on 20 December 2011.
