= Géo Ham =

French painter and illustrator

- Born: Georges Hamel; September 18, 1900; Laval, Mayenne
- Died: June 1972 (aged 71); Paris
- Honours: Official Painter of the French Air and Space Force

Géo Ham, Georges Hamel (18 September 1900 in Laval, Mayenne, France – June 1972 in Paris) was a French painter and illustrator.

He is known for his illustrations of aeroplanes or automobiles which appeared in L'Illustration. He also illustrated numerous posters advertising major motor races in France including the Le Mans 24 hour race and the Monaco Grand Prix.

In 1918, he was received at the École nationale supérieure des arts décoratifs.

He was appointed as an Official Peintre de l'Air in 1931.

Géo Ham competed in the 1934 Le Mans 24 hour race in a 2 litre Derby. He did not finish the race as transmission problems forced him to withdraw.

== Works ==
- Jacques Mortane, ill. Géo Ham: Large aircraft raids, Ed. Mame, 1936
- Roland Tessier, Illustrations by Géo Ham: Henri Guillaumet, Éditions Flammarion, 1947
