= Louis Lemercier de Neuville =

French puppeteer, journalist, columnist, playwright and storyteller

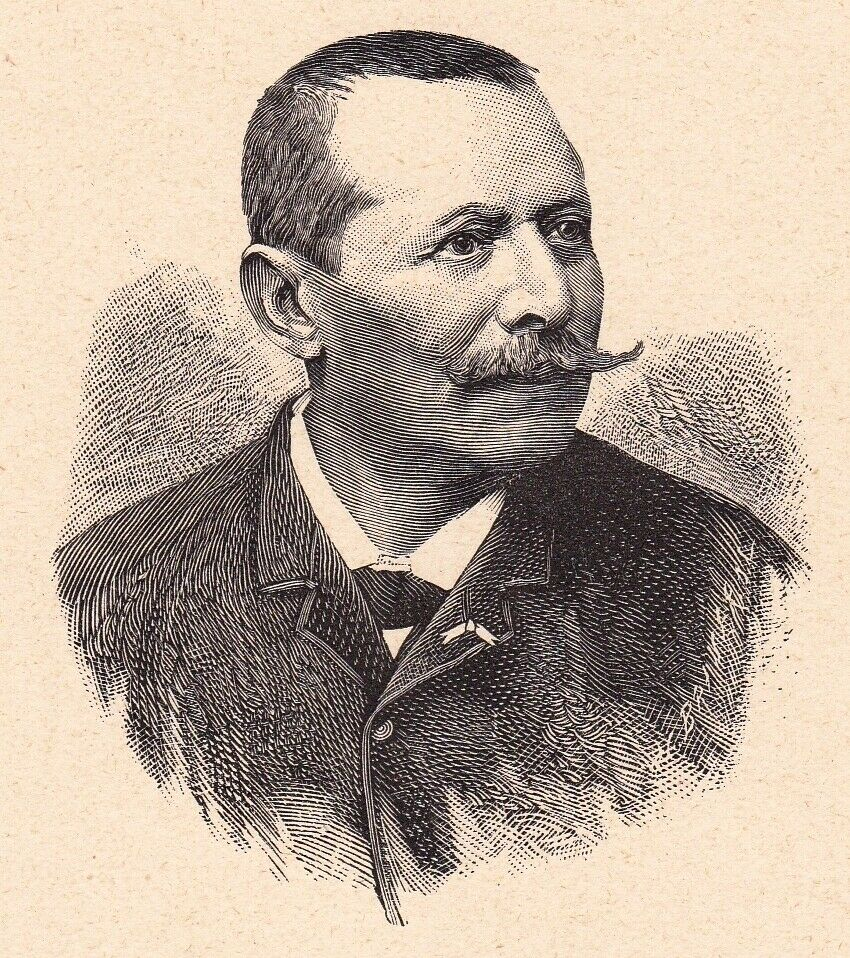
- Engraved portrait after a photograph (before 1894)
- Born: Louis Lemercier; 2 July 1830; Laval, Mayenne
- Died: 1918 (aged 87–88); Nice
- Occupations: Journalist; Puppeteer; Playwright
- Spouse(s): Ghislaine Antoinette Kuppens (5 July 1858); Céline Donnancé (11 July 1917).

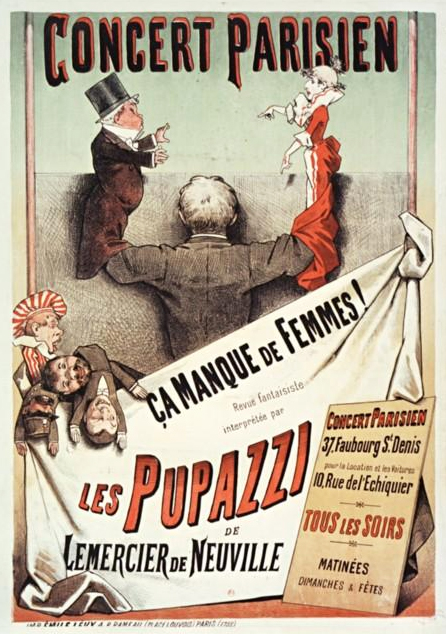
Ça manque de femmes !, revue fantaisiste performed by Lemercier de Neuville's Pupazzi at Concert parisien (1884)

Louis Lemercier de Neuville or La Haudussière, real name Louis Lemercier, (2 July 1830 – 1918) was a French puppeteer, journalist, columnist, playwright and storyteller. He created the French Théâtre de Pupazzi.

== Biography ==
Louis was the son of Louis Lemercier from Laval and Louise Deneuville, born in Rennes. He studied at the Lycée de Laval from 1842 to 1846. He began with a brief career in the Post Office. He then founded several ephemeral periodicals: on 4 March 1855, he launched his first newspaper entitled La Muselière, journal de la décadence intellectuelle. He later wrote for L'Indépendance dramatique. fairly regularly and published, in 1855 and 1856, the Pastiches critiques des auteurs contemporains, the Inconnus célèbres, and the novel Miettes de pain perdues. At the end of 1856, he became chief editor of L'Exemple. In 1857, he published several letters from Paris in the theatrical press and had a "comédie en vaudeville" played at the Théâtre de l'Ambigu-Comique entitled Recette pour marier ses filles.

In 1858, he founded Le Parisien, an illustrated journal. Only six issues were printed for lack of money. He also edited the 17 and 18 April 1858 issues of Le Foyer.

He married Ghislaine Antoinette Kuppens, 5 July 1858, who was born in Tournai, 12 November 1835. In December 1858, in collaboration with Victor Cochinat, he published Le Guide des Fumeurs. In January 1859, he founded La Causerie. He replaced Jules Moinaux as chief editor of the Zouave. In December, he established the Nouvelles de Paris. He later collaborated with several newspapers including Le Figaro, Le Nain jaune, and Le Monde illustré. He also published various types of books, including comédies en vaudeville, small novels etc.

In 1860, he opened a mobile pupazzi theatre staging celebrities of the time as caricatures. It was a great success in the salons of the late nineteenth century. He later married Céline Donnancé in Nice, 11 July 1917.

As daughter from his first marriage was Lucienne de Saint-Mart (born 6 October 1866 in Laval - died 28 March 1953 in Laguna Beach), a painter, wife of Georges-Maximilien de Saint-Mart. She lived in the United States and from 1910 to 1918, in Russia, at Nicholas II of Russia's court (she painted a portrait of the tsar). She left Russia at the outbreak of the Russian Revolution of 1917.

== Publications ==
- 1854: Revue rouennaise, 1er numéro, pièce en 1 acte, précédée d'un prologue…, Rouen, impr. de H. Renaux, Gr. in-8, 15 p. available at Gallica
- 1856: Pastiches critiques des poètes contemporains, E. Dentu in-18, 36 p. available at Gallica
- 1857: Recette pour marier ses filles, vaudeville en 1 acte… Théâtre de l'Ambigu-Comique, 18 December.], impr. de Morris, (s. d.) Gr. in-8, 8 p. available at Gallica
- 1858: Les Sabots de Noël, comédie en 2 actes, avec couplets, Larousse et Boyer, in-18, 40 p. available at Gallica
- 1858: Angéline, ou Voyages aux royaumes de la parure, de la gourmandise et du travail, moralité-féerie en 3 actes, Larousse et Boyer, (1893, 1912), in-18, 71 p. available at Gallica
- 1859: Le Guide des fumeurs, la pipe, le cigare et la cigarette; by Lemercier de Neuville and Victor Cochinat, Taride, in-18;
- 1859: Hygiène des fumeurs, la pipe, le cigare et la cigarette; par Lemercier de Neuville et Victor Cochinat, Taride, in-16;
- 1860: Contes et comédies de la jeunesse…, C. Delagrave, in-4, 205 p., fig. available at Gallica
- 1860: Les Hidalgos de Paris, one-act operetta; lyrics by M. Lemercier de Neuville, music by M. A. de Villebichot…, Legouix, in-4, 4 p.;
- 1861: Les Femmes de Murger, by Léon Beauvallet and Lemercier de Neuville…, Charlieu et Huillery, Gr. in-8, 118 p. and pl. available at Gallica
- 1861: Les Figures du temps, notices biographiques, photographs by Pierre Petit…, A. Bourdilliat, 3 vol. in-18;
- 1861: Les Figures du temps. Notices biographiques… Robert-Houdin, A. Bourdilliat, in-16, 35 p., portrait;
- 1862: La Mort de César, one-act comedy, mingled with couplets, pour pensionnats de demoiselles, Larousse et Boyer, Gr. in-8, 15 p. available at Gallica
- 1862: Physiologie du coiffeur, Poulet-Malassis, in-18, 179 p. available at Gallica
- 1863: Galerie polonaise, notices biographiques, photographies par Pierre Petit…, E. Dentu, 2 vol. in-18;
- 1863: Les Amours d'une portière, Cournol, in-16, 64 p., Bibliothèque jaune;
- 1862: Les Tourniquets, review of the year 1861, in 3 acts and 12 scenes, with prologue and epilogue, revised, corrected and augmented of several scenes and 4 new tableaux, premiered in Paris at the Théâtre du Figaro, 15 December, illustrations by M. Emile Benassit, engraving by MM. Roch et Jacob, Poulet-Malassis, in-18, 107 p.;
- 1863: Mémoires de Crockett, suivis de la recette pour dompter les lions…, all booksellers, in-16, 32 p., fig.;
- 1866: Le Mendiant divin, légende, récitée 22 July 1866…, (S. l., ) : impr. de A. Wallon, (s. d.), in-8, 3 pages;
- 1863: Les Coulisses de l'amour, les principaux libraires, in-16, 63 p., Bibliothèque des amoureux; L. Frinzine, 1885. 3rd ed. in-18, XI-326 p., fig.;
- 1863: Annuaire du Moniteur de la coiffure, littéraire, anecdotique et illustré… par Loisel… et Robert… [Partie littéraire, par Lemercier de Neuville.], H. Picart, in-16, 341 p.;
- 1864–1866: Le théâtre érotique de la rue de la Santé : son histoire, Batignolles [Brussels] : Poulet-Malassis, 219 p. : ill. 2 parts in 1 volume;
- 1864: Les Courtisanes célèbres, Arnauld de Vresse, in-16, 266 pages;
- 1866: I Pupazzi, E. Dentu, 281 p. : ill.; in-12 available at Gallica
- 1868: Paris pantin : deuxième série des Pupazzi; illustrated with thirty drawings, Librairie internationale: A. Lacroix, Verboeckhoven, 320 p. : ill.; in-16 available at Gallica
- 1868: Théâtre des Pupazzi. Fleur de guitare, scènes de la vie amoureuse et tourmentée, in 1 act, in verse with songs, with guitar accompaniment, Strasbourg, Durry, in-8, 20 p. available at Gallica
- 1868: Théâtre des Pupazzi. Mon village, intermède pastoral in 1 act and in verse… [Marseille, Cercle de la Société des courses, 14 February.], Marseille : tous les libraires, in-16, 15 p. available at Gallica
- 1869: Sur la terrasse de Monte-Carlo, symphonie-fantaisiste en bleu majeur et en vers mineurs, [Monaco, Théâtre des Pupazzi, 8 February.], Bordeaux, impr. de A. Bord, 1in-16, 15 p.; available at Gallica
- 1872: Théâtre des Pupazzi. Le Mandat impératif, one-act play in verse… [Paris, salons du Grand-Hôtel, 9 February.], Bordeaux, all booksellers, in-16, 15 p.;
- 1874: Le Passé, fantaisie en 1 acte et en vers, Lyon, N. Scheuring, in-8, 24 p. available at Gallica
- 1876: Théâtre des Pupazzi. La Femme du monde et l'Auvergnat, comedy in 1 act and in prose. [Bordeaux, foyer de la salle Franklin, 20 January.], in-16, 16 p. available at Gallica
- 1876: Théâtre des pupazzi, Lyon, N. Scheuring, XXVI-411 p.-[1] f. de front.; in-8 available at Gallica
- 1878: La buche, fantaisie en un acte et en prose…, Montluçon : imp. Prot, in-16;
- 1880: Comédies de château, Tresse, in-18, III-273 p.;
- 1881: Les Pupazzi de l'enfance, C. Delagrave, 77 p. available at Gallica
- 1880: La Fille Elisa. Scène d'atelier en un acte. In this play, Elisa and Nana hold a dialogue whose text is borrowed from novels by Émile Zola, In Rome, au Temple de Venus; plaquette in-8;
- 1882: Contes abracadabrants, E. Hilaire, in-12, X-340 p., planche, couv. ill.; L. Boulanger, [1895], 170 p.;
- 1882: La Foire du XIXe siècle, review of the year 1882, in 3 acts, [Paris, Concert du XIXe siècle, 6 December.], in-8, 100 p., illustrated cover.; available at Gallica
- 1883: Les jeux de l'Amour et du Bazar. Comedie de Mœurs en un acte. Partout et nulle part, mais dans l'arrière boutique de toutes les librairies. En l'an de oie [sic] [i.e. Bruxelles, Kistemaekers ou Brancart], in-8°. 30 p.;
- 1882: Nouveau théâtre des pupazzi, texte et dessins naïfs, E. Hilaire, in-16, IX-307 p., pl.;
- 1885: Les Trente-six métiers de Becdanlo, L. Frinzine, in-8 obl., 39 ff., fig.;
- 1886: Arrivé par les femmes, E. Dentu, in-18, 327 p.;
- 1887: Les Avocats, one-act comedy, Librairie théâtrale, in-18, 36 p.;
- 1887: Le Général Pruneau (de Tours), comédie en 1 acte, avec la mise en scène, Librairie théâtrale, in-18, 24 p., Librairie théâtrale, 1895, in-18, 24 p. available at Gallica
- 1887: Le Pâté, comédie en 1 acte, en vers, avec la mise en scène, Librairie théâtrale, in-12, 23 p.; available at Gallica
- 1887: Tout-Paris, review of the year 1886, [Théâtre Robert-Houdin, 19 November.], Librairie théâtrale, in-16, 32 p.; available at Gallica
- 1888: Le Petit ramoneur, récit en vers, pour enfants, Librairie théâtrale, in-16, 7 p.;
- 1888: Six comédies pour jeunes filles : pièces à jouer dans les familles et dans les pensionnats, Librairie théâtrale, 1 vol. (VII-281 p.); in-16 available at Gallica
- 1889: Les Amis de province, comédie pour la jeunesse, Librairie théâtrale, in-18, 36 p. available at Gallica
- 1889: L'Atelier de peinture, comédie bouffe en 1 acte, pour la jeunesse, Librairie théâtrale, in-18, 35 p. available at Gallica
- 1889: Les Bavardes, dialogue pour l'enfance, Librairie théâtrale, in-16, 16 p.;
- 1889: Le Billet de loterie, comédie en 1 acte, pour jeunes filles, Librairie théâtrale, in-16, 30 p.;
- 1889: Le Bœuf et la grenouille, monologue pour enfants, Librairie théâtrale, in-12, 6 p.;
- 1889: Bonsoir, maman ! monologue pour enfants, Librairie théâtrale, in-16, 7 p.;
- 1889: Le Chagrin de bébé, monologue pour enfants, Librairie théâtrale, 1894, in-16, 7 p.;
- 1889: La Cigale et la fourmi, comédie en 1 acte, pour jeunes filles, Librairie théâtrale, in-18, 34 p. available at Gallica
- 1889: Le Crime de Moutiers, comédie-bouffe en 1 acte, pour jeunes gens, Librairie théâtrale, in-16, 23 p. available at Gallica
- 1889: L'École buissonnière, dialogue pour l'enfance, Librairie théâtrale, in-16, 13 p.;
- 1889: Les enfants au salon : monologues, dialogues et récits pour enfants de 8 à 12 ans, Librairie théâtrale, 1 vol. (250 p.); in-18 available at Gallica
- 1889: La Malade imaginaire, comédie en 1 acte, pour jeunes filles, Librairie théâtrale, in-18, 42 p.;
- 1889: La Maladroite, monologue pour enfants, Librairie théâtrale, in-12, 6 p.;
- 1889: No ! dialogue pour l'enfance, Librairie théâtrale, in-16, 12 p. available at Gallica
- 1889: Oh ! maman ! monologue pour enfants, Librairie théâtrale, in-16, 7 p.; Librairie théâtrale, 1896, in-16, 7 p.;
- 1889: La Petite princesse, dialogue pour l'enfance, Librairie théâtrale, in-12, 12 p.;
- 1889: Les Cuisinières, tableau culinaire en 1 acte, Librairie théâtrale, in-16, 29 p.; Librairie théâtrale, 1896, in-16, 34 p.; disponible sur Gallica
- 1889: Les Deux Gascons, dialogue pour l'enfance, Librairie théâtrale, in-12, 12 p.;
- 1889: Deux mères, comédie pour jeunes filles, Librairie théâtrale, in-18, 36 p.;
- 1889: Five o'clock tea, dialogue pour l'enfance, Librairie théâtrale in-16, 14 p.;
- 1889: Le Premier bal, comédie en 1 acte, pour jeunes filles, Librairie théâtrale, in-16, 31 p.;
- 1889: Prière naïve, monologue pour enfants, Librairie théâtrale, in-16, 8 p.;
- 1889: Rêves d'avenir, dialogue pour l'enfance, Librairie théâtrale, in-16, 11 p.;
- 1889: Une tempête dans un berceau, monologue pour enfants, Librairie théâtrale, in-16, 7 p.;
- 1890: Le Diable, comédie en 1 acte, pour jeunes gens, Librairie théâtrale, in-16, 28 p.;Librairie théâtrale, (1901.) 3e éd. available at Gallica
- 1890: Les Petits souliers, comédie en 1 acte, Librairie théâtrale, in-16, 31 p.;
- 1890: Poucet et Poucette, comédie en 1 acte, Librairie théâtrale, in-18, 27 p.;
- 1890: Le Sac de Scapin, comédie en 1 acte, pour la jeunesse, Librairie théâtrale, in-16, 26 p. available at Gallica
- 1890: Treize à table, comédie en 1 acte, Librairie théâtrale, in-16, 30 p.;
- 1890: Trois mois après, monologue… , Librairie théâtrale, in-16, 7 p.;
- 1891: Les Brevets de Margot, comédie pour jeunes filles, Librairie théâtrale, in-16, 25 p.;
- 1891: Le Désespoir de Louison, comédie en 1 acte, Librairie théâtrale, in-16, 31 p.;
- 1891: Les Doctoresses, comédie en 1 acte, Librairie théâtrale, in-16, 28 p.;
- 1891: Médard Robinot, casquettier, roman expressif, écrit et imagé, E. Dentu, in-16, 275 p., fig.;
- 1891: Une perle, saynète pour jeunes filles, Librairie théâtrale, in-12, 24 p. available at Gallica
- 1891: Le Trésor imaginaire, comédie en 1 acte, Librairie théâtrale, 1891, in-16, 31 p.;
- 1891: Le Vol-au-Vent, comédie en 1 acte, Librairie théâtrale, 1891, in-16, 31 p.;
- 1892: Histoire anecdotique des marionnettes modernes, with a foreword by Jules Claretie…, Calmann Lévy, 1892, X-306 p. : pl.; in-18 available at Gallica
- 1893: Plus vite que le train, comédie en 1 acte, pour la jeunesse, Librairie théâtrale, in-16, 24 p. available at Gallica
- 1894: Pervenche, comédie en 1 acte, pour la jeunesse, Librairie théâtrale, in-16, 28 p. available at Gallica
- 1894: Rêve d'enfant, monologue pour enfants, Librairie théâtrale, 1894, in-12, 6 p.;
- 1894: Le Souhait, monologue pour enfants, Librairie théâtrale, 1894, in-12, 6 p.;
- 1894: Le trait d'union, avec les dessins de l'auteur, L. Boulanger, 111 p.; in-16, Petite Bibliothèque Diamant; 91;
- 1896: Les Deux ormes, récit en vers, O. Bornemann, in-16, 7 p.;
- 1896: Monologues en vers de L. Lemercier de Neuville. Récits, légendes, dialogues, saynètes, monologues pour la jeunesse, O. Bornemann, in-18, VII-160 p. available at Gallica
- 1896: Oh ! monsieur ! oh ! mademoiselle ! dialogue pour un jeune homme et une jeune fille, O. Bornemann, in-16, 12 p.;
- 1896? Le procès rigolo saynète en vers, O. Bornemann, 16 p.; in-18;
- 1896: Les Pupazzi noirs, ombres animées : notice historique sur les ombres, construction du théâtre et des ombres, machination des personnages, intermèdes et pièces…, C. Mendel, 306 p. : [7] pl. ill.; 24–cm available at Gallica
- 1896: Théâtre sans prétention : le Bon moyen; Don Carlinos; le Passé; Bataille de princesses; le Joujou, L. Sauvaître, in-18, 213 p.;
- 1896: Valse parlée, dialogue pour un jeune homme et une jeune fille, O. Bornemann, in-12, 11 p.;
- 1897: Les Enfants terribles, dialogue pour une petite fille et un petit garçon, O. Bornemann, in-16, 14 p.;
- 1897: Histoire de brigands, dialogue pour une petite fille et un petit garçon, O. Bornemann, in-16, 11 p.;
- 1898: Dames seules, dialogue pour un jeune homme et une jeune fille, O. Bornemann, in-18, 18 p. available at Gallica
- 1898: Les Leçons du petit bossu…, Société d'édition et de librairie in-8, 119 p., fig.;
- 1898: La Mi-carême, dialogue pour un jeune homme et une jeune fille, O. Bornemann, (1898), in-16, 16 p.;
- 1898: Les Précautions inutiles, dialogue pour un jeune homme et une jeune fille, O. Bornemann, in-16, 17 p.;
- 1898: Nouveau théâtre de Guignol…, O. Bornemann, 2 vol. in-18 available at Gallica
- 1898: Les Ruses de Valentin, dialogue pour un jeune homme et une jeune fille, O. Bornemann, in-18, 18 p.;
- 1899: L'Enfant de troupe, histoire d'un orphelin…, Société d'édition et de librairie, in-16, 80 p., pl.;
- 1899: Ville d'eaux, monologue pour homme, dit par l'auteur, P.-V. Stock, in-12, 11 p.;
- 1902: Le Pain perdu, pièce en 1 acte, O. Bornemann, in-12, 21 p.;
- 1904: La Revue de l'année, pièce enfantine en 1 acte, avec chants, pour petites filles et petits garçons, O. Bornemann, in-18, paginé 99-120;
- 1904: Théâtre des marionnettes…, O. Bornemann, 2 vol. in-12, illustred cover available at Gallica
- 1905: Le roi Béta : conte de fées et d'enchanteurs, où il n'y a ni enchanteurs ni fées; illustrations by Albert Robida, Combet, 1 vol. (144 p.) : ill.; in-8; available at Gallica
- 1906: Vers de vase, amorces poétiques offertes aux pêcheurs malheureux, Bornemann, in-16, 152 p., illustrated cover;
- 1908: Les Pupazzi inédits : Les hommes de chambre; Les souvenirs d'un préfet de police; Les conspirations…, E. Flammarion, in-8., collection Auteurs célèbres; 437 available at Gallica
- 1911: Monologues et récits en vers et en prose, pour fillettes et jeunes filles, O. Bornemann, in-18, 131 p.;
- 1911: Monologues et récits en vers et en prose, pour petits garçons et jeunes gens, O. Bornemann, in-18, 108 p.;
- 1911: Ombres chinoises…, O. Bornemann, 1911, in-18, 173 p., fig.;
- 1911: Souvenir d'un montreur de Marionnettes, Maurice Bauche, in-8° (202 x 130), 348 p. available at Gallica
- 1912: Le Valet, comédie en 1 acte, G. Bornemann, in-18, 36 p.;
- Album de Noël et du nouvel an. Choix de monologues et pièces de circonstance de Lemercier de Neuville [et autres], O. Bornemann, (s. d.); in-16;
- Pour les fillettes…, O. Bornemann, in-16;
- Pour les garçonnets…, O. Bornemann, in-16 available at Gallica
- Pour les jeunes filles…, O. Bornemann, in-16;
- Dialogues en prose, pour petits garçons et jeunes gens…, O. Bornemann, in-16;
- Dialogues en prose, pour fillettes et jeunes filles, O. Bornemann, (s. d.), in-16, VIII-140 p.;
- Les pupazzi inédits, E. Flammarion, [18??], 246-8 pages available at Gallica

Drawings

- 1868: Mon village, scene with two characters including Bismarck, available at Gallica
- 1869: Une réunion publique, drawing, available at Gallica
- Le prévenu de l'affaire Névrosine Pétard, drawing, available at Gallica
- 1895: Sarah Bernhardt drawing and text available at Gallica
- 1895: Alphonse Daudet, portrait and biographical note, available at Gallica
- 1895: Alexandre Dumas fils, portrait and drawing, available at Gallica
- 1895: Félix Faure, portrait and biographical note, available at Gallica
- 1895: Victor Hugo, portrait and biographical note, available at Gallica
- 1895: Louise Michel, portrait and biographical note, available at Gallica
- 1895: Henri Rochefort, portrait and biographical note, available at Gallica
- 1895: Francisque Sarcey, portrait and biographical note, available at Gallica
- Victorien Sardou, portrait and biographical note, available at Gallica
- Séverine, portrait and biographical note, available at Gallica
- Émile Zola, portrait and text, available at Gallica
- Louis Bouilhet, portrait and drawing, 08... available at Gallica
- Paul Féval, portrait, drawing, 18… available at Gallica
- Victor Hugo, portrait, drawing, 18… available at Gallica
- Victor Hugo in front of the Comédie Française, foot portrait, 18... available at Gallica
- Antoine Renard, portrait, 18... available at Gallica
- Gioacchino Rossini, portrait, drawing, 18… available at Gallica
- Jacques Offenbach, portrait, drawing, 18… available at Gallica
- Croquis de scène, drawing, 18…available at Gallica
- Le Noël des marionnettes, drawing, 18… available at Gallica

== Sources ==
- J.-F. Vaudin, Gazetiers et gazettes : histoire critique et anecdotique de la presse parisienne, années 1858, 1860.
