= Guillaume Garot =

French politician

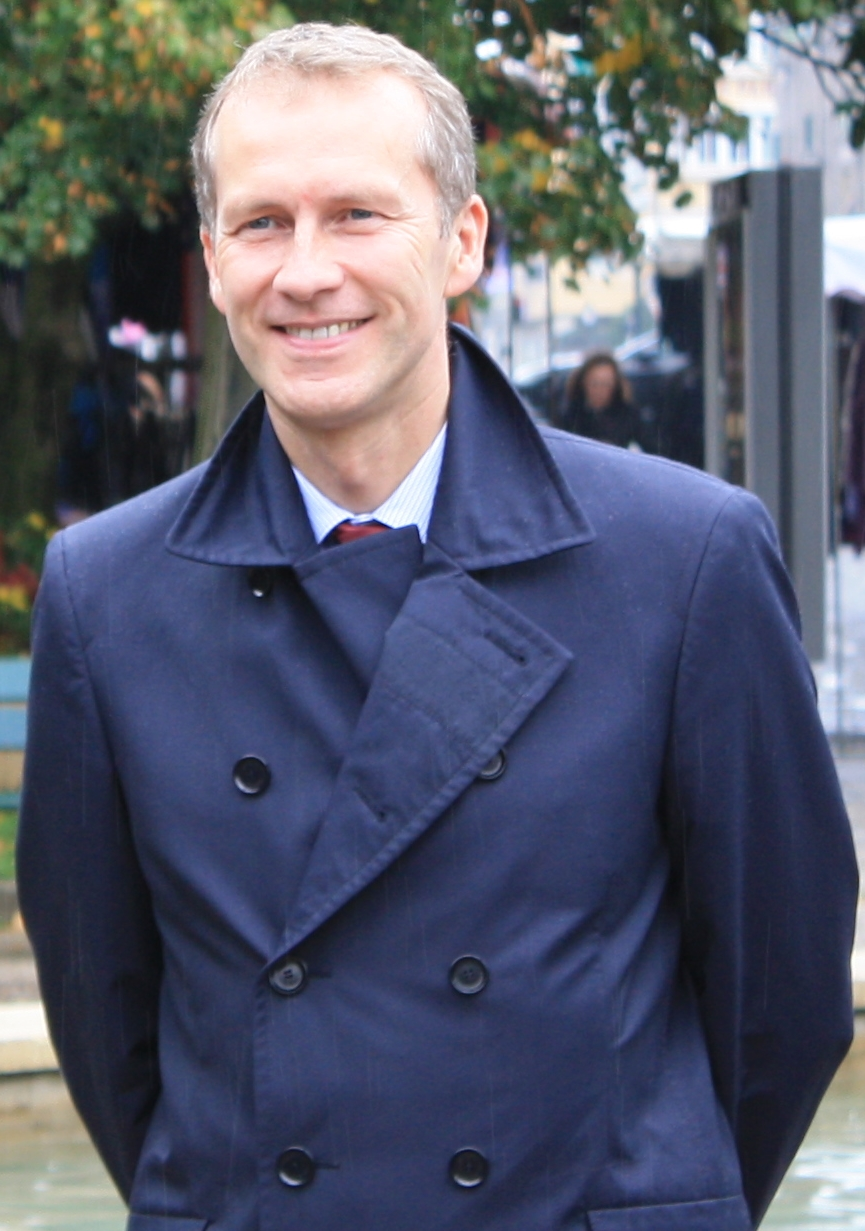

Member of the National Assembly for Mayenne's 1st constituency
- Incumbent
- Assumed office 2 May 2014
- Preceded by: Sylvie Pichot
- In office 17 June 2007 – 17 June 2012
- Preceded by: Henri Houdouin
- Succeeded by: Sylvie Pichot

French Minister for Food Industry
- In office 2012–2014
- President: François Hollande
- Prime Minister: Jean-Marc Ayrault
- Succeeded by: Stéphane Le Foll

Mayor of Laval
- In office 2008–2012
- Preceded by: François d'Aubert
- Succeeded by: Jean-Christophe Boyer

Personal details
- Born: 29 May 1966 (age 60) Laval, France
- Party: Socialist Party
- Education: Pantheon-Sorbonne University; Sciences Po

Guillaume Garot (French pronunciation: [ɡijom ɡaʁo]; born 29 May 1966) is a French politician of the Socialist Party (PS) who has served as a member of the National Assembly from 2007 until 2012 and since 2014, representing the Mayenne department. From 2012 until 2014, he was Junior Minister for the Food Industry under minister Stéphane Le Foll in the government of Prime Minister Jean-Marc Ayrault.

== Political career ==
Garot became a member of the National Assembly in the 2007 French legislative election. During his first term in parliament, he served on the Committee on Economic Affairs (2007-2009) and the Defence Committee (2009-2012) before his appointment to the government. In addition to his activities in national politics, he was the mayor of Laval from 2008 until 2012.

At the Socialist Party's Reims Congress in 2008, Garot supported Ségolène Royal's candidacy as party leader; she eventually lost against Martine Aubry. From 2011, he also worked as spokesperson for Royal's campaign to become the party's candidate for the 2012 French presidential election.

While in government, Garot oversaw the French government's response to the 2013 horse meat scandal.

After leaving government in 2014, Garot was part of the Finance Committee (2014-2015) and the Committee on Legal Affairs (2014-2017). Since 2017, he has been serving on the Committee on Sustainable Development and Regional Planning. In 2015, he was the parliament's rapporteur on legislation obliging supermarkets to hand over unused food to charity and not destroy leftover products.

In addition to his committee assignments, Garot is part of the French-Japanese Parliamentary Friendship Group and the French-Tunisian Parliamentary Friendship Group.

== Other activities ==
- National Council on Food (CNA), Chairman (2016-2019)

== Political positions ==
In July 2019, Garot voted against the French ratification of the European Union’s Comprehensive Economic and Trade Agreement (CETA) with Canada.

In 2023, Garot publicly endorsed the re-election of the Socialist Party's chairman Olivier Faure.
