= Lucienne de Saint-Mart =

French painter

Lucienne de Saint-Mart (French: [lysjɛn də sɛ̃ maʁ]; 8 October 1866 in Laval - 28 March 1953 in Laguna Beach, California) was a French painter who for eight years was a court painter for Czar Nicholas II of Russia.

== Biography ==
Lucienne de Saint-Mart was the daughter of French writer Louis Lemercier de Neuville. She was born in Laval, France in 1866 and trained as a painter from 1880.

Between 1910 and 1918, she was a portrait painter at the court of Nicholas II in Russia, where she painted miniatures of the tsar's children and a portrait of the tsar. She left Russia during the 1917 revolution.

Saint-Mart later lived in the United States, in New York City and New Orleans, before settling in California in 1934.
