= Hôtel de Ville, Laval =

Town hall in Laval, France

Hôtel de Ville
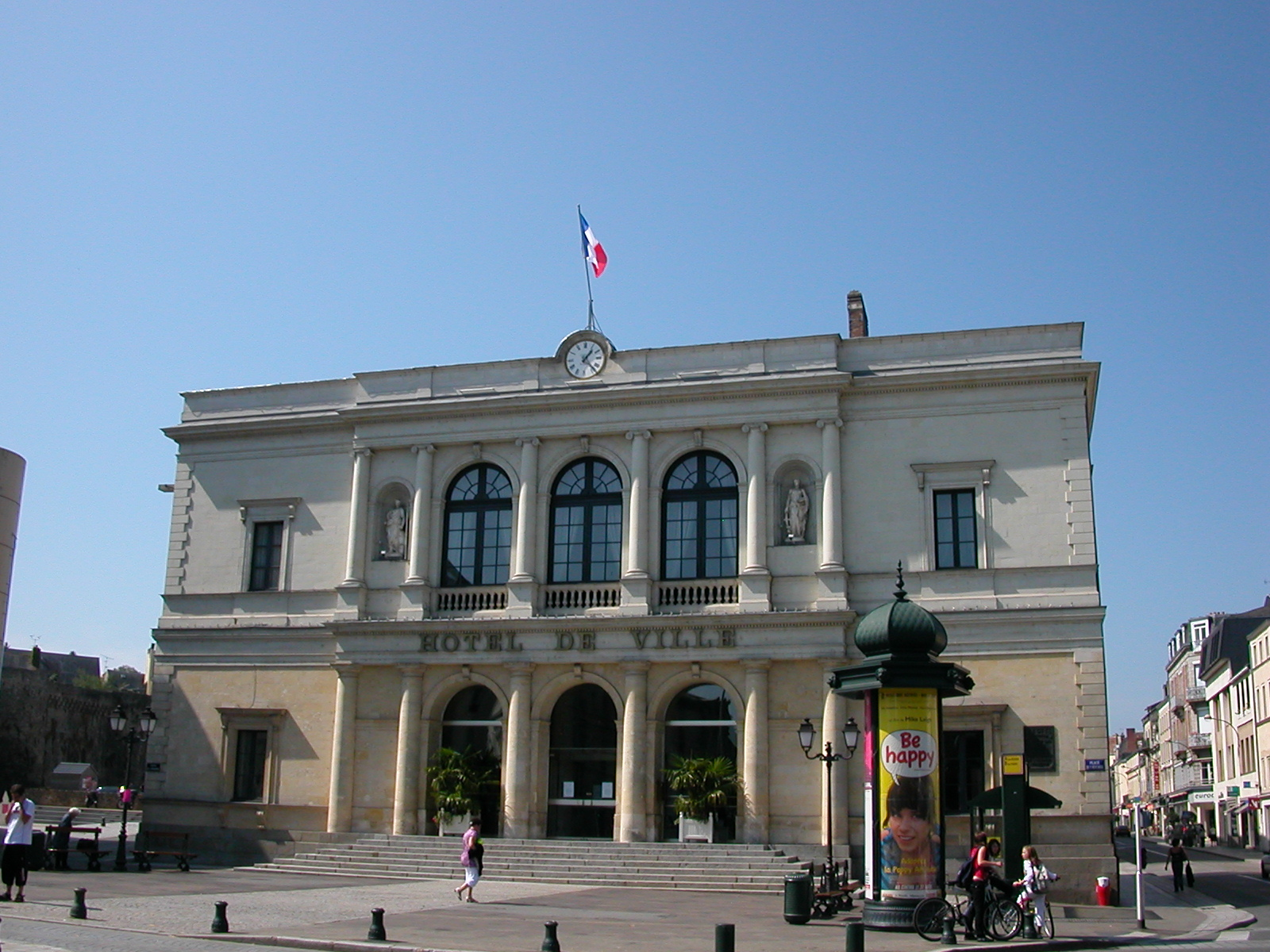
- The main frontage of the Hôtel de Ville in August 2008
- Interactive map of the Hôtel de Ville area

General information
- Type: City hall
- Architectural style: Neoclassical style
- Location: Laval, France
- Coordinates: 48.0706°N 0.7737°W
- Completed: 1831

Design and construction
- Architect: Alphonse de Gisors

The Hôtel de Ville (French pronunciation: [otɛl də vil], City Hall) is a municipal building in Laval, Mayenne, western France, standing on Place du 11-Novembre. It has been included on the Inventaire général des monuments by the French Ministry of Culture since 1995.

== History ==
The first municipal building in Laval was the Hôtel de Farcy on the west bank of the River Mayenne. It was built on an area of marshland, which was drained to allow development, for a local tax lawyer and minor aristocrat, Annibal de Farcy (1576–1650), in the mid-17th century. It was a substantial private house which was deemed suitable for municipal use when the town council were seeking offices in the second half of the 18th century.

In the early 19th century, the council decided to demolish the old building and to erect a purpose-built town hall a few meters away. Construction of the new building started in 1826. It was designed by Alphonse de Gisors in the neoclassical style, built in ashlar stone, and was completed in 1831.

The design involved a symmetrical main frontage of seven bays facing onto Place de la Mairie (now Place du 11-Novembre). The central section of five bays, which was slightly projected forward, featured a short flight of steps leading up to three round headed openings with moulded surrounds and keystones. There were three round headed windows with moulded surrounds, keystones and balustrades on the first floor. The bays in the central section were separated by Doric order columns supporting an entablature on the ground floor, and by Ionic order columns supporting an entablature, a modillioned cornice and a parapet on the first floor. The outer bays of the central section featured niches containing statues, representing agriculture and commerce, on the first floor, and there was a clock in the centre of the parapet. The bays on the extreme left and extreme right of the building contained doorways with cornices on the ground floor, and casement windows with cornices on the first floor; there were quoins at the corners of the building. Internally, the principal room was the Salle du Conseil (council chamber) on the first floor.

The council chamber was also used for public events: on 3 January 1846, the pianist, Franz Liszt, performed a recital there, at a time when Lisztomania was at its height. A milestone, which had been placed by order of the Roman emperor, Constantius Chlorus, on the Roman road that connected Le Mans to Corseul, a provincial capital in present-day Brittany, and which had been recovered from the Church of Le Genest-Saint-Isle when it was demolished in 1887, was placed at the foot of the staircase in the town hall in the late 19th century.

Following the liberation of the town by American troops on 6 August 1944, during the Second World War, the mayor, Adolphe Beck, welcomed the chairman of the Provisional Government, General Charles de Gaulle, to the town hall and invited him to give a speech on 22 August 1944.
