= Lucien Jonas =

French painter

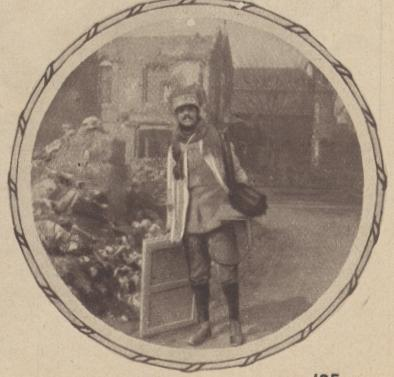
- Born: Lucien Hector Jonas; 8 April 1880; Anzin, France
- Died: 20 September 1947 (aged 67); Paris, France
- Occupation: Painter
- Honours: Official Painter of the French Air and Space Force

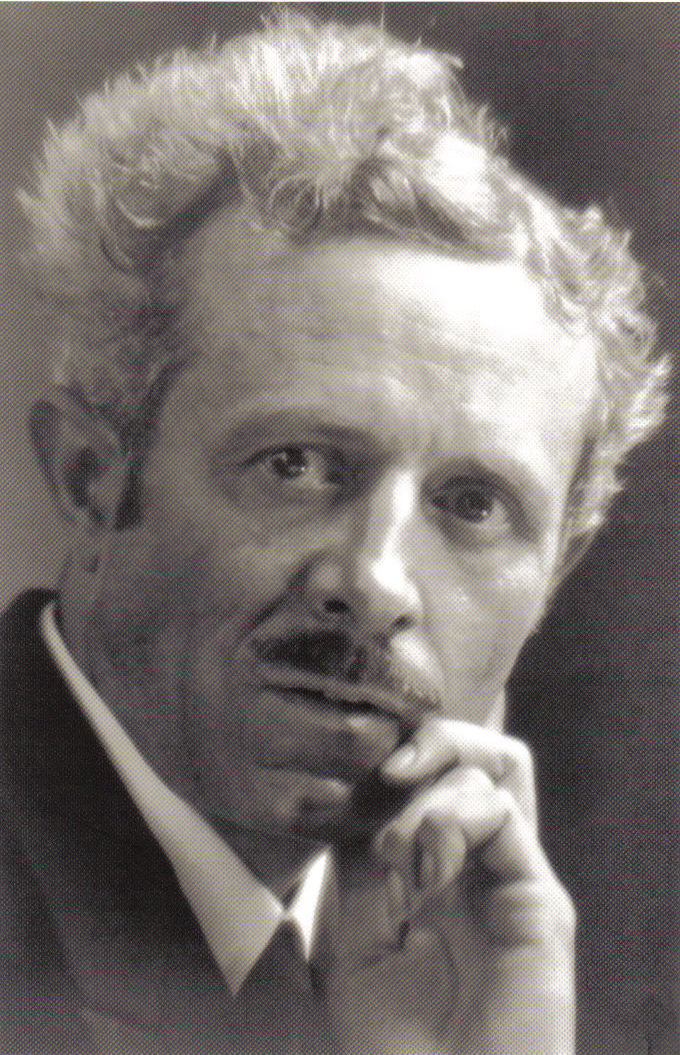
Lucien Jonas

Lucien Hector Jonas (8 April 1880 – 20 September 1947) was a French painter. His work was part of the painting event in the art competition at the 1932 Summer Olympics.
