= Daniel Tauvry =

French physician (1669–1701)

- Born: 21 September 1669; Laval, Maine (province), France
- Died: 17 March 1701 (aged 31); Paris
- Education: University of Angers, University of Paris
- Known for: Demonstration of circulation of the blood in the foetus
- Father: Ambroise Tauvry
- Awards: Elected to Académie des Sciences
- Scientific career
- Fields: Medicine, anatomy
- Institutions: University of Paris, Académie des Sciences
- Academic advisors: Joseph Guichard Duverney, Bernard Fontenelle

Daniel Tauvry (21 September 1669 – 18 March 1701) was a French physician and anatomist.

== Biography ==
He was the son of Ambroise Tauvry He was a medical doctor, and took Daniel to the hospital to train him in the observation and practice of medicine. He was his first teacher, and he made him make such rapid progress in letters and philosophy that before the age of ten he defended theses in logic. He then taught him the first elements of the art of healing, and took him to the beds of sick patients.

At the age of 13, he was sent to study in Paris by his father, where he studied for some time with Joseph Guichard Duverney, a distinguished anatomist. His early successes were such that he was able to take the degree of doctor from the Faculty of Medicine of Angers at the end of his fifteenth year. He returned to Paris, he studied anatomy and published his first work at the age of 18. He soon became known for two treatises, one on anatomy and the other on materia medica, after three years of study on therapy.

In 1690, a royal order deprived of the right to practice in Paris from the doctors who had not taken their degrees in the faculty of Paris obliged him to be immediately received as a doctor. He was a of the faculty of Paris in 1697. He became acquainted with Bernard Fontenelle who had him admitted as a student at the Academy of sciences, of which he became an associate-anatomist in 1699. Thanks to a new regulation, which increased the number of academicians, he became an associate member.

Strong in his convictions and supported by Duverney, he then took part in a dispute on the circulation of blood in the foetus by bringing an opinion contrary to that of Jean Méry, chief surgeon of the Hôtel-Dieu and anatomist. He put so much effort into the scientific struggle with this adversary who was wholehearted in his ideas, that his health was damaged. The phthisis declared itself irremediable from the beginning of the year 1700, but did not prevent him from publishing a treatise. He died in the month of February 1701. One of his compatriots, who signed himself L.D., and who had attended his burial, described it in these terms:

Today, ninth day of February 1701, my friends from Laval and I went to give the last homework to our young and learned compatriot Daniel Tauvry. His funeral took place at the Sainte-Geneviève church, his parish, in the midst of an incredible gathering of friends and quality people. The faculty, the academy, the medical profession, attended in full force. Such eagerness on the part of this elite crowd testified more eloquently than all the panegyrics in the world to the merit of the young doctor... Daniel Tauvry was only thirty-one years old and yet he already had a distinguished place in society and medicine... What a loss for the sciences, for his friends, for his family!

According to Fontenelle, who pronounced the eulogy at the academy, he had an extremely lively and penetrating mind; he added to the knowledge of anatomy the talent of conjecturing happily.

== Publications ==
- Nouvelle anatomie raisonnée, ou les usages de la structure du corps de l'homme et des autres animaux, suivant les lois des méchaniques, Paris, 1699;
- Traité des médicaments et de la manière de s'en servir pour la guérison des maladies, avec des formules pour leur composition, Estienne Michallet, 1690, 1699, 1711;
- Nouvelle pratique des maladies aiguës, et de toutes celles qui dépendent de la fermentation des liqueurs, ibid., 1698; 1706, 1720;
- Traité de la génération et de la nourriture du fœtus, ibid., 1700;
- Observations sur l'histoire du fœtus. Paris, 1699;
- Observations sur la rage ou hydrophobie. Paris, 1699;
- Pratique des maladies chroniques, published posthumously in 1712.
- Nouvelle anatomie raisonnée, ou l'on explique les Usages de la structure du corps de l'Homme et de quelques animaux suivant les loix des mécaniques, Barthélemy Girin, Paris, 3rd edition 1698;
- Traité de la génération et de la nourriture du fœtus, Barthélemy Girin, Paris, 1700
