= Official Painter of the French Air and Space Force =

Honorary title in France

In France, the title of Official Painter of the French Air Force is granted by the French Minister of Defence to artists who have devoted their talent to aeronautics and space. It can be attributed not only to painters but also to photographers, illustrators, engravers and sculptors.

== Rights and particular benefits ==
The title does not grant any right to compensation but provides certain benefits and special advantages:

- opportunity to work on the facilities of the French Air Force;
- granted painters are considered, only under the Protocol, to the rank of Captain, untitled painters to Commander;
- The artist may attach to his signature a wing surmounted by a star, hallmark of official painters of the air and space;
- in connection with the DRHAA - "Sub-Directorate Accompagnement" and more particularly one of the services, the "Bureau Armée de l'Air dans la Nation" (BAAN).

The official artist has a moral obligation to include in its annual production some aeronautical nature works, serving the cause and the reputation of the military and civil aviation.

Approved painters are appointed for three years by a jury headed by the General Inspector of the Armed Forces (Air). The jury, under the History Department of Defense, shall submit to the Minister for Defence the list of candidates for an initial accreditation, renewal of accreditation or tenure. The jury is composed of officers of the French Air Force, entitled painters and personalities from art and / or aeronautics. To become an entitled painter, painters must have been approved over three successive periods of three years.

The maximum number of licensed painters is twenty, the number of entitled painters is not limited.

== History ==
The "body of painters, engravers and sculptors of the Department of the Air" (or "Armies' painters, Air specialty") was created in 1931 by the Air Minister Jean-Louis Dumesnil.

An official meeting is held every two years and is the location and privileged manifestation of the Air Painters' artistic commitment. It takes place under the authority of the Ministry of Defence.

In 1987, the "Painters of the Air and Space" association is created to fulfill a need to independently develop links with state or private organizations with aeronautical vocation, to bring an amateur public by putting up exhibitions and uphold the moral and material interests of its members.

A traveling exhibition managed by the French armies' Information and public relations service] and a blog now complete representation of the association.

== Official Painters of the French Air Force ==
=== Contemporary painters ===
- Jean-Pierre Alaux (nominated in 1993)
- Éric Bari (nominated in 2005)
- Yannick Batogé (nominated in 2005)
- Michel Bellion (nominated in 2011)
- Jean Clermont (nominated in 2003)
- Pierre-André Cousin (nominated in 2009)
- Francis Dartois (nominated in 1989, entitled in 1996)
- Christoff Debusschere (nominated in 1992, entitled in 2004)
- Thierry De Gorostarzu (nominated in 2008)
- Alain Fradet (nominated in 2008)
- Jean-Michel Golfier (nominated in 1987, entitled in 1999)
- André Gréard (nominated in 1989, entitled in 1992)
- Christophe Grimonpon (nominated in 2011)
- Max Hervé (nominated in 1992, entitled in 2004)
- Serge Jamois (nominated in 2000)
- Pascal Jouffroy (nominated in 1992, entitled in 2004)
- Tiennick Kerevel (nominated in 2008)
- Yong-Man Kwon (nominated in 2005)
- Lionel Labeyrie (nominated in 1996, entitled in 2007)
- Pierre Lebrun (nominated in 2003)
- Nelly Lengellé
- Jean-Claude Marchal (nominated in 2008)
- Serge Markó (nominated in 1987, entitled in 1992)
- Florent Maussion (nominated in 2011)
- Jean-Pierre Michel (nominated in 1996)
- Philippe Mitchké (nominated in 1987)
- Michel Montigné (nominated in 1998)
- Jean Noël (nominated in 1986, entitled in 1992)
- Lucio Perinotto (nominated in 1992, entitled in 2004)
- Jean-Jacques Petit (nominated in 1989, entitled in 2004)
- Jame's Prunier (nominated in 1992, entitled in 2004)
- Béatrice Roche Gardies (nominated in 2011)
- Jacques Rohaut (nominated in 1996)
- Alain Royer (nominated in 2008)
- Stéphane Ruais (nominated in 2000)
- Claude Schürr (nominated in 1986, entitled in 1996)
- Madeleine Tezenas du Moncel (nominated in 1992, entitled in 2004)
- Gérard Weygand (anominated in 1992, entitled in 2004)

=== Deceased painters ===
- Georges Beuville (1902 - 1982, nominated in ..)
- Albert Brenet (1903 - 2005, nominated in 1931)
- Raoul du Gardier (1871 - 1952, nominated in 1936)
- Géo Ham (1900 - 1972, nominated in 1931)
- Jean-Theobald Jacus (1924 - 2021, nominated in 1986, entitled in 1992)
- Marcel Jeanjean (1893 - 1973, nominated in 1933)
- Lucien Jonas (1880 - 1947, nominated in 1932)
- Guy Le Borgne, alias Guy Lezachmeur (1920 - 2007, nominated in ...)
- Paul Lengellé (1908 - 1993, nominated in 1936)
- Claude Mazier (nominated in 1986, entitled in 1992)
- Michel Tesmoingt (1928 - 2011, nominated in 1989)

== See also ==
- Air and Space Museum
- Defence Historical Service
  - Peintre de la Marine
