= Laval, Mayenne =

Laval
- Prefecture and commune
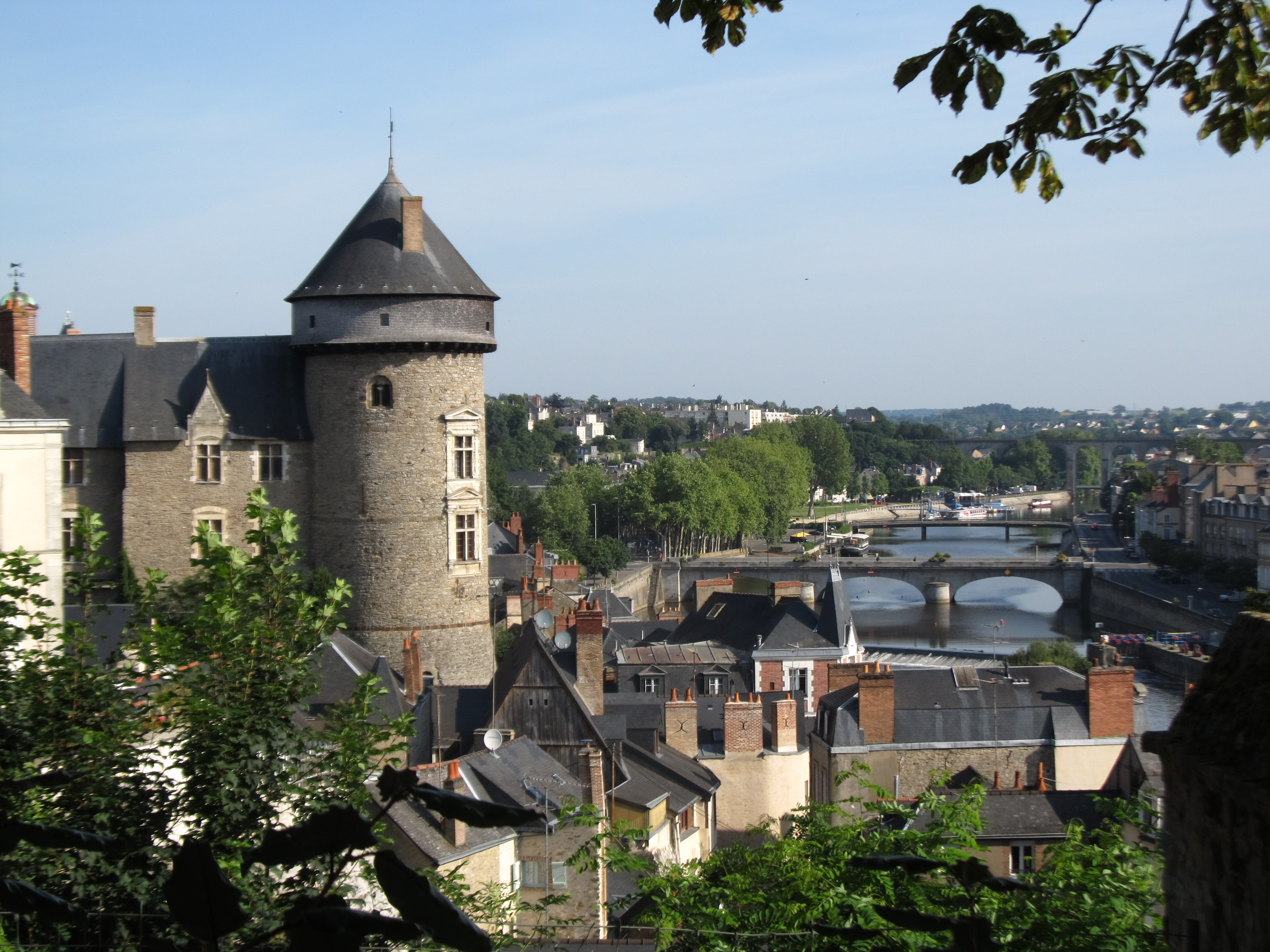
- The castle overlooking the town and the river Mayenne.

- Coat of arms
- Location of Laval
- Location within France Location within Pays de la Loire
- Coordinates: 48°04′24″N 0°46′08″W
- Country: France
- Region: Pays de la Loire
- Department: Mayenne
- Arrondissement: Laval
- Canton: 3 cantons
- Intercommunality: Laval Agglomération

Government
  - Mayor (2020–2026): Florian Bercault (PS)
- Area^{1}: 34.2 km^{2} (13.2 sq mi)
  - Urban: 101.0 km^{2} (39.0 sq mi)
  - Metro: 1,434.8 km^{2} (554.0 sq mi)
- Highest elevation: 122 m (400 ft)
- Lowest elevation: 42 m (138 ft)
- Population (2023): 49,400
  - Density: 1,440/km^{2} (3,740/sq mi)
  - Urban (2022): 63,340
  - Urban density: 627.1/km^{2} (1,624/sq mi)
  - Metro (2022): 145,225
  - Metro density: 101.22/km^{2} (262.15/sq mi)
- Demonym(s): Lavallois (masculine); Lavalloise (feminine)
- Time zone: UTC+01:00 (CET)
  - Summer (DST): UTC+02:00 (CEST)
- INSEE/Postal code: 53130 /53000
- ^{1} French Land Register data, which excludes lakes, ponds, glaciers > 1 km^{2} (0.386 sq mi or 247 acres) and river estuaries.

Laval (French pronunciation: [laval]) is a town in western France, about 300 km (190 mi) west-southwest of Paris, and the capital of the Mayenne department. Its inhabitants are called Lavallois. The commune of Laval proper, without the metropolitan area, is the 9th most populous in the Pays de la Loire region.

A part of the traditional province of Maine before the French Revolution, which now split between two departments, Mayenne and Sarthe, Laval also lies on the threshold of Brittany and is not far from Normandy and Anjou. It was thus an important stronghold in northwestern France during the Middle Ages. Laval became a city during the 11th century, and was the cradle of the House of Laval, one of the most powerful families in Maine and Brittany. The counts of Laval developed a textile industry around 1300 and made Laval a significant centre for the French Renaissance a century later. The linen industry remained the principal activity in Laval until the 20th century, when milk processing became more profitable.

Laval developed around a promontory, on which the castle was built, and along the river Mayenne. The Laval metropolitan area is a small economic centre in western France, particularly active in the industrial sector, dairy production, electronics and chemicals. Laval is economically oriented towards Rennes, the administrative capital of the region of Brittany, and located only 80 kilometres (50 miles) west of Laval.

Laval proper covers 34.2 square kilometres (13.2 sq mi) and has a population of 49,400 inhabitants, while about 145,000 live in its metropolitan area (1,435 square kilometres (554 sq mi)). The Laval Agglomération intercommunality is made up of 34 communes covering 686 square kilometres (265 sq mi) with 115,000 inhabitants.

Laval is notably the birthplace of Henri Rousseau, a major Naïve painter, and the town has a museum dedicated to him and other Naïve artists. Laval also enjoys a significant architectural heritage, with its castle, portions of city walls, medieval houses, old bridges and churches.

== Toponymy ==
Laval is a relatively new foundation in comparison to other French cities. That is to say that the borough was not officially mentioned prior to the 11th century. According to legend glorifying the Counts of Laval, mediaeval chroniclers portrayed the citizens of Laval as being the offspring of Charles Martel's grandson Wala of Corbie. By virtue of the chroniclers' accounts, Laval should be a synonym for "Vala" or "Valla"—the two spelling variants of "Wala".

Etymologically spoken, however, the name of Laval, in all likelihood, merely stands for "the valley" in French ("la vallée" in contemporary language), to capture the lush valley of the Mayenne river, wherein Laval is situated. This name commonly appears in other French location names, sometimes with a second word, such as in Laval-d'Aurelle (Ardèche) or Laval-sur-Doulon (Haute-Loire).

The first mention of the town was the Latin Vallis Guidonis, meaning "Guy's valley", because the counts of Laval were all called Guy. On its side, the castle was usually named Castrum Guidonis or Aula Guidonis ("Guy's castle" and "Guy's palace"). During the 11th century, Laval is also called Castrum Vallis or simply Vallis; and Lavallis appears in 1080. Other Latin names include Valles and Castrum de Valibus. Lavallum Guidonis is first written in 1239. After the Renaissance, Lavallis and Lavallium are both commonly used by the clergy and the scholars.

As in Latin, the name evolved in French from Laval-Guion or Laval-Guyon to Laval in one single word. Laval is one of the few cities in the world to have a palindrome as a name, as Laval can be read the same way in either direction.

== Geography ==
=== Location ===
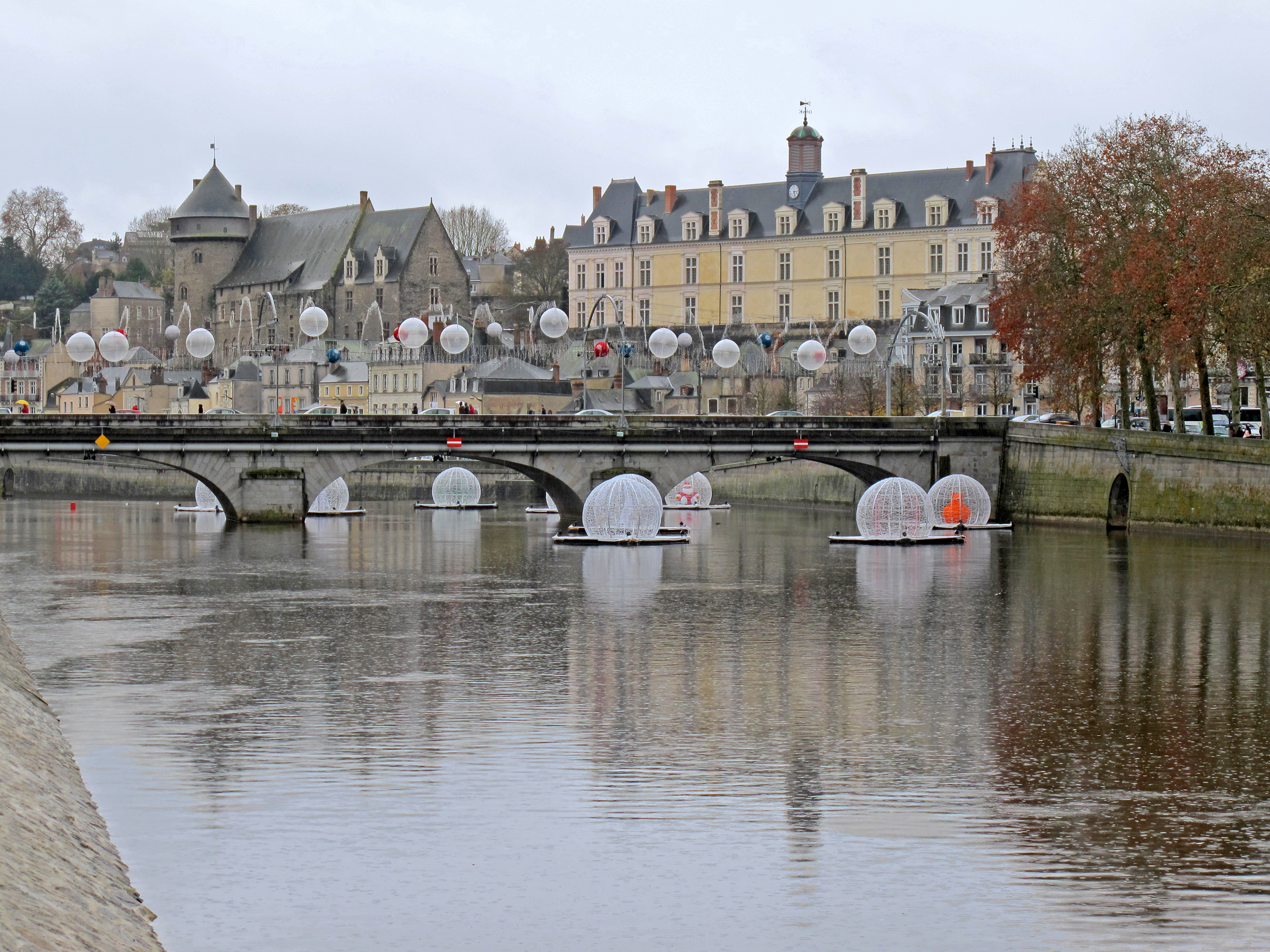
The Mayenne river in the town centre.

Laval is located at the geographical centre of the Mayenne department, on the road which connects Paris to Brittany, between Rennes and Le Mans. The town is situated on the middle course of the Mayenne, a river which has its source in Normandy and runs towards the Loire crossing the Mayenne department from North to South.

Laval is located approximately 70 kilometres (43 miles) from Rennes, 75 kilometres (47 miles) from Le Mans and Angers, 130 km (81 miles) from Nantes, 135 km (84 miles) from Tours, 150 km (93 miles) from Caen and 280 km (174 miles) from Paris. It is also 100 km (62 miles) far from Le Mont-Saint-Michel and the surrounding sea resorts, located on the English Channel.

Elevation varies between 42 and 122 meters above sea level. Laval is, in fact, a hilly town, marked by a rocky promontory dominating the valley of the Mayenne river. The castle was built on this promontory and the medieval centre spreads around. The promontory and the slightly hilly landscape around Laval are traces of the Armorican Massif, an old range of mountains that forms the Breton peninsula.

The town is surrounded by agricultural land essentially made of large fields. The traditional bocage with its old hedgerows is still partially visible. Laval is also surrounded by several forests, such as the Forêt de Concise, with c. 600 hectares, and the Bois de l'Huisserie, with 254 hectares. Both are located south of the town.

=== Metropolitan area ===
The commune of Laval is bordered by seven other communes. These are, clockwise, Changé, Bonchamp-lès-Laval, Forcé, Entrammes, L'Huisserie, Montigné-le-Brillant and Saint-Berthevin. Saint-Berthevin forms part of the agglomeration, and Changé and Bonchamp-lès-Laval are well integrated, but the other communes remain rural areas with villages and hamlets. 26 other communes situated farther form with them the Communauté d'agglomération Laval Agglomération. They unite c. 113,000 inhabitants.

=== Climate ===
Laval enjoys a very mild climate because of its proximity with the Atlantic Ocean and the English Channel, giving it an oceanic climate. Winters are usually wet, with scarce frosts and snowfalls, and summers are warm and sunny, although rainfalls are common.

Climate data for Laval-Etronnier (1991–2020 normals, extremes 2010–present)
Month	Jan	Feb	Mar	Apr	May	Jun	Jul	Aug	Sep	Oct	Nov	Dec	Year
Record high °C (°F)	15.1 (59.2)	19.6 (67.3)	23.5 (74.3)	27.3 (81.1)	29.1 (84.4)	37.8 (100.0)	39.3 (102.7)	38.2 (100.8)	34.5 (94.1)	29.6 (85.3)	20.5 (68.9)	16.7 (62.1)	39.3 (102.7)
Mean daily maximum °C (°F)	8.2 (46.8)	9.3 (48.7)	12.6 (54.7)	15.6 (60.1)	19.0 (66.2)	22.4 (72.3)	24.6 (76.3)	24.7 (76.5)	21.5 (70.7)	16.6 (61.9)	11.6 (52.9)	8.6 (47.5)	16.2 (61.2)
Daily mean °C (°F)	5.4 (41.7)	5.9 (42.6)	8.3 (46.9)	10.7 (51.3)	14.0 (57.2)	17.2 (63.0)	19.1 (66.4)	19.2 (66.6)	16.3 (61.3)	12.7 (54.9)	8.5 (47.3)	5.8 (42.4)	11.9 (53.4)
Mean daily minimum °C (°F)	2.7 (36.9)	2.4 (36.3)	4.1 (39.4)	5.7 (42.3)	9.0 (48.2)	11.9 (53.4)	13.7 (56.7)	13.7 (56.7)	11.1 (52.0)	8.8 (47.8)	5.4 (41.7)	3.0 (37.4)	7.6 (45.7)
Record low °C (°F)	−7.7 (18.1)	−10.7 (12.7)	−4.9 (23.2)	−3.0 (26.6)	−1.0 (30.2)	5.0 (41.0)	7.5 (45.5)	7.5 (45.5)	3.3 (37.9)	−1.2 (29.8)	−5.6 (21.9)	−5.6 (21.9)	−10.7 (12.7)
Average precipitation mm (inches)	74.0 (2.91)	55.0 (2.17)	53.9 (2.12)	55.0 (2.17)	63.9 (2.52)	53.3 (2.10)	48.1 (1.89)	51.3 (2.02)	50.1 (1.97)	79.1 (3.11)	76.0 (2.99)	87.4 (3.44)	757.1 (29.81)
Average precipitation days (≥ 1.0 mm)	12.3	10.0	9.3	9.8	9.7	7.7	7.5	7.6	8.2	11.4	11.7	12.6	117.7
Mean monthly sunshine hours	63.4	85.5	125.3	151.5	197.2	214.2	207.6	216.9	164.5	105.2	69.2	54.9	1,655.4
Source 1: Meteociel
Source 2: Infoclimat (sun 1981–2010)

=== Urban morphology ===
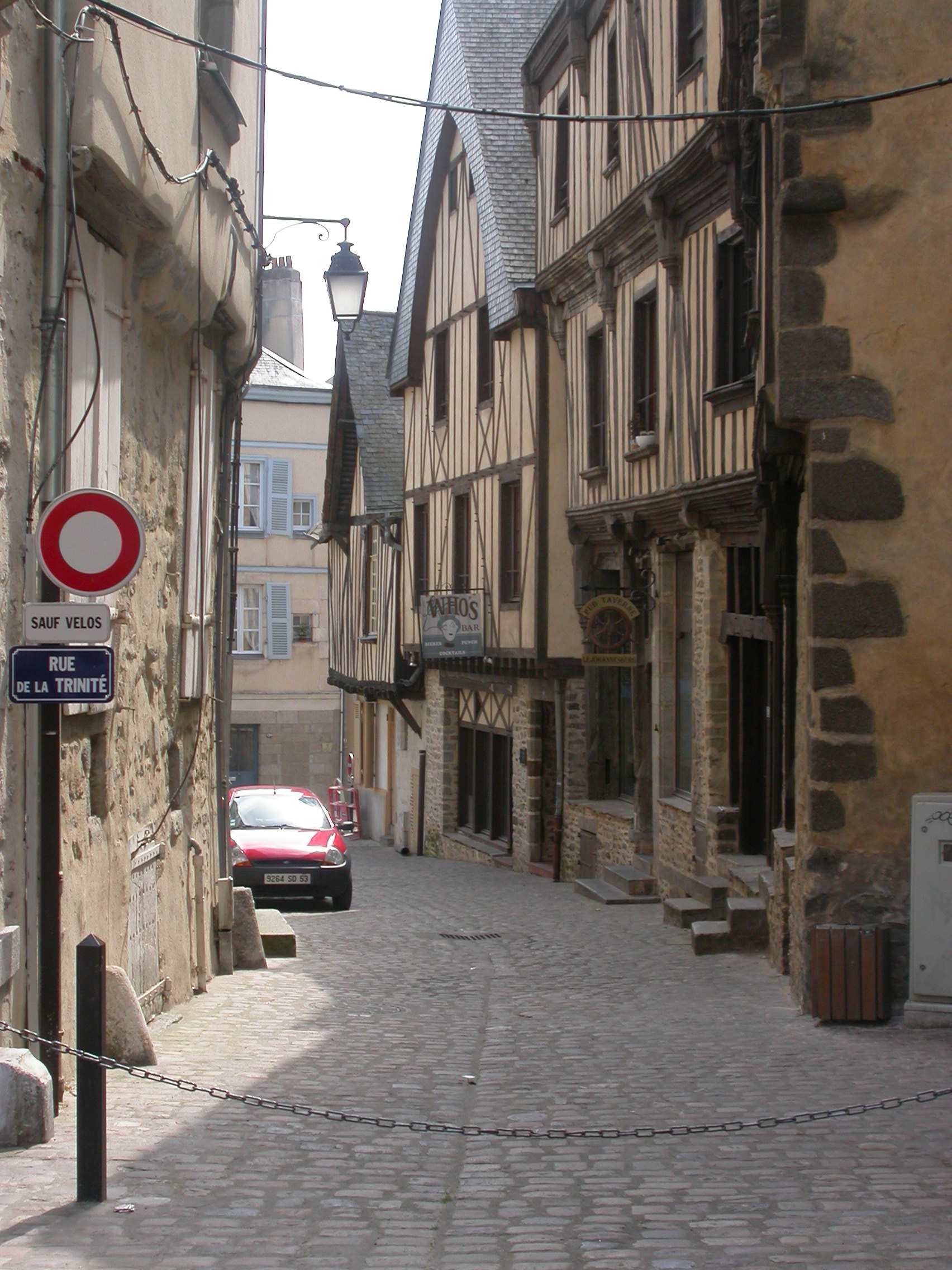
A street in the medieval centre.

The oldest streets and buildings in Laval are located around the promontory where the castle stands. The urban structure there dates back from the Middle Ages and is limited to the western bank of the Mayenne river. This old core is today the main shopping area, with several pedestrian streets and little shops. Several medieval half-timbered houses are still visible, but most of the buildings are dating from the 18th and 19th centuries and are made of tufa.

The suburb of Avesnières, located one kilometer (0.6 miles) south of the castle, is a former commune which merged with Laval in 1863. Founded in 1073, it still comprises several old houses and a medieval basilica. Other large medieval hamlets absorbed by the town include Le Bourg Hersend and Saint-Martin. The eastern bank of the Mayenne was also settled in the Middle Ages, along the street that leads to the bridge crossing the river, but it was mostly developed during the second half of the 19th century when the train station was built there. The old faubourgs surrounding the town centre date from the same period and are mainly composed of individual houses.

The 20th-century suburbs comprise some council estates but individual houses are much more common. Some shopping centres and several industrial areas are located on the outskirts of the town. Laval is encircled by a small ring road and the Paris-Rennes highway bypasses the town by the north.

Until the 20th century, Laval had had a port on the Mayenne river, which was surrounded by several factories, mainly linen manufactures. The old industrial areas were redeveloped after 1970 and the river has since become a recreational area.

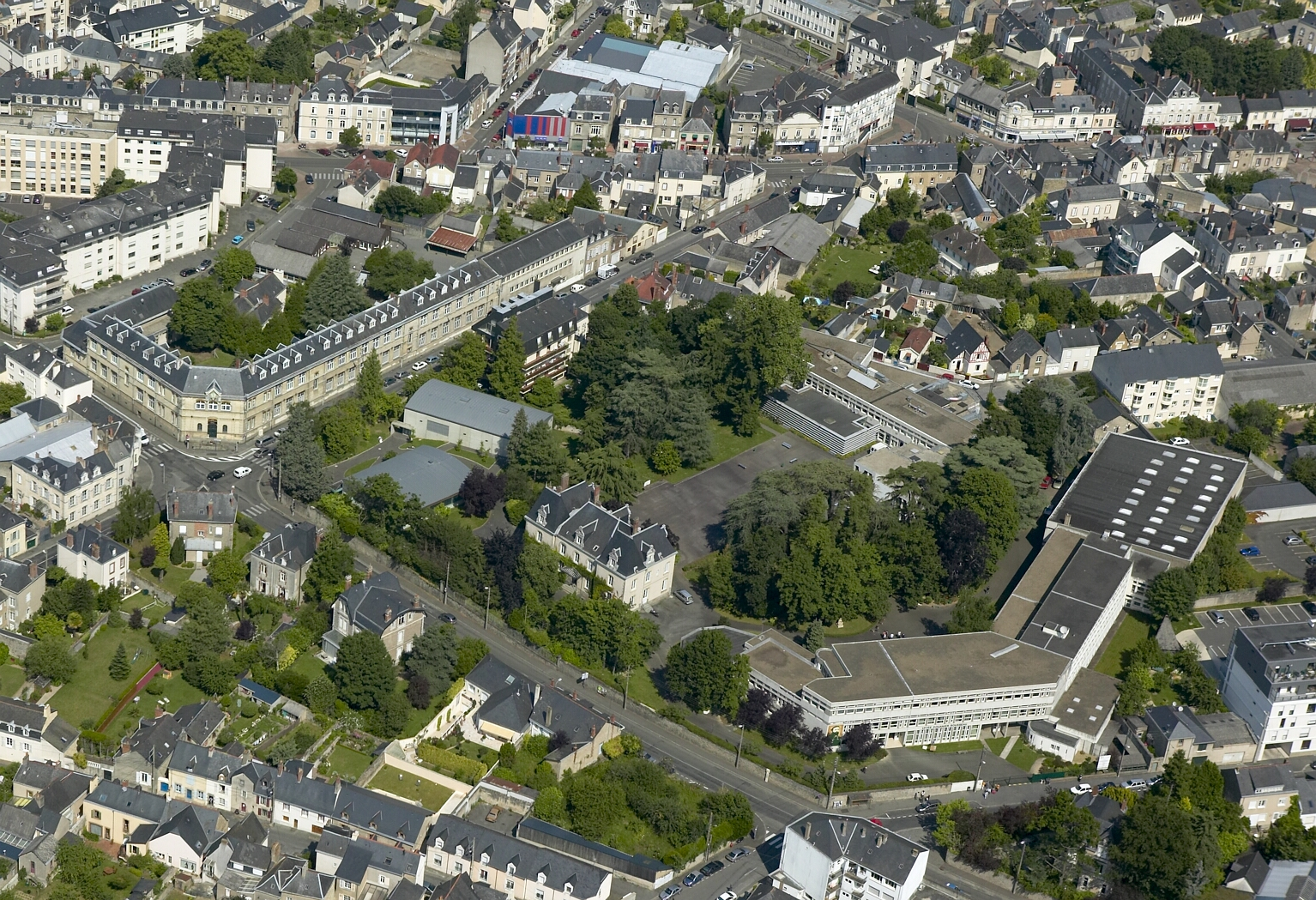
Aerial view of the Lycée Douanier Rousseau on the eastern bank of the Mayenne river.

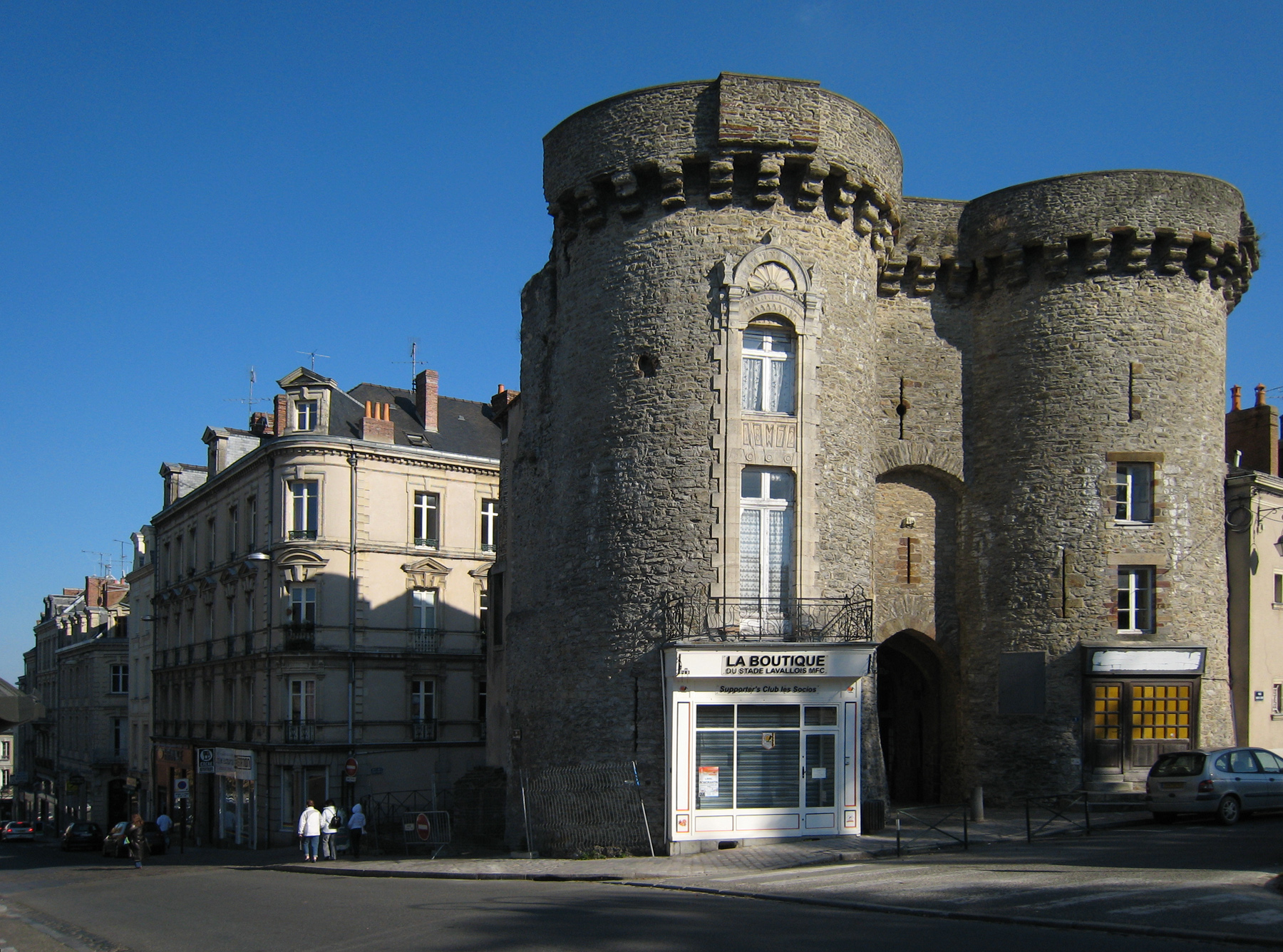
The medieval town is still encircled by several portions of city walls.

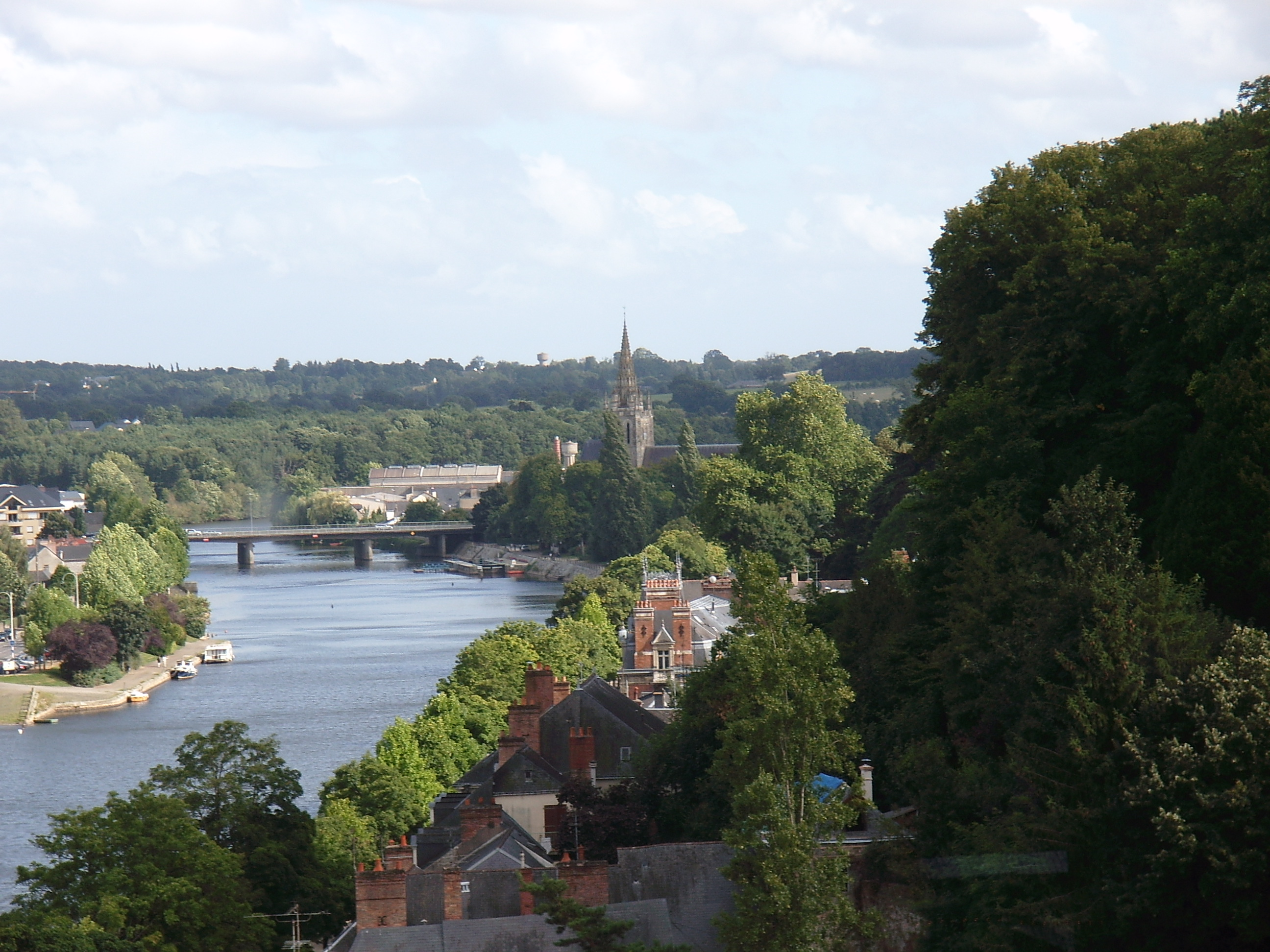
View on the Mayenne river and on the faubourg of Avesnières, south of the centre.

=== Green areas ===
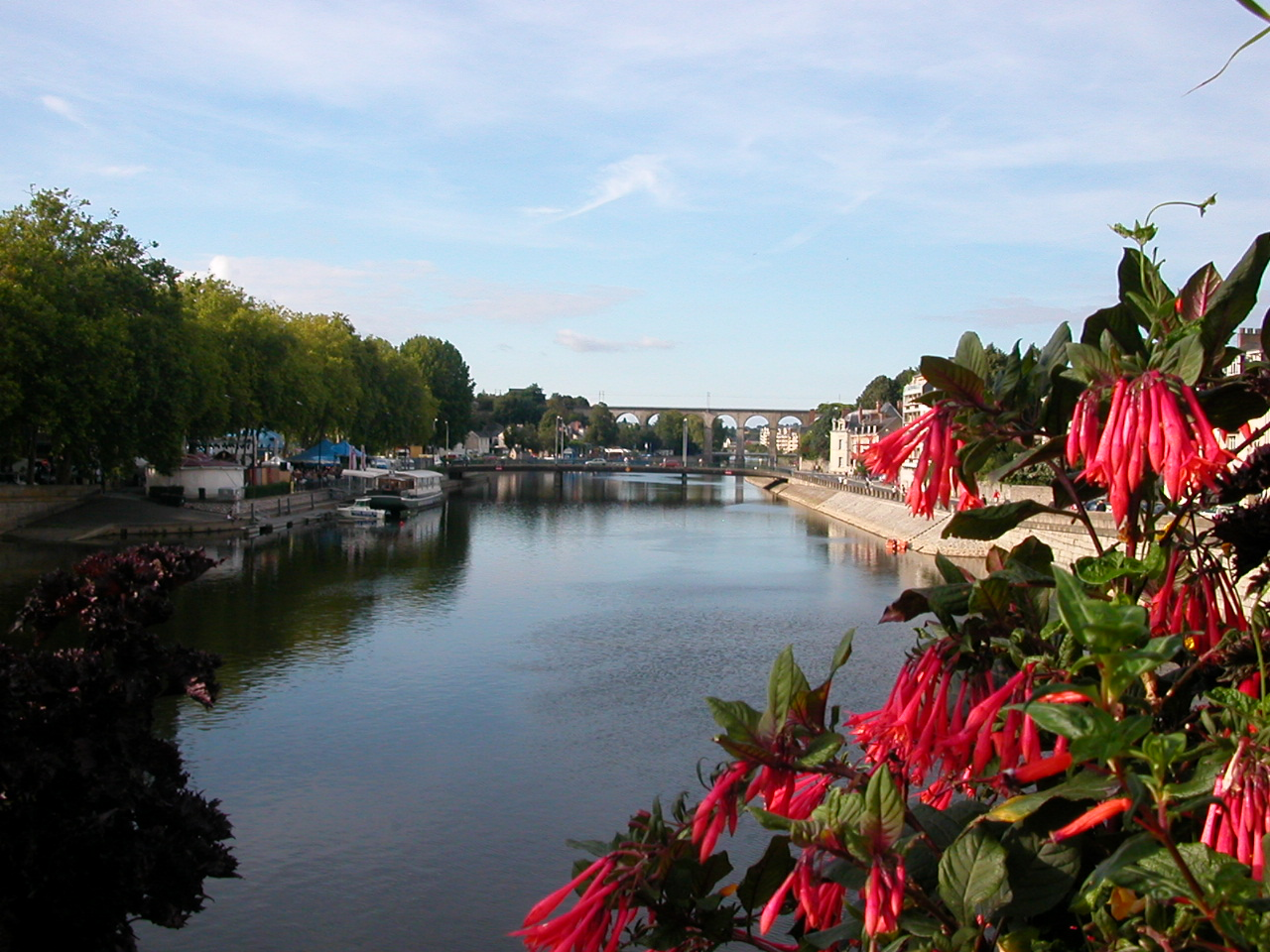
The Mayenne river banks.

Laval is a small town and nature is not far away from the centre. The town manages 25 hectares of parks and gardens, and 200 hectares of green areas in total.

The largest park is the Jardin de la Perrine, located in the centre, at the top of a rocky promontory. Formerly a private garden, it encircles an 18th-century mansion and comprises a French and an English garden as well as a rose garden, an orangery and a small menagerie. This park encompasses 4,5 hectares. Henri Rousseau, a major Naïve artist born in Laval, is buried there.

Apart from the Jardin de la Perrine, the main green areas in the centre are the Square de Boston, refurbished in 2012, and the Square Foch, located on the place du 11-Novembre, which is the central point of the town.

The commune of Laval owns the Bois Gamats, a 25 hectares wood located on the southern hedge of the town. The neighbouring Bois de l'Huisserie, much bigger, is managed by Laval Agglomération.

== History ==
=== Heraldry ===
The coat of arms of Laval

The coat of arms of Laval is: gules, a lion passant guardant. The coat of arms were those of the House of Laval, and not to the city, although several members of the family permitted the town to use their arms, notably in 1211, when the direct branch died, and in 1464.

The House of Laval had a motto, Eadem mensura ("of same measure"), which is sometimes associated with the town of Laval.

In 1987, the municipality adopted a logotype, replaced in 2010 by a new one which uses the heraldic lion as well as the palindrome as the two symbols of Laval. This logotype is made of "Laval" written in capital letters, with the final "L" held by the lion and reversed to suggest the palindrome.

=== Middle Ages ===
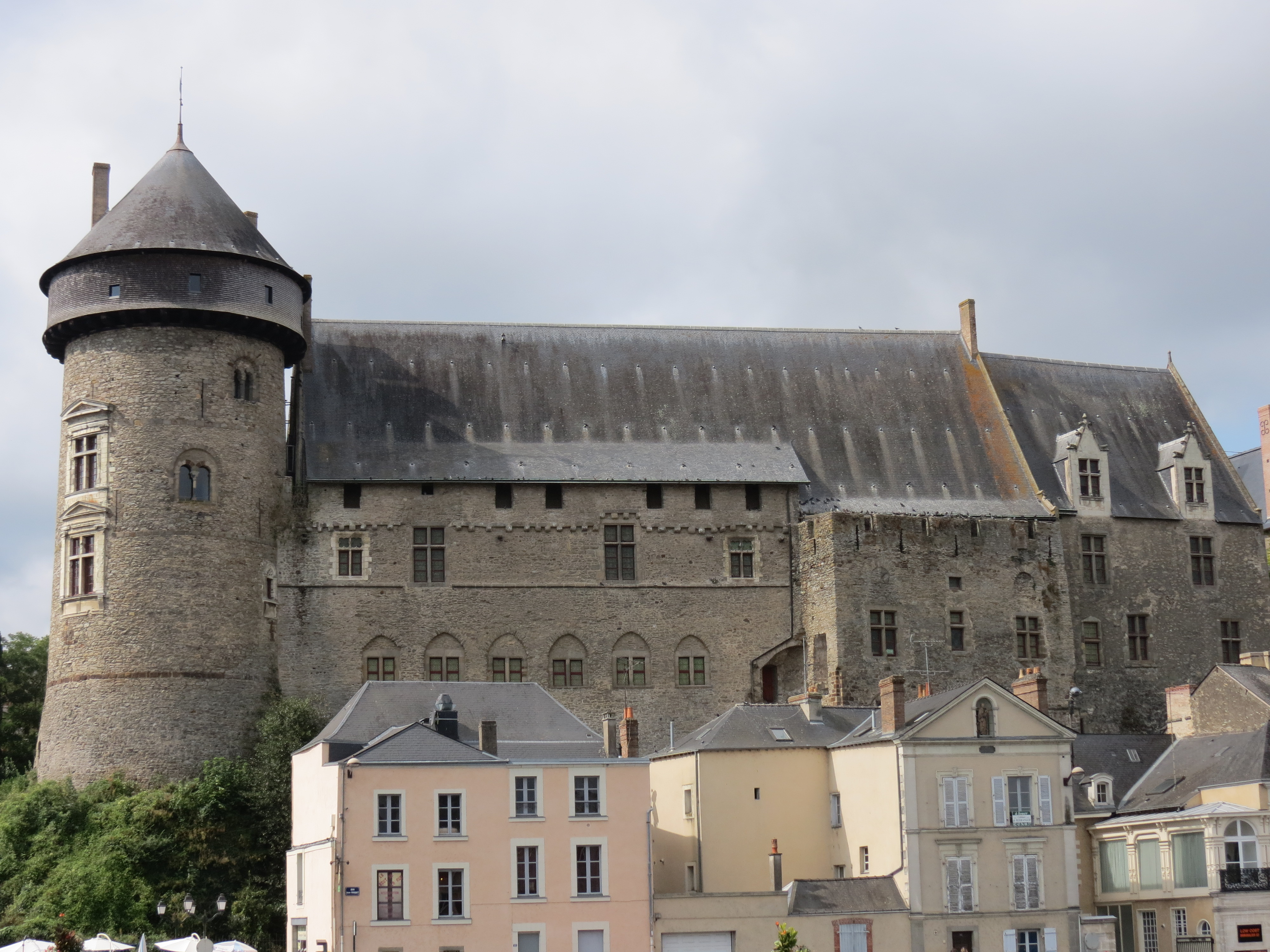
The castle of Laval and its 13th-century keep.

Before the construction of the castle during the 11th century, Laval did not exist. However, the site of the town was already a thoroughfare because it was located on the Roman road that connected Le Mans to Corseul, a provincial capital in present-day Brittany. Moreover, some parts of the city territory had been settled by the Gauls. For instance, a Gallic stele has been unearthed in the suburb of Pritz, north of the centre. The chapel of Pritz was on its side first mentioned in 710. The body of Tudwal, a Breton Saint, is believed to have been brought to Laval in 870 or 878, during a Norman invasion in Brittany.

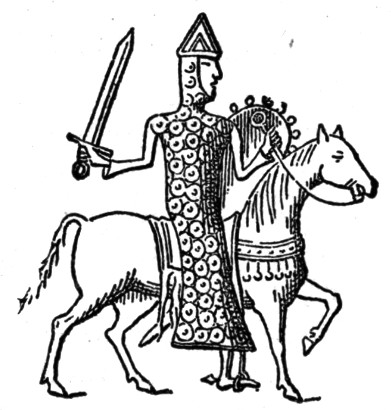
Guy II of Laval, second Lord of the town, after a seal from 1095.

The site of Laval had a strategic importance because the travelers taking the Roman road had to cross there the Mayenne river on a ford. The western bank of the river was further dominated by a rocky promontory which could ensure a total control on the ford. During the 10th century, a first military structure was built on it, and a villa was mentioned there at the end of the century in a charter issued by the count of Maine. Around 1020, Herbert I of Maine offered the new barony of Laval to Guy I, who became the first lord of the town. Guy I of Laval built a new castle and the town slowly appeared around the Roman road and on the river banks.

The castle built by Guy I was much wider than the present-day structure. It was encircled by an earthen wall and it spread from the present-day keep to the cathedral. A motte built over the wall commanded the access to the top of the promontory, where the Lords lived, and the second motte was probably located inside the compound. The basilica in Avesnières, located several kilometers south of the castle, was founded in the 12th century by Guy III. Around 1200, the earthen wall was pulled down and the castle became smaller, taking its present-day appearance. The town developed on its side its own defense system.

Beatrix of Gavere, the wife of Guy IX de Laval, who lived in the 13th century, is believed to be at the origin of the textile tradition of the town. Born in Flanders, she would have brought Flemish weavers with her, and would have encouraged linen production. Linen weaving remained the main economic activity of the town until the 19th century.

During the Hundred Years' War, the town was taken by the English commanded by John Talbot, in 1428. It became French again a year later. The fighting occasioned great damages and the town was fully rebuilt afterwards. Thus all the half-timbered houses that still stand in the medieval centre were not built before the 15th century. During that period, the town's walls were completed by the addition of a powerful artillery fort in an innovative design, known as the Tour Renaise. Around 1450, Guy XIV de Laval had the castle refurbished. New rooms and halls were built, and new Gothic windows were opened on the courtyard at the beginning of the 16th century.

=== Modern period ===
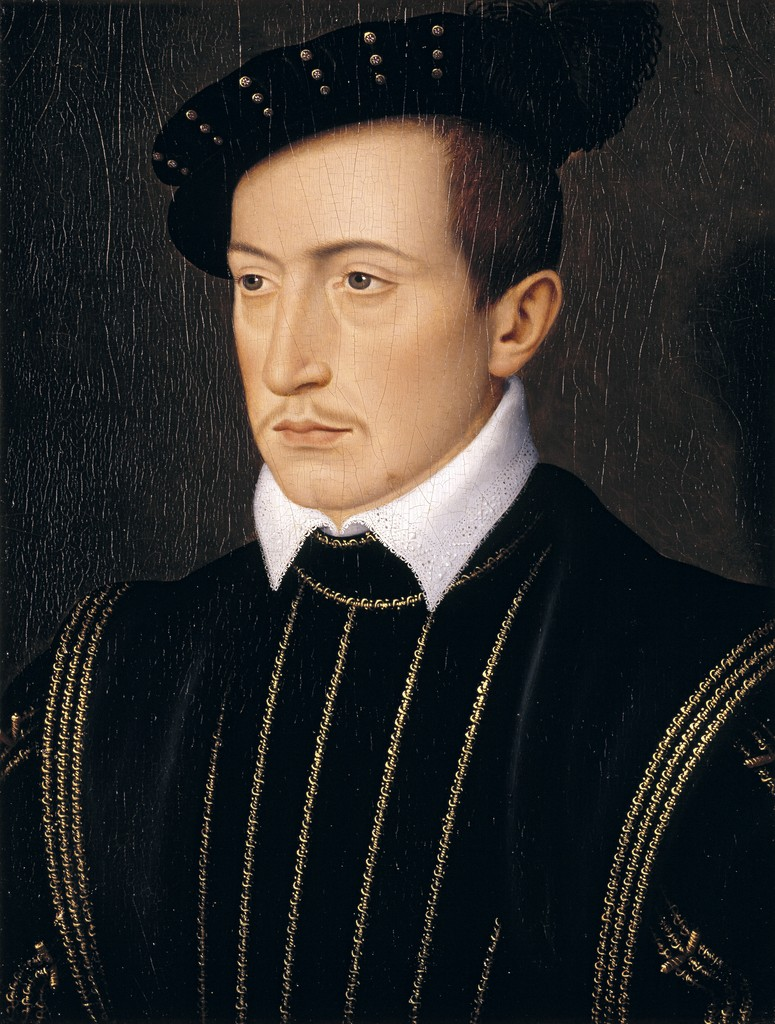
Guy XVII, count of Laval between 1531 and 1547. Portrait by François Clouet.

Guy XVII built a Renaissance gallery in extension to the castle around 1542. The gallery was later slightly redecorated in 1747. Guy XVII was a member of the Court of Francis I, one of the greatest kings of the French Renaissance. The House of Laval played a certain role in the development of the Renaissance arts in the region. Jean of Laval-Châteaubriant built for instance a large palace at the château de Châteaubriant, located in Brittany. On his side, Guy XIX became a Huguenot.

During the 17th century, Laval became very prosperous and the Counter-Reformation led to the foundation of many religious institutions. Large convents were opened, including Ursulines, Benedictines and Capuchins. All these convents were later sold and demolished during the French Revolution. During the 18th century, the town, which had kept its medieval appearance, started to expand. New faubourgs appeared, and the local aristocracy built there many elegant hôtels particuliers, particularly around the place de Hercé, which became the most fashionable area of Laval.

In the middle of the 18th century, Laval had around 18,000 inhabitants and 3,525 households. It was the second most populous town in Maine, after Le Mans. It enjoyed several institutions, such as a présidial, an office of the ferme générale, a local jurisdiction, a hospital, a gendarmery and a city hall. Laval was also at the head of a pays d'élection (fiscal region) encompassing 65 parishes in southern Maine. Because it was located close to the Breton border, Laval had a large salt storehouse, which controlled the collect of the gabelle, a tax on salt. Because Brittany was a large salt producer, it was exempted from gabelle, but people living in Maine, or other hinterland provinces, had to buy a certain amount of salt every year, thus paying the gabelle was compulsory for them. A salt storehouse such as the one in Laval was therefore a tax office and it had to deal with salt contraband. 26 fairs were held each year in the pays d'élection, and three markets were held in the town. At that time Laval was made up of three parishes.

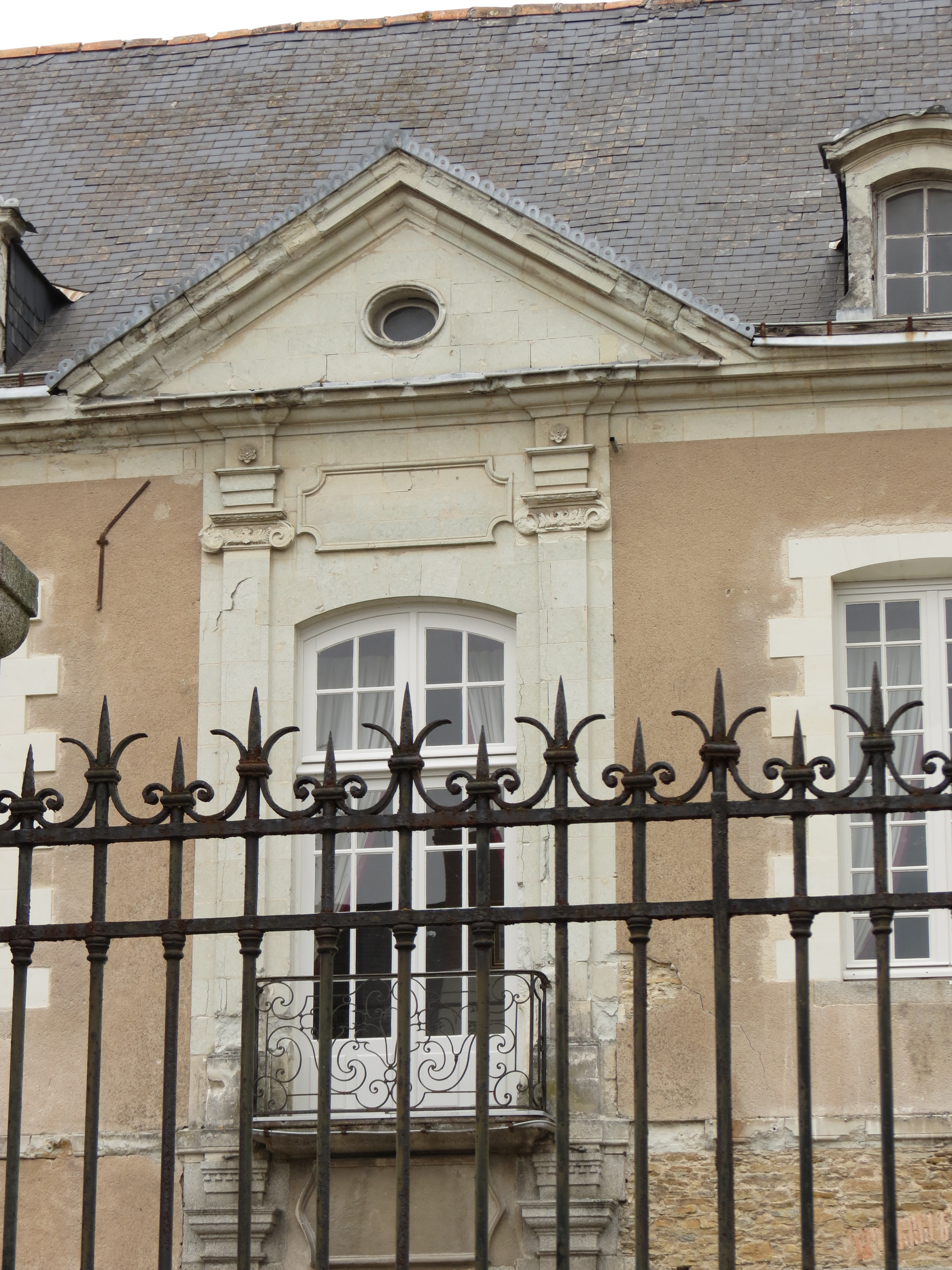
The hôtel d'Argentré is one of the numerous hôtels particuliers built in Laval during the 18th century.

The textile industry in Laval reached its zenith just before the French Revolution. The town had the right to produce eight sorts of cloth, including the royales and demi-Hollande, which were among the finest linen weaved in France. The neighbouring towns of Mayenne and Château-Gontier also had the right to produce linen, but in only three or four kinds of cloth.

The royales and demi-Hollande were the best linen of Laval, as well as the most expensive. A demi-Hollande could cost up to 700 pounds, and a toile forte, the cheapest one, had a worth of 50 pounds. The other sorts of linen made in Laval were also cheap and of a low quality, but they represented the largest share of the total production. The linen of Laval were sold mainly in France, but also abroad. The rustic non-battues were only made for the Spanish market, some of the best linen were sold in Portugal and the stronger clothes were exported to the French colonies in America. The royales and the demi-Hollande were usually sold in Troyes, Senlis and Beauvais, three towns located around Paris, which were renowned for their markets. Laval also produced a specific kind of linen, the pontivy, for the French army.

In the 18th century, the old medieval centre was still encircled by city walls, and its narrow plots and streets forbade any large urban transformation. However, the authorities planned to build a large thoroughfare bypassing the centre by the north. That involved the construction of a new bridge on the Mayenne river, because at that time Laval only had one, which was small and very old. The project was validated in 1758, but works did not start before 1804. The idea of a new axis was important not only for the town, but also for the whole region, because Laval was on the road between Paris and Brittany. Every traveler taking that road had to cross the Mayenne river on the old bridge, and to cross the insalubrious and narrow walled town.

The War in the Vendée, which opposed French revolutionaries and Royalist Catholics during the last decade of the 18th century, started in the département of Vendée, located south of the Loire, but it quickly spread in Brittany, Anjou and Maine, which were Catholic strongholds. Laval, which had been under the control of the revolutionaries since 1789, was seized by the Royalists 22 October 1793. The town was on their itinerary to the English Channel, where they were waiting for reinforcement. However, the expedition to Normandy was a total failure, and they were defeated there by the Republican army. The Royalists came back to Laval 25 December 1793, but they lost a siege in Angers and were definitely defeated in 1794.

=== Contemporary period ===
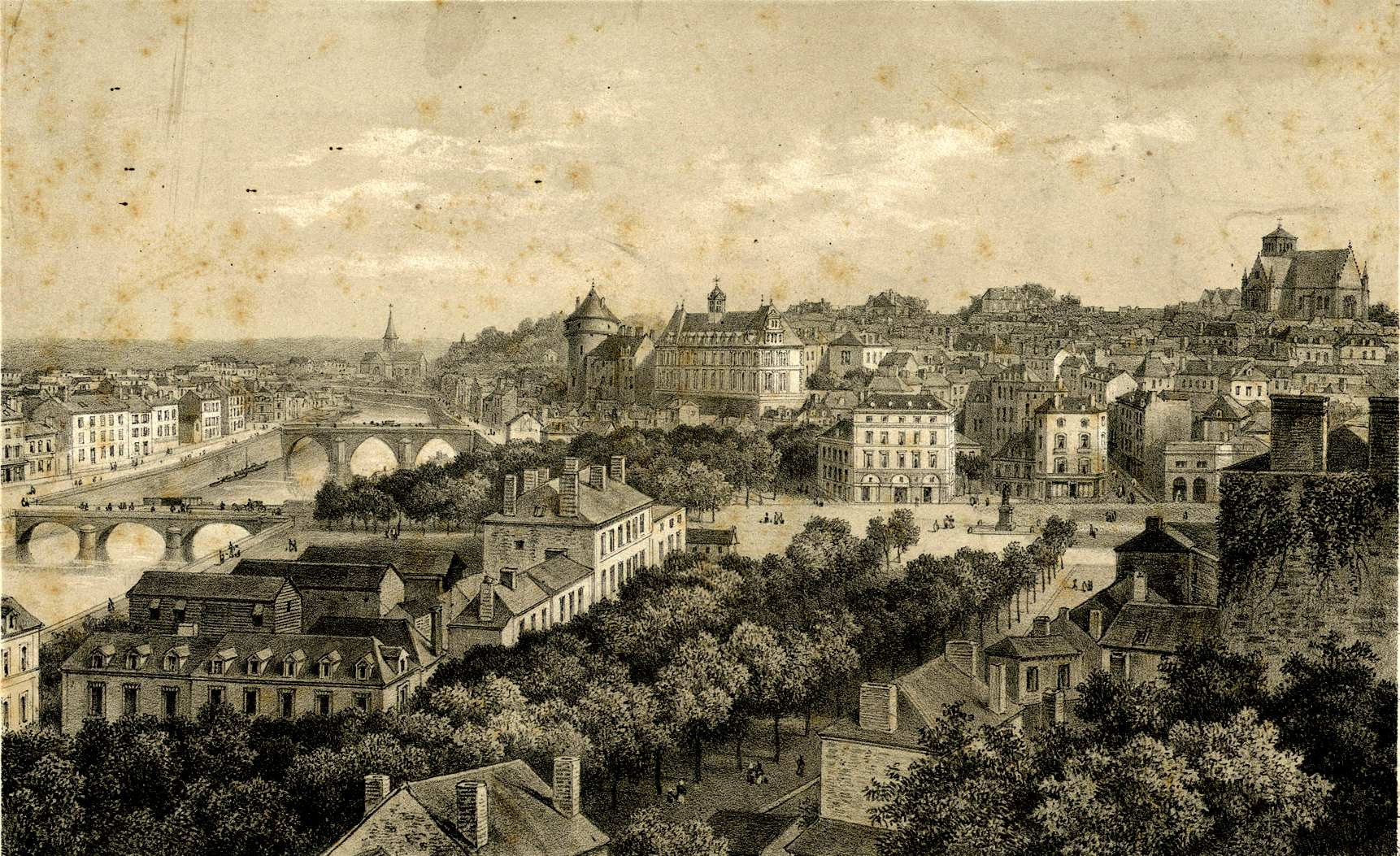
Laval as seen from the railway viaduct in the 19th century, with the place du 11-Novembre (then place de l'hôtel-de-ville), the Mayenne river, the bridges, the castle and the cathedral.

After the French Revolution, the local authorities decided to achieve the master plan planned in the 18th century. The new bridge was completed in 1824 and the new east–west axis, bypassing the old centre by the North, was developed during the 1820s and 1830s. A new town centre emerged on the axis, and a new square was built close to the bridge. Several official buildings were constructed around, including a new city hall, the préfecture and a theatre. Around the new bridge, the Mayenne river was deviated to form a straight waterway, and new quays were built between 1844 and 1863. After 1850, major works were carried in the medieval centre: several new streets were built and the square in front of the castle was enlarged. In 1855, Laval obtained a diocese and a railway station. That year, trains coming from Paris had their terminus in Laval, but the line was further extended towards Brittany in 1856.

Laval experienced a significant demographic growth throughout the 19th century. It had 15,000 inhabitants around 1800, and that figure rose to 21,293 in 1861. Two years later, the neighbouring communes of Avesnières and Grenoux were absorbed into Laval, together with parts of Changé. As a consequence of this amalgamation, Laval counted 27,000 inhabitants by 1863. In 1866, the town numbered 30,627 inhabitants, but then it experienced a slight decline which lasted until the end of the Second World War. This decline was due to both socio-economical and geopolitical factors:

- the decline of the textile industry: At the beginning of the 19th century, linen prices dropped, and the region stopped to produce flax. Instead, the factories in Laval imported cotton, but process costs were too high for the activity to be profitable.
- the invasions by Germany and ensuing costs caused by these invasions, both in terms reparations and the human misery.

At the beginning of the 20th century, Laval had several institutions, such as courts of justice, a chamber of commerce, a board of trade-arbitrators, a seminary and a secondary school for boys. The declining textile industry was still employing 10,000 hands in Laval and its suburbs. Other activities included metal-founding, flour-milling, tanning, dyeing, the making of boots and shoes, and the sawing of marble.

During the Second World War, Laval was occupied by Nazi Germany. The town was bombed several times by the Allies in June and July 1944. The train station and the surrounding area, as well as the viaduct and some streets in the centre were heavily damaged. General Patton's troops arrived in Laval 6 August 1944. The German occupiers did not surrender immediately, and they destroyed the bridges before leaving the town at around 3pm.

After the war, Laval experienced a quick industrialisation. Most of the old cloth factories were closed down and the town developed instead a large food processing sector, particularly dairies. It also developed plastics processing and car manufacturing. During that period, the town quickly expanded and several new institutions were built, such as a campus and a new hospital.

== Population ==
The population data in the table and graph below refer to the commune of Laval proper, in its geography at the given years. The commune of Laval absorbed the former communes of Notre-Dame-d'Avenières and Grenoux (partly) in 1863.

Historical population

Year	Pop.	±% p.a.
1793	14,822	—
1800	13,825	−0.99%
1806	15,167	+1.56%
1821	15,736	+0.25%
1831	16,401	+0.41%
1836	17,810	+1.66%
1841	17,348	−0.52%
1846	17,834	+0.55%
1851	19,218	+1.51%
1856	21,293	+2.07%
1861	22,892	+1.46%
1866	27,189	+3.50%
1872	26,343	−0.53%
1876	27,107	+0.72%
1881	29,889	+1.97%
1886	30,627	+0.49%
1891	30,374	−0.17%
1896	29,853	−0.35%
1901	30,356	+0.33%

Year	Pop.	±% p.a.
1906	29,751	−0.40%
1911	30,252	+0.33%
1921	27,464	−0.96%
1926	28,099	+0.46%
1931	27,792	−0.22%
1936	28,380	+0.42%
1946	32,544	+1.38%
1954	34,597	+0.77%
1962	39,283	+1.60%
1968	45,674	+2.54%
1975	51,544	+1.74%
1982	50,360	−0.33%
1990	50,473	+0.03%
1999	50,947	+0.10%
2007	50,613	−0.08%
2012	50,658	+0.02%
2017	49,728	−0.37%
2023	49,400	−0.11%

Source: EHESS and INSEE (1968-2023)

== Education ==
The city counts 27 primary schools (écoles primaires), 8 middle schools (collèges) and 7 high schools (lycées).

Some institutions also provide higher education in Laval like :

- ESTACA
- ESIEA (university)
- Le Mans University
- Catholic University of the West

== Economy ==
The town is historically a manufacturer of fine linens, but there are also foundries. Laval is also home to the Laval and Mayenne Technology Park, where firms working in electronics, computing and peripherals, food technology, veterinary pharmaceuticals, virtual reality, audiovisual productions, patents, marketing and a resource centre are all to be found in modern buildings.

It is also an important centre for the dairy industry and produces cheeses, ultra-high-temperature processing milk, and yoghurt. It is the headquarters of Lactalis.

There is a market in the town centre every Tuesday and Saturday, held near the former Palais de Justice.

== Transport ==
=== Railway ===
The Laval railway station offers regional connections with Le Mans, Rennes, Angers, and Nantes with TER Pays de la Loire and long range connections to the main cities of the country like Paris, Strasbourg or Lille with TGV.

=== Roads ===
The motorway A81 passes just in the north of Laval, linking the city to Paris and Brittany. Several other main roads cross in Laval which gives the city direct roads to Rennes, Le Mans, Angers, Tours and Nantes.

=== Public transport ===
The bus network operating in Laval is called TUL (Transports Urbains Lavallois). It is made of 17 urban lines for the city of Laval and its close suburb, including 4 which work from Monday to Sunday.

Laval also has a bicycle-sharing system called Vélitul.

== Administration ==
=== Cantons ===
Since the French canton reorganisation which came into effect in March 2015, the town of Laval is subdivided into three cantons:

- The canton of Laval-1 is composed of part of Laval (19,538 inhabitants in 2014);
- The canton of Laval-2 is composed of part of Laval (16,377 inhabitants);
- The canton of Laval-3 is composed of part of Laval (14,158 inhabitants).

=== Agglomeration ===
The urban area of Laval Agglomération covers 34 communes.

=== Mayors of Laval ===
- See list of mayors

The following are the most recent mayors.

- François d'Aubert (1995–2004) (left the mayoralty on entering the Ministry for Research)
- Roland Houdiard (2004–2005)
- François d'Aubert (2005–2008) (returned as mayor following a change of government)
- Guillaume Garot (2008–2012)
- Jean-Christophe Boyer (2012–2014)
- François Zocchetto (2014–2020)
- Florian Bercault (since 2020)

== Main sights ==
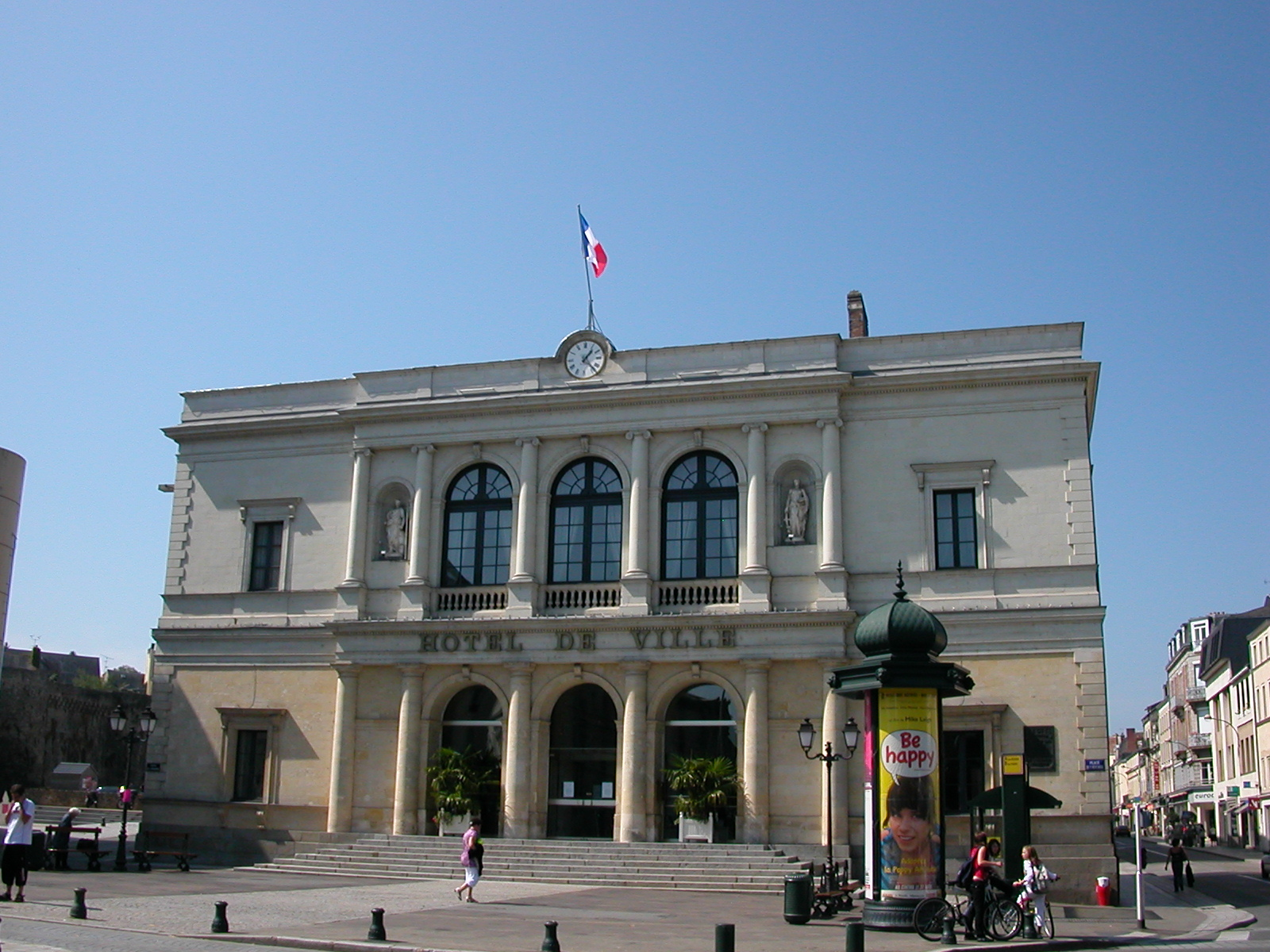
The Hôtel de Ville

- Medieval Château de Laval (tower and building)
- Significant remains of the town walls and of a town gate. The town came together around the foundation of the castle in 1020 in its position in the march, the border lands between France and Brittany. It was built for Guy I of Dénéré who became a vassal of the Count of Maine. at the end of the 12th century, local troubles combined with the town's position on the road into Brittany led the lord of Laval to build a great round keep which still has its original hoarding. At first the town was composed of scattered settlements such as the bourg cheverel and the bourg hersent. However, from the time of the new castle, it grew rapidly. It was enclosed in ramparts from the 13th century. There were five gates in the walls of which the sole one remaining is the porte Beucheresse or gate of the woodcutters.
- Cathedral of the Trinity (La Trinité). Pre-Romanesque and Romanesque characteristically, it has rich wall paintings and figurative stone carving but the general architectural style of the buildings is restrained. In Laval, that architectural sobriety was retained through the early Gothic period. The painting can be seen well in the calendars in Notre-Dame de Pritz, Saint-Martin, and Saint-Pierre-le-Potier. The architecture shows best at Grenoux, and Avesnières; while the stone carving is well displayed in the zoomorphic column capitals at Avesnières. The early Gothic, what in England would be called Early English but in Laval is Angevin Gothic, is to be seen in la Trinité. Here we are close to Anjou, the home of the Angevin kings of England beginning with Henry II. In the cathedral, on the effigy tomb of the bishop Louis Bougaud (1888), the following inscription may be read:

HEIC IN PACE QVIE SCIT
LUDOVICVS BOVGAVD EPISCOPUS VALLEGVIDONENSIS DECESSIT VII IDVS NOVEMB AN MDCCCLXXXVIII (1888)
ANNOS NATVS LXV.M.V.III.D.VII
VIVAS IN DEO

- The Jardin botanique de la Perrine, a botanical garden and park
- The Hôtel de Ville was completed in 1831.

== Arts ==
The town has obtained the label Ville d'Art et d'Histoire from the fact of its rich heritage.

As a response to the Douanier Rousseau's having been born in Laval, there is a biennial festival of naive art, the Biennale Internationale d'Art naïf de Laval. It seeks to explore the course of modern primitivism. Pictures are brought from all round Europe.

== Sport ==
Stade Lavallois is the local professional football side of Laval. The club competes in Ligue 2, the second division of French football, and plays its home matches at the Stade Francis Le Basser.

== Notable people ==
- Pierre-Emerick Aubameyang (born 1989), professional footballer
- Emmanuel Besnier (born 1970), billionaire
- Birds in Row, hardcore band
- Éric Boullier (born 1973), motorsport engineer
- Grégory Bourillon (born 1984), professional footballer
- Yann Clairay (born 1983), racing driver
- Francis Coquelin (born 1991), professional footballer
- Odile Decq (born 1955), architect
- René Diehl, archaeologist
- Alain Gerbault (1893–1941), sailor, writer, tennis champion
- Jean-Marie Guyau (1854–1888), writer and philosopher
- Maxime Guyon (born 1989), multiple French flat horse racing champion jockey
- Géo Ham (1900–1972), illustrator and designer
- Alfred Jarry (1873–1907), writer
- Anne Terrier Laffaille (1904–1971), composer
- Charles Landelle (1821–1908), painter
- Madeleine Laurain-Portemer (1917–1996), historian
- François de Laval (1623–1708), first bishop of Quebec
- Louis Lemercier de Neuville (1830–1918), dramatic author and puppeteer
- Thibault de Montalembert (born 1962), actor
- Prosper Mortou, musician
- Ambroise Paré, medical doctor considered one of the fathers of surgery and a pioneer in surgical techniques and battlefield medicine
- François Pyrard, sailor
- Henri Rousseau (1844–1910), known as le Douanier, painter
- Lucienne de Saint-Mart (1866–1958), French painter
- Daniel Tauvry (1669–1701), physician and anatomist
- Augustine Tuillerie (1833–1923), alias G.Bruno, writer

== International relations ==
Laval is twinned with:

- Boston, United Kingdom
- Modesto, United States
- Chalkidiki, Greece
- Gandia, Spain
- Garango, Burkina Faso
- Laval, Canada
- Mettmann, Germany
- Lovech, Bulgaria
- Suceava, Romania

== See also ==
- Mayenne
- Maine
- Pays de la Loire
