= Raoul du Gardier =

French painter

- Born: 1 April 1871; Wiesbaden, Germany
- Died: 17 October 1952 (aged 81); Pornic, France
- Occupation: Painter
- Honours: Official Painter of the French Air and Space Force

Raoul du Gardier (1 April 1871 – 17 October 1952) was a French painter. He was a student of Gustave Moreau at the École des Beaux-Arts, Paris in the 1890s. His work was part of the art competitions at the 1928 Summer Olympics and the 1932 Summer Olympics.
