= Cantons of Laval =

Coordinates: 48.07°N 0.77°W

The cantons of Laval are administrative divisions of the Mayenne department, in northwestern France. Since the French canton reorganisation which came into effect in March 2015, the city of Laval is subdivided into 3 cantons. Their seat is in Laval.

== Population ==
Name	Population (2019)	Cantonal Code
Canton of Laval-1	19,317	5310
Canton of Laval-2	16,279	5311
Canton of Laval-3	14,137	5312
