= Prosper Mortou =

French musician and painter

Prosper Mortou (1482–1566) was a French musician and painter.
