= François d'Aubert =

French politician

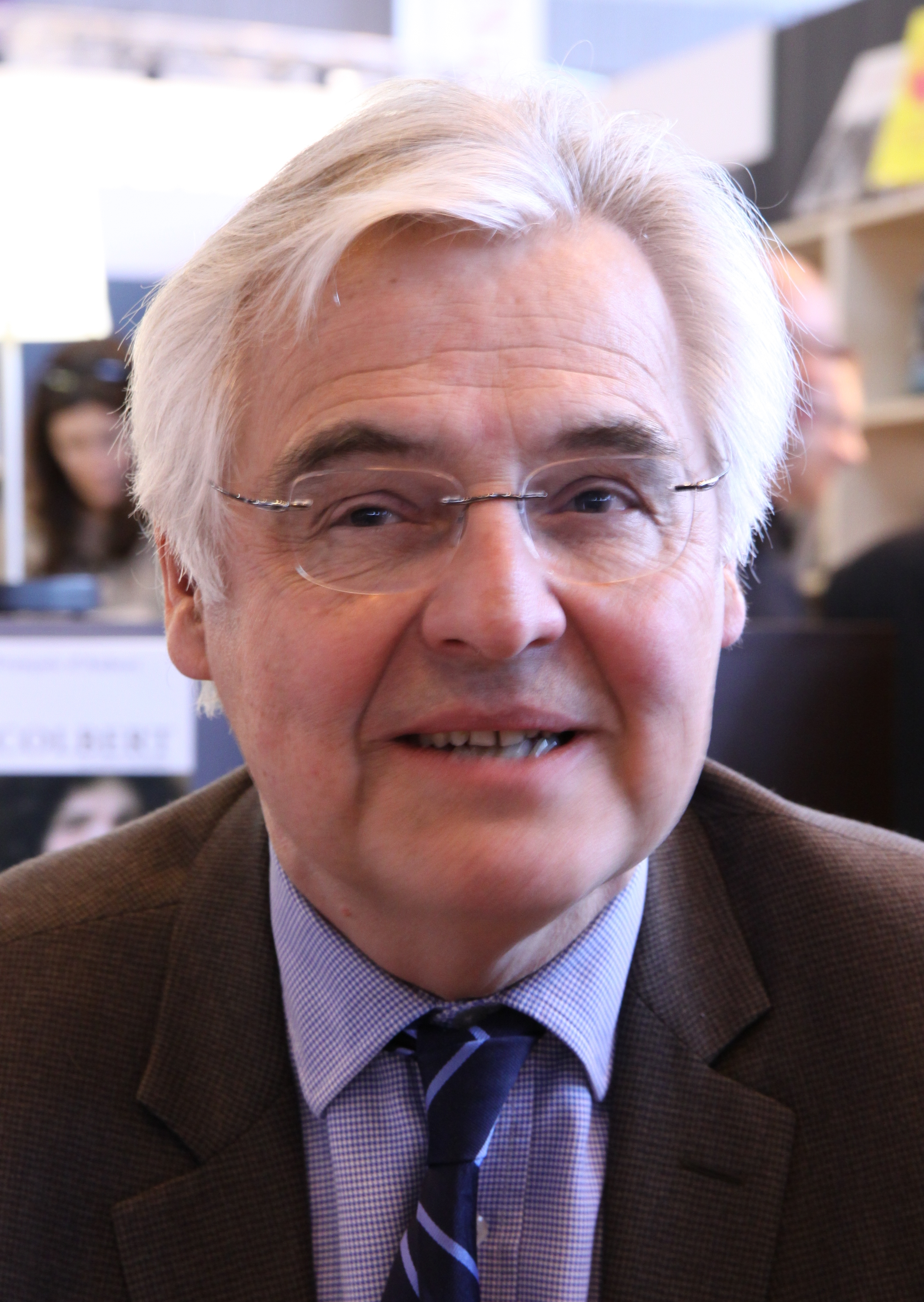

French Minister of Research
- In office 2004–2005
- President: Jacques Chirac
- Prime Minister: Jean-Pierre Raffarin
- Preceded by: Claudie Haigneré
- Succeeded by: François Goulard

Mayor of Laval
- In office 1995–2008
- Preceded by: Yves Patoux
- Succeeded by: Guillaume Garot

Personal details
- Born: 31 October 1943 (age 82) Boulogne-Billancourt, France
- Party: The Republicans
- Education: Lycée Louis-le-Grand
- Alma mater: HEC Paris; Sciences Po, ÉNA

François d'Aubert (born 31 October 1943, in Boulogne-Billancourt) is a French politician.

He is an auditor at the Court of Audit. From 2002, he was minister delegate to research in Jean-Pierre Raffarin's government.

From 26 July 2007 to 16 April 2009, he was president of the Cité des Sciences et de l'Industrie.

François d'Aubert is a graduate of HEC Paris, Sciences Po and ENA.
