= Nodozana =

Scientific classification
- Domain: Eukaryota
- Kingdom: Animalia
- Phylum: Arthropoda
- Class: Insecta
- Order: Lepidoptera
- Superfamily: Noctuoidea
- Family: Erebidae
- Subfamily: Arctiinae
- Tribe: Lithosiini
- Genus: Nodozana; H. Druce, 1899

Genus of moths

Nodozana is a genus of moths in the subfamily Arctiinae erected by Herbert Druce in 1899.

== Species ==
- Nodozana albula Dyar, 1914
- Nodozana bellicula Schaus, 1905
- Nodozana bifasciata Rothschild, 1913
- Nodozana boliviana Rothschild, 1913
- Nodozana boudinoti Gibeaux, 1983
- Nodozana catocaloides Gibeaux, 1983
- Nodozana cocciniceps Dognin, 1912
- Nodozana endoxantha E. D. Jones, 1908
- Nodozana fifina Dognin, 1913
- Nodozana fifi Dognin, 1891
- Nodozana heieroglyphica Rothschild, 1913
- Nodozana jucunda E. D. Jones, 1914
- Nodozana picturata Schaus, 1911
- Nodozana pyrophora Hampson, 1911
- Nodozana rhodosticta Butler, 1878
- Nodozana roseofuliginosa Rothschild, 1913
- Nodozana subandroconiata Rothschild, 1916
- Nodozana thricophora H. Druce, 1885
- Nodozana toulgoeti Gibeaux, 1983
- Nodozana xanthomela H. Druce, 1899

== Former species ==
- Nodozana angustata Gibeaux, 1983
- Nodozana aurobrunnea Gibeaux, 1983
- Nodozana granvillei Gibeaux, 1983
- Nodozana griseovariegata Gibeaux, 1983
