= Mayenne (river) =

River in western France

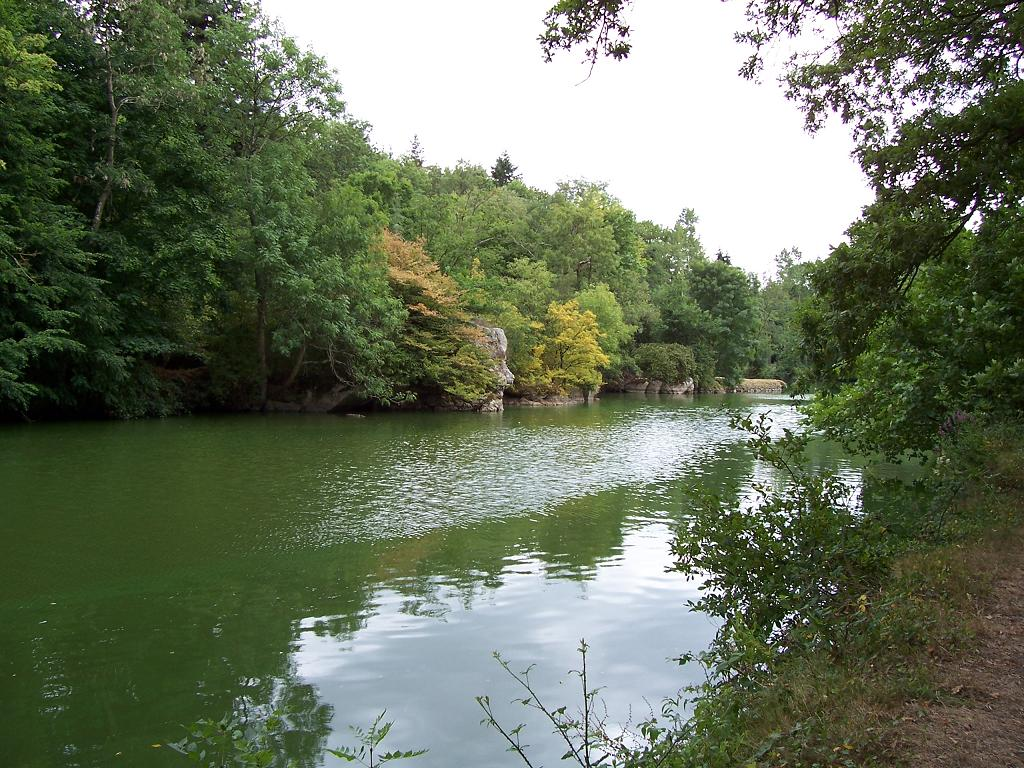
- The Mayenne and Sainte-Apollonie Island near Entrammes

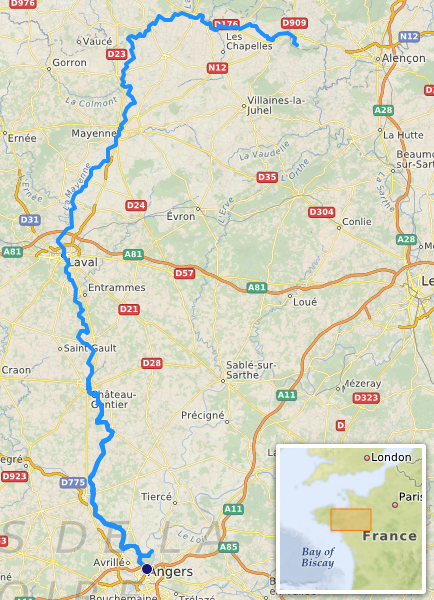
- Native name: La Mayenne (French)

Location
- Country: France

Physical characteristics
- Source
  - location: Perche
  - elevation: 300 m (980 ft)
- Mouth
  - location: Maine
  - coordinates: 47°29′35″N 0°32′34″W
- Length: 202.3 km (125.7 mi)
- Basin size: 5,820 km^{2} (2,250 sq mi)
- Discharge
  - average: 50 m^{3}/s (1,800 cu ft/s)

Basin features
- Progression: Maine→ Loire→ Atlantic Ocean

The Mayenne (French pronunciation: [majɛn]) is a 202.3 km (125.7 mi) long river in western France, principally located in the French region of Pays de la Loire. Together with the river Sarthe and its tributary the Loir it forms the Maine, which is a tributary to the Loire.

== Geography ==
Its source is in the department of Orne near the commune of Lalacelle, between Pré-en-Pail and Alençon. The source is in the foothills of Mont des Avaloirs at an altitude of 961 feet (293m); from there the river runs from east to west until it reaches Sept-Forges, at which point it turns to the south. After being joined by the Oudon, the Mayenne forms a confluence with the Sarthe north of Angers. The confluence of these two rivers is called the Maine, which is the local pronunciation of Mayenne. The waters of the Maine then empty into the Loire south of Angers.

Departments and towns along the river include:

- Orne
- Mayenne: Mayenne, Laval, Château-Gontier
- Maine-et-Loire: Chenillé-Changé, Chambellay, Montreuil-sur-Maine, Le Lion-d'Angers, Grez-Neuville, Pruillé, La Membrolle-sur-Longuenée, Feneu, Montreuil-Juigné, Cantenay-Epinard, Angers.

It is featured prominently in the video game Call of Duty 3.

== Navigation ==
The Mayenne was navigable in its natural state up to Château-Gontier. Works were undertaken in the 16th century to make the river navigable upstream from here to Laval; royal decrees by François I in 1536 and 1537 authorised the necessary works, including flash locks. Economic expansion in the 17th and 18th centuries justified engineering with locks and weirs not only to Laval but also upstream to Mayenne. This extension, with 20 locks and weirs, was built at the same time as about 40 flash locks were replaced by 25 weirs and locks, some in short lock-cuts, between 1853 et 1878. The river was used by barges carrying up to 130 tonnes, and the principal traffics were construction materials (wood and stone), coal from the mines of L'Huisserie, grain, fruit and vegetables. At this time it was planned to build a watershed canal north from Mayenne to the tidal river Orne at Caen, but the project was abandoned as railways became the preferred carrier of freight. The navigation was abandoned after World War II, but restored from the 1970s as a cruising waterway. The upstream section was completed in the early 1990s.

== Flow ==
In spite of abundant precipitation, the flow of the Mayenne is irregular because of the impermeability of the sandstone, granite, and schist which form its drainage basin. Thus, for an average flow of 39 m^{3}/s (1,400 cu ft/s) before the Mayenne's confluence with the Oudon, the yearly minimum flow can range from very low (4 m^{3}/s (140 cu ft/s) at Laval) to very high (flash floods with flows of 200 m^{3}/s (7,100 cu ft/s) at Laval and more than 800 m^{3}/s (28,000 cu ft/s) at Chambellay).

The flow of the Mayenne has been observed for a period of 44 years (1965–2008) at Chambellay, situated upstream of the confluence with the Sarthe, and just upstream from where the Oudon joins the Mayenne. At this location, the drainage basin of the river is 4,160 km^{2} (1,610 sq mi) out of a total of 5,820 km^{2} (2,250 sq mi), which is less than three-quarters of the entire drainage basin (71.5%), and also does not include the flow of the Oudon, the Mayenne's principal tributary.

The average yearly flow at Chambellay is 39.3 m^{3}/s (1,390 cu ft/s), which corresponds to over 50 m^{3}/s (1,800 cu ft/s) if the rest of the drainage basin were included.

=== Tributaries ===
The main tributaries of the Mayenne are, from source to mouth:

- Varenne
- Colmont
- Ernée
- Jouanne
- Vicoin
- Oudon
- Ouette

== External sources ==
- River Mayenne (River Maine) and River Oudon, with maps and details of places, ports and moorings, by the author of Inland Waterways of France, Imray
- Navigation details for 80 French rivers and canals (French waterways website section)
