= Antiphrastis galenopa =

Scientific classification
- Domain: Eukaryota
- Kingdom: Animalia
- Phylum: Arthropoda
- Class: Insecta
- Order: Lepidoptera
- Family: Tortricidae
- Genus: Antiphrastis
- Species: A. galenopa

Binomial name
- Antiphrastis galenopa Meyrick, in de Joannis, 1930

Species of moth

Antiphrastis galenopa is a species of moth of the family Tortricidae. The status of this species is unclear.
