= Locastra bryalis =

Scientific classification
- Kingdom: Animalia
- Phylum: Arthropoda
- Class: Insecta
- Order: Lepidoptera
- Family: Pyralidae
- Genus: Locastra
- Species: L. bryalis

Binomial name
- Locastra bryalis de Joannis, 1930

Species of moth

Locastra bryalis is a species of snout moth in the genus Locastra. It was described by Joseph de Joannis in 1930 and is known from Vietnam.
