= Chiraps excurvata =

Scientific classification
- Domain: Eukaryota
- Kingdom: Animalia
- Phylum: Arthropoda
- Class: Insecta
- Order: Lepidoptera
- Family: Tortricidae
- Genus: Chiraps
- Species: C. excurvata

Binomial name
- Chiraps excurvata (Meyrick, in de Joannis, 1930)

Synonyms
- Cacoecia excurvata Meyrick, in de Joannis, 1930; Cacoecia chlorotypa Meyrick in Caradja & Meyrick, 1934

Species of moth

Chiraps excurvata is a species of moth of the family Tortricidae. It is found in Vietnam and Liaoning, China.
