= Le Plessis-Macé =

- Part of Longuenée-en-Anjou
- Location of Le Plessis-Macé
- Location within France Location within Pays de la Loire
- Coordinates: 47°32′35″N 0°40′19″W
- Country: France
- Region: Pays de la Loire
- Department: Maine-et-Loire
- Arrondissement: Angers
- Canton: Angers-4
- Commune: Longuenée-en-Anjou
- Area^{1}: 7.99 km^{2} (3.08 sq mi)
- Highest elevation: 96 m (315 ft)
- Lowest elevation: 21 m (69 ft)
- Population (2022): 1,176
  - Density: 147/km^{2} (381/sq mi)
- Demonym(s): Plessis-Macéen, Plessis-Macéenne
- Time zone: UTC+01:00 (CET)
  - Summer (DST): UTC+02:00 (CEST)
- Postal code: 49770
- ^{1} French Land Register data, which excludes lakes, ponds, glaciers > 1 km^{2} (0.386 sq mi or 247 acres) and river estuaries.

Le Plessis-Macé (French pronunciation: [lə plɛsi mase]) is a former commune in the Maine-et-Loire department in western France. On 1 January 2016, it was merged into the new commune of Longuenée-en-Anjou.

== See also ==
- Communes of the Maine-et-Loire department
