= Ouette (river) =

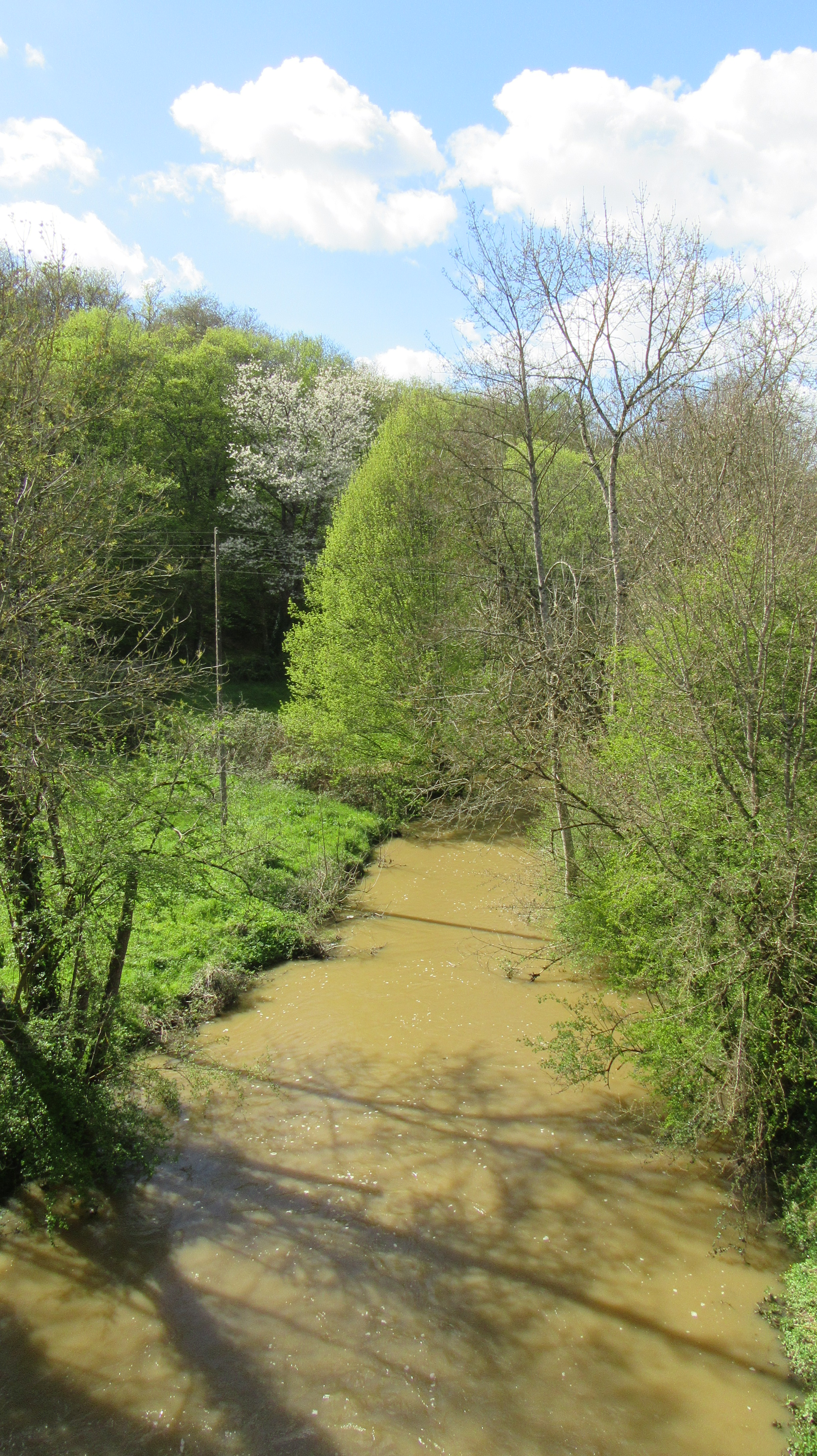
- The Ouette near Entrammes

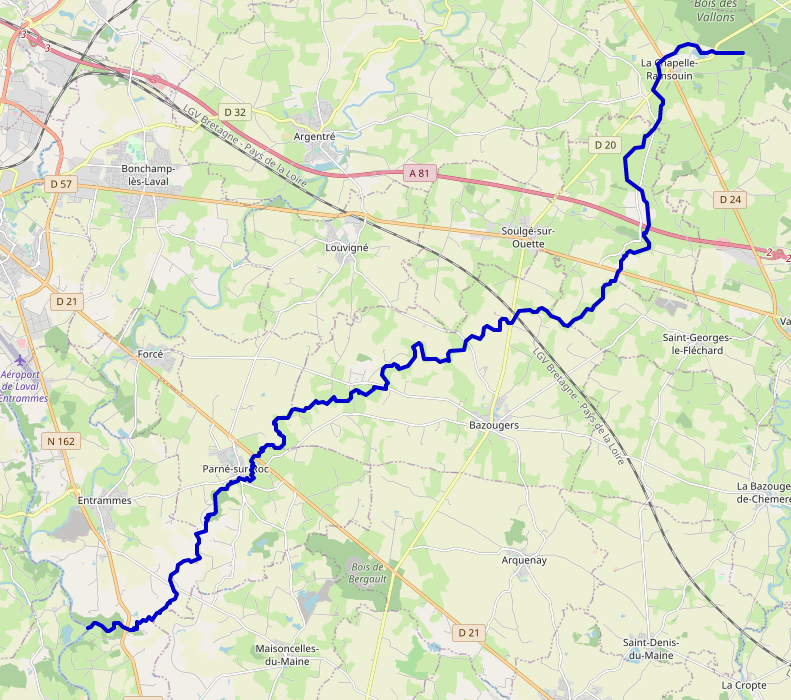
- Native name: L'Ouette (French)

Location
- Country: France

Physical characteristics
- Source
  - location: La Chapelle-Rainsouin
- Mouth
  - location: Mayenne
  - coordinates: 47°58′13″N 0°43′12″W

Basin features
- Progression: Mayenne→ Maine→ Loire→ Atlantic Ocean

The Ouette (French pronunciation: [wɛt]) is a 35 km (22 mi) long river in western France located in the department of Mayenne, region of Pays de la Loire. It is a tributary of the river Mayenne on the left side, and so is a sub-tributary of the Loire by Mayenne and Maine.

== History ==
The name of Ouette probably goes back to the Latin or Celtic form Oue which would be a contraction of Ovica, that is small sheep.

== Gallery ==
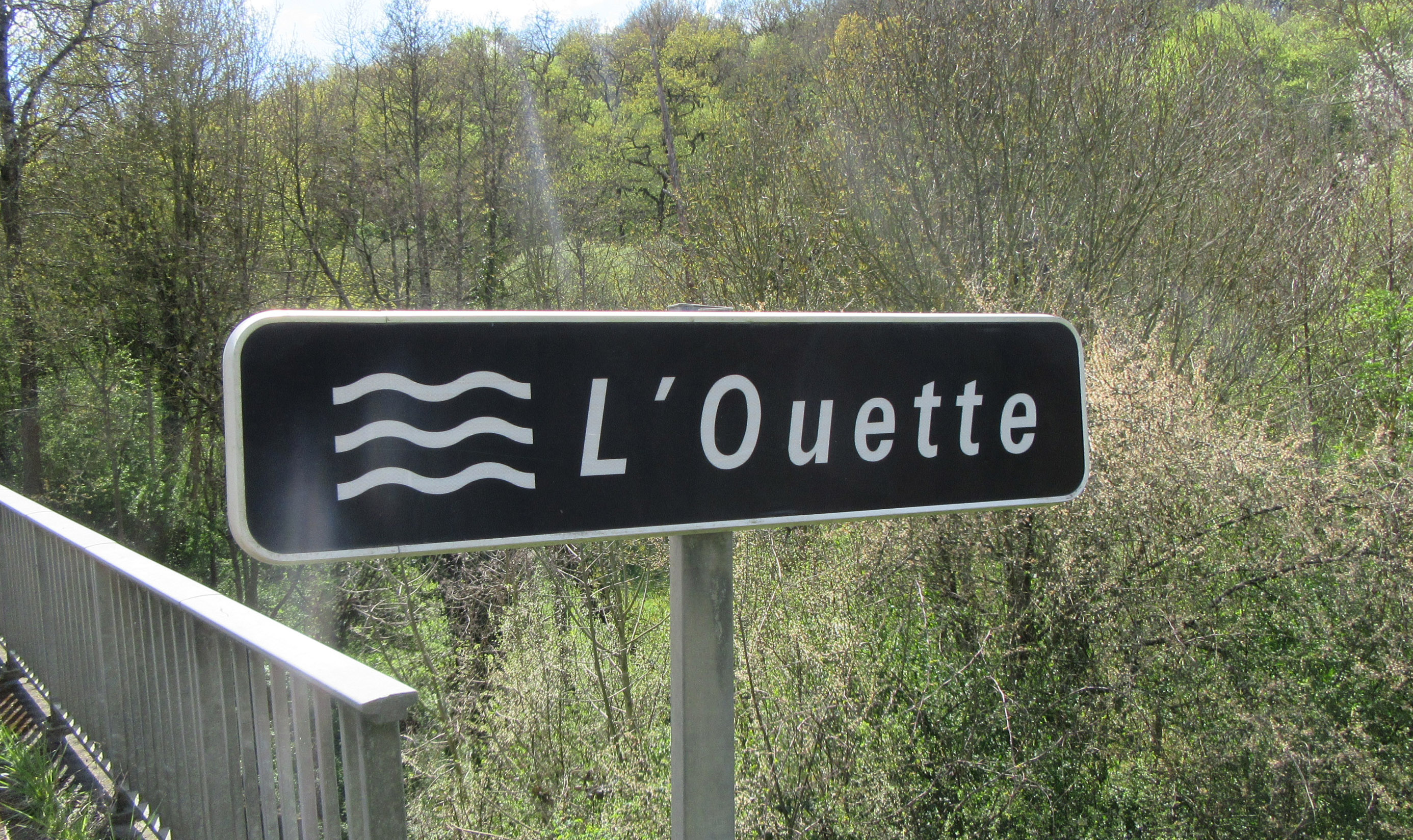

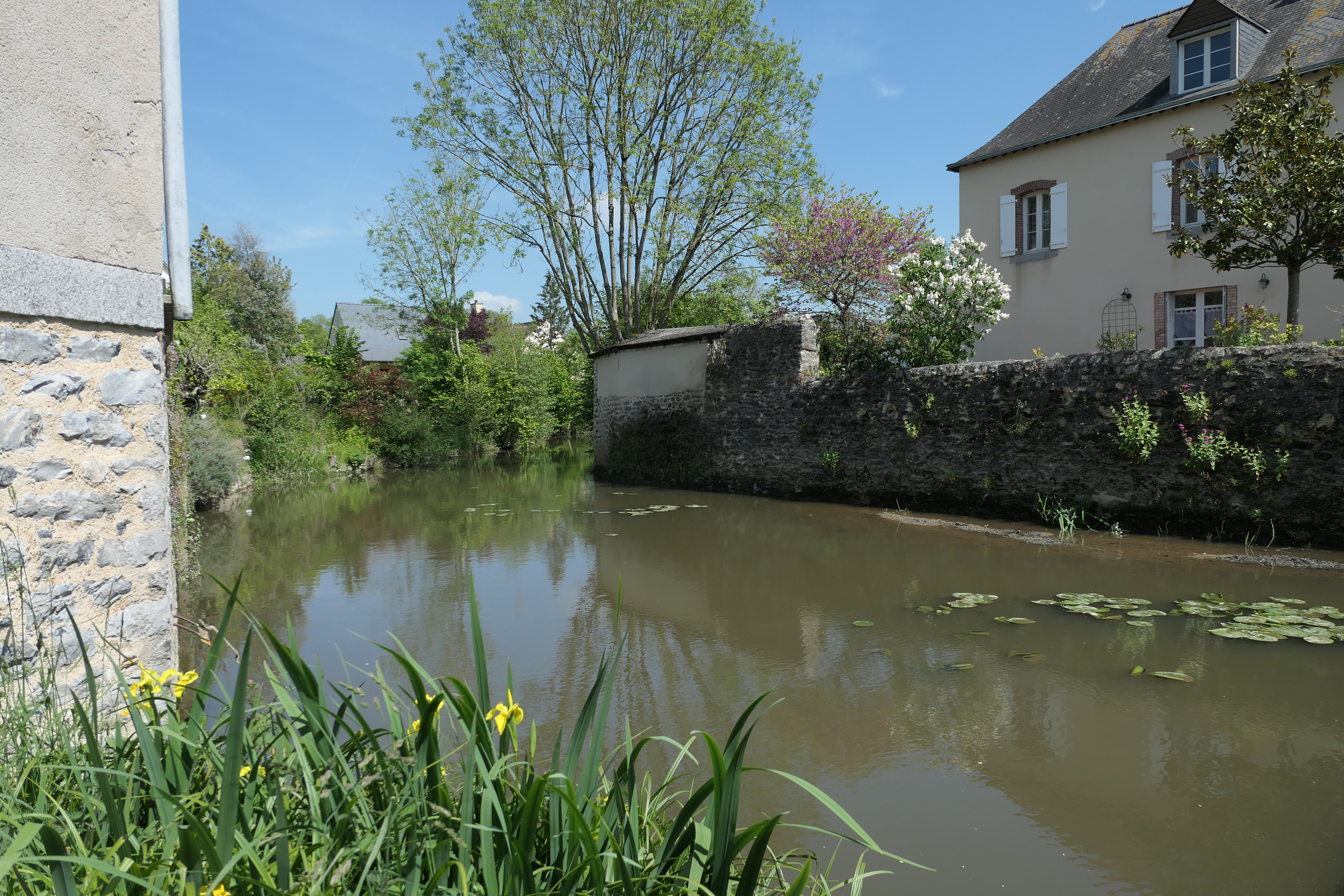
The Ouette in Parné-sur-Roc.

== See also ==
- Port-du-Salut Abbey
