= Neasura pellucida =

Scientific classification
- Kingdom: Animalia
- Phylum: Arthropoda
- Class: Insecta
- Order: Lepidoptera
- Superfamily: Noctuoidea
- Family: Erebidae
- Subfamily: Arctiinae
- Genus: Neasura
- Species: N. pellucida

Binomial name
- Neasura pellucida de Joannis, 1928

Synonyms
- Neasura pellucida var. punctigera de Joannis, 1928

Species of moth

Neasura pellucida is a moth of the subfamily Arctiinae. It was described by Joseph de Joannis in 1928. It is found in Vietnam.
