= Montreuil-sur-Maine =

- Commune
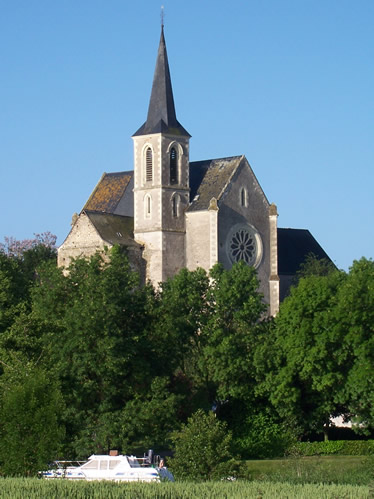
- The church in Montreuil-sur-Maine
- Location of Montreuil-sur-Maine
- Location within France Location within Pays de la Loire
- Coordinates: 47°39′04″N 0°41′44″W
- Country: France
- Region: Pays de la Loire
- Department: Maine-et-Loire
- Arrondissement: Segré
- Canton: Tiercé
- Intercommunality: Vallées du Haut-Anjou

Government
  - Mayor (2023–2026): Vincent Vignais
- Area^{1}: 11.13 km^{2} (4.30 sq mi)
- Elevation: 53 m (174 ft)
- Highest elevation: 61 m (200 ft)
- Lowest elevation: 17 m (56 ft)
- Population (2023): 804
  - Density: 72.2/km^{2} (187/sq mi)
- Demonym(s): Montreuillais, Montreuillaise
- Time zone: UTC+01:00 (CET)
  - Summer (DST): UTC+02:00 (CEST)
- INSEE/Postal code: 49217 /49220
- ^{1} French Land Register data, which excludes lakes, ponds, glaciers > 1 km^{2} (0.386 sq mi or 247 acres) and river estuaries.

Montreuil-sur-Maine (French pronunciation: [mɔ̃tʁœj syʁ mɛn], literally Montreuil on Maine) is a commune in the Maine-et-Loire department in western France.

== Geography ==
The Oudon forms the commune's south-western border. The Mayenne flows south through the middle of the commune.

== See also ==
- Communes of the Maine-et-Loire department
