= Lycomorphodes calopteridion =

Scientific classification
- Kingdom: Animalia
- Phylum: Arthropoda
- Class: Insecta
- Order: Lepidoptera
- Superfamily: Noctuoidea
- Family: Erebidae
- Subfamily: Arctiinae
- Genus: Lycomorphodes
- Species: L. calopteridion

Binomial name
- Lycomorphodes calopteridion de Joannis, 1904

Species of moth

Lycomorphodes calopteridion is a species of butterfly in the family Erebidae. It was first described by Joseph de Joannis in 1904. It is found in Brazil.
