= Locastra ardua =

Scientific classification
- Kingdom: Animalia
- Phylum: Arthropoda
- Class: Insecta
- Order: Lepidoptera
- Family: Pyralidae
- Genus: Locastra
- Species: L. ardua

Binomial name
- Locastra ardua C. Swinhoe, 1902

Synonyms
- Locastra drucei Bethune-Baker, 1905

Species of moth

Locastra ardua is a species of snout moth in the genus Locastra. It was described by Charles Swinhoe in 1902, and is known from Fiji, including Nausori.
