= Chiraps phaedra =

Scientific classification
- Domain: Eukaryota
- Kingdom: Animalia
- Phylum: Arthropoda
- Class: Insecta
- Order: Lepidoptera
- Family: Tortricidae
- Genus: Chiraps
- Species: C. phaedra

Binomial name
- Chiraps phaedra (Diakonoff, 1983)

Synonyms
- Cacoecia phaedra Diakonoff, 1983

Species of moth

Chiraps phaedra is a species of moth of the family Tortricidae. It is found on Sumatra in western Indonesia.
