= Lycomorphodes aracia =

Scientific classification
- Domain: Eukaryota
- Kingdom: Animalia
- Phylum: Arthropoda
- Class: Insecta
- Order: Lepidoptera
- Superfamily: Noctuoidea
- Family: Erebidae
- Subfamily: Arctiinae
- Genus: Lycomorphodes
- Species: L. aracia

Binomial name
- Lycomorphodes aracia E. D. Jones, 1914

Species of moth

Lycomorphodes aracia is a moth of the family Erebidae. It was described by E. Dukinfield Jones in 1914. It is found in São Paulo, Brazil.
