= Lycomorphodes suspecta =

Scientific classification
- Domain: Eukaryota
- Kingdom: Animalia
- Phylum: Arthropoda
- Class: Insecta
- Order: Lepidoptera
- Superfamily: Noctuoidea
- Family: Erebidae
- Subfamily: Arctiinae
- Genus: Lycomorphodes
- Species: L. suspecta

Binomial name
- Lycomorphodes suspecta (Felder, 1875)

Synonyms
- Cisthene suspecta Felder, 1875

Species of moth

Lycomorphodes suspecta is a moth of the family Erebidae. It was described by Felder in 1875. It is found in the Brazilian states of Espírito Santo and São Paulo.
