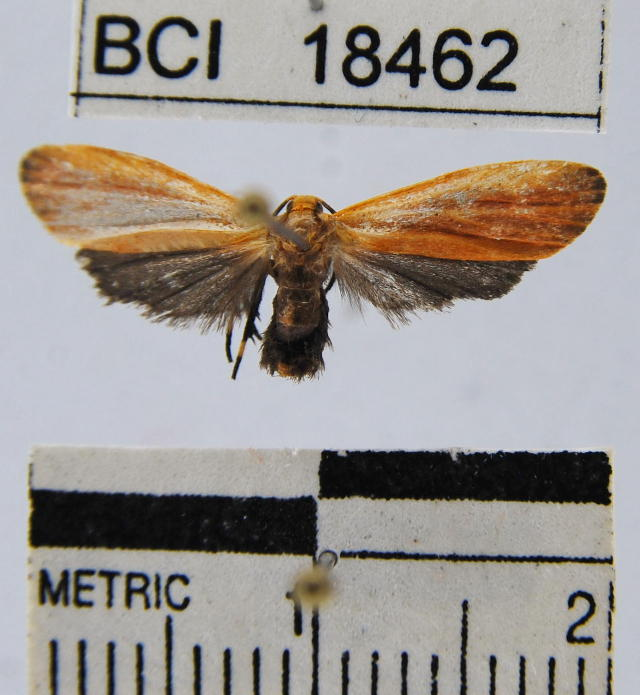

Scientific classification
- Domain: Eukaryota
- Kingdom: Animalia
- Phylum: Arthropoda
- Class: Insecta
- Order: Lepidoptera
- Superfamily: Noctuoidea
- Family: Erebidae
- Subfamily: Arctiinae
- Genus: Lycomorphodes
- Species: L. sordida

Binomial name
- Lycomorphodes sordida (Butler, 1877)

Synonyms
- Leptidule sordida Butler, 1877

= Lycomorphodes sordida =

Species of moth

Lycomorphodes sordida is a moth of the family Erebidae. It was described by Arthur Gardiner Butler in 1877. It is found in the United States from southern Texas and southern California through Mexico, Guatemala, Costa Rica and Panama to Colombia.

The wingspan is 19–21 mm.
