= Nodozana albula =

Scientific classification
- Domain: Eukaryota
- Kingdom: Animalia
- Phylum: Arthropoda
- Class: Insecta
- Order: Lepidoptera
- Superfamily: Noctuoidea
- Family: Erebidae
- Subfamily: Arctiinae
- Genus: Nodozana
- Species: N. albula

Binomial name
- Nodozana albula Dyar, 1914

Species of moth

Nodozana albula is a moth of the subfamily Arctiinae. It was described by Harrison Gray Dyar Jr. in 1914. It is found in Panama.
