= Lycomorphodes flavipars =

Scientific classification
- Kingdom: Animalia
- Phylum: Arthropoda
- Class: Insecta
- Order: Lepidoptera
- Superfamily: Noctuoidea
- Family: Erebidae
- Subfamily: Arctiinae
- Genus: Lycomorphodes
- Species: L. flavipars

Binomial name
- Lycomorphodes flavipars Hampson, 1909

Synonyms
- Lycomorphodes flavipars ab. nigripyga Strand, 1922; Lycomorphodes flavipars ab. reducta Draudt, 1918

Species of moth

Lycomorphodes flavipars is a moth of the family Erebidae. It was described by George Hampson in 1909. It is found in Colombia.
