= Neasura apicalis =

Scientific classification
- Kingdom: Animalia
- Phylum: Arthropoda
- Class: Insecta
- Order: Lepidoptera
- Superfamily: Noctuoidea
- Family: Erebidae
- Subfamily: Arctiinae
- Genus: Neasura
- Species: N. apicalis

Binomial name
- Neasura apicalis (Walker, 1854)

Synonyms
- Setina apicalis Walker, 1854; Setina bipunctata Walker, 1859

Species of moth

Neasura apicalis is a moth of the subfamily Arctiinae. It was described by Francis Walker in 1854. It is found in Singapore.
