= Lycomorphodes splendida =

Scientific classification
- Domain: Eukaryota
- Kingdom: Animalia
- Phylum: Arthropoda
- Class: Insecta
- Order: Lepidoptera
- Superfamily: Noctuoidea
- Family: Erebidae
- Subfamily: Arctiinae
- Genus: Lycomorphodes
- Species: L. splendida

Binomial name
- Lycomorphodes splendida Draudt, 1918

Species of moth

Lycomorphodes splendida is a moth of the family Erebidae. It was described by Max Wilhelm Karl Draudt in 1918. It is found in Colombia.
