= Longuenée-en-Anjou =

- Commune
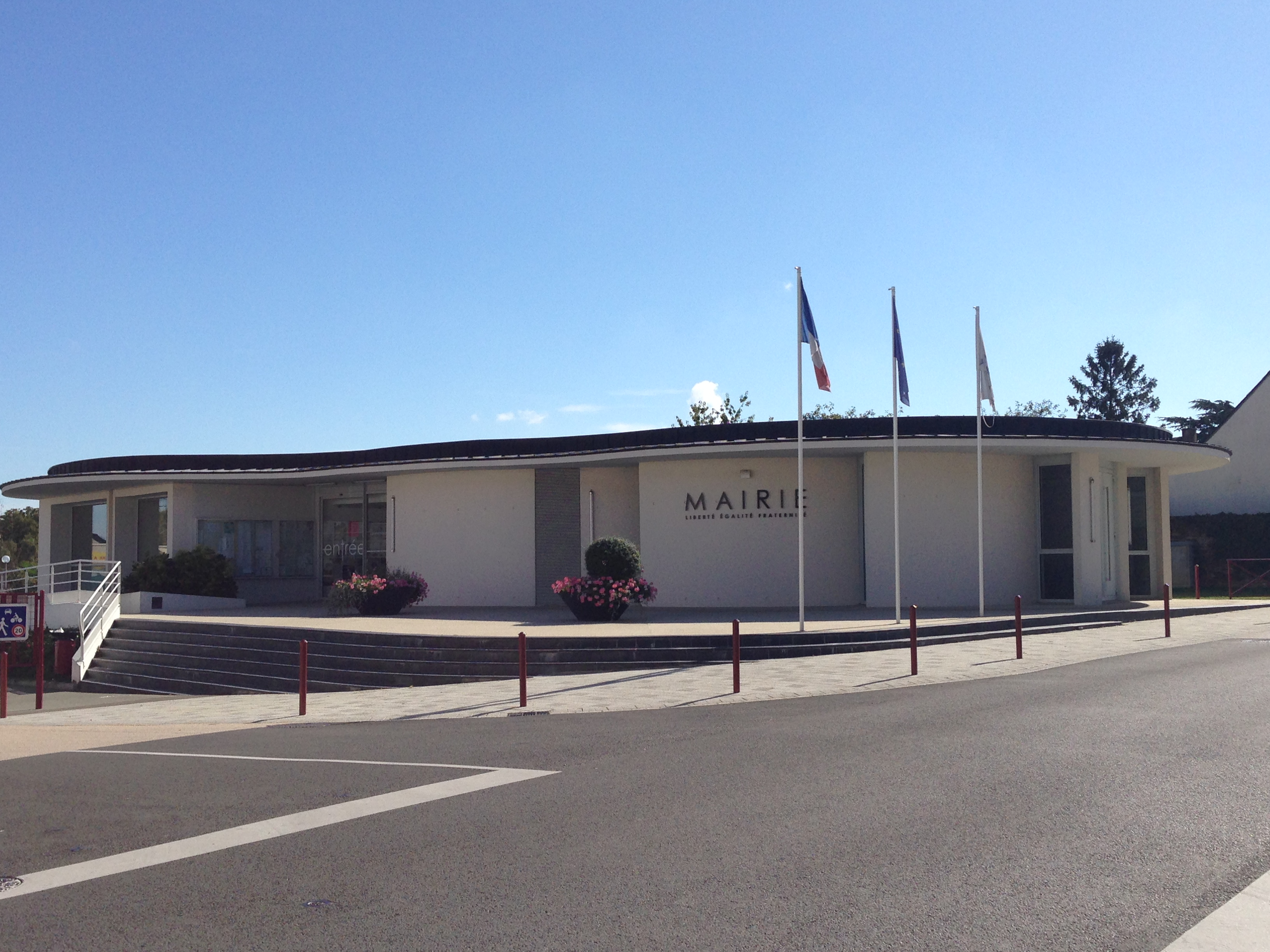
- The town hall in Longuenée
- Location of Longuenée-en-Anjou
- Location within France Location within Pays de la Loire
- Coordinates: 47°33′36″N 0°40′19″W
- Country: France
- Region: Pays de la Loire
- Department: Maine-et-Loire
- Arrondissement: Angers
- Canton: Angers-4, Tiercé
- Intercommunality: CU Angers Loire Métropole

Government
  - Mayor (2020–2026): Jean-Pierre Hébé
- Area^{1}: 53.50 km^{2} (20.66 sq mi)
- Population (2023): 6,571
  - Density: 122.8/km^{2} (318.1/sq mi)
- Demonym(s): Longuenéen (masculine), Longuenéenne (feminine)
- Time zone: UTC+01:00 (CET)
  - Summer (DST): UTC+02:00 (CEST)
- INSEE/Postal code: 49200 /49770
- ^{1} French Land Register data, which excludes lakes, ponds, glaciers > 1 km^{2} (0.386 sq mi or 247 acres) and river estuaries.

Longuenée-en-Anjou (French pronunciation: [lɔ̃ɡne ɑ̃.n‿ɑ̃ʒu], literally Longuenée in Anjou) is a commune in the department of Maine-et-Loire, Pays de la Loire, western France. The municipality was established on 1 January 2016 and consists of the former communes of La Membrolle-sur-Longuenée, La Meignanne, Le Plessis-Macé and Pruillé.

== Population ==
The population data given in the table below refer to the commune in its geography as of January 2025.

Historical population
Year	Pop.	±% p.a.
1968	1,974	—
1975	2,211	+1.63%
1982	3,351	+6.12%
1990	4,176	+2.79%
1999	4,988	+1.99%
2007	5,588	+1.43%
2012	6,136	+1.89%
2017	6,331	+0.63%
2023	6,571	+0.62%
Source: INSEE

== See also ==
- Communes of the Maine-et-Loire department
