= Lycomorphodes bipartita =

Scientific classification
- Kingdom: Animalia
- Phylum: Arthropoda
- Class: Insecta
- Order: Lepidoptera
- Superfamily: Noctuoidea
- Family: Erebidae
- Subfamily: Arctiinae
- Genus: Lycomorphodes
- Species: L. bipartita

Binomial name
- Lycomorphodes bipartita (Walker, 1866)

Synonyms
- Lycomorpha bipartita Walker, 1866

Species of moth

Lycomorphodes bipartita is a moth of the family Erebidae. It was described by Francis Walker in 1866. It is found in Pará, Brazil.
