= La Meignanne =

- Part of Longuenée-en-Anjou
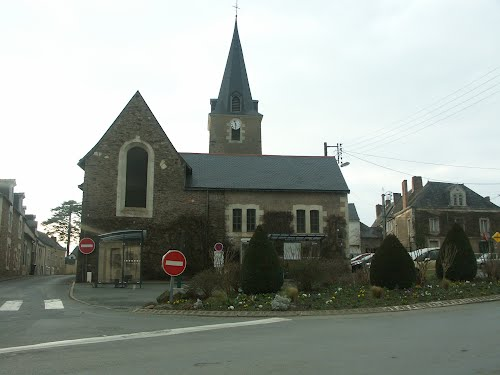
- Location of La Meignanne
- Location within France Location within Pays de la Loire
- Coordinates: 47°31′14″N 0°40′05″W
- Country: France
- Region: Pays de la Loire
- Department: Maine-et-Loire
- Arrondissement: Angers
- Canton: Angers-4
- Commune: Longuenée-en-Anjou
- Area^{1}: 23.39 km^{2} (9.03 sq mi)
- Highest elevation: 99 m (325 ft)
- Lowest elevation: 22 m (72 ft)
- Population (2022): 2,304
  - Density: 98.50/km^{2} (255.1/sq mi)
- Demonym(s): Meignannais, Meignannaise
- Time zone: UTC+01:00 (CET)
  - Summer (DST): UTC+02:00 (CEST)
- Postal code: 49770
- ^{1} French Land Register data, which excludes lakes, ponds, glaciers > 1 km^{2} (0.386 sq mi or 247 acres) and river estuaries.

La Meignanne (French pronunciation: [la mɛɲan]) is a former commune in the Maine-et-Loire department in western France. On 1 January 2016, it was merged into the new commune of Longuenée-en-Anjou.

== See also ==
- Communes of the Maine-et-Loire department
