= Lycomorphodes heringi =

Scientific classification
- Domain: Eukaryota
- Kingdom: Animalia
- Phylum: Arthropoda
- Class: Insecta
- Order: Lepidoptera
- Superfamily: Noctuoidea
- Family: Erebidae
- Subfamily: Arctiinae
- Genus: Lycomorphodes
- Species: L. heringi

Binomial name
- Lycomorphodes heringi Reich, 1933

Species of moth

Lycomorphodes heringi is a moth of the family Erebidae. It was described by Reich in 1933. It is found in Brazil.
