= Nodozana endoxantha =

Scientific classification
- Domain: Eukaryota
- Kingdom: Animalia
- Phylum: Arthropoda
- Class: Insecta
- Order: Lepidoptera
- Superfamily: Noctuoidea
- Family: Erebidae
- Subfamily: Arctiinae
- Genus: Nodozana
- Species: N. endoxantha

Binomial name
- Nodozana endoxantha (E. D. Jones, 1908)

Synonyms
- Odozana endoxantha E. D. Jones, 1908

Species of moth

Nodozana endoxantha is a moth of the subfamily Arctiinae. It was described by E. Dukinfield Jones in 1908. It is found in Paraná, Brazil.
