= Neasura circumducta =

Scientific classification
- Kingdom: Animalia
- Phylum: Arthropoda
- Class: Insecta
- Order: Lepidoptera
- Superfamily: Noctuoidea
- Family: Erebidae
- Subfamily: Arctiinae
- Genus: Neasura
- Species: N. circumducta

Binomial name
- Neasura circumducta (Pagenstecher, 1900)

Synonyms
- Lithosia circumducta Pagenstecher, 1900

Species of moth

Neasura circumducta is a moth of the subfamily Arctiinae. It was described by Pagenstecher in 1900. It is found in New Britain.
