= La Chapelle-Rainsouin =

- Commune
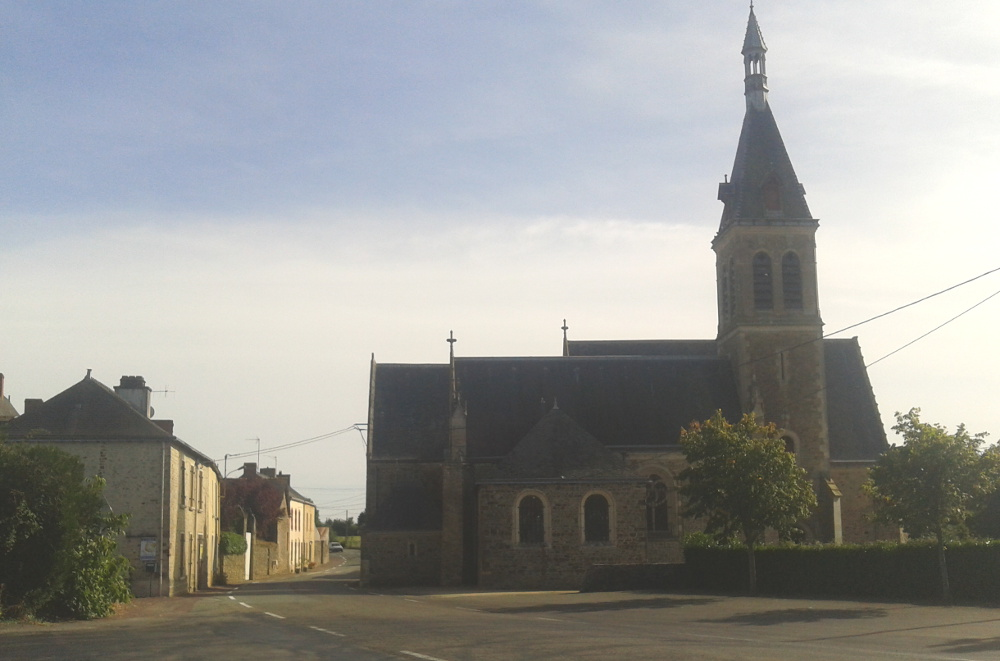
- The church in La Chapelle-Rainsouin
- Location of La Chapelle-Rainsouin
- Location within France Location within Pays de la Loire
- Coordinates: 48°05′58″N 0°31′08″W
- Country: France
- Region: Pays de la Loire
- Department: Mayenne
- Arrondissement: Mayenne
- Canton: Meslay-du-Maine

Government
  - Mayor (2020–2026): Pascal Ribot
- Area^{1}: 18.05 km^{2} (6.97 sq mi)
- Elevation: 112 m (367 ft)
- Highest elevation: 138 m (453 ft)
- Lowest elevation: 73 m (240 ft)
- Population (2023): 412
  - Density: 22.8/km^{2} (59.1/sq mi)
- Time zone: UTC+01:00 (CET)
  - Summer (DST): UTC+02:00 (CEST)
- INSEE/Postal code: 53059 /53150
- ^{1} French Land Register data, which excludes lakes, ponds, glaciers > 1 km^{2} (0.386 sq mi or 247 acres) and river estuaries.

La Chapelle-Rainsouin (French pronunciation: [la ʃapɛl ʁɛ̃swɛ̃]) is a commune in the Mayenne department in north-western France.

== See also ==
- Communes of the Mayenne department
- Ouette
