= Nodozana picturata =

Scientific classification
- Domain: Eukaryota
- Kingdom: Animalia
- Phylum: Arthropoda
- Class: Insecta
- Order: Lepidoptera
- Superfamily: Noctuoidea
- Family: Erebidae
- Subfamily: Arctiinae
- Genus: Nodozana
- Species: N. picturata

Binomial name
- Nodozana picturata Schaus, 1911

Species of moth

Nodozana picturata is a moth of the subfamily Arctiinae. It was described by William Schaus in 1911. It is found in Costa Rica.
