= Lycomorphodes correbioides =

Scientific classification
- Domain: Eukaryota
- Kingdom: Animalia
- Phylum: Arthropoda
- Class: Insecta
- Order: Lepidoptera
- Superfamily: Noctuoidea
- Family: Erebidae
- Subfamily: Arctiinae
- Genus: Lycomorphodes
- Species: L. correbioides

Binomial name
- Lycomorphodes correbioides Schaus, 1911

Species of moth

Lycomorphodes correbioides is a moth of the family Erebidae. It was described by Schaus in 1911. It is found in Costa Rica.
