= Nodozana rhodosticta =

Scientific classification
- Domain: Eukaryota
- Kingdom: Animalia
- Phylum: Arthropoda
- Class: Insecta
- Order: Lepidoptera
- Superfamily: Noctuoidea
- Family: Erebidae
- Subfamily: Arctiinae
- Genus: Nodozana
- Species: N. rhodosticta

Binomial name
- Nodozana rhodosticta (Butler, 1878)

Synonyms
- Cisthene rhodosticta Butler, 1878; Maepha coresa Schaus, 1896; Callisthenia prepielloides Rothschild, 1913

Species of moth

Nodozana rhodosticta is a moth of the subfamily Arctiinae. It was described by Arthur Gardiner Butler in 1878. It is found in the Brazilian states of Amazonas and São Paulo.
