= Nodozana pyrophora =

Scientific classification
- Kingdom: Animalia
- Phylum: Arthropoda
- Class: Insecta
- Order: Lepidoptera
- Superfamily: Noctuoidea
- Family: Erebidae
- Subfamily: Arctiinae
- Genus: Nodozana
- Species: N. pyrophora

Binomial name
- Nodozana pyrophora Hampson, 1911

Species of moth

Nodozana pyrophora is a moth of the subfamily Arctiinae. It was described by George Hampson in 1911. It is found in Bolivia.
