= Lycomorphodes strigosa =

Scientific classification
- Domain: Eukaryota
- Kingdom: Animalia
- Phylum: Arthropoda
- Class: Insecta
- Order: Lepidoptera
- Superfamily: Noctuoidea
- Family: Erebidae
- Subfamily: Arctiinae
- Genus: Lycomorphodes
- Species: L. strigosa

Binomial name
- Lycomorphodes strigosa (Butler, 1877)

Synonyms
- Trichromia strigosa Butler, 1877

Species of moth

Lycomorphodes strigosa is a moth of the family Erebidae. It was described by Arthur Gardiner Butler in 1877. It is found in the Brazilian states of Espírito Santo and São Paulo.
