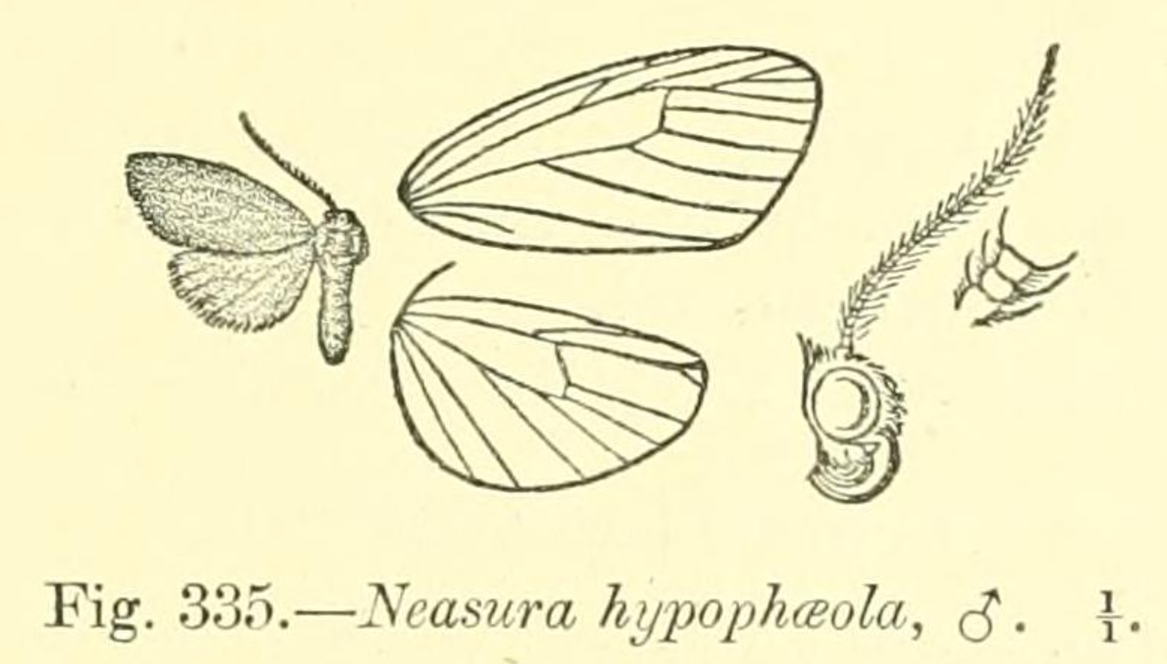

Scientific classification
- Kingdom: Animalia
- Phylum: Arthropoda
- Class: Insecta
- Order: Lepidoptera
- Superfamily: Noctuoidea
- Family: Erebidae
- Subfamily: Arctiinae
- Genus: Neasura
- Species: N. hypophaeola

Binomial name
- Neasura hypophaeola Hampson, 1900

= Neasura hypophaeola =

Species of moth

Neasura hypophaeola is a moth of the subfamily Arctiinae. It was described by George Hampson in 1900. It is found on the Sangihe Islands.
