= Locastra pachylepidalis =

Scientific classification
- Kingdom: Animalia
- Phylum: Arthropoda
- Class: Insecta
- Order: Lepidoptera
- Family: Pyralidae
- Genus: Locastra
- Species: L. pachylepidalis

Binomial name
- Locastra pachylepidalis Hampson, 1896

Species of moth

Locastra pachylepidalis is a species of snout moth in the genus Locastra. It was described by George Hampson in 1896 and is known from Bhutan.
