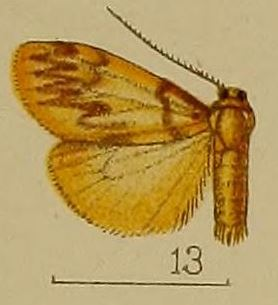
- Neasura taprobana

Scientific classification
- Kingdom: Animalia
- Phylum: Arthropoda
- Class: Insecta
- Order: Lepidoptera
- Superfamily: Noctuoidea
- Family: Erebidae
- Subfamily: Arctiinae
- Tribe: Lithosiini
- Genus: Neasura; Hampson, 1900

Type species
- Neasura hypophaeola Hampson, 1900

= Neasura =

Genus of moths

Neasura is a genus of moths in the subfamily Arctiinae. The genus was first described by George Hampson in 1900.

Some species are:

- Neasura apicalis (Walker, 1854)
- Neasura buruana van Eecke 1929
- Neasura circumducta Pagenstecher 1900
- Neasura gyochiana Matsumura 1927
- Neasura hypophaeola Hampson, 1900
- Neasura nigroanalis Matsumura 1927
- Neasura pellucida de Joannis 1928
- Neasura rufescens Rothschild 1912
- Neasura taprobana Hampson, 1907
