= Chiraps paterata =

Scientific classification
- Domain: Eukaryota
- Kingdom: Animalia
- Phylum: Arthropoda
- Class: Insecta
- Order: Lepidoptera
- Family: Tortricidae
- Genus: Chiraps
- Species: C. paterata

Binomial name
- Chiraps paterata (Meyrick, 1914)

Synonyms
- Cacoecia paterata Meyrick, 1914

Species of moth

Chiraps paterata is a species of moth of the family Tortricidae. It is found in Taiwan.
