= Lycomorphodes coccipyga =

Scientific classification
- Domain: Eukaryota
- Kingdom: Animalia
- Phylum: Arthropoda
- Class: Insecta
- Order: Lepidoptera
- Superfamily: Noctuoidea
- Family: Erebidae
- Subfamily: Arctiinae
- Genus: Lycomorphodes
- Species: L. coccipyga

Binomial name
- Lycomorphodes coccipyga Dognin, 1909

Species of moth

Lycomorphodes coccipyga is a moth of the family Erebidae. It was described by Paul Dognin in 1909. It is found on Curaçao.
