= Neasura rufescens =

Scientific classification
- Kingdom: Animalia
- Phylum: Arthropoda
- Class: Insecta
- Order: Lepidoptera
- Superfamily: Noctuoidea
- Family: Erebidae
- Subfamily: Arctiinae
- Genus: Neasura
- Species: N. rufescens

Binomial name
- Neasura rufescens (Rothschild, 1912)

Synonyms
- Tigrioides rufescens Rothschild, 1912; Neasura rufescens ab. atrisuffusa Strand, 1922

Species of moth

Neasura rufescens is a moth of the subfamily Arctiinae. It was described by Rothschild in 1912. It is found in New Guinea.
