= Nodozana heieroglyphica =

Scientific classification
- Domain: Eukaryota
- Kingdom: Animalia
- Phylum: Arthropoda
- Class: Insecta
- Order: Lepidoptera
- Superfamily: Noctuoidea
- Family: Erebidae
- Subfamily: Arctiinae
- Genus: Nodozana
- Species: N. heieroglyphica

Binomial name
- Nodozana heieroglyphica (Rothschild, 1913)

Synonyms
- Odozana heieroglyphica Rothschild, 1913

Species of moth

Nodozana heieroglyphica is a moth of the subfamily Arctiinae. It is found from Panama to Ecuador.
