= Locastra crassipennis =

Scientific classification
- Kingdom: Animalia
- Phylum: Arthropoda
- Class: Insecta
- Order: Lepidoptera
- Family: Pyralidae
- Genus: Locastra
- Species: L. crassipennis

Binomial name
- Locastra crassipennis (Walker, 1857)

Synonyms
- Eurois crassipennis Walker, 1857; Locastra maimonalis Walker, 1859

Species of moth

Locastra crassipennis is a species of snout moth in the genus Locastra. It was described by Francis Walker in 1857 and is known from Sarawak, Borneo and Silhet, Bangladesh.
