= Avrillé, Maine-et-Loire =

Avrillé
- Commune
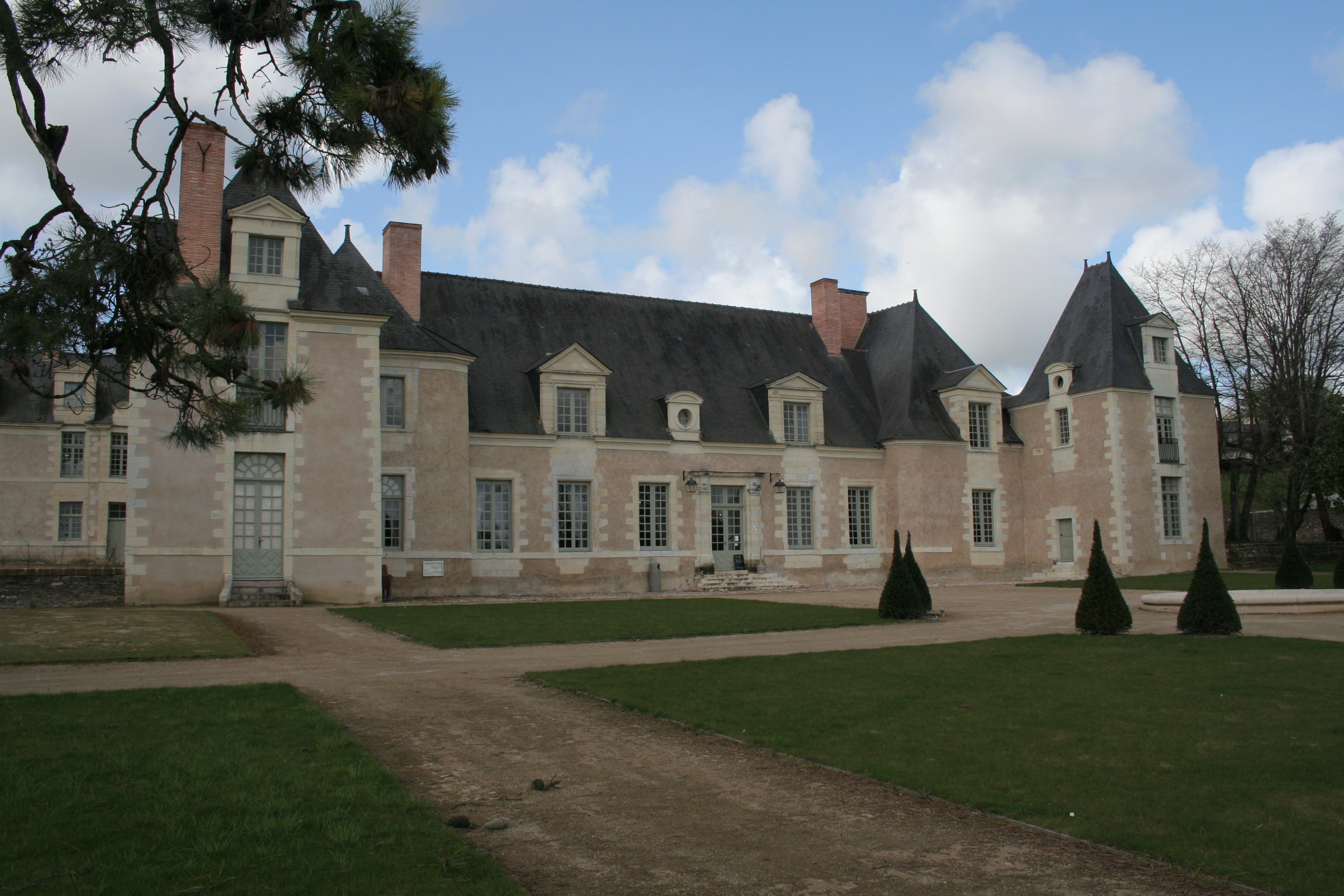
- The Château de la Perrière in Avrillé
- Location of Avrillé
- Location within France Location within Pays de la Loire
- Coordinates: 47°30′28″N 0°35′16″W
- Country: France
- Region: Pays de la Loire
- Department: Maine-et-Loire
- Arrondissement: Angers
- Canton: Angers-4
- Intercommunality: CU Angers Loire Métropole

Government
  - Mayor (2020–2026): Caroline Houssin-Salvetat
- Area^{1}: 15.85 km^{2} (6.12 sq mi)
- Highest elevation: 62 m (203 ft)
- Lowest elevation: 17 m (56 ft)
- Population (2023): 15,251
  - Density: 962.2/km^{2} (2,492/sq mi)
- Time zone: UTC+01:00 (CET)
  - Summer (DST): UTC+02:00 (CEST)
- INSEE/Postal code: 49015 /49240
- ^{1} French Land Register data, which excludes lakes, ponds, glaciers > 1 km^{2} (0.386 sq mi or 247 acres) and river estuaries.

Avrillé (French pronunciation: [avʁije]) is a commune in the Maine-et-Loire department in western France.

== Population ==
Historical population

Year	Pop.	±% p.a.
1800	484	—
1806	591	+3.38%
1821	790	+1.95%
1831	920	+1.54%
1836	1,058	+2.83%
1841	1,273	+3.77%
1846	1,203	−1.12%
1851	1,055	−2.59%
1856	1,064	+0.17%
1861	985	−1.53%
1866	988	+0.06%
1872	959	−0.50%
1876	964	+0.13%
1881	1,003	+0.80%
1886	942	−1.25%
1891	911	−0.67%
1896	1,018	+2.25%
1901	1,163	+2.70%

Year	Pop.	±% p.a.
1906	1,063	−1.78%
1911	1,047	−0.30%
1921	886	−1.66%
1926	1,104	+4.50%
1931	1,422	+5.19%
1936	1,640	+2.89%
1946	1,604	−0.22%
1954	2,218	+4.13%
1962	3,034	+3.99%
1968	4,603	+7.19%
1975	9,386	+10.71%
1982	10,811	+2.04%
1990	12,878	+2.21%
1999	12,991	+0.10%
2007	12,538	−0.44%
2012	12,953	+0.65%
2017	13,692	+1.12%
2023	15,251	+1.81%

Source: EHESS and INSEE (1968-2023)

== See also ==
- Communes of the Maine-et-Loire department
