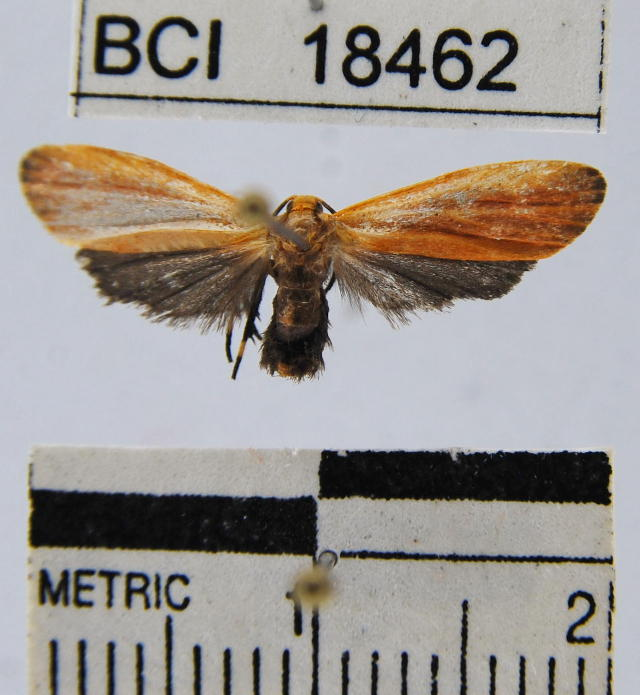
- Lycomorphodes sordida

Scientific classification
- Kingdom: Animalia
- Phylum: Arthropoda
- Class: Insecta
- Order: Lepidoptera
- Superfamily: Noctuoidea
- Family: Erebidae
- Subfamily: Arctiinae
- Subtribe: Cisthenina
- Genus: Lycomorphodes; Hampson, 1900

= Lycomorphodes =

Genus of moths

Lycomorphodes is a genus of moths in the family Erebidae.

== Species ==
- Lycomorphodes angustata Gibeaux, 1983
- Lycomorphodes aracia E. D. Jones, 1914
- Lycomorphodes aurobrunnea Gibeaux, 1983
- Lycomorphodes bicolor Rothschild, 1913
- Lycomorphodes bipartita (Walker, 1866)
- Lycomorphodes calopteridion de Joannis, 1904
- Lycomorphodes circinata Dognin, 1911
- Lycomorphodes coccipyga Dognin, 1909
- Lycomorphodes correbioides Schaus, 1911
- Lycomorphodes dichroa Dognin, 1912
- Lycomorphodes epatra Schaus, 1905
- Lycomorphodes flavipars Hampson, 1909
- Lycomorphodes genificans Dyar, 1914
- Lycomorphodes granvillei Gibeaux, 1983
- Lycomorphodes griseovariegata Gibeaux, 1983
- Lycomorphodes hemicrocea Dognin, 1909
- Lycomorphodes heringi Reich, 1933
- Lycomorphodes sordida (Butler, 1877)
- Lycomorphodes splendida Draudt, 1918
- Lycomorphodes strigosa (Butler, 1877)
- Lycomorphodes suspecta (Felder, 1875)
- Lycomorphodes tortricina Rothschild, 1913
