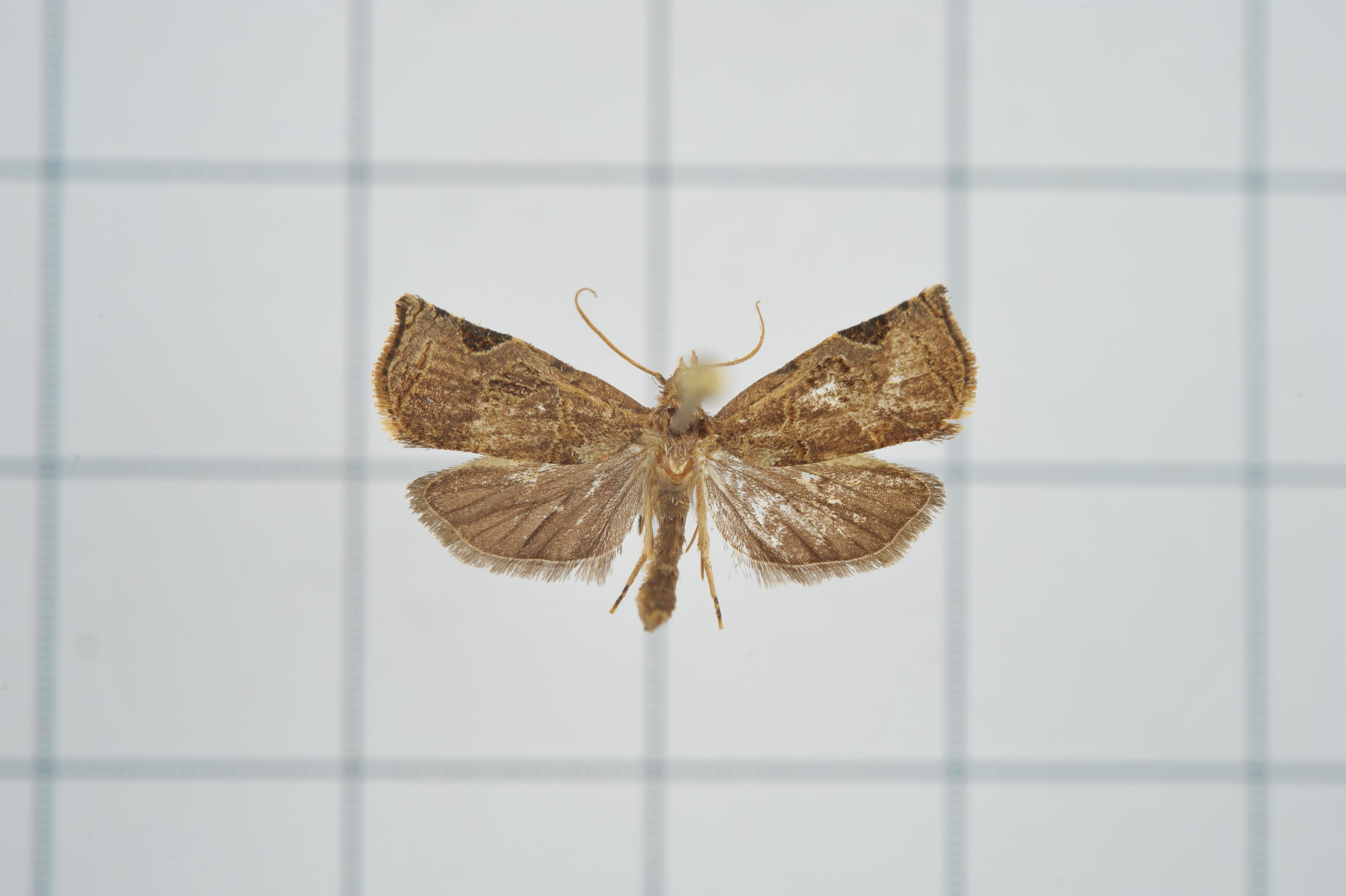

Scientific classification
- Domain: Eukaryota
- Kingdom: Animalia
- Phylum: Arthropoda
- Class: Insecta
- Order: Lepidoptera
- Family: Tortricidae
- Genus: Chiraps
- Species: C. alloica

Binomial name
- Chiraps alloica (Diakonoff, 1948)

Synonyms
- Cacoecia alloica Diakonoff, 1948

= Chiraps alloica =

Species of moth

Chiraps alloica is a moth of the family Tortricidae. It is widely distributed in the Oriental region, from the Himalayas to Indonesia, including Bhutan, Thailand, western Malaysia, Vietnam and Taiwan.
