= Lycomorphodes hemicrocea =

Scientific classification
- Domain: Eukaryota
- Kingdom: Animalia
- Phylum: Arthropoda
- Class: Insecta
- Order: Lepidoptera
- Superfamily: Noctuoidea
- Family: Erebidae
- Subfamily: Arctiinae
- Genus: Lycomorphodes
- Species: L. hemicrocea

Binomial name
- Lycomorphodes hemicrocea Dognin, 1909

Species of moth

Lycomorphodes hemicrocea is a moth of the family Erebidae. It was described by Paul Dognin in 1909. It is found in Colombia.
