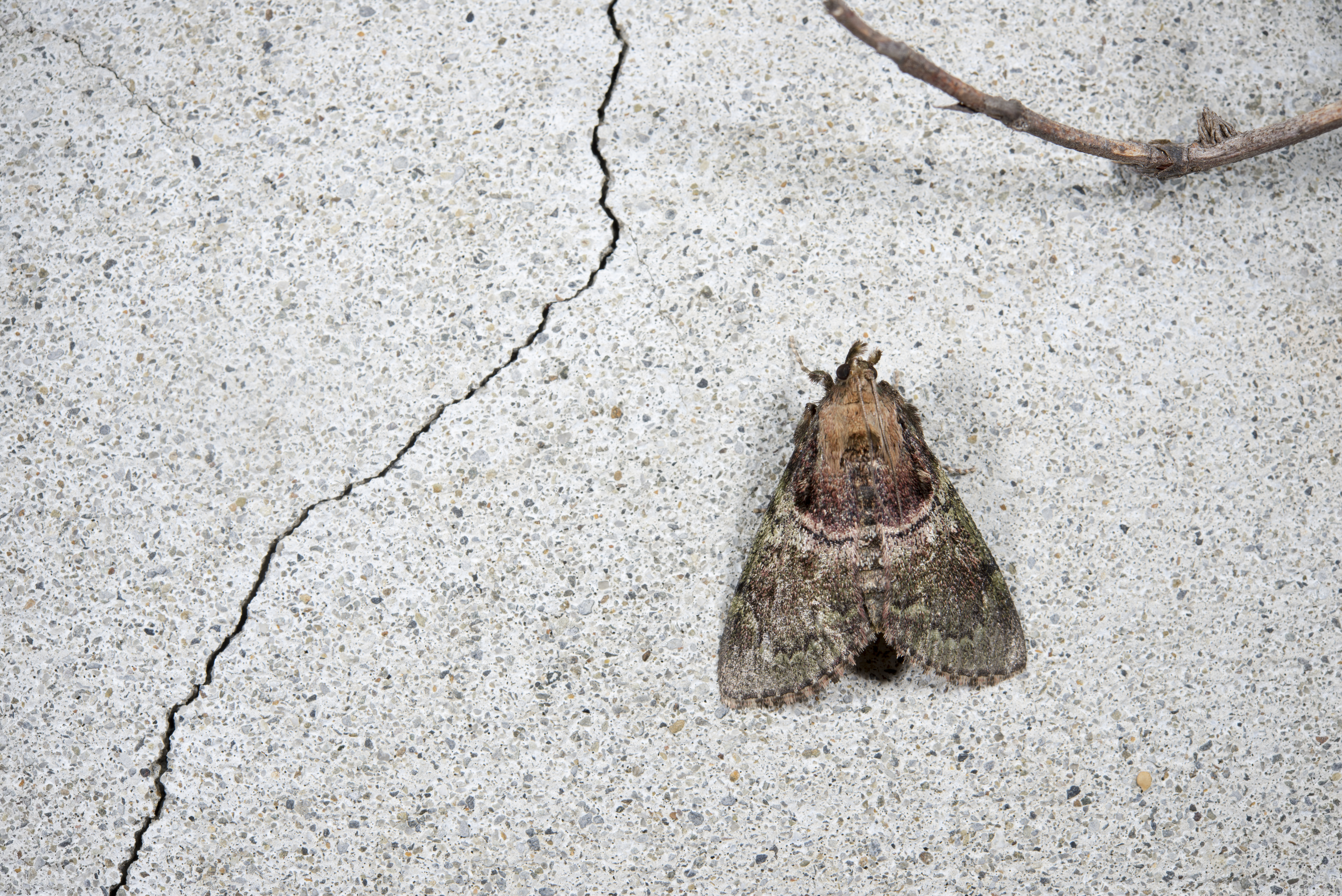

Scientific classification
- Kingdom: Animalia
- Phylum: Arthropoda
- Class: Insecta
- Order: Lepidoptera
- Family: Pyralidae
- Genus: Locastra
- Species: L. muscosalis

Binomial name
- Locastra muscosalis (Walker, [1866])

Synonyms
- Taurica muscosalis Walker, [1866]; Locastra cristalis Hampson; Taurica sikkima Moore, 1888

= Locastra muscosalis =

Species of moth

Locastra muscosalis is a species of snout moth in the genus Locastra. It was described by Francis Walker in 1866 and is known from India (including Darjiling) and Sri Lanka.
