= Nodozana thricophora =

Scientific classification
- Kingdom: Animalia
- Phylum: Arthropoda
- Class: Insecta
- Order: Lepidoptera
- Superfamily: Noctuoidea
- Family: Erebidae
- Subfamily: Arctiinae
- Genus: Nodozana
- Species: N. thricophora

Binomial name
- Nodozana thricophora Hampson, 1900

Species of moth

Nodozana thricophora is a moth of the subfamily Arctiinae. It was described by George Hampson in 1900. It is found in Panama.
