= Nodozana subandroconiata =

Scientific classification
- Domain: Eukaryota
- Kingdom: Animalia
- Phylum: Arthropoda
- Class: Insecta
- Order: Lepidoptera
- Superfamily: Noctuoidea
- Family: Erebidae
- Subfamily: Arctiinae
- Genus: Nodozana
- Species: N. subandroconiata

Binomial name
- Nodozana subandroconiata Rothschild, 1916

Species of moth

Nodozana subandroconiata is a moth of the subfamily Arctiinae. It is found in Colombia.
