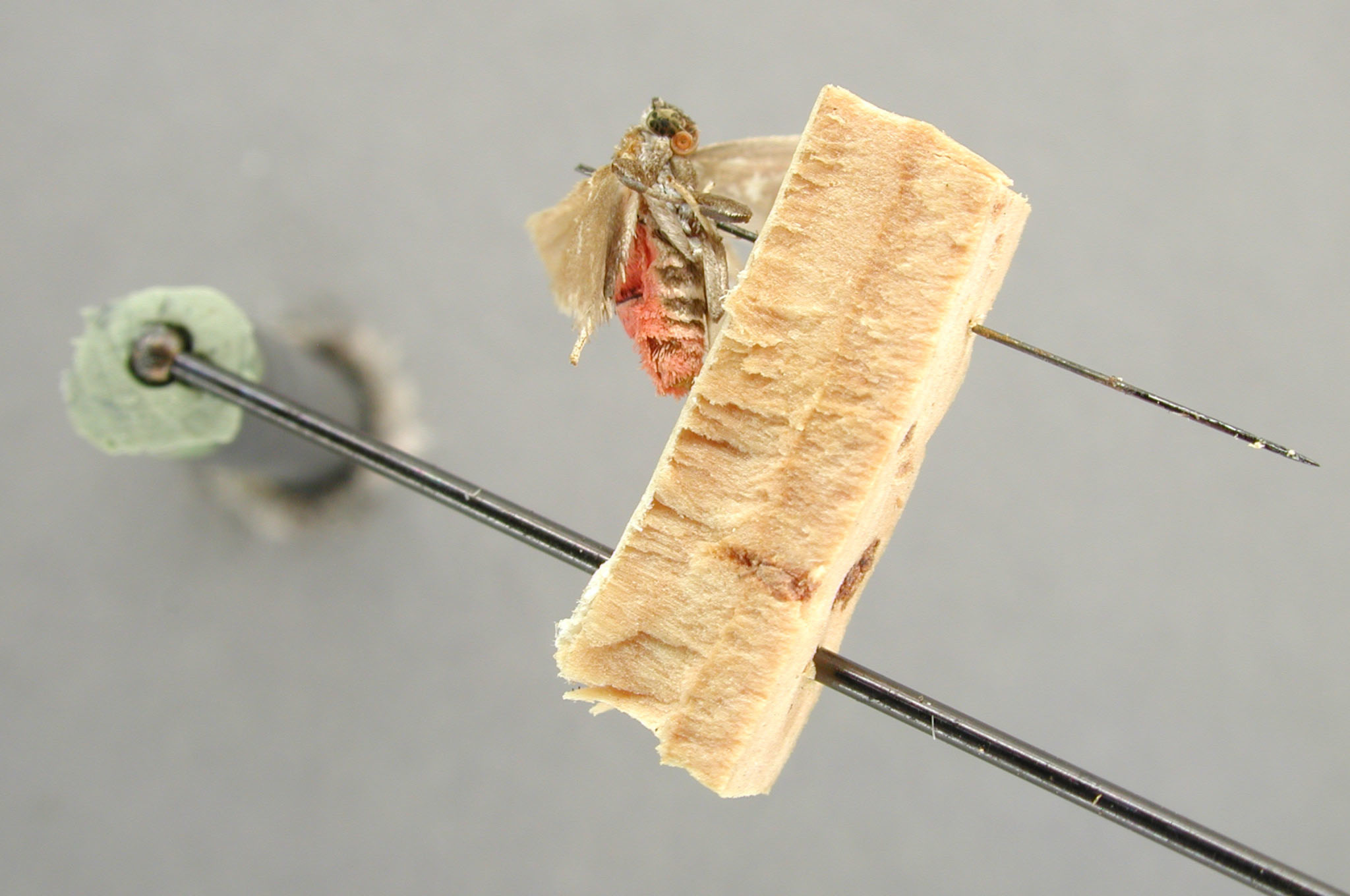

Scientific classification
- Kingdom: Animalia
- Phylum: Arthropoda
- Class: Insecta
- Order: Lepidoptera
- Superfamily: Noctuoidea
- Family: Erebidae
- Subfamily: Arctiinae
- Genus: Lycomorphodes
- Species: L. genificans

Binomial name
- Lycomorphodes genificans Dyar, 1914

= Lycomorphodes genificans =

Species of moth

Lycomorphodes genificans is a moth of the family Erebidae. It was described by Harrison Gray Dyar Jr. in 1914. It is found in Panama.
