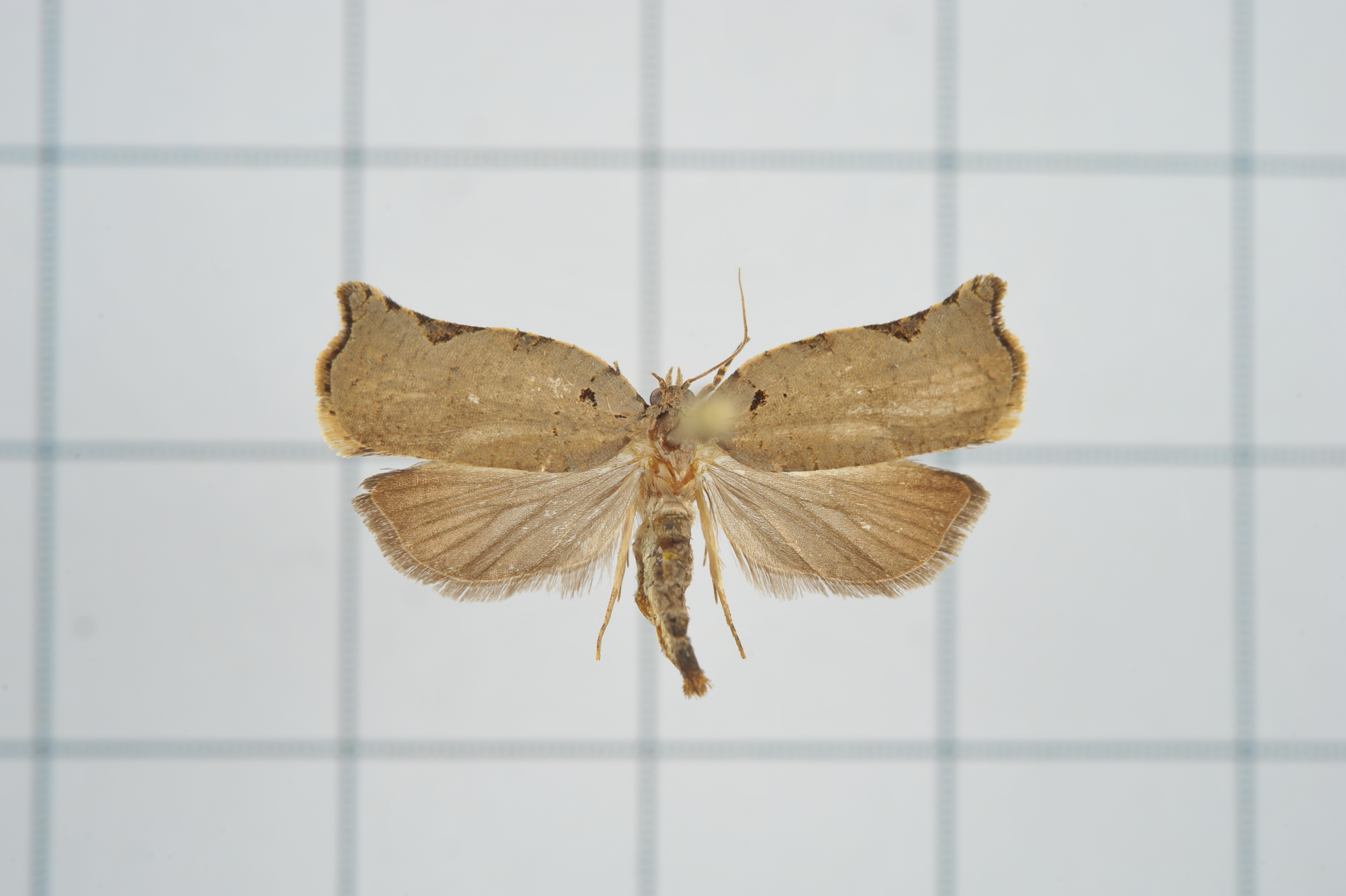
- Chiraps alloica

Scientific classification
- Domain: Eukaryota
- Kingdom: Animalia
- Phylum: Arthropoda
- Class: Insecta
- Order: Lepidoptera
- Family: Tortricidae
- Tribe: Archipini
- Genus: Chiraps; Diakonoff & Razowski, 1971

= Chiraps =

Genus of tortrix moths

Chiraps is a genus of moths belonging to the subfamily Tortricinae of the family Tortricidae.

== Species ==
- Chiraps alloica (Diakonoff, 1948)
- Chiraps excurvata (Meyrick, in de Joannis, 1930)
- Chiraps paterata (Meyrick, 1914)
- Chiraps phaedra (Diakonoff, 1983)

== See also ==
- List of Tortricidae genera
