= Lycomorphodes bicolor =

Scientific classification
- Domain: Eukaryota
- Kingdom: Animalia
- Phylum: Arthropoda
- Class: Insecta
- Order: Lepidoptera
- Superfamily: Noctuoidea
- Family: Erebidae
- Subfamily: Arctiinae
- Genus: Lycomorphodes
- Species: L. bicolor

Binomial name
- Lycomorphodes bicolor Rothschild, 1913

Species of moth

Lycomorphodes bicolor is a moth of the family Erebidae. It was described by Rothschild in 1913. It is found in Colombia.
