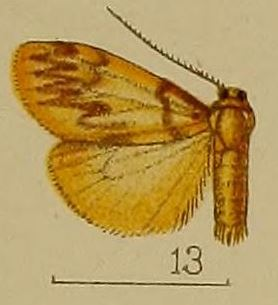

Scientific classification
- Kingdom: Animalia
- Phylum: Arthropoda
- Class: Insecta
- Order: Lepidoptera
- Superfamily: Noctuoidea
- Family: Erebidae
- Subfamily: Arctiinae
- Genus: Neasura
- Species: N. taprobana

Binomial name
- Neasura taprobana Hampson, 1907

= Neasura taprobana =

Species of moth

Neasura taprobana is a moth of the subfamily Arctiinae first described by George Hampson in 1907. It is found in Sri Lanka.
