= Locastra =

Scientific classification
- Kingdom: Animalia
- Phylum: Arthropoda
- Class: Insecta
- Order: Lepidoptera
- Family: Pyralidae
- Subfamily: Epipaschiinae
- Genus: Locastra; Walker, 1859

Synonyms
- Taurica Walker, 1866

Genus of moths

Locastra is a genus of snout moths. It was described by Francis Walker in 1859.

== Species ==
- Locastra ardua Swinhoe, 1902
- Locastra bryalis
- Locastra crassipennis
- Locastra muscosalis (Walker, [1866]
- Locastra pachylepidalis
