= Nodozana toulgoeti =

Scientific classification
- Kingdom: Animalia
- Phylum: Arthropoda
- Clade: Pancrustacea
- Class: Insecta
- Order: Lepidoptera
- Superfamily: Noctuoidea
- Family: Erebidae
- Subfamily: Arctiinae
- Genus: Nodozana
- Species: N. toulgoeti

Binomial name
- Nodozana toulgoeti Gibeaux, 1983

Species of moth

Nodozana toulgoeti is a moth of the subfamily Arctiinae. It was described by Christian Gibeaux in 1983. It is found in French Guiana.
