= Neasura gyochiana =

Scientific classification
- Kingdom: Animalia
- Phylum: Arthropoda
- Clade: Pancrustacea
- Class: Insecta
- Order: Lepidoptera
- Superfamily: Noctuoidea
- Family: Erebidae
- Subfamily: Arctiinae
- Genus: Neasura
- Species: N. gyochiana

Binomial name
- Neasura gyochiana Matsumura, 1927

Species of moth

Neasura gyochiana is a moth of the subfamily Arctiinae. It was described by Shōnen Matsumura in 1927. It is found in Taiwan.
