= Neasura buruana =

Scientific classification
- Kingdom: Animalia
- Phylum: Arthropoda
- Class: Insecta
- Order: Lepidoptera
- Superfamily: Noctuoidea
- Family: Erebidae
- Subfamily: Arctiinae
- Genus: Neasura
- Species: N. buruana

Binomial name
- Neasura buruana van Eecke, 1929

Species of moth

Neasura buruana is a moth of the subfamily Arctiinae. It was described by van Eecke in 1929. It is found on Buru.
