= Lycomorphodes dichroa =

Scientific classification
- Domain: Eukaryota
- Kingdom: Animalia
- Phylum: Arthropoda
- Class: Insecta
- Order: Lepidoptera
- Superfamily: Noctuoidea
- Family: Erebidae
- Subfamily: Arctiinae
- Genus: Lycomorphodes
- Species: L. dichroa

Binomial name
- Lycomorphodes dichroa Dognin, 1912

Species of moth

Lycomorphodes dichroa is a moth of the family Erebidae. It was discovered by Paul Dognin in 1912. It is found in Colombia.
