= Lycomorphodes angustata =

Scientific classification
- Kingdom: Animalia
- Phylum: Arthropoda
- Clade: Pancrustacea
- Class: Insecta
- Order: Lepidoptera
- Superfamily: Noctuoidea
- Family: Erebidae
- Subfamily: Arctiinae
- Genus: Lycomorphodes
- Species: L. angustata

Binomial name
- Lycomorphodes angustata (Gibeaux, 1983)

Synonyms
- Nodozana angustata Gibeaux, 1983

Species of moth

Lycomorphodes angustata is a moth of the family Erebidae. It was described by Christian Gibeaux in 1983. It is found in French Guiana.
