= Pruillé =

- Part of Longuenée-en-Anjou
- Location of Pruillé
- Location within France Location within Pays de la Loire
- Coordinates: 47°34′42″N 0°39′40″W
- Country: France
- Region: Pays de la Loire
- Department: Maine-et-Loire
- Arrondissement: Angers
- Canton: Tiercé
- Commune: Longuenée-en-Anjou
- Area^{1}: 12.68 km^{2} (4.90 sq mi)
- Elevation: 60 m (200 ft)
- Highest elevation: 83 m (272 ft)
- Lowest elevation: 12 m (39 ft)
- Population (2022): 744
  - Density: 58.7/km^{2} (152/sq mi)
- Demonym(s): Pruilléen, Pruilléenne
- Time zone: UTC+01:00 (CET)
  - Summer (DST): UTC+02:00 (CEST)
- Postal code: 49220
- ^{1} French Land Register data, which excludes lakes, ponds, glaciers > 1 km^{2} (0.386 sq mi or 247 acres) and river estuaries.

Pruillé (French pronunciation: [pʁɥije]) is a former commune in the Maine-et-Loire department in western France. On 1 January 2016, it was merged into the new commune of Longuenée-en-Anjou.

== See also ==
- Communes of the Maine-et-Loire department
