= Montreuil-Juigné =

- Commune
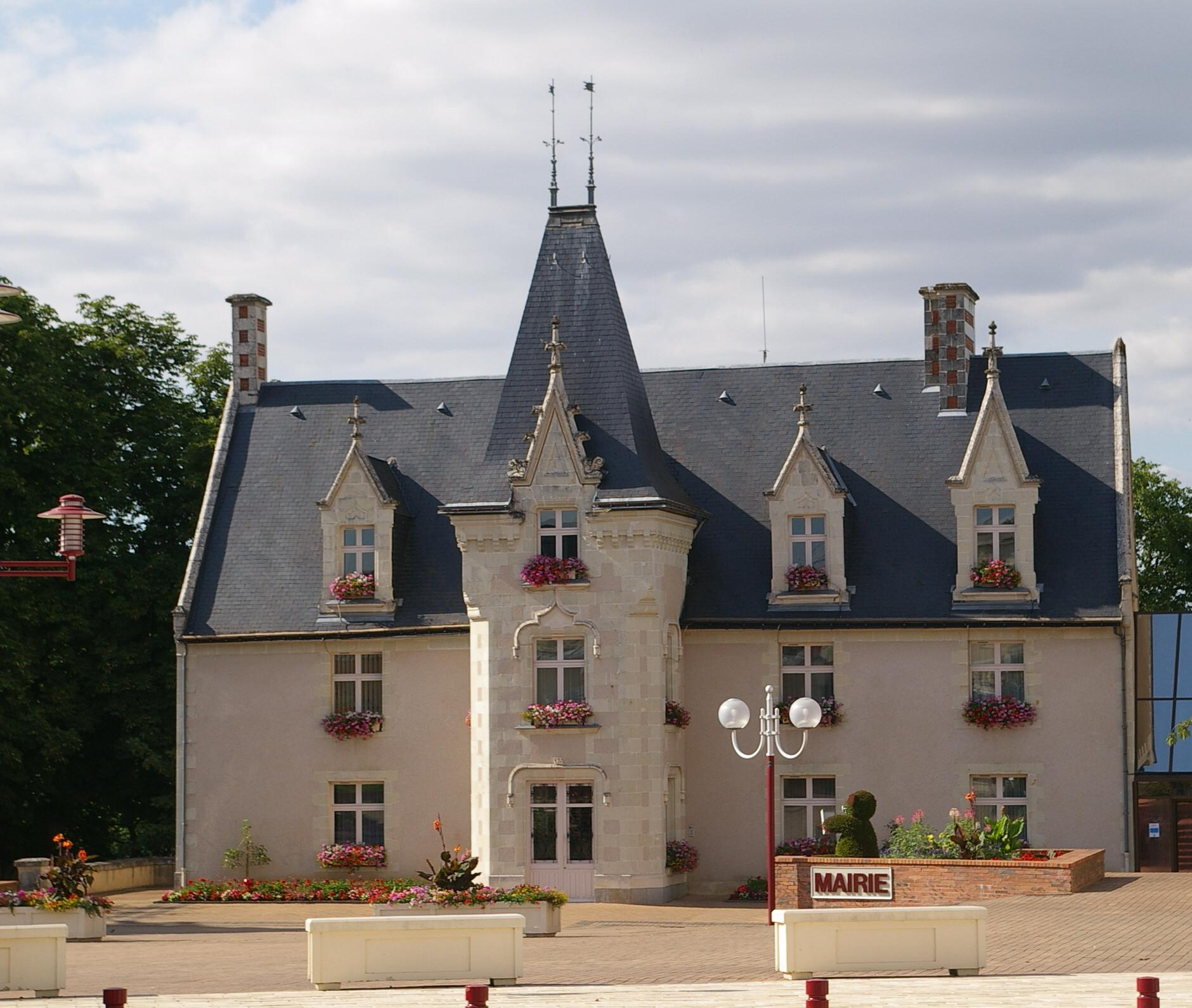
- The town hall of Montreuil-Juigné
- Location of Montreuil-Juigné
- Location within France Location within Pays de la Loire
- Coordinates: 47°31′45″N 0°36′39″W
- Country: France
- Region: Pays de la Loire
- Department: Maine-et-Loire
- Arrondissement: Angers
- Canton: Angers-4
- Intercommunality: CU Angers Loire Métropole

Government
  - Mayor (2020–2026): Benoît Cochet
- Area^{1}: 13.81 km^{2} (5.33 sq mi)
- Elevation: 50 m (160 ft)
- Highest elevation: 72 m (236 ft)
- Lowest elevation: 12 m (39 ft)
- Population (2023): 7,808
  - Density: 565.4/km^{2} (1,464/sq mi)
- Time zone: UTC+01:00 (CET)
  - Summer (DST): UTC+02:00 (CEST)
- INSEE/Postal code: 49214 /49460
- ^{1} French Land Register data, which excludes lakes, ponds, glaciers > 1 km^{2} (0.386 sq mi or 247 acres) and river estuaries.

Montreuil-Juigné (French pronunciation: [mɔ̃tʁœj ʒɥiɲe]) is a commune in the Maine-et-Loire department in western France. It is around 10 km (6.2 mi) north-west of Angers.

== Population ==
Historical population
Year	Pop.	±% p.a.
1968	2,854	—
1975	3,832	+4.30%
1982	5,623	+5.63%
1990	6,451	+1.73%
1999	6,666	+0.36%
2007	6,797	+0.24%
2012	7,174	+1.09%
2017	7,517	+0.94%
2023	7,808	+0.64%
Source: INSEE

== See also ==
- Communes of the Maine-et-Loire department
