= Maine (river) =

River in France

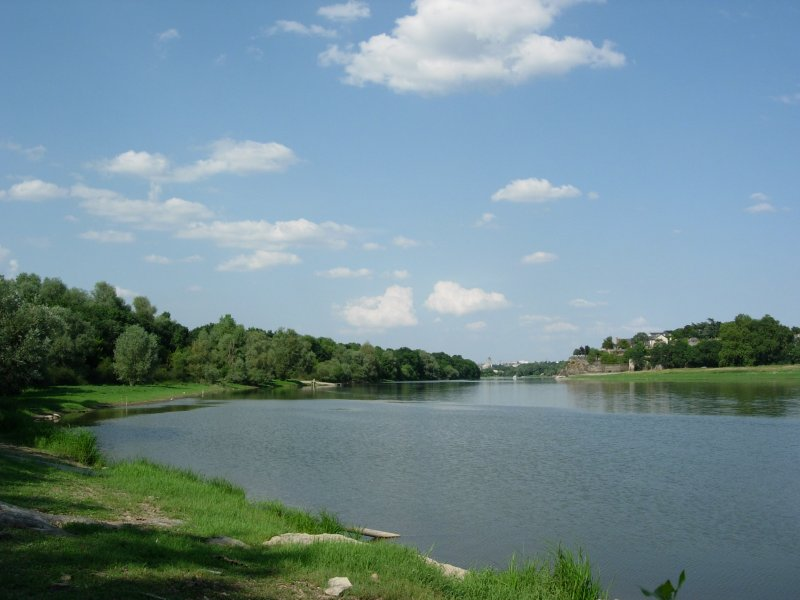
- The Maine near Angers

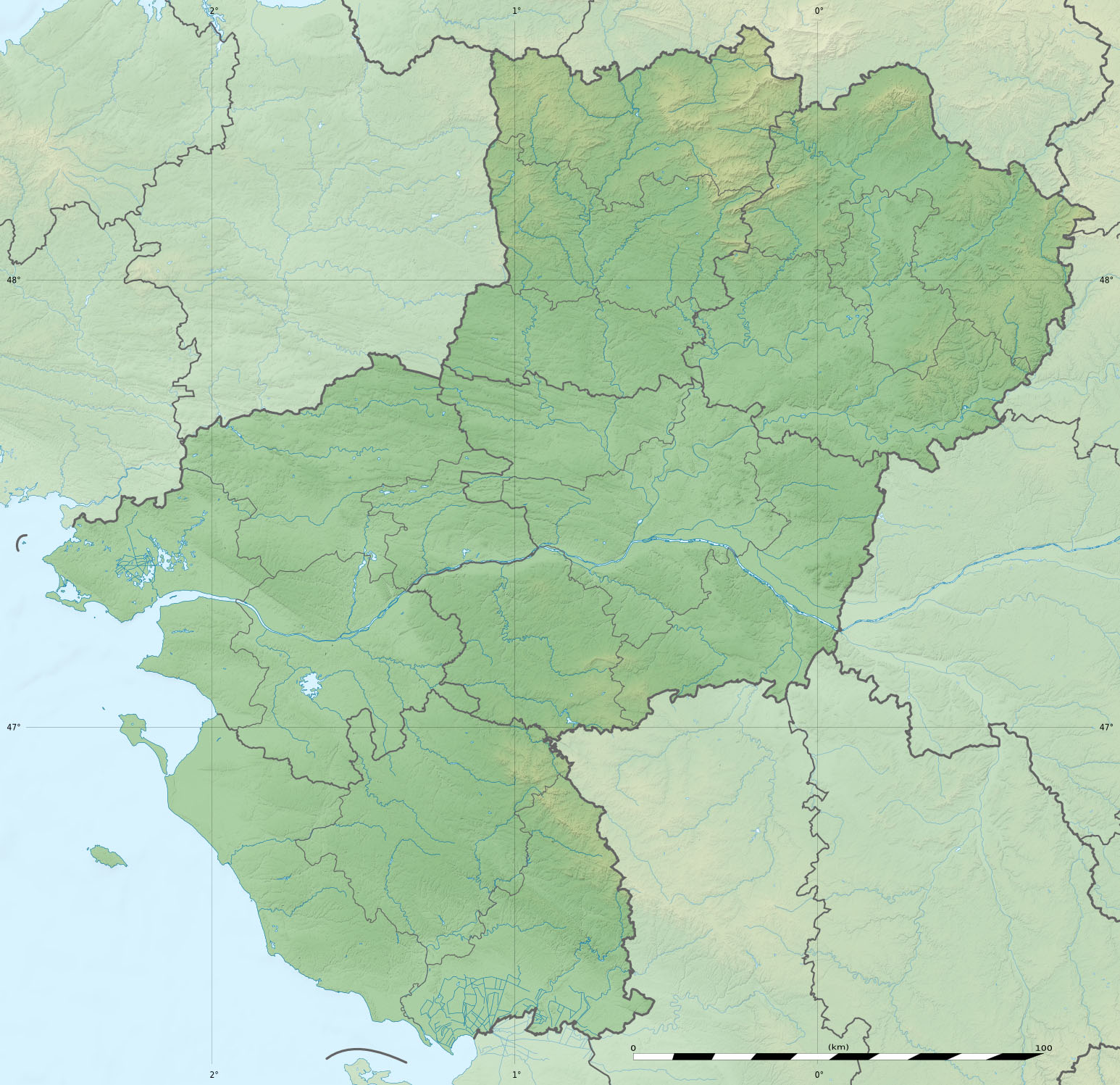
- Location within France Location within Pays de la Loire
- Native name: La Maine (French)

Location
- Country: France

Physical characteristics
- Source
  - location: Sarthe and Mayenne
  - elevation: ±25 m (82 ft)
- Mouth
  - location: Loire
  - coordinates: 47°24′39″N 0°36′53″W
- Length: 11.5 km (7.1 mi)
- Basin size: 22,194 km^{2} (8,569 sq mi)
- Discharge
  - average: 128 m^{3}/s (4,500 cu ft/s)

Basin features
- Progression: Loire→ Atlantic Ocean

The Maine (French pronunciation: [mɛːn]) is a river, a tributary of the Loire, 11.5 km (7.1 mi) long, in the Maine-et-Loire département in France.

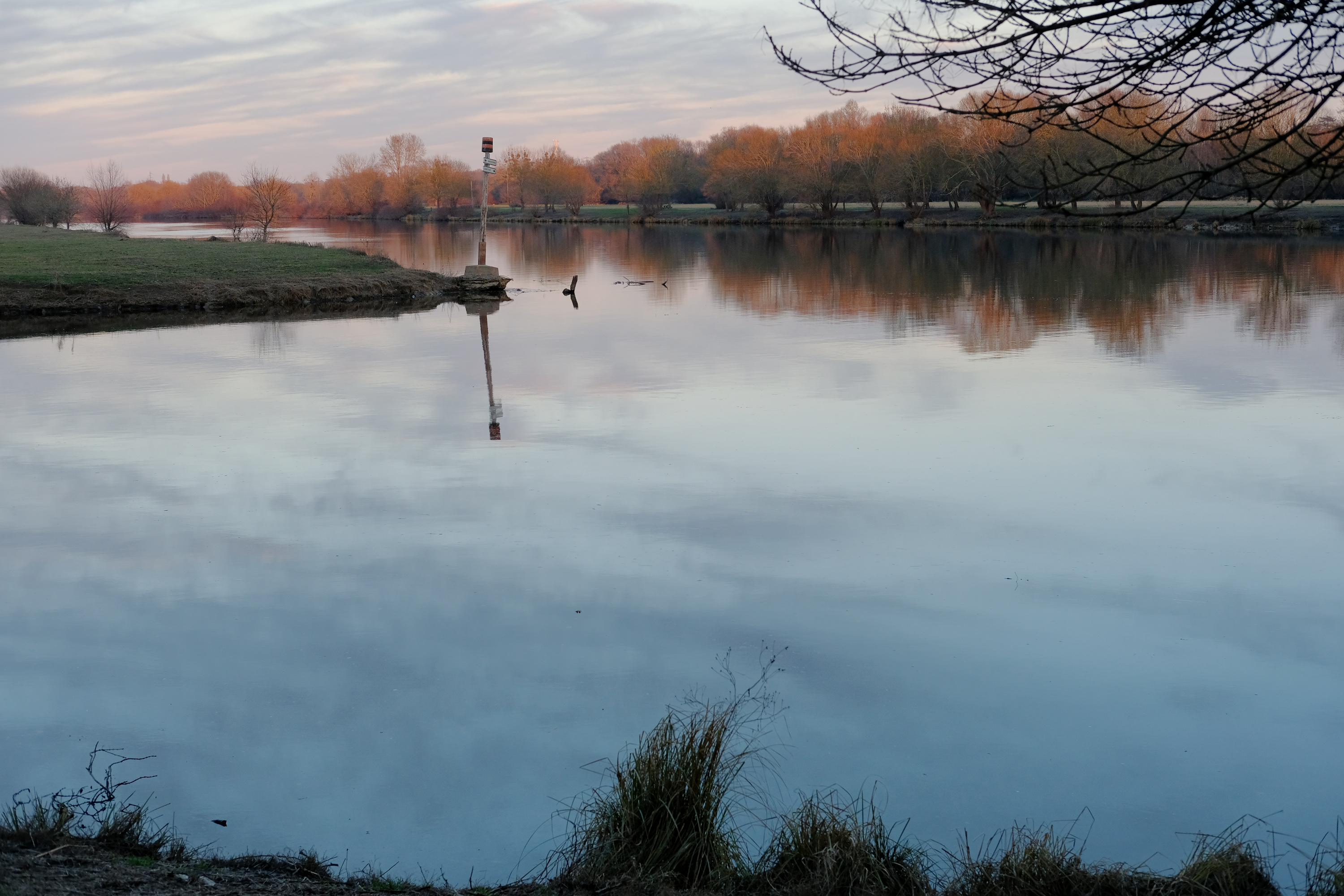
The confluence of the Mayenne (left, bottom) and Sarthe (left, top) rivers north of Angers. The Maine is on the right.

It is formed by the confluence of the Mayenne and Sarthe rivers north of Angers. It flows through this city and joins the Loire southwest of Angers.

The river's name is derived from the ancient Meodena, as is Mayenne, and is unrelated to Maine, the province.
