= Joseph de Joannis =

French clergyman and lepidopterist

President of the Société entomologique de France
- In office 1908–1916

Personal details
- Born: 6 June 1864 La Meignanne, French Empire
- Died: 27 October 1932 (aged 68) Paris, France
- Parent: Léon-Daniel de Joannis (father)
- Occupation: Clergyman, Lepidopterist, President of the Société entomologique de France
- Known for: Discovering Glyphodes mascarenalis

Joseph de Joannis (6 June 1864 La Meignanne, Maine-et-Loire, Pays de la Loire – 27 October 1932 Paris) was a French clergyman and lepidopterist. De Joannis was the president of the Société entomologique de France from 1908 to 1916. His father Léon-Daniel de Joannis (1803–1868) was an entomologist and an ichthyologist.

He was most notable for his discovery of Glyphodes mascarenalis and his two books on entomology: Descriptions de Lépidoptères nouveaux de l'ile Maurice in 1906 and Lépidoptères Hétérocères des Mascareigns et des Seychelles in 1915.
